= Admiral Holmes =

Admiral Holmes may refer to:

- Charles Holmes (Royal Navy officer) (1711–1761), British Royal Navy rear admiral
- Ephraim P. Holmes (1908–1997), U.S. Navy admiral
- John Holmes (Royal Navy officer) (c. 1640–1683), English admiral
- Robert Holmes (Royal Navy officer) (c. 1622–1692), English admiral

== See also ==
- Herbert Edward Holmes à Court (1869–1934), British Royal Navy vice admiral
