= Baron Holmes =

- Creation date: 1760 (first creation); 1797 (second creation)
- Created by: George II (first creation); George III (second creation)
- Peerage: Peerage of Great Britain (first and second creations)
- Remainder to: Heirs male of the body lawfully begotten
- Extinction date: 1764 (first creation); 1804 (second creation)

Baron Holmes was a title that was created twice in the Peerage of Ireland. The first creation came on 11 September 1760 when the politician Thomas Holmes was made Baron Holmes, of Kilmallock in the County of Limerick. The title became extinct on his death on 21 July 1764. The second creation came on 6 November 1797 when Leonard Holmes was made Baron Holmes, of Kilmallock in the County of Limerick. He was the nephew of the first Baron of the 1760 creation. The title became extinct on his death on 18 January 1804.

== Barons Holmes, first creation (1760) ==
- Thomas Holmes, 1st Baron Holmes (1699–1764)

== Barons Holmes, second creation (1797) ==
- Leonard Holmes, 1st Baron Holmes (c. 1732 – 18 January 1804).

Born Leonard Troughear, he was the son of Thomas Troughear and Elizabeth Holmes, daughter of Henry Holmes and sister of Thomas Holmes, 1st Baron Holmes. He was a clergyman. On succeeding to his uncle Lord Holmes's estates he assumed the surname of Holmes in lieu of his patronymic.

In 1797, the barony held by his uncle was also revived when Holmes was raised to the Peerage of Ireland as Baron Holmes, of Kilmallock in the County of Limerick. Lord Holmes married Elizabeth Tyrrell. They had one daughter, The Honourable Catherine Holmes, who married Edward Rushworth and had several children by him. Lord Holmes died in January 1804. As he had no sons the barony died with him. Lady Holmes died in 1810.

== Genealogy ==
- Henry Holmes of Mallow, County Cork, Ireland
  - Colonel Thomas Holmes of Kilmallock, County Limerick, Ireland
    - Henry Holmes (c. 1660–1738) m. Mary Holmes (daughter of Admiral Sir Robert Holmes)
      - Thomas Holmes, 1st Baron Holmes (1699–1764)
      - Lieutenant General Henry Holmes (1703–62)
      - Rear Admiral Charles Holmes (1711–1761)
      - Elizabeth Holmes m. Thomas Troughear
        - Leonard (Troughear) Holmes, 1st Baron Holmes (c. 1732–1804) m. Elizabeth Tyrrell (d.1810)
          - The Hon. Catherine Holmes m. Edward Rushworth
            - Descendants
  - Admiral Sir Robert Holmes (c. 1622–1692), English Admiral
    - Mary Holmes (wife of Henry Holmes)
  - Admiral Sir John Holmes (1640?–1683), English Admiral leader

== See also ==
- Holmes's Bonfire, Raid by the English Fleet on the Vlie estuary, Netherlands, during the Second Anglo-Dutch War in 1666
- Worsley (later Worsley-Holmes) baronets, baronetcy created in the Baronetage of England
- Baron Heytesbury (à Court (later Holmes-à Court) family), peerage created in the Peerage of the United Kingdom
