= Baron Holmes (disambiguation) =

Baron Holmes was a hereditary title in the Peerage of Ireland.

- Thomas Holmes, 1st Baron Holmes (1699–1764), British Tory politician

Baron Holmes may also refer to:

- Chris Holmes, Baron Holmes of Richmond (born 1971), British swimmer and Conservative life peer

== See also ==
- Richard Holme, Baron Holme of Cheltenham (1936–2008), British Liberal Democrat politician
