= John Howe (MP for Yarmouth) =

John Howe (1556–1591), of South Ockenden, Essex, was an English Member of Parliament (MP).

He was a Member of the Parliament of England for Yarmouth (Isle of Wight) in 1589, in the 7th Parliament of Queen Elizabeth I.

Parliament of England
Preceded by Thomas West; John Duncombe	Member of Parliament for Yarmouth (Isle of Wight); 1589; With: Daniel Hills	Succeeded by Robert Dillington; Robert Crosse
