= Robert Holmes (Royal Navy officer) =

English Royal Navy officer (1622–1692)

Admiral Sir Robert Holmes
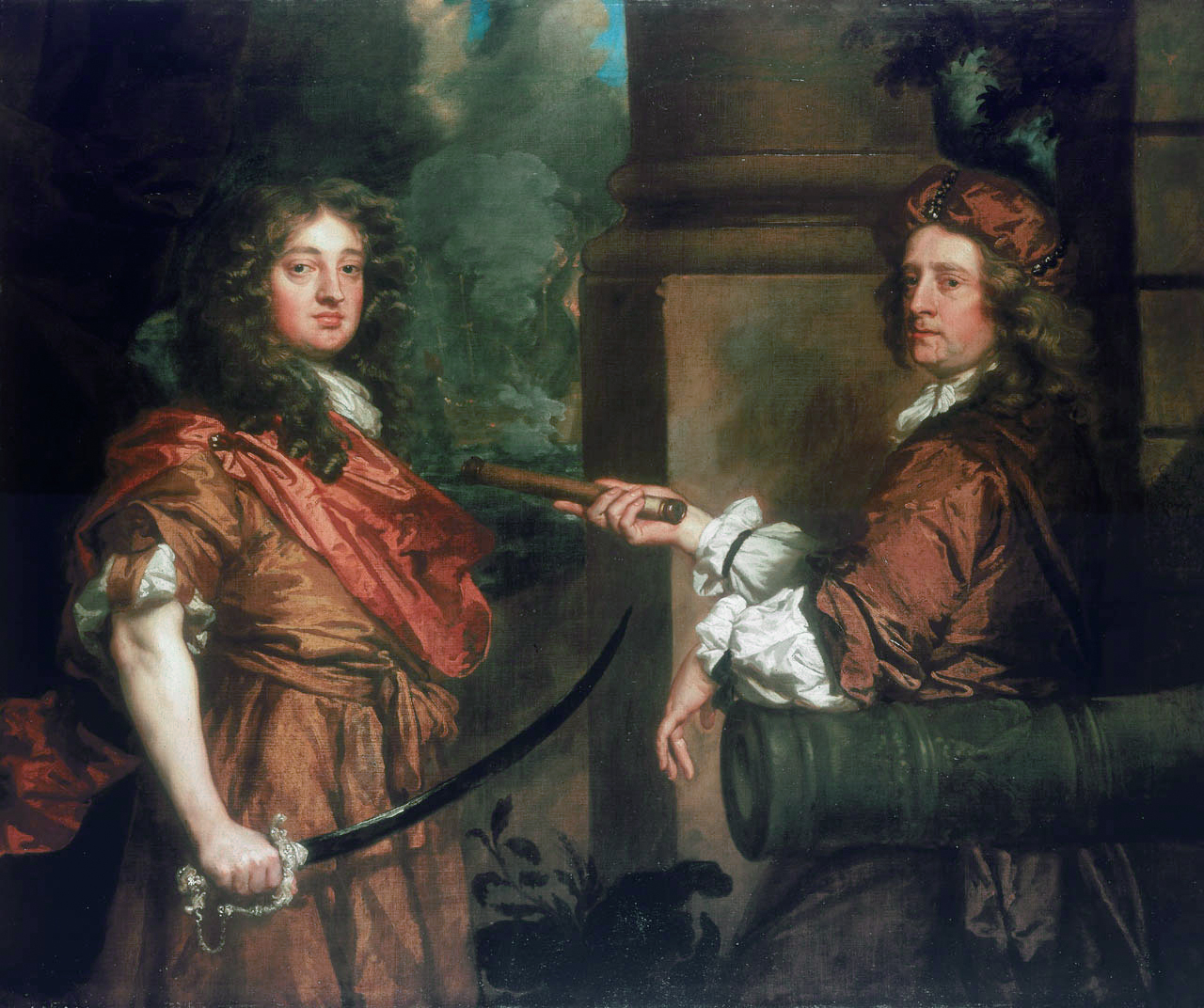
- Sir Frescheville Holles (on left) and Sir Robert Holmes (on right), painted by Peter Lely

Governor of the Isle of Wight
- In office 1668–1692
- Monarchs: Charles II; James II & VII; William III & II and Mary II
- Preceded by: The Lord Colepeper
- Succeeded by: Hon. Thomas Tollemache

Vice-Admiral of Hampshire
- In office 1669–1692
- Preceded by: The Lord Colepeper
- Succeeded by: Marquess of Winchester

Member of Parliament for Yarmouth
- In office 1689–1690 Serving with Hon. Fitton Gerard
- Monarch: Charles II
- Preceded by: Thomas Wyndham; William Hewer
- Succeeded by: Sir John Trevor; Charles Duncombe

Personal details
- Born: 1622
- Died: 18 November 1692 (aged 69–70)
- Children: Mary Holmes
- Parent: Henry Holmes
- Relatives: Sir John Holmes (brother); Henry Holmes (nephew); Thomas Holmes (grandson); Henry Holmes (grandson); Charles Holmes (grandson)
- Military career
- Allegiance: (Kingdom of England) England
- Branch: English Army; Royal Navy
- Service years: 1643–1687
- Rank: Captain (Army); Admiral (Navy)
- Commands: HMS Royal Charles; HMS Reserve; HMS Revenge

Admiral Sir Robert Holmes (c. 1622 – 18 November 1692) was an English Royal Navy officer. He participated in the second and third Anglo-Dutch Wars, both of which he is, by some, credited with having started. He was made Governor of the Isle of Wight, where he is buried in Yarmouth Parish Church.

Holmes is chiefly remembered for his exploits on the cruise to Guinea in 1664 on the behalf of the Royal African Company, and carrying out Holmes's Bonfire of 1666. He is regarded as an archetypal figure both of the quarrelsome restoration officer and of the coming into being of the British professional naval officer.

== The Interregnum ==
=== Military beginnings ===
Born in or about 1622 the son of Henry Holmes, Esq. of Mallow, County Cork, Ireland, nothing is known of Holmes' early life, although his flawless command of written language and his elegant handwriting suggest a good education. He is in all probability the grandchild of the Robert Holmes named provost of Mallow in 1612.

He first appears in 1643 on the Cavalier side of the Civil War, in Prince Maurice's regiment of horse as a cornet in the troop of Captain Richard Atkyns. From this time stems a lifelong friendship with Maurice's brother, Prince Rupert, whom he accompanied onto the battlefields of the continent once the Royalists had been defeated.

=== Start of the naval career ===
When in 1648, a part of the Parliamentary fleet went over to the Royalist side, sailing to the Netherlands and putting itself under the command of Prince Charles, Holmes (now an army captain), following Maurice and Rupert, came into his first contact with the navy.

He participated in the epic cruise of the Royalist fleet of 1649 – 1652 to Kinsale, the Mediterranean, West Africa (where, between the Gambia and Cape Verde, he was arrested by the inhabitants), and the West Indies. The drain of manpower, through storm, action, and mutiny, was so large that at the end of the cruise, Holmes had advanced to commanding the four prizes the force brought back to France. With Rupert returning to the exiled court, it fell to Holmes to see the fleet paid off.

Subsequently, Cromwell's intelligence service reports Holmes having obtained a privateer commission from the King of Spain (Thurloe State Papers VII, p. 248, 18 July 1658. N.S.), although the total absence of other evidence makes his actually setting out as a privateer improbable. He may, like other Royalist, and notably Irish, officers, have taken up service with the Imperial army. His epitaph in Yarmouth gives France, Flanders and Germany as scenes of military exploits. Immediately before the Restoration, Holmes acted as a courier between Charles II and Edward Montagu, by whose commission he obtained his first command in the navy, the Medway guardship Bramble.

== Restoration Officer ==
Upon Charles II's return to England, Holmes was rewarded for his services with the captaincy of Sandown Castle, Isle of Wight together with a new commission (for another guardship), this time from the Duke of York himself, who had assumed the position of Lord High Admiral. But more was in store for him.

=== The first African expedition ===
The reports Rupert had brought back from the Gambia of a "Mountain of Gold" just waiting there to be carried off to England, prompted the Royal African Company, whose director was the Duke of York (and whose paperwork was carried out by William Coventry) to launch an expedition to the Guinea Coast, then mostly in Dutch hands. Holmes, acquainted with this coast, was the man for this venture, and was appointed captain of the flagship, Henrietta and a squadron of four other of the King's ships: Sophia, Amity, Griffin, and Kinsale. His orders (drafted by Coventry) were to assist the company's factors in every way conceivable and to construct a fort. Privately, he was instructed to gather intelligence as to the expected "Mountain of Gold".

The results of the expedition were ambiguous. Touching at Gorée, Holmes bluntly informed the Dutch governor that the King of England claimed the exclusive right of trade and navigation between Cape Verde and the Cape of Good Hope (which the King and Sir George Downing disavowed after protests from the States General and retaliatory action against English shipping). In addition to reconnoitring the coast and the mouth of the Gambia, Holmes constructed a fort there (on Dog Island in the mouth of the river, renamed Charles Island). Up-river, on St. Andreas Island near Jillifri, he then captured a fort which was nominally the Duke of Courland's, but obviously in Dutch hands, and renamed the spit of land James Island. Although the mission did not pay for the company, Holmes seems to have made a profit from it, since subsequently Samuel Pepys, of all people, complained about Holmes's magnificent lifestyle (Diary, 22 December 1661), and wondered whether the large ape Holmes had brought back might be the offspring of a man and a she-baboon and susceptible to instruction (Diary, 24 August 1661).

The expedition was the turning point in Holmes's career. He had shown himself equal to dealing with Africans, company factors, the Dutch and his own men and officers alike, recommending himself as a prudent leader. He consequently was appointed captain of the flagship, HMS Royal Charles, which he lost quickly after having failed to force the Swedish ambassador to salute the flag. But this was only a temporary setback, and he swiftly was granted £800 from the Crown and the command of the newly launched Reserve. The appointment of an inept master led to a quarrel with Pepys, which subsided after a while, but the antagonism between the administrator and the aggressive fighter was never resolved. Aboard Reserve, Holmes tested a pair of pendulum watches conceived by Christiaan Huygens.

=== The second African expedition ===
The objectives of the famous 1664 Guinea expedition are unclear. Although Holmes was charged with exceeding his orders by capturing Dutch forts and ships there, Coventry talks of a "game" that was to be started there, which can only mean an Anglo-Dutch war.

Holmes's orders, again drafted by Coventry and signed by James, were to sail to the Gambia in HMS Jersey and to assist Captain Ladd of the Katherin to 'promote the Interests of the Royall Company' and to 'kill, take, sink or destroy such as shall oppose you' - especially the Goulden Lyon of Flushing, a Dutch West India Company ship, and her sister ship Christiana, that had given the English a lot of trouble.

The reason for the charges against Holmes was that his success exceeded even the most unreasonable expectations, and that he was, diplomatically, a convenient scapegoat (a fact of which he seems to have been aware).

In sight of the Dutch base at Gorée, he took the West Indiaman Brill on 27 December 1663. Stirring up the Portuguese, Africans, and even such Dutch merchants as had a grudge against the West India Company, he sank two ships and captured two others under the guns of Gorée (22 January 1664), and the next day took possession of the fort itself.

On 28 March, in a tactically cunning action, Holmes took the Goulden Lyon, which by then had been renamed Walcheren. The ship was a valuable prize, and according to her captain, James Johnson, was carrying an expensive cargo of mixed goods. She was taken into the Royal Navy as a fourth-rate and handed over to the Royal African Company after the war.

On 10 April, he captured Anta Castle on the Gold Coast and several other small strongholds and ships. But the greatest coup was the capture of the principal Dutch base in West Africa, Cape Coast Castle near El Mina, on 1 May. Contrary to the popular picture, Holmes had no hand in the capture of New Amsterdam.

In August, Michiel de Ruyter had clandestinely been sent to undo what Holmes had achieved. De Ruyter recaptured everything Holmes had conquered, except for Cape Coast Castle, which meant that after 1664, the English were on that coast to stay.

His return to England was desultory, as he tried to make out the repercussions his actions had evoked in London. Since he commanded navy ships, everything he had taken was not automatically the company's property, but would have to be cleared by Admiralty Courts to be prizes of Holmes and his men. Since Holmes's booty in merchandise was far behind the company's (unreasonable) expectations, he was twice committed to the Tower (9 January and 14 February 1665), where he was interrogated by secretaries of state Henry Bennet and William Morrice. This situation was resolved by the Dutch declaration of 22 February that they would retaliate against British shipping, a direct consequence of the goings-on in Africa, that the British conveniently interpreted as a declaration of war.

=== The Second Dutch War ===
Barely a month after his release and full pardon, Holmes assumed command of HMS Revenge, a third-rate of 58 guns, the senior captain of Rupert's white (van) squadron. When at the battle of Lowestoft (3 June 1665) the rear-admiral of the white, Robert Sansum, was killed, Holmes claimed his post (which Rupert endorsed), but James gave the flag to his own flag captain, Harman. Holmes lost his temper and resigned his commission. Even worse, Holmes's rival Sir Jeremiah Smith was promoted to flag rank. But reconciliation was, again, not far away.

On 27 March 1666, the powerful new third-rate Defiance (64) was launched in the presence of Charles II, James and Rupert, Holmes having been appointed captain and being knighted on the occasion. Part of the red squadron, Holmes was finally given acting flag-rank when the fleet was divided to shadow the Dutch and simultaneously intercept the French (which put him, satisfyingly, one step above Harman, rear-admiral of the white - a slighting of the principle of seniority which would have been unthinkable at the end of the century).

During the murderous Four Days Battle, Holmes was reported to have "done wonders", and was confirmed as rear-admiral of the red, his ship having received such a battering that he transferred his flag to the partially burnt and dismasted Henry (72), Harman's ship, who had been wounded. But again, his rivals Sir Jeremiah Smith (made admiral of the blue) and Sir Edward Spragge (vice-admiral of the blue) were promoted above him. These professional rivalries were a hallmark of the restoration navy, and Holmes used the conduct of the St James' Day Fight, to start a bitter quarrel with Sir Jeremiah Smith, whose rear squadron had been routed by Cornelis Tromp. The recriminations between the officers and their respective factions played a role in the subsequent Parliamentary investigation over embezzlement in the naval administration and the conduct of the war.

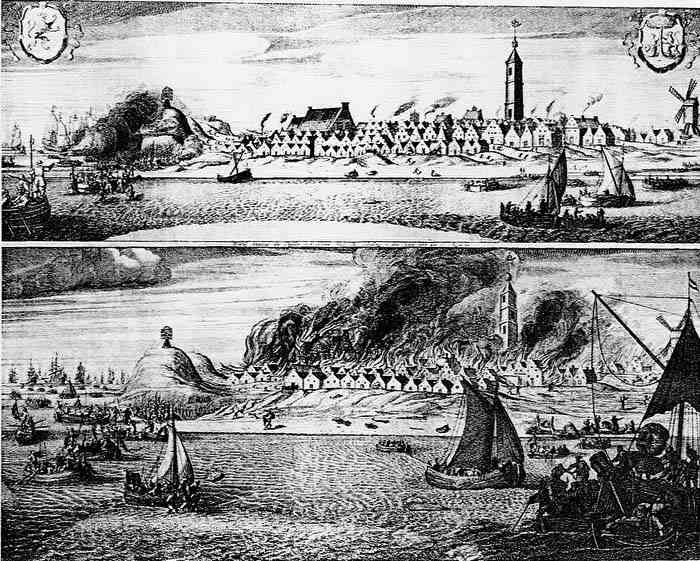
Holmes's Bonfire

On 9 August 1666, Holmes achieved his best-known feat, characteristically (and, to Pepys and Coventry, exasperatingly) using his own judgement in interpreting his orders. Holmes was to land five hundred men on the island of Vlieland and four hundred on Terschelling and loot and destroy as much as possible. Instead of this, Holmes executed a fireship attack on the mass of merchantmen lying in Vlie Road, destroying some 150 ships, and sacked the Mennonite town of West-Terschelling.

This, Holmes's Bonfire, was the heaviest blow the English ever dealt Dutch merchant shipping, severely endangering the Netherlands' war effort, at the cost of no more than twelve English casualties. Holmes was now in high favour. Early in 1667, he was appointed to command a squadron based in Portsmouth and the Isle of Wight, a lucrative appointment that even enabled him to fit one of the squadron's prizes as a privateer. In April 1667, he was commissioned a captain in the 2nd Regiment of Foot Guards, which he resigned before 1670.

As early as December 1666, Pepys had commented on Holmes's stubborn opposition to the laying-up of the fleet in expectation of peace. Holmes was alive to the danger of a Dutch assault - which duly came on 10 June 1667, when Michiel de Ruyter, during the Raid on the Medway entered the Medway, burned a large part of the fleet in ordinary (i.e. laid up) at Chatham and hijacked Royal Charles.

After that year's campaign had ended, Parliament's interest in naval administration intensified, much to Pepys's and Coventry's distress. Rupert and Albemarle, like most naval officers, especially of the Cavalier and gentleman sort, had long been unhappy with the off-hand treatment they received from the administrators. These, in turn, found the officers arrogant and unruly. Now the commanders-in-chief and their clients, Sir Frescheville Holles, Holmes and others, might strike back, especially after the Medway disaster.

In addition, Holmes, in the winter of 1666/1667, had revived the quarrel with Sir Jeremiah Smith (possibly even fighting a duel with him), which only ended when the latter took Sir William Penn's place on the Navy Board (which again Holmes had hoped would be his) in December 1668.

After peace was concluded, Holmes intensified his hold in the Isle of Wight by buying the governorship from Lord Colepeper. This put him in responsibility of the defences there (Sandown, Carisbrooke and Yarmouth Castles), but also gave him access to the very lucrative vice-admiralty of the Isle of Wight, Newport and Hampshire, with two-thirds of the value of all prizes taken there due to him.

In addition, in October 1669, he was elected member of parliament for Winchester, generally supporting the Crown in Parliament.

=== The Third Dutch War ===
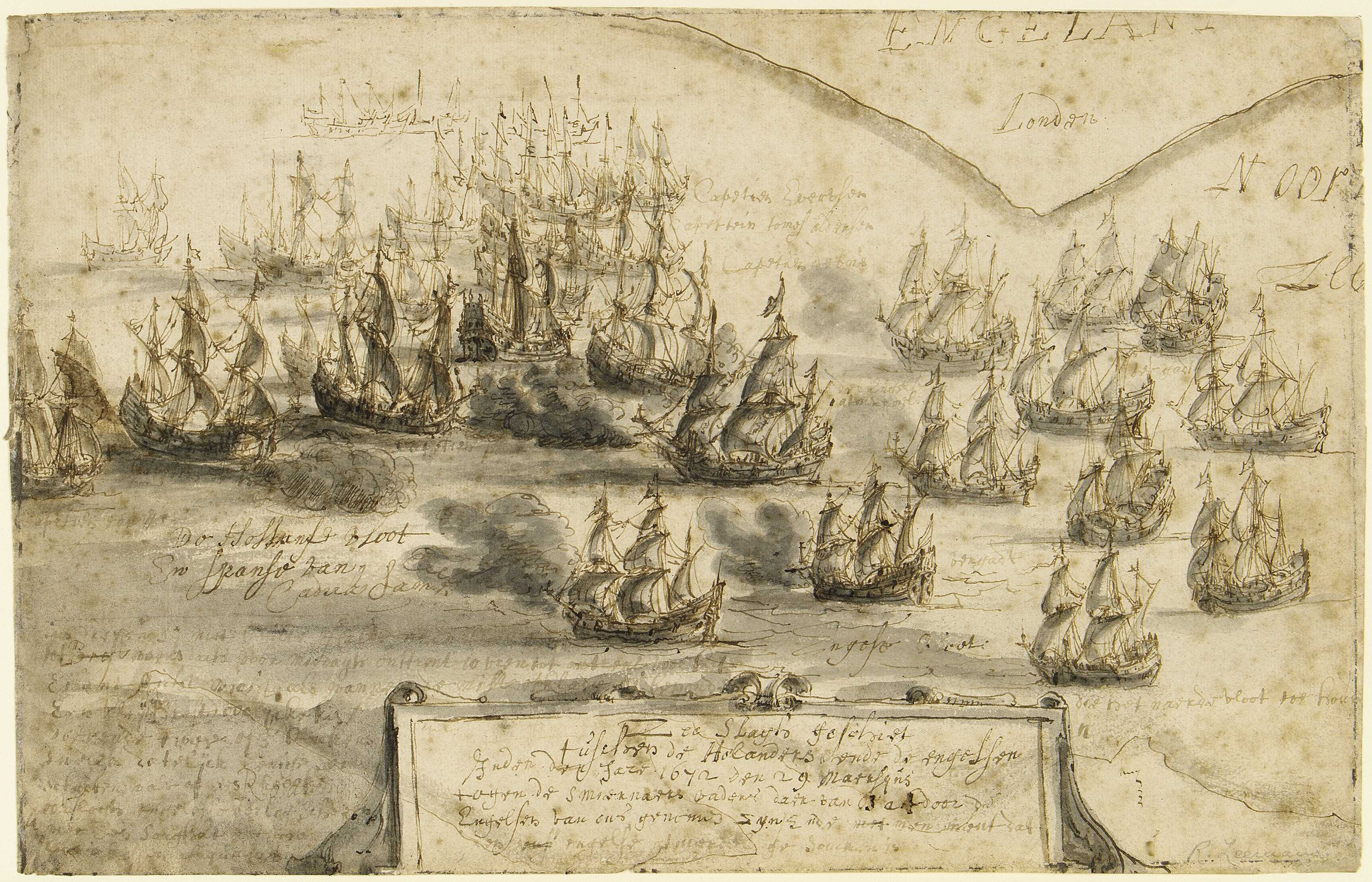
Holmes's attack on the Smyrna Fleet, 12 March 1672

Among the preparations for provoking the Dutch into yet another war, was the appointment of Holmes as senior officer in Portsmouth, commanding a powerful squadron and the flagship St Michael, a first-rate of 90 guns. Holmes immediately pressed for the capture of a large number of Dutch ships, using English harbours under foreign colours; but the government procrastinated until the opportunity was gone.

On 23 March 1672, he finally got permission to attack the homeward-bound Dutch Smyrna convoy. For two days, the English squadron fought a veritable battle with the armed merchantmen and their escorts, suffering damage out of proportion to their gains, half a dozen prizes only one of which seems to have been one of the rich Smyrna ships. Accidentally, Sir Edward Spragge's squadron, returning from the Mediterranean, had passed the scene immediately before the engagement. For unknown reasons, Spragge did not join the attack nor was invited by Holmes to do so, which gave rise to new mutual suspicions. A few days after the fight war was declared and flags handed out. Holmes did not receive one, which may have had to do with the limited number of posts available due to the white squadron this time consisting of the French fleet. Accordingly, Holmes fought in the ensuing Battle of Solebay as a mere captain in the Duke of York's squadron. The battle, the fiercest in De Ruyter's memory, claimed the lives of Holmes's friends Holles and Sandwich, and forced the Lord High Admiral to transfer his flag twice, from Prince to Holmes's St Michael and from that to London. With Sandwich dead, a new flag officer had to be appointed, but Holmes's legitimate claims were again disregarded - for the last time.

After the end of the 1672 campaign, Holmes did not get another command, notwithstanding the constant intercession on his behalf of the new commander-in-chief, his stout friend Prince Rupert. Obviously, the King himself had no desire to re-employ him. Holmes's naval career had very abruptly ended.

== Life in "retirement" ==
Holmes's house (now The George Hotel) in Yarmouth

Although he would not let him serve in his fleet any longer, the King continued to lavish gifts upon Holmes, rents in Hampshire, the Isle of Wight and Wales and forfeited lands in counties Galway and Mayo. He possessed houses in London, Englefield Green near Windsor, Bath, and of course an establishment worthy of a governor in Yarmouth. Most of his time in "retirement", Holmes spent in rebuilding the Isle of Wight's castles and managing parliamentary elections to ensure the return of government candidates. He himself did not run for the Exclusion Bill Parliaments of 1679–1681, and in 1682 he incurred the severest displeasure of Charles II for presenting an address from the Duke of Monmouth. A court martial was prepared together with a warrant to transfer the governorship to the Duke of Grafton, but Holmes either managed to avert prosecution or acquitted himself, for he remained governor until his death.

A stout supporter of his lifelong employers, the royal brothers, it is unclear why Holmes should have associated with Monmouth; at the centre of the question may lie the shady Irish financier Lemuel Kingdon, who sat for Newtown and Yarmouth together with Holmes's brother, John.

Statue of Holmes in Yarmouth Parish Church

On 21 August 1687, secretary of state Sunderland signed a commission that put Holmes in command of a squadron to suppress the buccaneers of the West Indies, but it is doubtful whether he ever actually took command. Since the wound received during the clash with the Smyrna Convoy, his health was steadily deteriorating, and an expedition that sailed in September 1687 was commanded by Sir John Narborough in his stead. Holmes was now busy preparing the defence against Dutch invasion. On 4 November 1688, five sailors of the invasion fleet landed on the Isle of Wight to buy provisions, being welcomed by the population.

While the English fleet lay becalmed off Beachy Head and William III landed his forces at Torbay, Holmes wrestled with his mutinous militia. While James had fled his capital on 11 December (an action Parliament took as his relinquishing the throne) and one day later, the commander-in-chief, Sir George Legge, Lord Dartmouth brought the fleet over to William, it was not before 17 December that Holmes surrendered.

He continued as governor of the Isle of Wight, although he was occasionally suspected of Jacobite conspiracy. But such reservations as he had against the overthrow of James II stemmed from the loyalty of a military professional, and after his vote in parliament against the accession of William and Mary was defeated, he served them with the same determination as he had the Stuart kings. Although his health was now rapidly giving out and he had to spend more and more time of the year in Bath, the threat of French invasions in 1690 and 1692 made him hurry back to his post as swiftly as ever.

== Family ==
Holmes died on 18 November 1692, leaving one illegitimate daughter and heiress, Mary Holmes (born 1678). Her mother is believed to have been Grace Hooke, a niece of the scientist Robert Hooke.

As had been her father's wish, Mary married Henry Holmes, the son of his elder brother Colonel Thomas Holmes of Kilmallock, County Limerick. Her son Thomas, in turn, would eventually achieve the peerage for the family as Lord Holmes of Kilmallock in 1760. Holmes's younger brother, Sir John Holmes, was a naval captain of repute and competence, having for years served together with his eminent brother, and commanded the Channel Fleet (1677–1679).

== Genealogy ==
- Henry Holmes of Mallow, County Cork, Ireland
  - Colonel Thomas Holmes of Kilmallock, County Limerick, Ireland
    - Henry Holmes (c. 1660–1738) m. Mary Holmes (daughter of Admiral Sir Robert Holmes)
      - Thomas Holmes, 1st Baron Holmes (1699–1764)
      - Lieutenant General Henry Holmes (1703–62)
      - Rear Admiral Charles Holmes (1711–1761)
      - Elizabeth Holmes m. Thomas Troughear
        - Leonard (Troughear) Holmes, 1st Baron Holmes (c. 1732–1804) m. Elizabeth Tyrrell (d. 1810)
          - The Hon. Elizabeth Holmes m. Edward Rushout
            - Descendants
  - Admiral Sir Robert Holmes (c. 1622–1692), English Admiral
    - Mary Holmes (wife of Henry Holmes)
      - Lucretia Holmes m. William Sewell
        - Lucretia Sewell m. Edward Hingston of Devon
          - William Hingston (d. 2 Nov 1854 Buffalo, New York) m. Jane Carroll
            - Samuel Hingston m. Anna Anderson
              - Anna Eliza Hingston m. William Roggen Lansing of Rochester, New York, son of William van Kleeck Lansing of Albany, ancestor of the Lansing family of Rochester.
                - Descendants, to include members of the MacCarthy Reagh dynasty and the Lord of the Manor of Didderston.
  - Admiral Sir John Holmes (1640?–1683), English Admiral leader

== Bibliography ==
- Ollard, Richard (1969). Man of War: Sir Robert Holmes and the Restoration Navy. London: Hodder and Stoughton.
- Davies, J.D. (1991). Gentlemen and Tarpaulins: The Officers and Men of the Restoration Navy. Oxford: Oxford University Press.

Parliament of England
Preceded by Thomas Wyndham; William Hewer	Member of Parliament for Yarmouth; 1689–1690; With: Hon. Fitton Gerard	Succeeded by Sir John Trevor; Charles Duncombe
Honorary titles
Preceded by The Lord Colepeper	Governor of the Isle of Wight; 1668–1692	Succeeded by Hon. Thomas Tollemache
Preceded by The Lord Colepeper	Vice-Admiral of Hampshire; 1669–1692	Succeeded by Marquess of Winchester
