= Charles Ambler (barrister) =

English barrister and politician

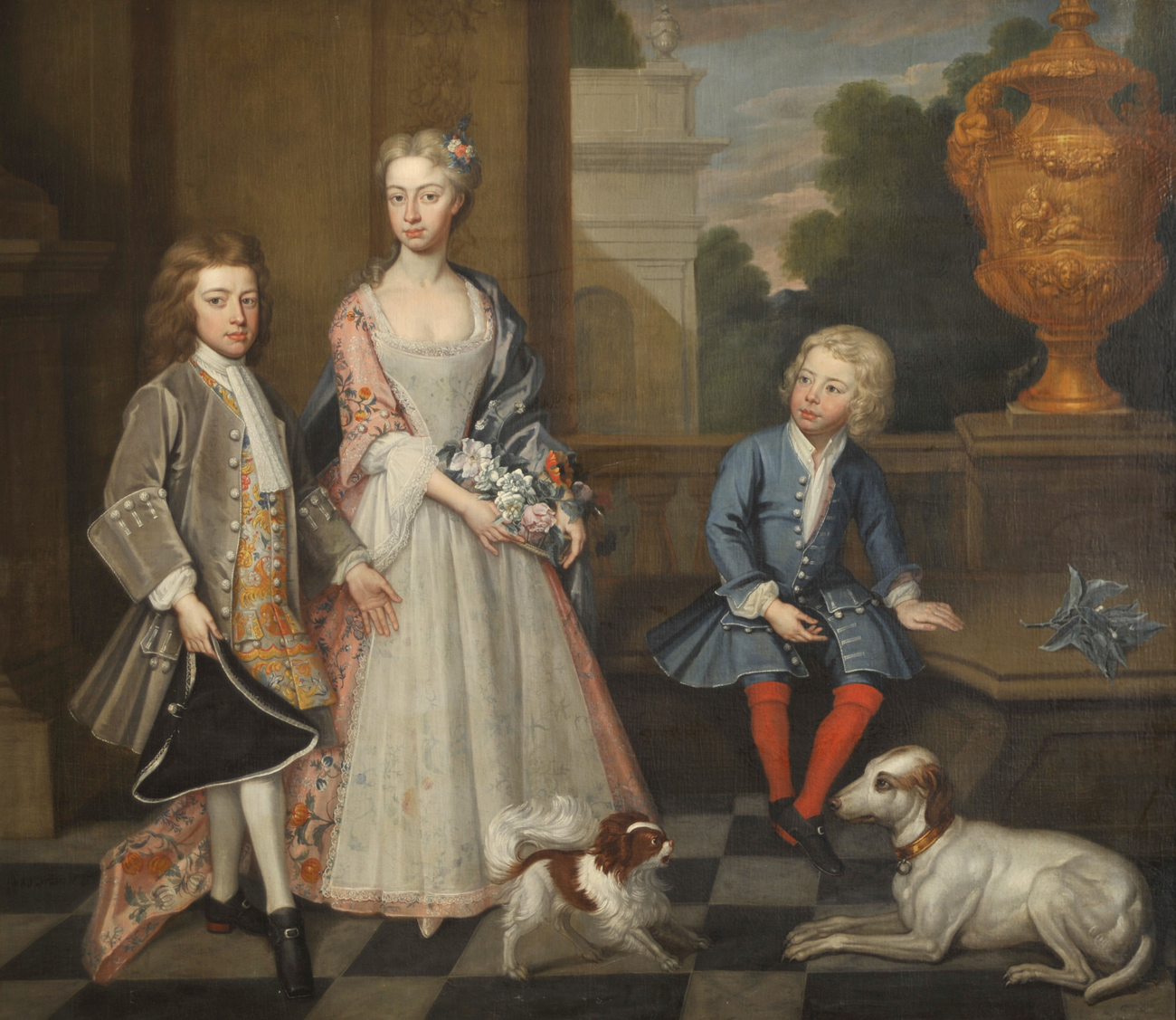
Charles Ambler with his elder brother Humphry and sister Elizabeth by Joseph André Cellony

Charles Ambler (1721 – 28 February 1794) was an English barrister and politician who sat in the House of Commons between 1769 and 1790.

== Early life ==
Ambler was the second son of Humphry Ambler (~1681–1745) barrister of Stubbings Park Maidenhead and Bream's Buildings Chancery Lane, and his wife Ann, daughter of Charles Bream (~1662–1713) timber merchant of Bridewell and Bream's Buildings. Charles's crippled (by a fall when aged eight) epileptic elder brother, Humphry, died of a consumption unmarried in 1752. The Ambler mansion house at Stubbings was built by Humphry Ambler on the site of a small portion of forest acquired with his stepfather Richard Bassett of White Waltham and harvested for shipbuilders.

== Family ==
Charles Ambler married Ann Paxton (1719–1789) second daughter of Nicholas Paxton, solicitor to the treasury under Walpole, 10 May 1746 in the chapel at Somerset House in a nonconformist service, the Ambler family having strong presbyterian connections. Ann and Charles Ambler lived at 3 Queen Square and at Stubbings House. No children survived them, two sons died as schoolboys at Harrow. A small part of her family correspondence is preserved in the Special Collections Department of the University of Birmingham.

He died on 28 February 1794 at his house Stubbings near Maidenhead and was buried nearby at Bisham beside his wife. He was for many years Steward and keeper of the royal manors of Cookham and Bray succeeding his father. His estate was inherited by his sister's son, Elisha Biscoe (1753–1829), who at first leased Stubbings to Lord Dorchester then sold it to him shortly before Dorchester's death in 1808. Biscoe also sold his own father's house at Spring Grove to Sir Joseph Banks in 1808 after Banks had leased it almost 30 years. Biscoe then built Holton Park in Oxfordshire now Wheatley Park School.

== Career at the bar ==
Charles Ambler was educated at Eton from 1732 and admitted to the Middle Temple 29 July 1736. He was called to the bar in 1742. Entered at Lincoln's Inn 26 July 1757 he was made a bencher in 1758 and King's Counsel 6 May 1761.

== House of Commons ==
In 1769 Ambler and Thoroton were put forward by Lord Granby for the Bramber constituency and though defeated they were returned on petition. He did not stand at the following election but in 1775 he was returned for Newtown and provided steady support to North acquiring the name "Tully Ambler, an ironical title which he does not owe to his abilities".

From 1780 he served the Newcastle interest for Saltash, Devon until 1790 when he did not stand again.

== Political appointments ==
He succeeded his wife's kin Sir William Blackstone as solicitor-general to Queen Charlotte 1771–1782 and then her attorney-general 1782–1794

== Law reports ==
In 1790 he published Reports on Cases in Chancery, 1737–83. A revised edition published by Blunt in 1828 has been said to have removed some defects.

Parliament of Great Britain
Preceded by The Lord Winterton; Charles Lowndes	Member of Parliament for Bramber Sussex; 1769–1774; With: Thomas Thoroton	Succeeded by Sir Henry Gough; Thomas Thoroton
Preceded by Harcourt Powell; Sir John Barrington	Member of Parliament for Newtown Isle of Wight; 1775–1780; With: Sir John Barrington 1775–1775; Edward Meux Worsley 1775–1780	Succeeded by Sir John Barrington; Edward Meux Worsley
Preceded by Colonel William Phillips; Anthony Eyre	Member of Parliament for Boroughbridge; 1780–1784; With: Anthony Eyre	Succeeded by The Viscount Palmerston; Sir Richard Sutton, Bt
Preceded by Grey Cooper; Henry Strachey	Member of Parliament for Saltash; 1784–1790; With: Charles Jenkinson 1784–1786; The Earl of Mornington 1786–1787; John Lemon 1787–1790	Succeeded by Edward Bearcroft; Viscount Garlies
