= Hans Stanley =

British politician, militia officer and diplomat

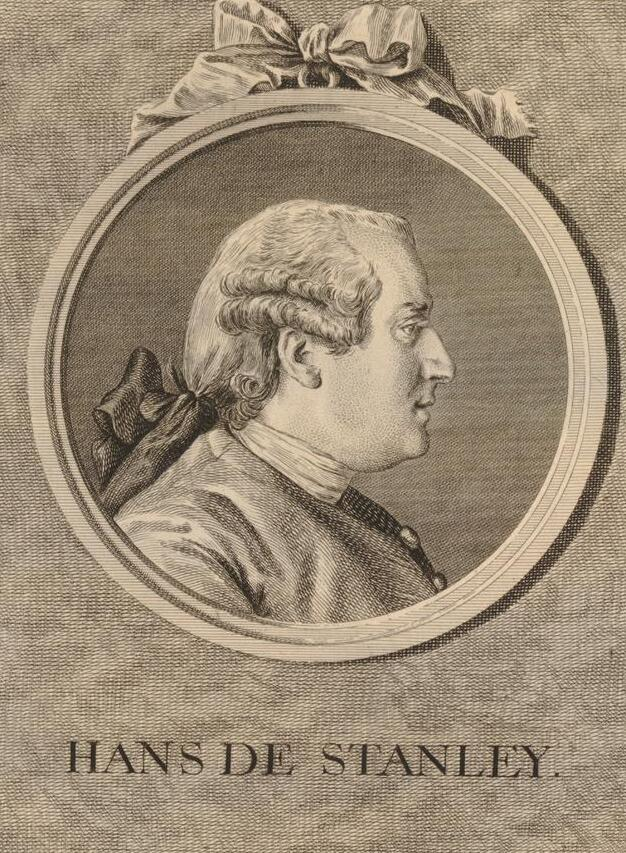
1765 engraving of Stanley

Colonel Hans Stanley, PC (23 September 1721 – 12 January 1780) was a British politician, militia officer and diplomat who represented St Albans and Southampton in the House of Commons of Great Britain between 1743 and 1780.

== Early life ==
Stanley was christened on 9 October 1721 at St Martin-in-the-Fields, London. He was elected as an MP for St. Albans at a by-election on 11 February 1743, and sat for it until the general election in 1747. He had no place in the next parliament, and for a time considered abandoning parliamentary life for diplomacy. He travelled frequently in France, resided for two years at Paris, and studied the law of nations. At the general election of 15 April 1754 he was elected in the Tory interest by the borough of Southampton, and represented it continuously until his death.

Stanley was appointed colonel of the North Hampshire Militia in August 1759 when it was first embodied during the Seven Years' War, but resigned in 1761 in favour of a diplomatic and political career.

== Peace negotiator ==
Hearing from Lord Temple of Pitt's good opinion of him, he recounted in a letter to Pitt of 18 April 1761, his claims to employment should it be desired to open negotiations with France. He was at that time a follower of the Duke of Newcastle, but Pitt enlisted his services, ‘from opinion of his abilities.’ Stanley set out for Calais to meet the French agent on 24 May 1761. Early in the next month he arrived at Paris, and was appointed as Chargé d'affaires at the Embassy to France. He was the representative of the British government in trying to negotiate a peace agreement with France to bring to an end the Seven Years' War. There he remained until 20 September 1761, when it became clear that the mission had ended in failure.

He was appointed to the Lords Commissioners of the Admiralty on 17 June 1762 and became a member of the Privy Council in November of that year. On 7 April 1763 he sent a spirited letter to George Grenville, who was then in office, and to whom he was then attached, declining a seat at the treasury, and setting out how his claims had been neglected. Next August he was at Compiègne. He solicited and obtained in July 1764 the post of Governor of the Isle of Wight or Vice Admiral and constable of Carisbrook Castle. Mary Hervey described the governorship as ‘a very honourable, very convenient employment for him, and also very lucrative.’ At Steephill Manor, on the site of the present castle, near Ventnor, he built a cottage in 1770 at considerable expense, and he entertained there several foreign ambassadors. He resided there until his death in 1780.

== Later life ==
From 1766 to 1767 he was the British ambassador to Russia, though Stanley never went there. Stanley was the Cofferer of the Household for two terms: 1766–1774 and 1776–1780.

Stanley committed suicide by cutting his throat "in a sudden fit of frenzy" on 12 January 1780 at Althorp, the home of John Spencer, 1st Earl Spencer in Northamptonshire.

He was the grandson of Sir Hans Sloane and the first cousin one time removed of John 'Mad Jack' Fuller.

== See also ==
- List of Ambassadors from the United Kingdom to France.
- Great Britain in the Seven Years' War

Parliament of Great Britain
Preceded by James West; Thomas Ashby	Member of Parliament for St Albans; 1743–1747; With: James West	Succeeded by James West; Peter Thompson
Preceded by Peter Delmé; Anthony Langley Swymmer	Member of Parliament for Southampton; 1754–1780; With: Anthony Langley Swymmer to 1760; Henry Dawkins 1760–68; Viscount Palmerston 1760–74; John Fleming 1774–80	Succeeded by John 'Mad Jack' Fuller; John Fleming
Political offices
Preceded by Earl of Scarbrough	Cofferer of the Household; 1766–1774	Succeeded by Jeremiah Dyson
Preceded by Jeremiah Dyson	Cofferer of the Household; 1776–1780	Succeeded by Lord Beauchamp
Honorary titles
Preceded by The Lord Holmes	Governor of the Isle of Wight; 1764–1766	Succeeded by The Duke of Bolton
Preceded by The Lord Holmes	Vice-Admiral of the Isle of Wight; 1765–1767	Succeeded by The Duke of Bolton
Preceded by The Duke of Bolton	Governor of the Isle of Wight; 1770–1780	Succeeded by Sir Richard Worsley
Preceded by The Duke of Bolton	Vice-Admiral of the Isle of Wight; 1771–1780	Succeeded by Sir Richard Worsley
Diplomatic posts
Preceded by George Macartney, 1st Earl Macartney	Ambassador from Great Britain to Russia; 1766–1767	Succeeded by George Macartney, 1st Earl Macartney
