= Edward Meux Worsley =

British politician

Edward Meux Worsley (1747–1782) was a British politician from the Isle of Wight who sat in the House of Commons between 1774 and 1782.

Worsley was the eldest son of Sir Edward Worsley of Gatcombe and his wife Elizabeth Miller, daughter of Sir John Miller, 2nd Baronet. In 1762, he succeeded to Gatcombe on the death of his father. He matriculated at New College, Oxford on 28 June 1764, aged 17.

His first wife was Elizabeth Crow of Alvington, Isle of Wight whom he married on 25 August 1768. She died in 1771.

He married secondly Elizabeth Holmes, daughter of Rev. Leonard Holmes of Newport, Isle of Wight on 19 August 1772.

Worsley was returned as Member of Parliament for Yarmouth (Isle of Wight) at the 1774 general election on the interest of his father-in-law. He vacated his seat in February 1775 to allow in his second cousin, James Worsley and was then returned unopposed as MP for Newtown (Isle of Wight) under Holmes control at a by-election on 4 December 1775. At the 1780 general election he was again returned at Newtown unopposed. He did not stand in 1784. There is no record of any intervention by him in a debate.

Worsley died in August 1782. He had a daughter by his first wife, and a son and daughter by his second wife. He is commemorated in the streetname Worsley Road, Newport.

Parliament of Great Britain
| Preceded by Thomas Dummer; Major General the Hon. George Lane Parker | Member of Parliament for Yarmouth (Isle of Wight); 1774–1775; With: Jervoise Clarke Jervoise | Succeeded by James Worsley; Jervoise Clarke Jervoise |
| Preceded by Sir John Barrington; Charles Ambler | Member of Parliament for Newtown (Isle of Wight); 1775–1782; With: Charles Ambler; John Barrington | Succeeded by Henry Dundas; John Barrington |
