= Newtown (constituency) =

Former parliamentary constituency in the United Kingdom

- Former borough constituency for the House of Commons
- County: Isle of Wight
- Major settlements: Newtown

1584–1832
- Seats: Two
- Created from: Hampshire
- Replaced by: Isle of Wight

Newtown was a parliamentary borough located in Newtown on the Isle of Wight, which was represented in the House of Commons of England until 1707, then in the House of Commons of Great Britain from 1707 to 1800, and finally in the House of Commons of the United Kingdom from 1801 to 1832. It was represented by two members of parliament (MPs), elected by the bloc vote system.

The borough was abolished in the Reform Act 1832, and from the 1832 general election its territory was included in the new county constituency of Isle of Wight.

== History ==
Newtown, located on the large natural harbour on the north-western coast of the Isle of Wight, was the first borough established in the county. A French raid in 1377, which destroyed much of the town as well as other settlements on the island, sealed its permanent decline. By the mid-16th century it was a small settlement long eclipsed by the more easily defended town of Newport. To try to stimulate economic development, Elizabeth I awarded the town two parliamentary seats.

Newtown was a burgage borough, meaning that the right to vote was vested solely in the owners of a specified number of properties or "burgage tenements". At the time of the Reform Act 1832 there were 39 burgage tenements, held by 23 burgesses; however, most of these held only life grants. It was common practice for life grants to be made to friends of the proprietors so as to ensure that the full voting power could be exercised; if these nominees failed to vote as expected, they could be ejected and replaced by somebody more reliable before the next election. These voters were often non-resident – and indeed, it could hardly be otherwise, for although there were 39 burgage tenements, there were only 14 houses. Unlike many rotten boroughs, no single landowner controlled a majority of the burgages: the reversionary rights in them belonged to three families (Barrington, Holmes and Anderson-Pelham), with none having an overall majority. Elections in the borough consequently required careful management and sometimes considerable expenditure to achieve the desired result. In the 1750s and 1760s, the arrangement was that one of the two seats was considered to be in the gift of the Barrington family, while Thomas Holmes (who also nursed the other two Isle of Wight boroughs, Newport and Yarmouth, for the government) negotiated the election of the government's nominee for the other, unless he wanted it for a member of the Holmes family.

By 1831, the borough had a population of just 68, and it was disestablished the following year by the Reform Act.

== Members of Parliament ==
=== 1584–1640 ===
Parliament	First member	Second member
1584	William Meux	Robert Redge
1586	Richard Huyshe	Richard Dillington
1588	Richard Huyshe	Richard Sutton
1593	Thomas Dudley	Richard Browne
1597	Silvanus Scory	Thomas Crompton
1601	Robert Wroth	Robert Cotton
1604	Sir John Stanhope ennobled and replaced 1605 by Thomas Wilson	William Meux
1614 (Mar)	George Stoughton (sat for Guildford) and replaced 1614 by William Higford	Sir Henry Berkeley
1621 (Jan)	John Ferrar (sat for Tamworth) and replaced 1621 by Sir William Harington	Sir Thomas Barrington
1624 (Jan)	George Garrard	Sir Gilbert Gerard, Bt (sat for Middlesex)
1624 (Mar)	George Garrard	Sir Thomas Barrington
1625	Sir Thomas Barrington	Thomas Malet
1626	Sir Thomas Barrington	Thomas Malet
1628–1629	Sir Thomas Barrington, 2nd Baronet	Robert Barrington
1629–1640	No Parliaments summoned	

=== 1640–1832 ===
Year	First member	First party	Second member	Second party
April 1640	John Meux	Royalist	Hon. Nicholas Weston	
November 1640	John Meux	Royalist	Hon. Nicholas Weston	Royalist
August 1642	John Meux	Royalist	Weston disabled from sitting – seat vacant	
February 1644	Meux disabled from sitting – seat vacant		Weston disabled from sitting – seat vacant	
1645	Sir John Barrington		John Bulkeley	
December 1648	Barrington and Bulkeley excluded in Pride's Purge – seat vacant			
1653	Newtown was unrepresented in the Barebones Parliament and the First and Second Parliaments of the Protectorate			
January 1659	Serjeant John Maynard		William Laurence	
May 1659	Not represented in the restored Rump			
April 1660	Sir John Barrington		Sir Henry Worsley	
1666	Sir John Barrington		Sir Robert Worsley	
1677	Sir John Barrington		Admiral Sir John Holmes	
February 1679	John Churchill		Admiral Sir John Holmes	
August 1679	Lemuel Kingdon		Admiral Sir John Holmes	
1681	Daniel Finch		Admiral Sir John Holmes	
1685	Thomas Done		William Blathwayt	Whig
1689	Thomas Done		The Earl of Ranelagh	
1695	Thomas Done		James Worsley	
1698	Thomas Hopsonn		James Worsley	
1701	Thomas Hopsonn		Joseph Dudley	
1702	Thomas Hopsonn		John Leigh	
1705	James Worsley		Henry Worsley	
1715	James Worsley		Sir Robert Worsley	
1722	William Stephens		Charles Worsley	
1727	James Worsley		Thomas Holmes	Whig
1729	Charles Armand Powlett		Sir John Barrington	
1734	James Worsley		Thomas Holmes	Whig
1741	Sir John Barrington		Henry Holmes	
1747	Sir John Barrington		Maurice Bocland	
1754	Sir John Barrington		Harcourt Powell	
April 1775	Sir John Barrington		Charles Ambler	
December 1775	Edward Meux Worsley		Charles Ambler	
1780	Edward Meux Worsley		John Barrington	
1782	Henry Dundas	Tory	John Barrington	
1783	Richard Pepper Arden		John Barrington	
April 1784	James Worsley		John Barrington	
August 1784	Mark Gregory		John Barrington	
1790	Sir Richard Worsley	Whig	John Barrington	
1793	George Canning	Tory	John Barrington	
1796	Sir Richard Worsley	Whig	Charles Shaw-Lefevre	Whig
1801	Sir Edward Law	Whig	Charles Shaw-Lefevre	Whig
May 1802	Ewan Law		Charles Shaw-Lefevre	Whig
July 1802	Sir Robert Barclay	Whig	Charles Chapman	Whig
1805	Sir Robert Barclay	Whig	James Paull	Whig
1806	Sir Robert Barclay	Whig	George Canning	Tory
1807	Barrington Pope Blachford	Tory	Dudley Long North	Whig
1808	Barrington Pope Blachford	Tory	Hon. George Anderson-Pelham	Whig
1816	Hudson Gurney	Whig	Hon. George Anderson-Pelham	Whig
1820	Hudson Gurney	Whig	Dudley Long North	Whig
1821	Hudson Gurney	Whig	Charles Cavendish	Whig
1830	Hudson Gurney	Whig	Hon. Charles Anderson-Pelham	Whig
1831	Hudson Gurney	Whig	Sir William Horne	Whig
1832	Constituency abolished			

== See also ==
- Isle of Wight
- Newport (Isle of Wight) (UK Parliament constituency)
- Politics of the Isle of Wight
- Parliamentary representation from Isle of Wight
