= James Worsley =

British politician

James Worsley (1725–1787) was a British politician who sat in the House of Commons between 1775 and 1784.

Worsley was the eldest son of David Worsley of Stenbury and his wife Mary Hooke, daughter of William Hooke and was born on 10 April 1725.

Worsley was returned as Member of Parliament for Yarmouth (Isle of Wight) at a by-election on 6 February 1775 presumably on the Holmes interest. He was replacing his second cousin Edward Meux Worsley. In the 1784 general election he was returned as MP for Newtown (Isle of Wight). He may have been brought in by his distant cousin Sir Richard Worsley as a stop-gap since he resigned his seat a few months later in August 1784. It appears that he never spoke in Parliament.

Worsley died on 10 April 1787

Parliament of Great Britain
Preceded by Edward Meux Worsley; Jervoise Clarke Jervoise	Member of Parliament for Yarmouth (Isle of Wight); 1775–1780; With: Jervoise Clarke Jervoise 1775-1779; Captain Robert Kingsmill 1779-1780	Succeeded by Edward Morant; Edward Rushworth
Preceded by Richard Pepper Arden; John Barrington	Member of Parliament for Newtown (Isle of Wight); 1784–1784; With: John Barrington	Succeeded by Mark Gregory; John Barrington
