= William Hewer =

English politician (1642–1715)

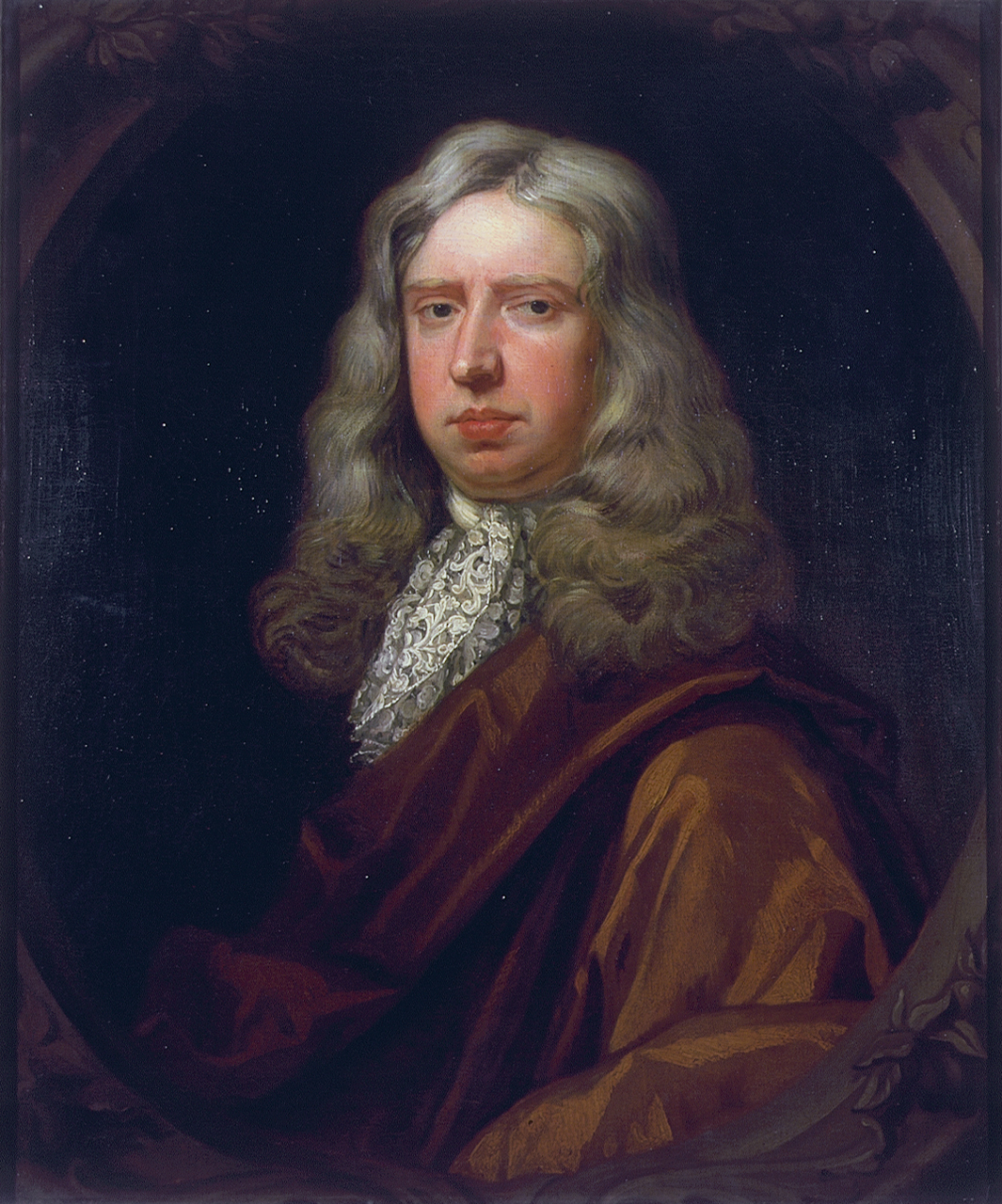
William Hewer as painted by Sir Godfrey Kneller, 1689. This portrait, along with one of Samuel Pepys painted by Kneller, remained with Pepys family heirs until the 20th century.

William Hewer (1642 – 3 December 1715), sometimes known as Will Hewer, was one of Samuel Pepys' manservants, and later Pepys's clerk, before embarking on an administrative career of his own. Hewer is mentioned several times in Pepys' diary and was ultimately the executor of Pepys' will.

== Pepys' manservant ==
Hewer was employed by Samuel Pepys as a manservant and office clerk for Pepys' work as the new Clerk of the Acts to the Navy Board. By November 1663, Hewer was able to move out of Pepys' house and have his own lodgings.

Hewer was initially introduced to Pepys by Hewer's uncle Robert Blackborne, whose sister was Hewer's mother, and who was a longtime Pepys friend with whom he worked at the Admiralty. It has been said that the biggest favor Blackborne did for Pepys was the introduction of his nephew Hewer to Pepys in 1660.

== Hewer in Pepys' diary ==
Hewer is frequently mentioned in Pepys' diary as a trusted friend as well as an assistant. As their relationship developed, it became a professional partnership as well as a personal friendship. When Pepys moved to the Admiralty in 1673, Hewer moved to the Admiralty as well and became Chief Clerk the following year. In 1677, he was appointed as Judge Advocate-General.

== Hewer late career ==
In 1685, he became MP for Yarmouth, Isle of Wight. He was appointed to the Special Commission which replaced the Navy Board in 1686 with responsibility for accounts. After the deposition of James II in 1689, Pepys and Hewer lost their patronage from the Crown; both were briefly imprisoned, but were released without trial.

Hewer managed to become very rich. He made much of it through his involvement in trading with his uncle Blackborne, who became Secretary to the Admiralty, and later Secretary to the British East India Company.

Like Pepys, Hewer also received payments from those doing business with the Navy, but suspicions of illicit payments were never proved and he did not hold a lucrative office for any length of time. He probably also inherited from his father, who was a merchant, as Pepys' diary mentions his increased expenditures after his father's death in 1665. By 1674, Hewer was wealthy enough to finance the construction of three warships. He became a director of the old East India Company in 1698 and served two terms as its Deputy Chairman. He also served as Treasurer of Tangier.

My wife told me how she had moved to W. Hewer the business of my sister for a wife to him, which he received with mighty acknowledgements, as she says, above anything; but says he hath no intention to alter his condition

— Diary of Samuel Pepys, 16 January 1667

He owned a house near The Strand which became the Admiralty Office when he and Pepys moved from the Navy Board. Pepys also lived in the house while he was at the Admiralty.

He bought an estate in the then-village of Clapham in 1688 which he used as a country retreat. (Hewer also owned other property in Clapham, London, Westminster, Norfolk and elsewhere.) Pepys went to live in Hewer's house on Clapham Common in his old age and died there in 1703. Hewer was the executor of Pepys' will and retained Pepys' library and book collection including his famous diary until he died on 3 December 1715. Wiliam Hewer is buried in St Paul's Church, Clapham. The memorial to Hewer in St Paul's Church was designed by Francis Bird and modelled on the Memorial to Maria Raggi by Gian Lorenzo Bernini in Santa Maria sopra Minerva in Rome.

Hewer never married and so devised that his estate go to his godson Hewer Edgeley on the condition that he change his surname to Hewer. This the heir did, becoming Hewer Edgeley-Hewer. Subsequently, lawsuits arose over the immense Hewer estate. In 1684 William Hewer was admitted to the Freedom of the Clothworkers' Company, and was immediately sworn in as a member of the Court of Assistants. He was elected Master of the Clothworkers' Company for the 1686–87-year. In 1687 he donated a barge to the Clothworkers' Company. It seems that he did not attend a single Court meeting during his Mastership.

Parliament of England
Preceded by Sir Thomas Littleton; Lemuel Kingdon	Member of Parliament for Yarmouth; 1685–1689; With: Thomas Wyndham	Succeeded by Sir Robert Holmes; Hon. Fitton Gerard
