= General Powlett =

General Powlett may refer to:

- Charles Armand Powlett (c. 1694–1751), British Army major general
- Charles Powlett, 3rd Duke of Bolton (1685–1754), British Army lieutenant general
- Charles Powlett, 5th Duke of Bolton (c. 1718–1765), British Army lieutenant general
