= Henry Holmes (Yarmouth MP, died 1738) =

Anglo-Irish Army officer, landowner and Tory politician (d.1738)

Major Henry Holmes

Lieutenant-Governor of the Isle of Wight
- In office 1710–1714
- Monarch: Anne
- Preceded by: Anthony Morgan
- Succeeded by: Anthony Morgan

Governor of Hurst Castle
- In office 1702–1714
- Monarch: Anne
- Preceded by: John Burrard
- Succeeded by: Sir Tristram Dillington
- In office 1683–1695
- Monarchs: Charles II; James II & VII; William III & II and Mary II
- Preceded by: Sir John Holmes
- Succeeded by: John Burrard

Member of Parliament for Yarmouth (Isle of Wight)
- In office 1695–1717 Serving with Charles Duncombe; Anthony Morgan; Sir Gilbert Dolben, 1st Baronet; Robert Raymond
- Monarchs: William III & II; Anne; George I
- Preceded by: Sir John Trevor; Charles Duncombe
- Succeeded by: Anthony Morgan; Sir Theodore Janssen

Personal details
- Born: 1660
- Died: 23 June 1738 (aged 77–78)
- Party: Tory
- Spouse: Mary Holmes (cousin)
- Children: Thomas Holmes (son); Henry Holmes (son); Charles Holmes (son)
- Parent: Thomas Holmes
- Relatives: Sir Robert Holmes (uncle); Sir John Holmes (uncle)
- Military career
- Allegiance: United Kingdom
- Branch: British Army
- Service years: 1687–1695
- Rank: Lieutenant (1687), Captain (1689), Major (1692)
- Units: Grenadier Guards, 8th Foot

Henry Holmes (c. 1660 – 23 June 1738) of Thorley, Yarmouth, Isle of Wight, was an Anglo-Irish Army officer, landowner and Tory politician who was Lieutenant-Governor of the Isle of Wight (1710–14) and sat in the English and British House of Commons from 1695 to 1717.

== Early life ==
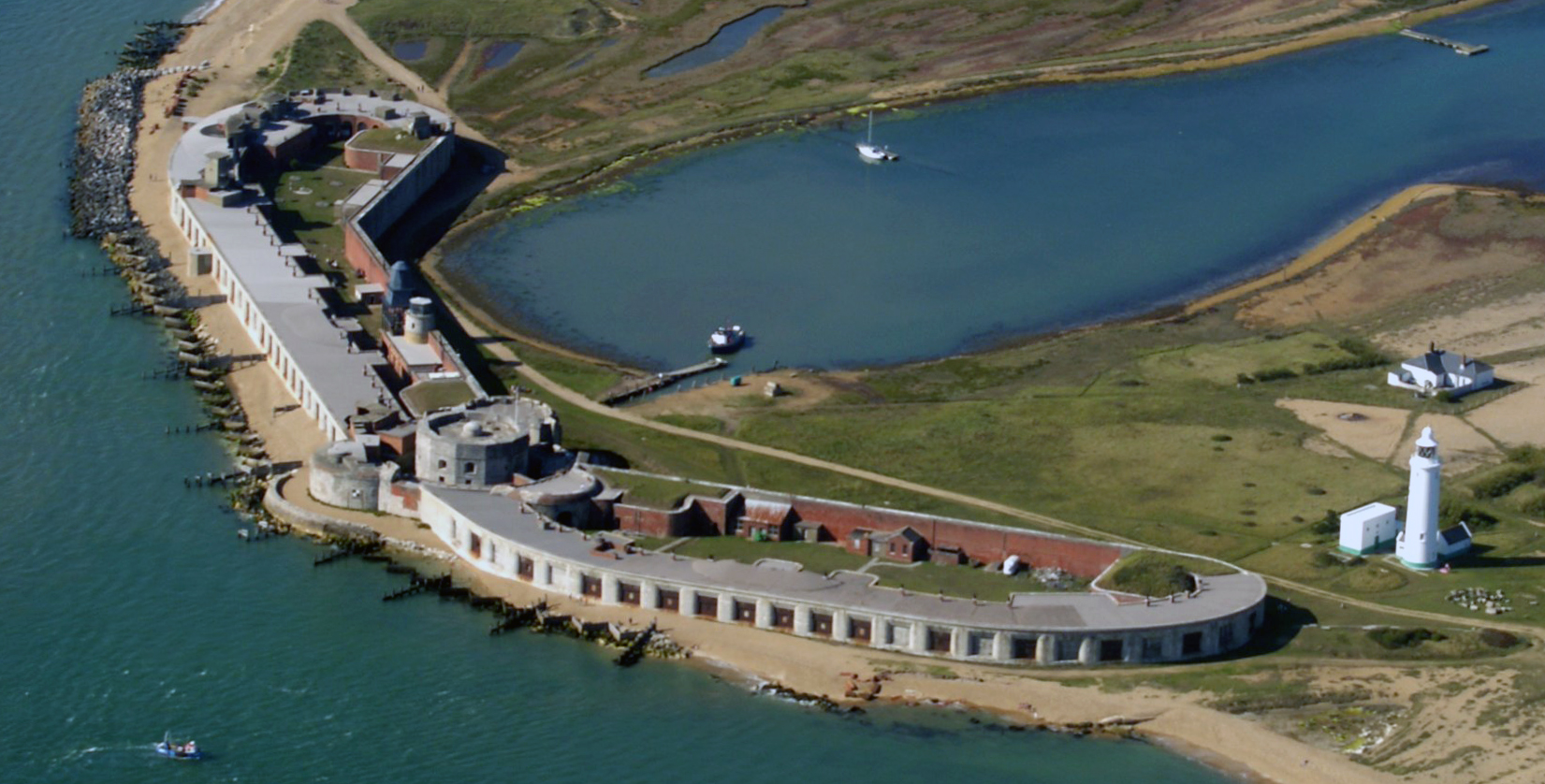
Hurst Castle

Holmes was the son of Thomas Holmes of Kilmallock, County Limerick and joined the Army. He was appointed Captain of Hurst Castle on the Isle of Wight in 1683.

== Military career ==
In March 1687 he was a Lieutenant in a company of Grenadiers, and in November 1687 became Lieutenant in the 8th Foot. He was a Captain in 1689 and Major in 1692. In 1692, his uncle, Sir Robert Holmes of Thorley, left him his estates, provided he married Sir Robert's illegitimate daughter, Mary. Holmes married this Mary Holmes within 18 months and left the army.

== Political career ==
In 1695, Holmes lost the governorship of Hurst Castle after opposing the Governor of the Isle of Wight, Lord Cutts. However, he was returned as Member of Parliament for Yarmouth (Isle of Wight) on his own interest at a by election on 2 April 1695 and followed up being returned in a contest at the 1695 English general election. His dispute with Lord Cutts continued in the House of Commons, as he accused Cutts of discharging militia officers in Yarmouth who had voted against Holmes' rival, Cutts' brother-in-law John Acton. He refused to sign the Association, and in March 1696 voted against fixing the price of guineas at 22 shillings. In 1697, the House had to intervene to prevent a duel between Holmes and Lord Cutts. At the 1698 English general election, with the dispute with Cutts resolved, Holmes was returned unopposed as MP for Yarmouth. He was returned unopposed at the two general elections of 1701 as a Tory.

In 1702, Holmes was restored to his post as Governor of Hurst Castle, and he was returned unopposed again at the 1702 English general election. He was relatively inactive, but voted for the Tack on 28 November 1704. At the 1705 English general election, he was returned unopposed again and voted against the Court candidate for Speaker on 25 October 1705. He was returned as a Tory at the 1708 British general election and voted against the impeachment of Dr Sacheverell in 1710. At the 1710 British general election, he was returned again for Yarmouth as a Tory, and with the change of Administration was appointed Lieutenant-Governor of the Isle of Wight in 1710. He was listed as a 'worthy patriot' who helped detect the mismanagements of the previous ministry in 1711. He was returned again as a Tory at the 1713 British general election but lost his post as Lieutenant-Governor on the Hanoverian succession. He was returned at a contest at the 1715 British general election, and voted against the septennial bill in 1716, but was unseated on petition on 12 April 1717.

== Death and legacy ==
Holmes died on 23 June 1738, having had, with his wife, eight sons and eight daughters. His sons Thomas, Henry, and Charles all sat in Parliament for Isle of Wight constituencies.

== Genealogy ==
- Henry Holmes of Mallow, County Cork, Ireland
  - Colonel Thomas Holmes of Kilmallock, County Limerick, Ireland
    - Henry Holmes (c. 1660–1738) m. Mary Holmes (daughter of Admiral Sir Robert Holmes)
      - Thomas Holmes, 1st Baron Holmes (1699–1764)
      - Lieutenant General Henry Holmes (1703–62)
      - Rear Admiral Charles Holmes (1711–1761)
      - Elizabeth Holmes m. Thomas Troughear
        - Leonard (Troughear) Holmes, 1st Baron Holmes (c. 1732–1804) m. Elizabeth Tyrrell (d.1810)
          - The Hon. Elizabeth Holmes m. Edward Rushout
            - Descendants
  - Admiral Sir Robert Holmes (c. 1622–1692), English Admiral
    - Mary Holmes (wife of Henry Holmes)
  - Admiral Sir John Holmes (1640?–1683), English Admiral leader

Parliament of England
Preceded by Sir John Trevor; Charles Duncombe	Member of Parliament for Yarmouth (Isle of Wight); 1695–1707; With: Charles Duncombe 1695; Anthony Morgan 1695–1707	Succeeded by Parliament of Great Britain
Parliament of Great Britain
Preceded by Parliament of England	Member of Parliament for Yarmouth (Isle of Wight); 1707–1717; With: Anthony Morgan 1707–1710; Sir Gilbert Dolben, 1st Baronet 1710–1715; Robert Raymond 1715–1717	Succeeded by Anthony Morgan; Sir Theodore Janssen
Honorary titles
Preceded by Anthony Morgan	Lieutenant-Governor of the Isle of Wight; 1710–1714	Succeeded by Anthony Morgan
Preceded by John Burrard	Governor of Hurst Castle; 1702–1714	Succeeded by Sir Tristram Dillington
Preceded by Sir John Holmes	Governor of Hurst Castle; 1683–1695	Succeeded by John Burrard
