= Charles Holmes (Royal Navy officer) =

Royal Navy officer and politician (1711–61)

Rear-Admiral Charles Holmes
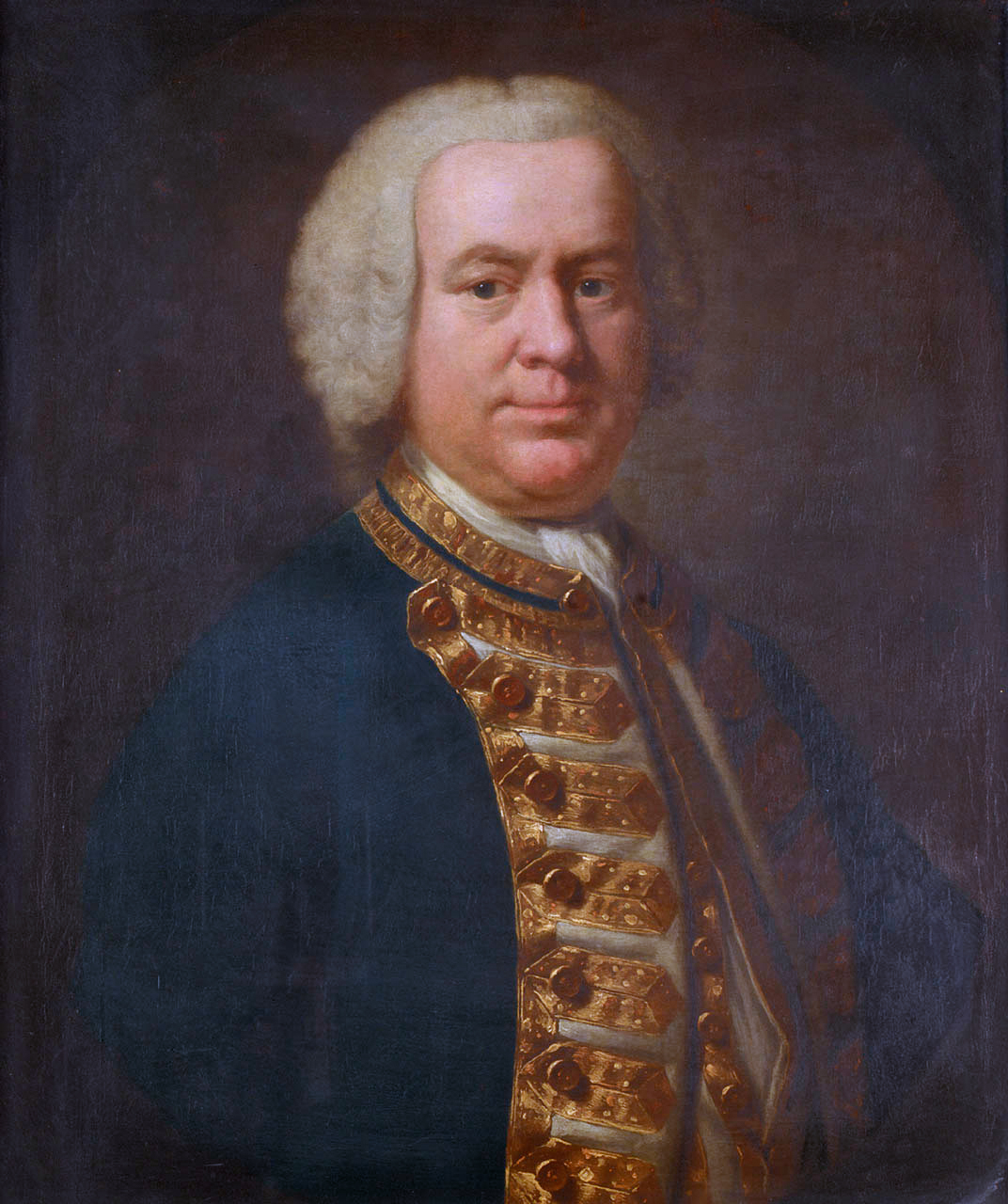
- Portrait attributed to Nathaniel Dance-Holland

Member of Parliament for Newport
- In office 1758–1761

Personal details
- Born: 19 September 1711
- Died: 21 November 1761 (aged 50) Jamaica
- Parent: Henry Holmes (father)
- Relatives: Thomas Holmes; Henry Holmes; Sir Robert Holmes (grandfather); Sir John Holmes (uncle)
- Military career
- Allegiance: Great Britain
- Branch: Royal Navy
- Service years: 1727–1761
- Rank: Rear-admiral
- Commands: HMS Strombolo; HMS Success; HMS Sapphire; HMS Cornwall; HMS Enterprise; HMS Lenox; HMS Anson; HMS Grafton; Commander-in-Chief Weser; HMS Warspite; Jamaica Station
- Conflicts: War of the Austrian Succession; Battle of Cartagena de Indias; Battle of Santiago de Cuba; Battle of Havana; Seven Years' War; Battle of the Windward Passage

Rear-Admiral Charles Holmes (19 September 1711 – 21 November 1761) was a Royal Navy officer and politician who served in the War of the Austrian Succession and Seven Years' War. He was Wolfe's third-in-command during the capture of Quebec in 1759. Holmes is also known for leading a British squadron up the River Ems in 1758, leading directly to the capture of Emden.

== Early life ==
Holmes was the fourth son of Colonel Henry Holmes, Lieutenant-Governor of the Isle of Wight. His maternal grandfather Admiral Sir Robert Holmes, who had overseen Holmes's Bonfire, was one of England's most noted naval leaders during the Anglo-Dutch Wars of the previous century.

Joining the navy at the age of 16, Charles Holmes was promoted to lieutenant in 1734 and received his first command in 1741. In 1747 he was given command of HMS Lenox, one of the biggest warships in the navy, but peace was signed the following year and he would serve for the next few years in British waters.

== Seven Years' War ==
When the Seven Years' War broke out, he was commanding HMS Grafton, and was sent under Admiral Holburne to reinforce Admiral Boscawen's force in the Atlantic, assisting in the interception of a French squadron bound for North America and the capture of the Alcide and the Lys in April 1755.

In 1758 Holmes was sent as Commodore of a small squadron (two frigates, a cutter and a bomb ketch) to the Ems where, despite one of the frigates running aground in the river and having to be sent home, he succeeded in capturing Emden from the French. Soon afterwards he was promoted to rear admiral, and the following year was appointed third-in-command under Admiral Saunders of the naval expedition up the St Lawrence river to besiege Quebec, his flagship being HMS Lowestoffe. He succeeded in getting a squadron of ships and troop transports past the French batteries, and was therefore able to put Wolfe and his troops ashore beyond the city, safely and in absolute silence, allowing its eventual capture after the Battle of the Plains of Abraham.

In March 1760, Holmes was appointed Commander-in-Chief of the Jamaica Station, during his time there his fleet destroyed a French convoy in the Windward Passage in October 1760. Holmes died in Jamaica in November 1761. There is a memorial to him in Westminster Abbey.

Holmes was elected Member of Parliament for Newport, Isle of Wight in 1758, and held the seat until his death three years later. (Two of his brothers, General Henry Holmes and Thomas Holmes were also MPs for Isle of Wight constituencies.) He was also a member of the court martial that tried and condemned Admiral Byng in 1757. He was a known patron of brothel keeper Jane Douglas.

== Sources ==
- Cundall, Frank (1915). Historic Jamaica. West India Committee.

Parliament of Great Britain
Preceded by Thomas Lee Dummer; Ralph Jenison	Member of Parliament for Newport (Isle of Wight); 1758–1761; With: Thomas Lee Dummer	Succeeded by Thomas Lee Dummer; William Rawlinson Earle
Military offices
Preceded by Thomas Cotes	Commander-in-Chief, Jamaica Station; 1760–1761	Succeeded by Sir James Douglas
