= List of vice-admirals of Hampshire =

Vice Admiral of Hampshire
- Active: 1558-1846
- Country: United Kingdom
- Branch: Royal Navy
- Type: Naval administration
- Role: Admiralty court and Naval Jurisdiction.

The Vice-Admiral of Hampshire was responsible for the defence of the county of Hampshire, England.

== History ==
As a vice-admiral, the post holder was the chief of naval administration for his district. His responsibilities included pressing men for naval service, deciding the lawfulness of prizes (captured by privateers), dealing with salvage claims for wrecks and acting as a judge.

The earliest record of an appointment was of Sir Adrian Poynings from 1558 to 1571.

In 1863 the Registrar of the Admiralty Court stated that the offices had 'for many years been purely honorary' (HCA 50/24 pp. 235–6). Appointments were made by the Lord High Admiral when this officer existed. When the admiralty was in commission, appointments were made by the crown by letters patent under the seal of the admiralty court.

== Vice-admirals of Hampshire ==
This is a list of people who have served as Vice-Admiral of Hampshire. A separate Vice-Admiral of the Isle of Wight was appointed from 1569 to 1571, and from 1734 to 1807, although during the latter period, the Vice-Admiral of Hampshire intermittently held both posts.

- Sir Adrian Poynings 1558–1571
- Sir Edward Horsey 1571–1583
- William Plasted 1583–1584 jointly with
- Edmund Yonge 1583 and
- Thomas Plasted 1583–1584
- George Carey, 2nd Baron Hunsdon 1584–1603
- Henry Wriothesley, 3rd Earl of Southampton 1603–1624
- Edward Conway, 1st Viscount Conway 1624–1631
- Richard Weston, 1st Earl of Portland 1631–1635
- Jerome Weston, 2nd Earl of Portland 1635–1642
- vacant
- Philip Herbert, 4th Earl of Pembroke 1644–1647 (Parliamentary)
- Robert Hammond 1647–1649 (Parliamentary)
- Charles Fleetwood 1650–1652 jointly with (Parliamentary)
- William Sydenham 1650–1660 (Parliamentary)
- Sir Anthony Ashley Cooper, 2nd Baronet 1660
- Jerome Weston, 2nd Earl of Portland 1660–1662
- Thomas Colepeper, 2nd Baron Colepeper 1662–1669
- Sir Robert Holmes 1669–1692
- Charles Paulet, 2nd Duke of Bolton 1692–1710
- John Richmond Webb 1710–1714
- Charles Paulet, 2nd Duke of Bolton 1714–1722
- Charles Powlett, 3rd Duke of Bolton 1722–1733
- John Wallop, 1st Viscount Lymington 1733–1742
- Charles Powlett, 3rd Duke of Bolton 1742–1754
- Harry Powlett, 4th Duke of Bolton 1755–1759
- Charles Powlett, 5th Duke of Bolton 1759–1765
- vacant
- Harry Powlett, 6th Duke of Bolton 1767–1794
- vacant
- George Paulet, 12th Marquess of Winchester 1797–1800
- vacant
- Thomas Orde-Powlett, 1st Baron Bolton 1803–1807
- James Harris, 2nd Earl of Malmesbury 1807–1831
- Charles Anderson-Pelham, 1st Earl of Yarborough 1831–1846

== Vice-admirals of the Isle of Wight ==
- Edward Horsey 1567–1571
- held by Hampshire
- John Wallop, 1st Viscount Lymington 1734–1742
- Charles Powlett, 3rd Duke of Bolton 1742–1746 (also Vice-Admiral of Hampshire)
- John Wallop, 1st Earl of Portsmouth 1746–1762
- Thomas Holmes, 1st Baron Holmes 1763–1764
- Hans Stanley 1765–1767
- Harry Powlett, 6th Duke of Bolton 1767–1771 (also Vice-Admiral of Hampshire)
- Hans Stanley 1771–1780
- Sir Richard Worsley, 7th Baronet 1780–1791
- Thomas Orde-Powlett, 1st Baron Bolton 1791–1807 (also Vice-Admiral of Hampshire from 1803)
- held by Hampshire
