= Stubbings =

Hamlet in Berkshire, England

Coordinates: 51.526°N 0.779°W

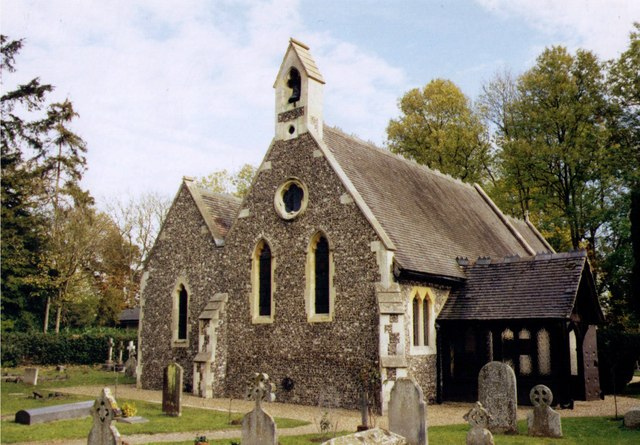
St James the Less

Stubbings is a hamlet in the civil parish of Bisham, west of Maidenhead, in the English county of Berkshire.

== History ==
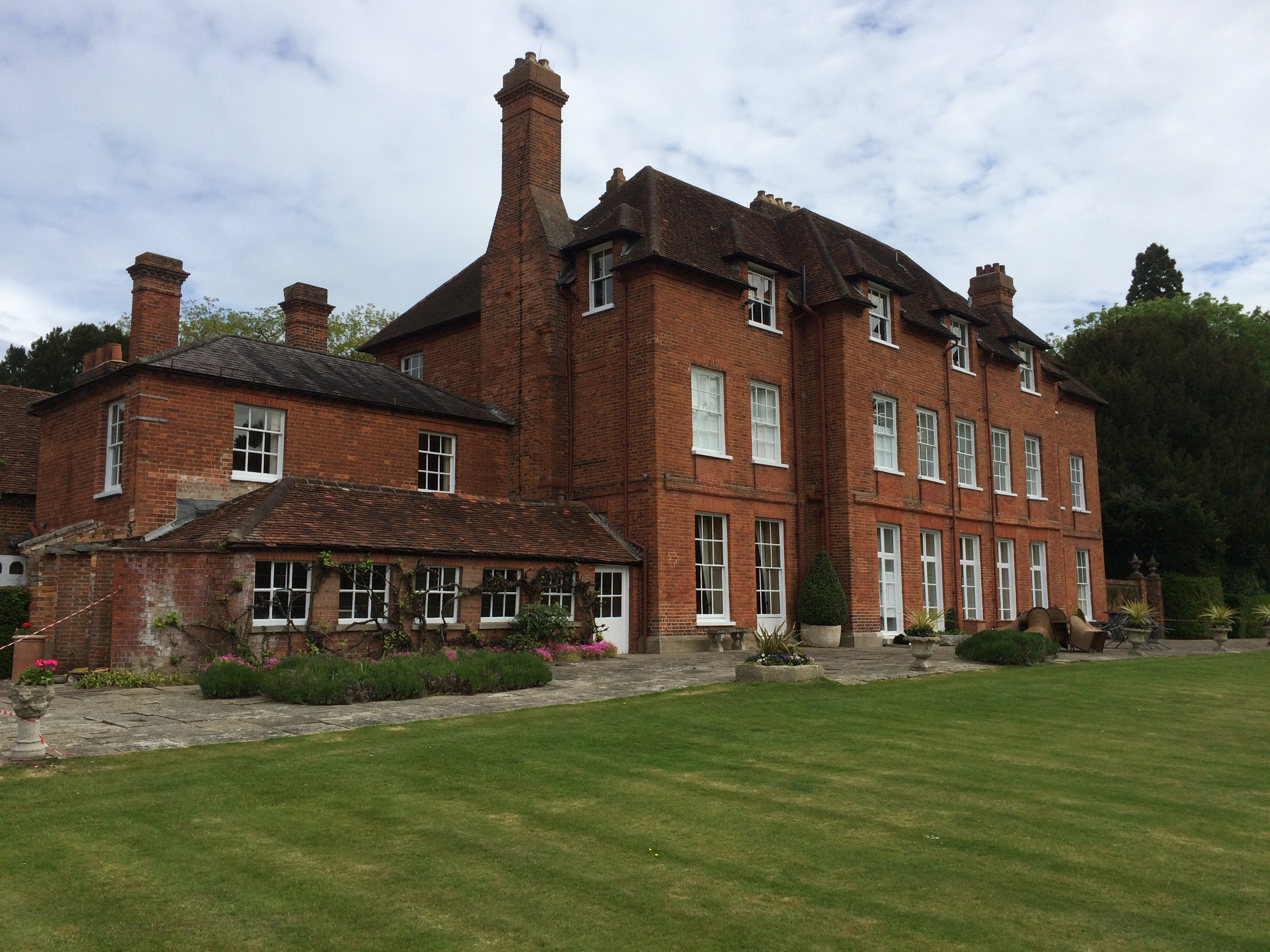
Stubbing's House

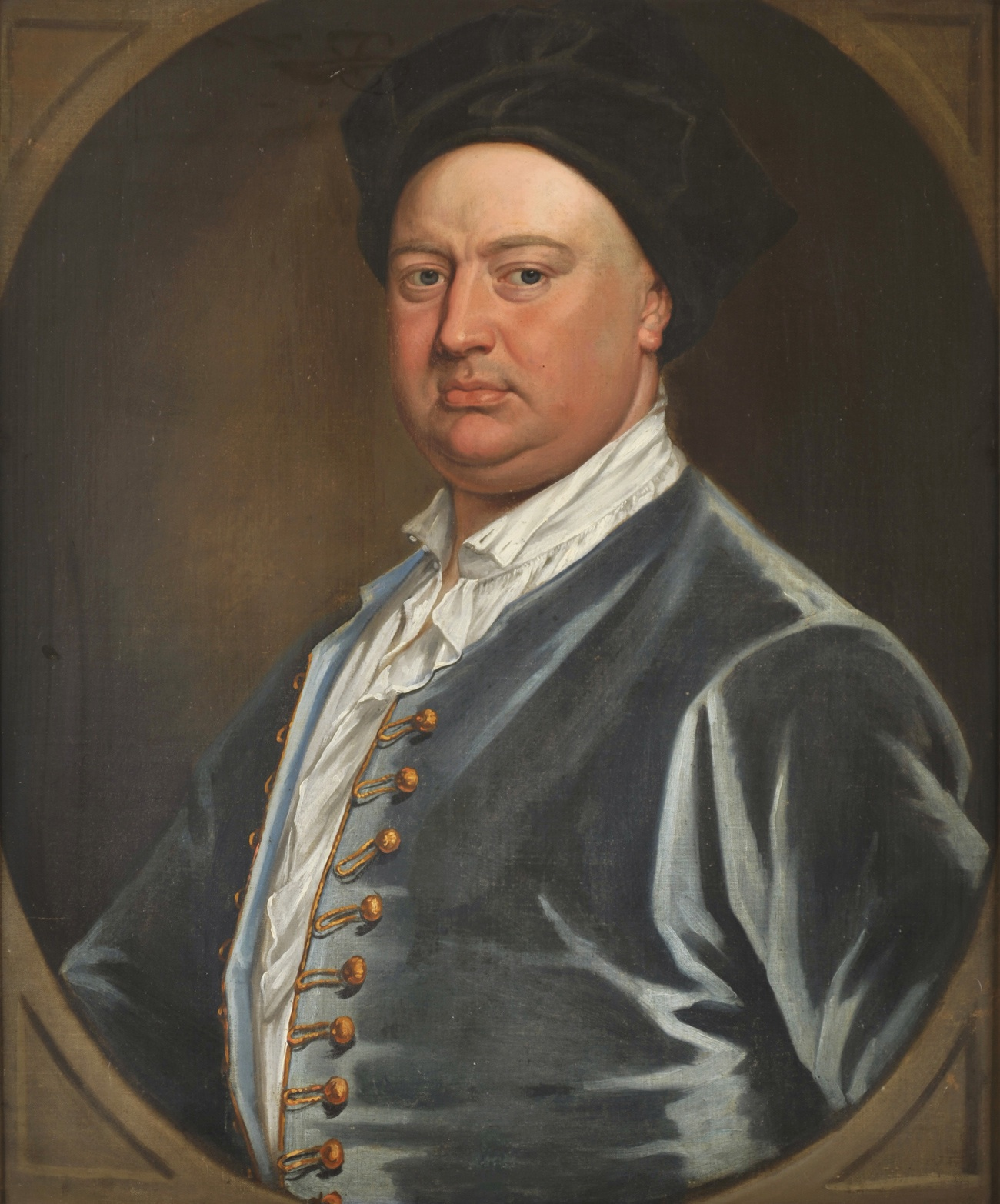
Humphry Ambler 1680-1745 attrib. George Knapton

Stubbings House mansion was very briefly the home of Guy Carleton, 1st Baron Dorchester, the Governor of Quebec and later, during World War II, of Queen Wilhelmina of the Netherlands. Another notable resident from 1947 to 1969 was physicist Sir Thomas Merton inventor of the "one-shilling rangefinder" which brought down flying bombs at a range of 300 yards.

The house, built by barrister Humphry Ambler about 1740, is located on an 80-acre (32 ha) estate just east of Burchetts Green.
