= Yarmouth (Isle of Wight) (constituency) =

Former parliamentary constituency in the United Kingdom

Yarmouth
- Former borough constituency for the House of Commons
- County: Isle of Wight
- Major settlements: Yarmouth

1584–1832
- Seats: Two
- Created from: Hampshire
- Replaced by: Isle of Wight

Yarmouth was a borough constituency of the House of Commons of England then of the House of Commons of Great Britain from 1707 to 1800 and of the House of Commons of the United Kingdom from 1801 to 1832. It was represented by two members of parliament (MPs), elected by the bloc vote system.

The constituency was abolished by the Reform Act 1832, and from the 1832 general election its territory was included in the new county constituency of Isle of Wight.

== Boundaries ==
The constituency was a Parliamentary borough on the Isle of Wight, part of the historic county of Hampshire. Its boundaries were coterminous with the parish of Yarmouth. At the time that it was disfranchised, there were 114 houses in the borough and town, and a population of only 586.

== History ==
The borough was seen as a rotten borough and in the late eighteenth century was managed, together with the other Isle of Wight boroughs of Newtown and Newport by Thomas Holmes.

== Members of Parliament ==
=== MPs 1584–1640 ===
Parliament	First member	Second member
1584	Arthur Gorges	William Stubbs
1586	Thomas West	John Duncombe
1588	Daniel Hills	John Howe
1593	Robert Dillington	Robert Crosse
1597	Benedict Barnham	John Snow
1601	William Cotton	Stephen Theobald
1604	Arthur Bromfield	Thomas Cheeke
1614	Arthur Bromfield	Thomas Cheeke
1621–1622	Arthur Bromfield	Thomas Risley
1624	William Beeston	Thomas Risley
1625	Edward Clarke sat for Hythe replaced by Sir John Suckling	John Oglander
1626	Sir Edward Conway	Sir John Oglander
1628–1629	Edward Dennis	Sir John Oglander
1629–1640	No Parliaments summoned	

=== MPs 1640–1832 ===
Year	First member	First party	Second member	Second party
April 1640	William Oglander		John Bulkeley	
November 1640	Philip Sidney	Parliamentarian	Sir John Leigh	Parliamentarian
December 1648	Philip Sidney	Parliamentarian	Leigh excluded in Pride's Purge – seat vacant	
1653	Yarmouth was unrepresented in the Barebones Parliament and the First and Second Parliaments of the Protectorate			
January 1659	John Sadler		Richard Lucy	
May 1659	Philip Sidney		One seat vacant in the restored Rump	
February 1660	Philip Sidney		Sir John Leigh	
April 1660	Richard Lucy		Sir John Leigh	
1661	Richard Lucy		Edward Smith	
1678	Thomas Lucy		Edward Smith	
February 1679	Thomas Lucy		Sir Richard Mason	
August 1679	Thomas Wyndham		Sir Richard Mason	
1681	Lemuel Kingdon		Sir Thomas Littleton	
1685	Thomas Wyndham		William Hewer	
1689	Sir Robert Holmes		Hon. Fitton Gerard	
1690	Sir John Trevor	Tory	Charles Duncombe	Tory
April 1695	Henry Holmes	Tory	Charles Duncombe	Tory
November 1695	Henry Holmes	Tory	Anthony Morgan	
1710	Henry Holmes	Tory	Sir Gilbert Dolben, 1st Baronet	Tory
1715	Henry Holmes	Tory	Sir Robert Raymond	Tory
1717	Colonel Anthony Morgan		Sir Theodore Janssen	
1721 by-election	Colonel Anthony Morgan		William Plumer	
1722	Colonel Anthony Morgan		Thomas Stanwix	
1725 by-election	Colonel Anthony Morgan		Colonel Maurice Morgan	
1727	Paul Burrard		Colonel Maurice Morgan	
1733 by-election	Paul Burrard		Maurice Bocland	
1734	Paul Burrard		Lord Harry Powlett	Whig
1736 by-election	Thomas Gibson		Lord Harry Powlett	Whig
1737 by-election	Thomas Gibson		Anthony Chute	
1741 by-election	Thomas Gibson		Colonel Maurice Bocland	
1744 by-election	Robert Carteret		Colonel Maurice Bocland	
1747	Thomas Holmes	Whig	Colonel Henry Holmes	
1762 by-election	Thomas Holmes	Whig	Jeremiah Dyson	Tory
1765 by-election	John Eames		Jeremiah Dyson	Tory
1768	William Strode		Jervoise Clarke	Whig
1769	Thomas Dummer		Major General the Hon. George Lane Parker	
1774	Edward Meux Worsley		Jervoise Clarke	Whig
1775 by-election	James Worsley		Jervoise Clarke	Whig
1779 by-election	James Worsley		Captain Robert Kingsmill	
1780	Edward Morant		Edward Rushworth	
1781 by-election	Edward Morant		Sir Thomas Rumbold	
1784	Edward Morant		Philip Francis	
1787 by-election	Thomas Clarke Jervoise		Philip Francis	
1790	Thomas Clarke Jervoise		Edward Rushworth	
1791 by-election	Jervoise Clarke Jervoise	Whig	Sir John Leicester, Bt	
1796	Jervoise Clarke Jervoise	Whig	Edward Rushworth	
1797 by-election	Jervoise Clarke Jervoise	Whig	William Peachy	
1802	Jervoise Clarke Jervoise	Whig	James Patrick Murray	
February 1803 by-election	Jervoise Clarke Jervoise	Whig	Colonel Charles Macdonnell	
October 1803 by-election	Jervoise Clarke Jervoise	Whig	Henry Swann	Tory
February 1804 by-election	Jervoise Clarke Jervoise	Whig	John Delgarno	
March 1804 by-election	Jervoise Clarke Jervoise	Whig	Captain Sir Home Riggs Popham	
January 1806 by-election	Jervoise Clarke Jervoise	Whig	David Scott	
November 1806	Jervoise Clarke Jervoise	Whig	Thomas William Plummer	
May 1807	Jervoise Clarke Jervoise	Whig	Hon. William Orde-Powlett	
August 1807 by-election	Jervoise Clarke Jervoise	Whig	Admiral Sir John Orde	
January 1808 by-election	Benjamin Griffinhoofe		Admiral Sir John Orde	
April 1808 by-election	John Delgarno		Admiral Sir John Orde	
June 1808 by-election	George Annesley		Admiral Sir John Orde	
1810 by-election	Thomas Myers		Admiral Sir John Orde	
1812	Richard Wellesley		Sir Henry Montgomery, Bt	
1816 by-election	Richard Wellesley		John Leslie Foster	Tory
1817 by-election	Alexander Maconochie	Tory	John Leslie Foster	Tory
March 1818 by-election	John Copley	Tory	John Leslie Foster	Tory
June 1818	John Taylor	Tory	William Mount	Tory
1819 by-election	Sir Peter Pole	Tory	John Wilson Croker	Tory
1820	Sir Peter Pole	Tory	Theodore Broadhead	Tory
1821 by-election	Sir Peter Pole	Tory	Theodore He	Tory
1826	Thomas Hamilton	Tory	Joseph Phillimore	Tory
1827 by-election	Thomas Wallace	Tory	Joseph Phillimore	Tory
1830	William Yates Peel	Tory	George Lowther Thompson	Tory
1831	Sir Henry Willoughby	Whig	Charles Cavendish	Whig
1832	Constituency abolished			

== See also ==
- Politics of the Isle of Wight
- Parliamentary representation from Isle of Wight
- Great Yarmouth (UK Parliament constituency) in Norfolk
