= Steephill Manor =

Steephill Manor is a British manor house on the Isle of Wight, situated within the Newchurch parish.

The manor was a holding of the Lisle family towards the end of the 13th century, until it was sold by the Hills to John Hambrough, who erected Steephill Castle in 1835, which has since been demolished. The house occupies the site of a cottage where Hans Stanley lived during his governorship of the island. As of 1912 it belonged to a Mr. John Morgan Richards.
