= Battle of the Windward Passage =

1760 naval battle of the Seven Years' War

Battle of the Windward Paassage
- Part of the Seven Years' War
Date	17–19 October 1760
Location	Windward Passage, Caribbean
Result	British victory

Belligerents
Great Britain	France

Commanders and leaders
(Kingdom of Great Britain) Charles Holmes	(Kingdom of France) Unknown

Strength
2 frigates 1 post ship	4 frigates 1 corvette 3 merchant ships

Casualties and losses
light	200 casualties 3 frigates lost 1 corvette lost 3 merchant ships lost

The Battle of the Windward Passage was a small naval action between French and British fleets that occurred on 17 to 19 October 1760 during the Seven Years' War. The action took place in the Caribbean between Cap-Français and Eastern Cuba and resulted in a British victory.

== Events ==
Background

At dawn on 17 October 1760, Admiral Charles Holmes in the 50-gun Hampshire (1741), Captain Coningsby Norbury, took HMS Boreas, Samuel Uvedale, and the 20-gun HMS Lively, Frederick Lewis Maitland, to intercept a French convoy they had sighted in the Windward Passage. The convoy was escorted by the 32-frigates Sirène, Duc de Choiseul, Prince Edward, and Fleur de Lys, and the 20-gun corvette Valeur.

Battle

The British gave chase but light winds slowed hampered them so it was evening before the lead ship Boreas could engage Sirène. French fire disabled Boreas aloft with the result that Boreas could not engage Sirène again until the following afternoon. (Note: Sirène was armed with twenty-six 8-pounder guns on the gun deck and four 6-pounder guns on the quarterdeck. She had been built by Jacques-Luc Coulomb at Brest in 1744.) Boreas emerged victorious from the engagement, capturing Sirène, which suffered about 80 men killed and wounded, most of whom died later; Boreas lost only one man killed and one wounded.

The next day Lively, using her sweeps, caught up at daybreak with the rearmost French vessel, Valeur. She had a crew of 160 men under the command of a Captain Talbot. Lively overhauled her off the eastern tip of Cuba and pounded her into submission after an engagement of 90 minutes. Lively had two men killed but no wounded; Valeur had 38 killed and 25 wounded, including her captain, master, and boatswain.

At the same time Hampshire, off the coast of Sainte Domingue, chased the frigate Prince Edward on shore where the 180 crewmen under the command of Captain Dubois set fire to her, causing her to blow up. Duc de Choiseul, with 180 men under the command of Captain Bellevan, escaped into Port-de-Paix. Fleur de Lys, with 190 crewmen under the command of Captain Diguarty, was found in an unprotected bay to leeward on 19 October; her crew scuttled her to prevent capture by Hampshire. The British also captured three merchant frigates to complete the victory.

Aftermath

The two merchant vessels carried cargoes of sugar and indigo and had only been a day out of Cap-Français.

Cambridge, Boreas, Hussar, and Viper, shared by agreement in the prize money for Sirene, Valeur, the merchant ships Maria, Elizabeth, and Pursue.

== See also ==
- Great Britain in the Seven Years' War
