= Sir James Worsley, 5th Baronet =

British politician and land owner

Sir James Worsley, 5th Baronet (1672–1756), of Pylewell Park, Hampshire, was a British landowner and politician who sat in the English and British House of Commons between 1696 and 1741. He tended to support whichever administration was in power.

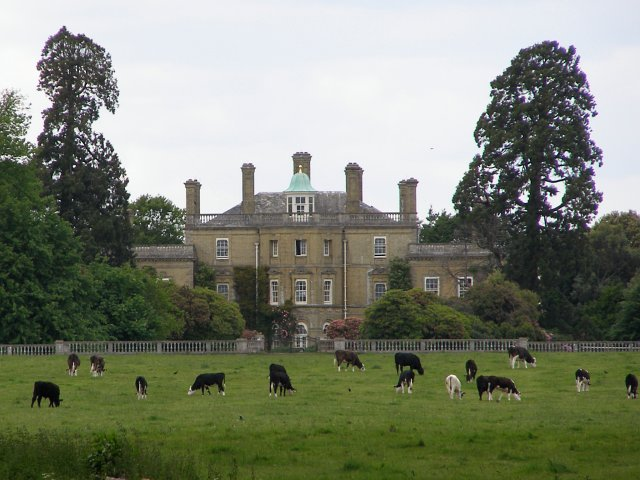
Pylewell Park, Hampshire

Worsley was baptized on 28 May 1672, the eldest son of Sir James Worsley of Pylewell Park and his wife Mary Steward, daughter of Sir Nicholas Steward, 1st Baronet, of Hartley Mauditt, Hampshire. His father had moved to Hampshire from the family's traditional home at Appuldurcombe on the Isle of Wight. James matriculated at New College, Oxford, in 1688; and was admitted at Middle Temple in 1691. His father died in 1695 and he succeeded to his estates.

At the 1695 English general election, Worsley was returned unopposed as Member of Parliament for Newtown (Isle of Wight) on the interest of his cousin Sir Robert Worsley, 4th Baronet. He was returned again at the 1698 English general election and at the first general election of 1701. He was relatively inactive in these parliaments, and his political inclinations remained vague. He did not stand in the second general election of 1701 or at the 1702 English general election. He was returned unopposed with his cousin Henry at the 1705 English general election and voted for the Court candidate as Speaker on 25 October 1705. He was classified as a Whig, but for the rest of his career, he supported whichever administration was in power. He was returned again at the 1708 British general election, and though classed as a Tory, he voted for the naturalization the Palatines in 1709, and for the impeachment of Dr Sacheverell in 1710. He was returned unopposed at the 1710 British general election and became firmly aligned with the Tory administration. He received as a reward the post of Woodward of the New Forest at a salary of £150 p.a. He joined the October Club and in 1711 was listed as a ‘worthy patriot’ who detected the mismanagements of the previous administration. He voted for the French commerce bill on 18 June 1713, and was considered a Tory who sometimes voted as a Whig. He was returned again as MP for Newtown at the 1713 British general election. He married Rachel Merrick, daughter of Thomas Merrick of St. Margaret's, Westminster on 25 February 1714.

At the 1715 general election Worsley was returned as MP for Newtown with his cousin Sir Robert Worsley, 4th Baronet, but lost his post under the new administration. He did not stand in 1722. There was a contest at the 1727 general election and he was initially returned but then unseated on petition on 25 April 1729. He was returned unopposed at the 1734 general election and did not stand in 1741.

Worsley succeeded his cousin the 4th Baronet in the baronetcy on 29 July 1747 but not to Appuldurcombe House, which went in trust for his son. He died on 12 June 1756 leaving one son Thomas, who succeeded him in the baronetcy. His grandson Sir Richard Worsley, 7th Baronet was an antiquarian who came into possession of ‘the Worsley list’, an analysis of the 1713 and 1715 Parliaments, probably compiled by the private secretary of King George I.

Parliament of England
Preceded by Thomas Done; The Earl of Ranelagh	Member of Parliament for Newtown (Isle of Wight); 1695–1701; With: Thomas Done; Thomas Hopsonn	Succeeded by Thomas Hopsonn; Joseph Dudley
Preceded by Thomas Hopsonn; John Leigh	Member of Parliament for Newtown (Isle of Wight); 1705–1708; With: Henry Worsley	Succeeded by Parliament of Great Britain
Parliament of Great Britain
Preceded by Parliament of England	Member of Parliament for Newtown (Isle of Wight); 1708–1722; With: Henry Worsley 1708–1715; Sir Robert Worsley, Bt 1715–1722	Succeeded by William Stephens; Charles Worsley
Preceded by William Stephens; Charles Worsley	Member of Parliament for Newtown (Isle of Wight); 1727–1729; With: Thomas Holmes	Succeeded by Charles Armand Powlett; Sir John Barrington, Bt
Preceded by Charles Armand Powlett; Sir John Barrington, Bt	Member of Parliament for Newtown (Isle of Wight); 1734–1741; With: Thomas Holmes	Succeeded by Sir John Barrington, Bt; Henry Holmes
Baronetage of England
Preceded by Robert Worsley	Baronet (of Appuldurcombe); 1747–1756	Succeeded by Thomas Worsley
