= Henry Holmes (British Army officer) =

British Army officer and politician (1703–1762)

Lieutenant-General Henry Holmes

Lieutenant-Governor of the Isle of Wight
- In office 1754–1762
- Monarchs: George II; George III
- Preceded by: Charles Armand Powlett
- Succeeded by: John Stanwix

Member of Parliament for Yarmouth (Isle of Wight)
- In office 1747–1762
- Preceded by: Robert Carteret, 3rd Earl Granville; Maurice Bocland
- Succeeded by: Thomas Holmes; Jeremiah Dyson

Personal details
- Born: 1703
- Died: 11 August 1762 (aged 58–59)
- Spouse: Anne Lysaght
- Parent: Henry Holmes (father)
- Relatives: Thomas Holmes (brother); Charles Holmes; Sir Robert Holmes (grandfather); Sir John Holmes (uncle)
- Military career
- Allegiance: United Kingdom
- Branch: British Army
- Service years: 1721–1762
- Rank: Lieutenant (1723), Captain (1727), Major (1740), Lieutenant-Colonel (1743), Colonel (1746), Major-General (1756), Lieutenant-General (1759)
- Unit: 28th Foot
- Commands: 31st Foot

Henry Holmes (February 1703 – 11 August 1762) was a British army officer, Lieutenant-Governor of the Isle of Wight (1754–1762), and Member of Parliament (MP) for Newtown (1741–1747) and Yarmouth (1747–1762).

== Military career ==
The second son of Henry Holmes, a Member of Parliament and Lieutenant-Governor of the Isle of Wight, Holmes was commissioned as an ensign in the 28th Foot in 1721. He was promoted to lieutenant in 1723, captain in 1727, major in 1740, lieutenant colonel in 1743. It was in 1746 that he is said to have won the favour of the King. A military expedition was being planned, and it was widely believed that its destination was to be Canada. The King questioning the officers when they would be ready to embark, several of them asked for a few weeks leave of absence; but when the King turned to Holmes, he replied "Tomorrow, and whenever your Majesty should require my service." He was immediately promoted to Colonel in charge of a regiment of marines, and duly served in the planned action, although it turned out that it was only to be an assault on the coast of Brittany.

Holmes remained a favourite of George II. In 1749, he was appointed colonel of the 31st Foot, nicknamed the "Young Buffs". He was further promoted to major general in 1756 and lieutenant general in 1759.

== Political career ==
Holmes's older brother Thomas Holmes was the government's election manager on the Isle of Wight, eventually rewarded with an Irish peerage for his services and being allowed almost complete control over the nomination of MPs for five of the island's six Parliamentary seats. In 1741, Henry was elected at Thomas's instigation for Newtown; after one Parliament, he transferred to Yarmouth, which he represented for the rest of his life. He was also appointed Lieutenant-Governor of the Isle of Wight, in 1754. He died in 1762.

== Family ==
He had married Anne, the daughter of Nicholas Lysaght of Mountnorth, County Cork, but had no children. Holmes's younger brother, Charles Holmes, was also an Isle of Wight MP and a distinguished naval leader, third in command during Wolfe's capture of Quebec.

== Genealogy ==
- Henry Holmes of Mallow, County Cork, Ireland
  - Colonel Thomas Holmes of Kilmallock, County Limerick, Ireland
    - Henry Holmes (c. 1660–1738) m. Mary Holmes (daughter of Admiral Sir Robert Holmes)
      - Thomas Holmes, 1st Baron Holmes (1699–1764)
      - Lieutenant General Henry Holmes (1703–1762)
      - Rear Admiral Charles Holmes (1711–1761)
      - Elizabeth Holmes m. Thomas Troughear
        - Leonard (Troughear) Holmes, 1st Baron Holmes (c. 1732–1804) m. Elizabeth Tyrrell (d.1810)
          - The Hon. Elizabeth Holmes m. Edward Rushout
            - Descendants
  - Admiral Sir Robert Holmes (c. 1622–1692), English Admiral
    - Mary Holmes (wife of Henry Holmes)
  - Admiral Sir John Holmes (1640?–1683), English Admiral leader

Parliament of Great Britain
Preceded by Sir James Worsley, 5th Baronet; Thomas Holmes	Member of Parliament for Newtown (Isle of Wight); 1741–1747; With: Sir John Barrington	Succeeded by Sir John Barrington; Maurice Bocland
Preceded by Robert Carteret, 3rd Earl Granville; Maurice Bocland	Member of Parliament for Yarmouth (Isle of Wight); 1747–1762; With: Thomas Holmes	Succeeded by Thomas Holmes; Jeremiah Dyson
Honorary titles
Preceded by Charles Armand Powlett	Lieutenant-Governor of the Isle of Wight; 1754–1762	Succeeded by John Stanwix
