= Thomas Holmes, 1st Baron Holmes =

British politician and Vice-Admiral and Governor of the Isle of Wight (1699–1764)

The Right Honourable The Lord Holmes

Vice-Admiral and Governor of the Isle of Wight
- In office 1763–1764
- Monarch: George III
- Preceded by: The Earl of Portsmouth
- Succeeded by: Hans Stanley

Member of Parliament for Yarmouth
- In office 1747–1764 Serving with Henry Holmes; Jeremiah Dyson
- Monarchs: George II; George III
- Preceded by: Maurice Bocland; Robert Carteret
- Succeeded by: Jeremiah Dyson; John Eames

Member of Parliament for Newtown
- In office 1734–1741 Serving with James Worsley
- Monarch: George II
- Preceded by: Charles Armand Powlett; Sir John Barrington
- Succeeded by: Henry Holmes; Sir John Barrington
- In office 1727–1729 Serving with James Worsley
- Preceded by: William Stephens; Charles Worsley
- Succeeded by: Charles Armand Powlett; Sir John Barrington

Personal details
- Born: 2 November 1699
- Died: 21 July 1764 (aged 64)
- Party: Tory
- Spouse(s): (1) Anne Player Apsley (2) Catherine Leigh
- Parent(s): Henry Holmes; Mary Holmes
- Relatives: Henry Holmes (brother); Charles Holmes (brother); Sir Robert Holmes (grandfather); Sir John Holmes (uncle); Leonard Holmes (nephew)

Thomas Holmes, 1st Baron Holmes (2 November 1699 – 21 July 1764) was a British politician who was Vice-Admiral and Governor of the Isle of Wight (1763–4) and sat in the House of Commons between 1727 and 1774. He managed elections in the government interest in the Isle of Wight during the 1750s and 1760s.

== Early life ==
Holmes was baptized on 2 November 1699, the eldest son of Henry Holmes, MP, of Thorley, Yarmouth and his wife Mary, illegitimate daughter of Sir Robert Holmes, MP, of Thorley. He married Anne Apsley, widow of Colby Apsley, and daughter of Henry Player of Alverstone, Hampshire.

== Career ==
At the 1727 British general election Holmes was returned as a Tory Member of Parliament for Newtown, where his family shared the electoral influence with the Worsleys. He voted against the Administration on the civil list on 23 April 1729 but was unseated on petition on 25 April 1729. He was returned unopposed for Newtown at the 1734 British general election. He voted against the Administration on the Spanish convention in 1739 and was absent from the division on the place bill in 1740. In 1738, on the death of his father, he succeeded to his estates and political interests on the Isle of Wight. He did not stand at the 1741 British general election but returned his brother General Henry Holmes for Newtown instead.

Holmes then made an agreement with Sir Robert Walpole to support the Government on condition he should become the Government's manager for Newtown, Newport and Yarmouth, the three Isle of Wight boroughs. After the fall of Walpole in 1742, he renewed the agreement with Pelham. It was accepted that he should have first use of the seats for himself and his family and at the 1747 general election, he was returned unopposed with his brother Henry, for Yarmouth. He did not have as much power as many borough-owners who could directly return MPs, but he exercised his influence in favour of government candidates. He was returned again as MP for Yarmouth in 1754 and 1761. He returned his brother Admiral Charles Holmes for Newport in 1758.

Holmes was sufficiently valuable to the ministries of Pelham and Newcastle that he was able to ask for and receive secret service payments for each seat he secured. He was also given a peerage as Baron Holmes, of Kilmallock in the County of Limerick, on 11 September 1760. He was appointed Governor of the Isle of Wight from 6 April 1763.

== Family ==
Holmes first wife, Anne Player Apsley, died in 1743, and he married as his second wife Catherine Leigh, daughter of John Leigh of Shorwell, Isle.of Wight. He died in 1764 and was buried on 21 July. His only son by his first marriage predeceased him and the peerage became extinct on his death, but was revived in 1797 in favour of his nephew Leonard Holmes.

== Genealogy ==
- Henry Holmes of Mallow, County Cork, Ireland
  - Colonel Thomas Holmes of Kilmallock, County Limerick, Ireland
    - Henry Holmes (c. 1660–1738) m. Mary Holmes (daughter of Admiral Sir Robert Holmes)
      - Thomas Holmes, 1st Baron Holmes (1699–1764)
      - Lieutenant General Henry Holmes (1703–62)
      - Rear Admiral Charles Holmes (1711–1761)
      - Elizabeth Holmes m. Thomas Troughear
        - Leonard (Troughear) Holmes, 1st Baron Holmes (c. 1732–1804) m. Elizabeth Tyrrell (d.1810)
          - The Hon. Elizabeth Holmes m. Edward Rushout
            - Descendants
  - Admiral Sir Robert Holmes (c. 1622–1692), English Admiral
    - Mary Holmes (wife of Henry Holmes)
  - Admiral Sir John Holmes (1640?–1683), English Admiral leader

Parliament of Great Britain
Preceded by William Stephens; Charles Worsley	Member of Parliament for Newtown; 1727–1729; With: James Worsley	Succeeded by Charles Armand Powlett; Sir John Barrington
Preceded by Charles Armand Powlett; Sir John Barrington	Member of Parliament for Newtown; 1734–1741; With: James Worsley	Succeeded by Henry Holmes; Sir John Barrington
Preceded by Maurice Bocland; Robert Carteret	Member of Parliament for Yarmouth (Isle of Wight); 1747–1764; With: Henry Holmes 1747–1762; Jeremiah Dyson (1762–1764)	Succeeded by Jeremiah Dyson; John Eames
Honorary titles
Preceded by The Earl of Portsmouth	Vice-Admiral and Governor of the Isle of Wight; 1763–1764	Succeeded by Hans Stanley
Peerage of Ireland
New creation	Baron Holmes; 1760–1764	Extinct (revived in 1797 for Leonard Holmes)
