= John Burrard =

John Burrard (9 January 1646 – 14 May 1698) was MP for Lymington from 1679 to 1698.

Burrard was born at Lymington, the son of Thomas Burrard and Elizabeth née Isham. He was educated at the Middle Temple. In 1666 he married Elizabeth, daughter of John Button, MP: they had two sons and five daughters. She died in 1676 and he married secondly Alice, daughter of Richard Herbert, 2nd Baron Herbert of Chirbury.

Burrard was a Gentleman of the Privy Chamber from 1666 to 1685. He was made a Freeman of Lymington in 1667; and was Mayor from 1672 to 1673, and again from 1692 to 1695. He was Commissioner for Assessment for Hampshire from 1677 to 1680 and again from 1689 to 1690; and Commissioner of Wastes and Spoils for the New Forest in 1679. He was Ranger of the New Forest and Governor of Hurst Castle from 1689; and Lieutenant Colonel of Militia (Foot) from 1697.
