= Robert Crosse (MP) =

English politician

Robert Crosse (died 1611), was an English politician.

Crosse was a member (MP) of the Parliament of England for Minehead in 1586, Yarmouth, Isle of Wight in 1593 and Saltash in 1601.

After the Union of the Crowns in 1603, many courtiers travelled to Northamptonshire at this time to greet the queen and her children, seeking royal favour. Lord Buckhurst wrote on 21 June 1603 that he and the Lord Keeper Thomas Egerton were travelling "to do our duties to the Queen, the Prince, and Princess, all the world flying beforehand to see her". Robert Crosse complained that Elizabeth Raleigh had persuaded him to make an "idle journey" to meet the queen and she had received "but idle graces".
