= John Holmes (Royal Navy officer) =

British Royal Navy officer (1640?–1683)

Admiral Sir John Holmes

Governor of Hurst Castle
- In office 1675–1683
- Monarch: Charles II
- Preceded by: Edward Strange
- Succeeded by: Henry Holmes

Member of Parliament for Newtown, Isle of Wight
- In office 1677–1685 Serving with John Churchill; Lemuel Kingdon; Daniel Finch
- Monarch: Charles II
- Preceded by: Sir John Barrington; Sir Robert Worsley
- Succeeded by: Thomas Done; William Blathwayt

Personal details
- Born: 1640
- Died: 28 May 1683 (aged 42–43)
- Parent: Henry Holmes
- Relatives: Sir Robert Holmes (brother); Henry Holmes (nephew)
- Military career
- Allegiance: England
- Branch: Royal Navy
- Service years: 1663–1683
- Rank: Admiral
- Commands: HMS Paul; HMS Bristol; HMS Triumph; HMS Gloucester; HMS Rupert
- Conflicts: Battle of Lowestoft; St James's Day Battle; Battle of Solebay; First Battle of Schooneveld

Admiral Sir John Holmes (1640? – 28 May 1683) was an English naval leader who rose to be Commander-in-Chief of the fleet in the English Channel (1677–79) and was the younger brother of the more famous Admiral Sir Robert Holmes.

== Military career ==
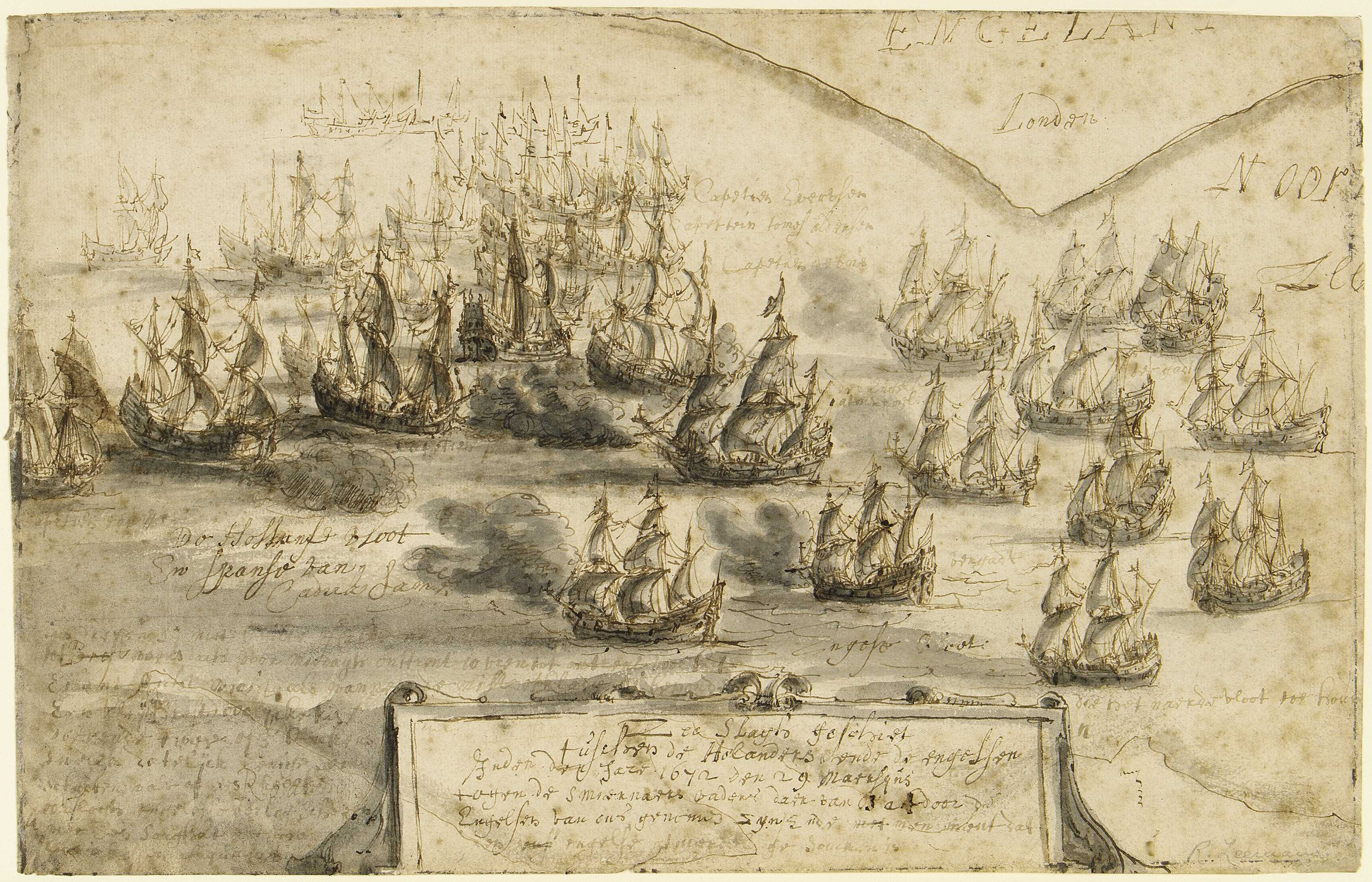
The attack on the Smyrna Fleet, 12 March 1672

Holmes served in his brother's expedition to West Africa in 1663–1664. At the Battle of Lowestoft in 1665, and until June the following year, he commanded the Paul.

He also fought in the St James's Day Battle, as captain of the 48-gun Bristol. He was then promoted to command of a second-rate, Triumph, of 64 guns. In 1670-1 he was in Vice Admiral Sir Edward Spragge's expedition against the corsairs of Algiers.

He commanded the Gloucester (62 guns) in the attack on the Dutch Smyrna fleet in 1672, which opened the Third Anglo-Dutch War, capturing one of the Dutch ships though it sank almost immediately because of damage inflicted in the fight. He was wounded, and following this action, knighted, and appointed to command the 66-gun HMS Rupert, in which he fought at the Battle of Solebay in 1672, and a number of the battles of the following year.

At the First Battle of Schooneveld he was mentioned in dispatches. In 1673 he was promoted to flag rank, and in 1677–1679 was Commander-in-Chief of the fleet in the English Channel.

== Political career ==
Holmes's brother, Sir Robert Holmes, had been appointed Governor of the Isle of Wight, and was willing to use the influence this gave him on his brother's behalf. In 1675, Sir John was appointed Governor of Hurst Castle, and from 1677 to 1685 was Member of Parliament for Newtown, Isle of Wight.

== Genealogy ==
- Henry Holmes of Mallow, County Cork, Ireland
  - Colonel Thomas Holmes of Kilmallock, County Limerick, Ireland
    - Henry Holmes (c. 1660–1738) m. Mary Holmes (daughter of Admiral Sir Robert Holmes)
      - Thomas Holmes, 1st Baron Holmes (1699–1764)
      - Lieutenant General Henry Holmes (1703–62)
      - Rear Admiral Charles Holmes (1711–1761)
      - Elizabeth Holmes m. Thomas Troughear
        - Leonard (Troughear) Holmes, 1st Baron Holmes (c. 1732–1804) m. Elizabeth Tyrrell (d.1810)
          - The Hon. Elizabeth Holmes m. Edward Rushout
            - Descendants
  - Admiral Sir Robert Holmes (c. 1622–1692), English Admiral
    - Mary Holmes (wife of Henry Holmes)
  - Admiral Sir John Holmes (1640?–1683), English Admiral leader

Parliament of England
Preceded by Sir John Barrington; Sir Robert Worsley	Member of Parliament for Newtown (Isle of Wight); 1677–1685; With: Sir John Barrington 1677–1679; John Churchill 1679; Lemuel Kingdon 1679–1681; Daniel Finch 1681–1685	Succeeded by Thomas Done; William Blathwayt
Honorary titles
Preceded by Edward Strange	Governor of Hurst Castle; 1675–1683	Succeeded by Henry Holmes
