= Maurice Bocland (British Army officer) =

British soldier and Member of Parliament

Lieutenant-General Maurice Bocland (c. 1695 – 15 August 1765) of Knighton Gorges in the parish of Newchurch, Isle of Wight, was a British soldier and Member of Parliament.

== Biography ==
He was the second son of Maurice Bocland (1648–1710) of Standlynch, by his wife Mabel Dillington, daughter and (in her issue) heiress of Sir Robert Dillington, 2nd Baronet of Knighton Gorges. He was commissioned as a cornet in the 5th Dragoon Guards in 1715, and was promoted to lieutenant in 1716 and captain-lieutenant in the 1st Dragoon Guards in 1719.

Bocland succeeded to the family estate in Wiltshire on the death of his brother Philip, but sold it in 1726 and moved to Hampshire. He was first elected to Parliament for Yarmouth at a by-election in 1733, then for Lymington at the general election in 1734, for Yarmouth again in 1741, and for Newport in 1747. In Parliament he supported the Government.

In his military career, Bocland transferred from the cavalry to the infantry in 1738, when he was promoted to captain in the 1st Regiment of Foot Guards, ranking as a lieutenant-colonel. He served in the War of the Austrian Succession in Flanders from 1743 to 1746; he was wounded at the Battle of Fontenoy in 1745 and promoted to major in the same year. In 1747 he was made colonel of the 11th Regiment of Foot, an appointment he would hold until his death.

Knighton Gorges Manor, 1781

Bocland succeeded his maternal aunt to the estate of Knighton in 1749, and was made Captain of Carisbrooke Castle in 1752. He was not elected to Parliament in the general election of 1754, but continued his advance in the Army with promotion to major-general in 1755 and lieutenant-general in 1758.

By his first wife, Jane Fox (d. 25 February 1741), Bocland had five sons and two daughters. He married secondly on 4 November 1741, Sophia Bisset, a daughter of Major Bisset of Southampton, without issue. Knighton Gorges passed to his grandson Maurice George Bisset (1757–1821) the son of his daughter Jane Bockland by her husband Rev. Alexander Bissett (the son of Major William Bisset, the second son of Alexander Bisset, 13th feudal baron of Lessendrum, Aberdeen, Scotland).

Parliament of Great Britain
Preceded by Maurice Morgan; Paul Burrard	Member of Parliament for Yarmouth; 1733–1734; With: Paul Burrard	Succeeded by Paul Burrard; Lord Harry Powlett
Preceded by Lord Nassau Powlett; William Powlett	Member of Parliament for Lymington; 1734–1741; With: Sir John Cope	Succeeded by Lord Nassau Powlett; Harry Burrard
Preceded by Thomas Gibson; Anthony Chute	Member of Parliament for Yarmouth; 1741–1747; With: Thomas Gibson 1741–1744; Robert Carteret 1744–1747	Succeeded by Thomas Holmes; Henry Holmes
Preceded by Henry Holmes; Sir John Barrington	Member of Parliament for Newtown; 1747–1754; With: Sir John Barrington	Succeeded by Sir John Barrington; Harcourt Powell
Military offices
Preceded by William Graham	Colonel of the 11th Regiment of Foot; 1747–1765	Succeeded by William A'Court Ashe
