= Sir John Barrington, 9th Baronet =

British politician

Sir John Barrington, 9th Baronet (8 December 1752 – 5 August 1818) was a British politician who sat in the House of Commons from 1780 to 1796.

Born at Red Lion Street in London and baptised at St Andrew, Holborn, Barrington was the eldest son of Sir Fitzwilliam Barrington, 8th Baronet and his wife Jane Hall, daughter of Matthew Hall. He was educated at Eton College from 1761 to 1770 and entered Trinity Hall, Cambridge in 1771. In 1792, he succeeded his father as baronet.

Barrington entered Parliament at the 1780 general election, sitting as a member of parliament (MP) for Newtown, the same constituency his uncle John had before represented. He was re-elected in 1784 and 1790. He decided not to stand at the 1796 general election.

Barrington died unmarried aged 66 at his seat Barrington Hall, Essex on 5 August 1818. and was buried at St Mary the Virgin, Hatfield Broadoak. He was succeeded in the baronetcy by his younger brother Fitzwilliam.

Parliament of Great Britain
Preceded by Edward Meux Worsley; Charles Ambler	Member of Parliament for Newtown; 1780 – 1796; With: Edward Meux Worsley 1780–1782; Henry Dundas 1782–1783; Richard Pepper Arden 1783–1784; James Worsley 1784; Mark Gregory 1784–1790; Sir Richard Worsley 1790–1793; George Canning 1793–1796	Succeeded by Sir Richard Worsley; Charles Shaw Lefevre
Baronetage of England
Preceded by Fitzwilliam Barrington	Baronet (of Barrington Hall); 1792–1818	Succeeded by Fitzwilliam Barrington
