= Joseph André Cellony =

French painter

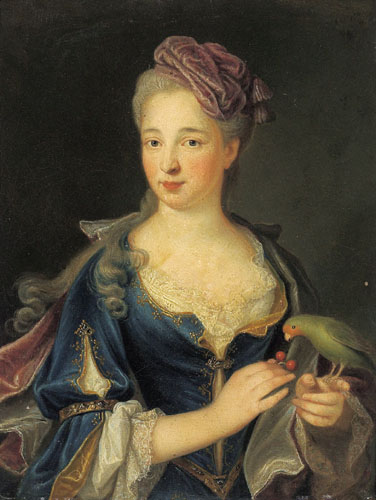
- Portrait of Madame de Chateaurenard by Cellony
- Born: Cellony; 1696; Aix-en-Provence, Province of Provence, France
- Died: 7 February 1746 (aged 49–50); Aix-en-Provence, Provence, France
- Known for: painting
- Movement: Classicism

Joseph André Cellony (1686, in Aix-en-Provence – 7 February 1746, in Aix-en-Provence) was a French painter.

== Life ==
He was the only son of another painter renowned in Aix-en-Provence, Joseph Cellony (1663, Aix-en-Provence - 18 January 1731, Aix-en-Provence), who had been born to Pierre and Delphine Tassy. In 1692 Joseph senior was called "the most distinguished portraitist there is in this town. The resemblance that so great that one could not mistake the correction of his drawing and the bold touch of his brush in the manner of Fauchier, thus granting him his celebrity." After gaining the rudiments of painting in his father's studio, Joseph André was very soon sent to the studio of Hyacinthe Rigaud in Paris to perfect himself "in the art that his father strove at, who he excelled". "His touch was very soft and the fabrics and especially silks he painted imitated nature better by the transparency and glaze he used there."

In 1716, the town undertook the decoration of the grande salle which housed the town's council. Joseph Etienne de Meyran-Lacetta, marquis de Lagoy then first consul, commissioned both Cellonys (father and son) and Vialy to paint portraits of the counts of Provence and their successors the kings of France. However, plague hit the town in 1720 and 1721 and the project was only finished in 1726. Cellony "le fils" therefore seems, by the finesse of his technique, to have been a major player in the portrait art of 18th century Provence.

In 1724, when Rigaud produced a vast portrait of the marquis de Gueidan in his costume as president of the parlement of Provence, there were many negotiations over adaptations to be made to the original idea. The marquis's cousin Etienne de Lieutaud tempered marquis's impatience to receive his portrait and mentioned Cellony as his intermediary of choice to draw the painting as it then was:

Finally, he worked all Saturday for you and all today; I have been there since the morning until nine pm and you can see that there have been considerable changes made and that it is one of the most beautiful pieces he has made and ever will make in his life; here you have set camp and the latter is infinitely superior.

Remember on this that I have the honour of writing to you and that you shall find I do not at all exaggerate; but I no longer hesitate to announce to you the departure from such a rare piece, for as it is a new pose, he wants to keep the blue paper drawing as those which he showed you : it will be the son of Selony who draws it, but he will then retouch it and it is impossible to refuse this completion to such a clever man and one who wants to put himself to new pains, he would not have been any other.

Joseph André Cellony died in Aix-en-Provence in 1746, in the flower of his age, leaving three sons, one of whom was a distinguished painter in another genre, Joseph II Cellony (1 February 1730, Aix - ?).
