= Anthony Langley Swymmer =

English MP

Anthony Langley Swymmer (1724–1760) was an 18th-century English MP. He sat for Southampton from 1747 to 1754.

Swymmer was born and died in Jamaica. He was the only son of Anthony Swymmer of St. Thomas-in-the-East. He was educated at Winchester and Peterhouse. He married Arabella, daughter of Sir John Astley, 2nd Baronet.
