= Harcourt Powell =

British politician

Harcourt Powell (1718–1782) was a British politician who sat in the House of Commons between 1754 and 1775.

Powell was the son of Thomas Powell of the Six Clerks office, and his wife Anne Harcourt, daughter of Sir Philip Harcourt. He was admitted at Lincoln's Inn in 1736. He married Beata Parker, daughter of Rev. Hyde Parker, granddaughter of Sir Henry Parker, 2nd Baronet.

The Powell family came from Pembrokeshire and held the manor of Uggaton near Brighstone. They acquired three burgages in Newtown, Isle of Wight. In the 1754 general election Powell was returned unopposed as Member of Parliament for Newtown (Isle of Wight) and was returned unopposed again in 1761. In parliament he was an independent country gentleman. In 1768 he had to fight a contested election at Newtown, standing jointly with Sir John Barrington against Sir Thomas Worsley and John Glynn. He was returned unopposed again in 1774, but on 21 March 1775 he accepted 4,000 guineas to vacate his seat in Parliament and convey his three burgages at Newtown to Sir Richard Worsley. There is no record of Powell having spoken during his 21 years in the Commons.

Powell died on 26 February 1782.

== Sources ==
Parliament of Great Britain
Preceded by Sir John Barrington; Maurice Bocland	Member of Parliament for Newtown (Isle of Wight); 1754–1775; With: Sir John Barrington	Succeeded by Sir John Barrington; Charles Ambler
