= French ship Lys =

Nine ships of the French Navy have borne the name Lys after the Lilium, a flower featured in the arms of France as the Fleur-de-lis:

- Lys (1667), a 54-gun ship of the line, renamed Assuré in 1671.
- Lys (1671), a 70-gun ship of the line
- Lys (1691), a Sceptre-class 84-gun ship of the line
- Lys (1706), a 70-gun ship of the line
- Lys (1746), a 64-gun ship of the line, lead ship of her class
- Lys (1780), a corvette, captured by the Royal Navy the year of her launching.
- Lys (1786), a Téméraire-class 74-gun ship of the line. She was started as Commerce de Marseille, and also bore the name Tricolore from 1792
- Polonais (1808), a Téméraire-class 74-gun ship of the line, became Lys in 1814 at the Bourbon Restoration
- Ulm (1854), a 90-gun ship of the line, was started as Lys in 1825, was renamed Ulm in 1830 after the July Revolution, and completed as a steam ship in 1854.
