= Sir John Barrington, 7th Baronet =

British politician

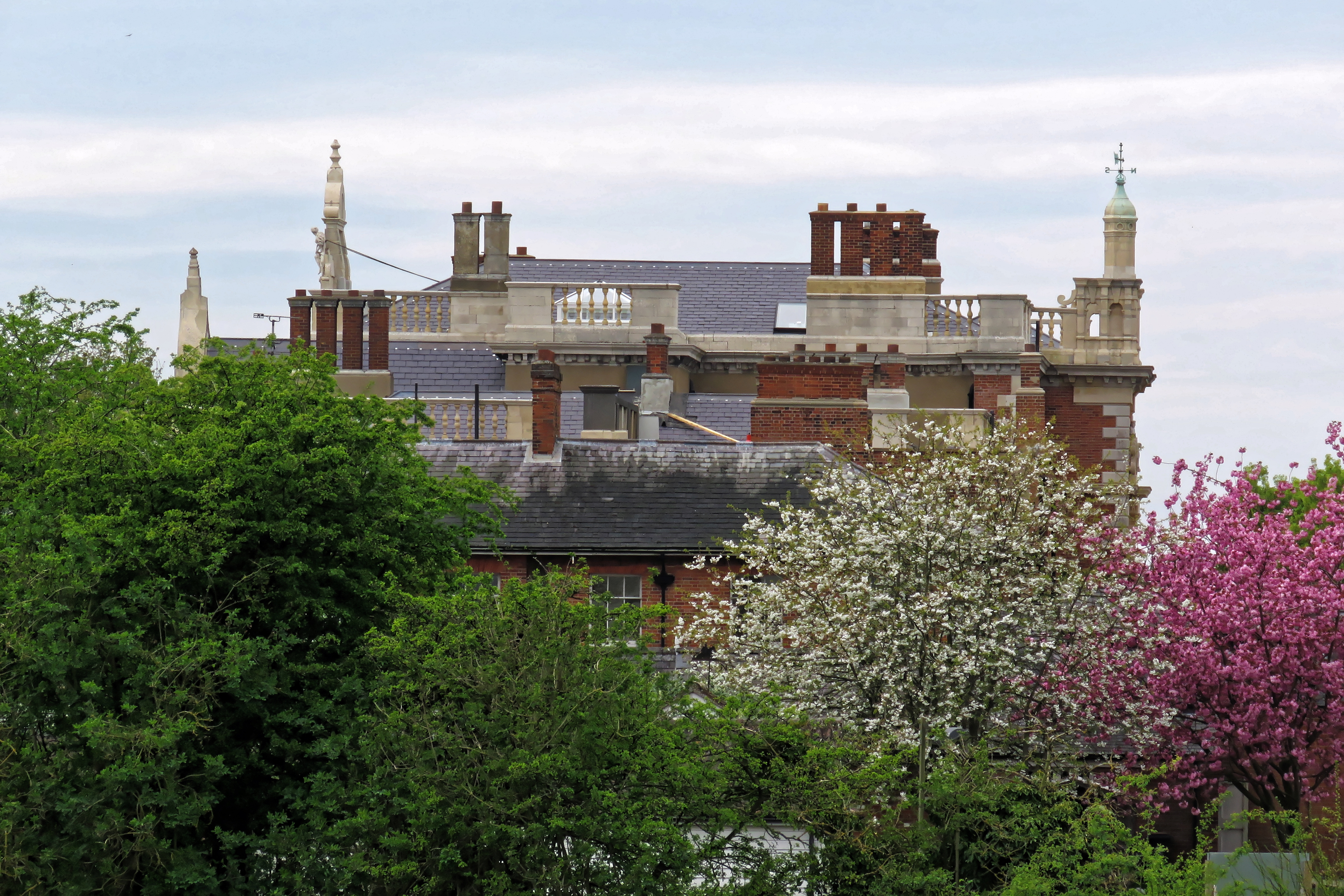
Barrington Hall

Sir John Barrington, 7th Baronet (c. 1707– 4 May 1776) of Barrington Hall, Essex was a British politician who sat in the House of Commons for a total of 36 years between 1729 and 1775. Barrington was the elder son of Sir John Barrington, 6th Baronet and his wife Susan Draper, daughter of George Draper. He succeeded his father as baronet in August 1717. He married Mary Roberts, daughter of Patricius Roberts.

The Barrington family owned an electoral interest (the Swainston estate) at Newtown (Isle of Wight) where there were fewer than 40 voters. In the 1727 general election Barrington stood for Parliament at Newtown with government support and was initially defeated, but was returned on petition on 25 April 1729 as Member of Parliament. He did not stand in the 1734 general election but was returned unopposed at Newtown in 1741 and 1747. He was returned unopposed again in 1754 and 1761. In the 1768 general election there was a contest and he was successful taking 20 votes to his opponent's 15. He was unopposed again in 1774 but vacated his seat a year later in November 1775.

Barrington died childless on 4 May 1776 and was buried at Lilley, Hertfordshire. He was succeeded in the baronetcy by his younger brother Fitzwilliam Barrington.

Parliament of Great Britain
| Preceded by James Worsley; Thomas Holmes | Member of Parliament for Newtown; 1729–1734; With: Charles Armand Powlett | Succeeded by James Worsley; Thomas Holmes |
| Preceded by James Worsley; Thomas Holmes | Member of Parliament for Newtown; 1741–1775; With: Henry Holmes 1741–1747; Maurice Bocland 1747–1754; Harcourt Powell 1754–1775; Charles Ambler 1775 | Succeeded by Edward Meux Worsley; Charles Ambler |
Baronetage of England
| Preceded by John Barrington | Baronet (of Barrington Hall); 1717–1776 | Succeeded by FitzWilliam Barrington |
