= List of governors of the Isle of Wight =

Below is a list of those who have held the office of Governor of the Isle of Wight in England. Lord Mottistone was the last lord lieutenant to hold the title governor, from 1992 to 1995; since then there has been no governor appointed.

== Governors of the Isle of Wight ==
- 1509–1520: Sir Nicholas Wadham (1472-1542) of Merryfield and Edge, "Captain of the Isle of Wight".
- 1520–1538: Sir James Worsley
- 1538–1540: Thomas Cromwell, 1st Baron Cromwell (later Earl of Essex)
- 1540–1553: Richard Worsley
- 1553–1558: Sir William Girling
- 1558–1560: William Paulet, 1st Marquess of Winchester
- 1560–1565: Richard Worsley (reappointed)
- 1565–1583: Sir Edward Horsey
- 1583–1603: George Carey, 2nd Baron Hunsdon
- 1603–1624: Henry Wriothesley, 3rd Earl of Southampton
- 1633–1642: Jerome Weston, 2nd Earl of Portland
- 1642–1647: Philip Herbert, 4th Earl of Pembroke
- 1647–1647: Robert Hammond
- 1648–1659: William Sydenham
- 1660: Anthony Ashley Cooper, 1st Earl of Shaftesbury
- 1660–1661: Jerome Weston, 2nd Earl of Portland
- 1661–1667: Thomas Colepeper, 2nd Baron Colepeper
- 1668–1692: Sir Robert Holmes
- 1693: Thomas Tollemache
- 1693–1707: John Cutts, 1st Baron Cutts
- 1707–1710: Charles Paulet, 2nd Duke of Bolton
- 1710–1715: John Richmond Webb
- 1715–1726: William Cadogan (later Earl Cadogan)
- 1726–1733: Charles Paulet, 3rd Duke of Bolton
- 1733–1734: John Montagu, 2nd Duke of Montagu
- 1734–1742: John Wallop, 1st Viscount Lymington
- 1742–1746: Charles Paulet, 3rd Duke of Bolton
- 1746–1762: John Wallop, 1st Earl of Portsmouth
- 1763–1764: Thomas Holmes, 1st Baron Holmes
- 1764–1766: Hans Stanley
- 1766–1770: Harry Paulet, 6th Duke of Bolton
- 1770–1780: Hans Stanley
- 1780–1782: Sir Richard Worsley, 7th Baronet
- 1782–1791: Harry Paulet, 6th Duke of Bolton
- 1791–1807: Thomas Orde-Powlett, 1st Baron Bolton
- 1807–1841: James Harris, 2nd Earl of Malmesbury
- 1841–1857: William à Court, 1st Baron Heytesbury
- 1857–1888: Charles Shaw-Lefevre, 1st Viscount Eversley
- 1889–1896: Prince Henry of Battenberg
- 1896–1944: Princess Beatrice of the United Kingdom
- 1957–1965: Gerald Wellesley, 7th Duke of Wellington
- 1965–1974: Louis Mountbatten, 1st Earl Mountbatten of Burma (Lord Lieutenant 1974–1979)
- 1992–1995: David Seely, 4th Baron Mottistone

== Lieutenant-governors of the Isle of Wight ==
- c.1689–1693: William Stephens
- 1694–1701: Joseph Dudley
- 1702–1710: Anthony Morgan
- 1710–1714: Henry Holmes
- 1715–1729: Anthony Morgan
- 1731–1733: Maurice Morgan
- 1733–1751: Charles Armand Powlett
- 1754–1762: Henry Holmes
- 1763–1766: John Stanwix
- ?1766–1768: John Mompesson
- 1768–1795: William Howe, 5th Viscount Howe
- 1795–1798: Sir Ralph Abercrombie
- 1798–1808: Sir William Medows
- 1808–1812: Francis Edward Gwyn
- 1812–1815: Charles Leigh
- 1815–1839: Mervyn Archdall

== Deputy Governors ==
- 1899–1910: Thomas Belhaven Henry Cochrane
- 1910–1913: Francis John Stuart Hay-Newton
- 1913–1928: Hallam Tennyson, 2nd Baron Tennyson

== See also ==
- Isle of Wight
- Lord Lieutenant of the Isle of Wight
