= Thomas Wyndham (of Tale) =

English politician

Sir Thomas Wyndham (c. 1628 – May 1713) was an English politician. He sat in the House of Commons of England from 1673 to 1679 as a Member of Parliament (MP) for Minehead, then from 1679 to 1689 for Yarmouth (Isle of Wight).

He was the oldest son of Sir Edmund Wyndham of Tale, Devon and the brother of Sir Charles Wyndham and Hugh Wyndham. He married his cousin Elizabeth Warne after 1650, and following her death in 1671, Winifred Welles.
