= Charles Armand Powlett =

British Army general

Major-General Sir Charles Armand Powlett, KB (c. 1694 – 14 November 1751), of Leadwell (now Ledwell), Oxfordshire, was a British Army officer and Whig politician who sat in the House of Commons between 1729 and 1751.

Powlett was the younger son of Lord William Powlett, brother of the second Duke of Bolton, by his wife Louisa, daughter of Armand Nompar de Caumont, Marquis de Montpouillon, and granddaughter of Henri Nompar de Caumont, 3rd Duc de La Force. He joined the Army, rising to the rank of Lieutenant-Colonel and was appointed Lieutenant-Governor of the Isle of Wight from 1733 to his death.

Powlett stood for Newtown at the 1727 British general election and after losing in the poll was returned as Member of Parliament on petition on 25 April 1729. At the 1734 British general election he was defeated at St Ives. He was returned as MP for Christchurch at a by election on 3 April 1740, and on 27 December of that year he became Colonel of a newly raised regiment of Marines, which took his name and was later ranked as the 52nd Regiment of Foot. He was returned unopposed for Christchurch in 1741 and 1747. His regiment was disbanded on 7 November 1748. On 2 May 1749 Powlett was made a Knight Companion of the Order of the Bath, and on 1 November he was appointed Colonel of what had been George Reade's Regiment, later the 9th Regiment of Foot. On 26 January 1751 he became Colonel of the 13th Dragoons, a post he held until his death later that year. His second cousin once removed, Captain Harry Powlett, was elected for Christchurch in his place.

In June 1738 he had married Elizabeth, daughter of Thomas Lewes of Stanford in Nottinghamshire and widow of Richard Dashwood, third son of Sir Robert Dashwood, 1st Baronet and a former High Sheriff of Norfolk; they had no children. Sir Charles Powlett was survived by Lady Powlett, who died in September 1756, by his stepson Robert Dashwood, and by his step-grandson Charles Vere Dashwood, of Stanford, who was later to name his eldest son Charles Armand Dashwood.

Military offices
New regiment	Colonel of Charles Powlett's Regiment of Marines; 1740–1748	Regiment disbanded
Preceded by George Reade	Colonel of Sir Charles Powlett's Regiment of Foot; 1749–1751	Succeeded by The Earl Waldegrave
Preceded by Peter Naison	Colonel of the 13th Regiment of Dragoons; 1751	Succeeded by Hon. Henry Seymour Conway
Parliament of Great Britain
Preceded by James Worsley; Thomas Holmes	Member of Parliament for Newtown; 1729–1734; With: Sir John Barrington, Bt	Succeeded by James Worsley; Thomas Holmes
Preceded by Joseph Hinxman; Edward Hooper	Member of Parliament for Christchurch; 1740–1751; With: Edward Hooper 1740–1748; Sir Thomas Robinson 1748–1751	Succeeded by Sir Thomas Robinson; Harry Powlett
