= Worsley baronets of Appuldurcombe (1611) =

Extinct English baronetcy

Arms of Worsley of Appuldurcombe

The Worsley baronetcy, of Appuldurcombe in the County of Hampshire, was created in the Baronetage of England on 29 June 1611 for the landowner and politician Richard Worsley.

On the death of the 4th Baronet, the title passed to a branch of the family living at Pylewell, near Lymington, Hampshire. All except the 6th and 8th Baronets were Members of Parliament for Newport, Isle of Wight, as were other members of the family including Henry Worsley. The 7th Baronet was succeeded in his estates by his niece who married the 1st Earl of Yarborough, with the title passing to a distant kinsman. It became extinct on the death of his son, 9th Baronet, in 1825.

In 1833, Elizabeth Holmes, the daughter and heiress of the 9th Baronet, married William à Court, the heir of William à Court, 1st Baron Heytesbury. At the same time he assumed by royal licence the additional surname of Holmes after that of à Court. In 1860 he changed the family name, by royal licence, from à Court-Holmes to Holmes-à Court.

Before succeeding as 2nd Baron Heytesbury, William à Court-Holmes was member of parliament for the Isle of Wight from 1837 to 1847, and his grandson William Holmes à Court, 3rd Baron Heytesbury, still had an estate at Newport, Isle of Wight, when he died in 1903.

== Worsley baronets, of Appuldurcombe (1611) ==
- Sir Richard Worsley, 1st Baronet (1588–1621)
- Sir Henry Worsley, 2nd Baronet (1613–1666)
- Sir Robert Worsley, 3rd Baronet (1643–1675)
- Sir Robert Worsley, 4th Baronet (1669–1747)
- Sir James Worsley, 5th Baronet (1672–1756)
- Sir Thomas Worsley, 6th Baronet (1728–1768)
- Sir Richard Worsley, 7th Baronet (1751–1805)
- Sir Henry Worsley-Holmes, 8th Baronet (1756–1811)
- Sir Leonard Thomas Worsley-Holmes, 9th Baronet (1787–1825)

=== Title succession chart ===
Title succession chart, Worsley baronets, of Appuldurcombe

Sir Richard Worsley; 1st Baronet; 1588–1621
Sir Henry Worsley; 2nd Baronet; 1613–1666	Unknown son	Thomas Worsley
Sir Robert Worsley; 3rd Baronet; 1643–1675	Sir James Worsley ?–1695	George Worsley
Sir Robert Worsley; 4th Baronet; 1669–1747	Sir James Worsley; 5th Baronet; 1672–1756	Rev. John Worsley
Sir Thomas Worsley; 6th Baronet; 1728–1768	Thomas Worsley
Sir Richard Worsley; 7th Baronet; 1751–1805	Sir Henry Worsley-Holmes; 8th Baronet ?–1811
Robert Worsley; 1776–1795	Sir Leonard Worsley-Holmes; 9th Baronet; 1787–1825	Richard Worsley-Holmes; 1792–1814
Baronetcy extinct

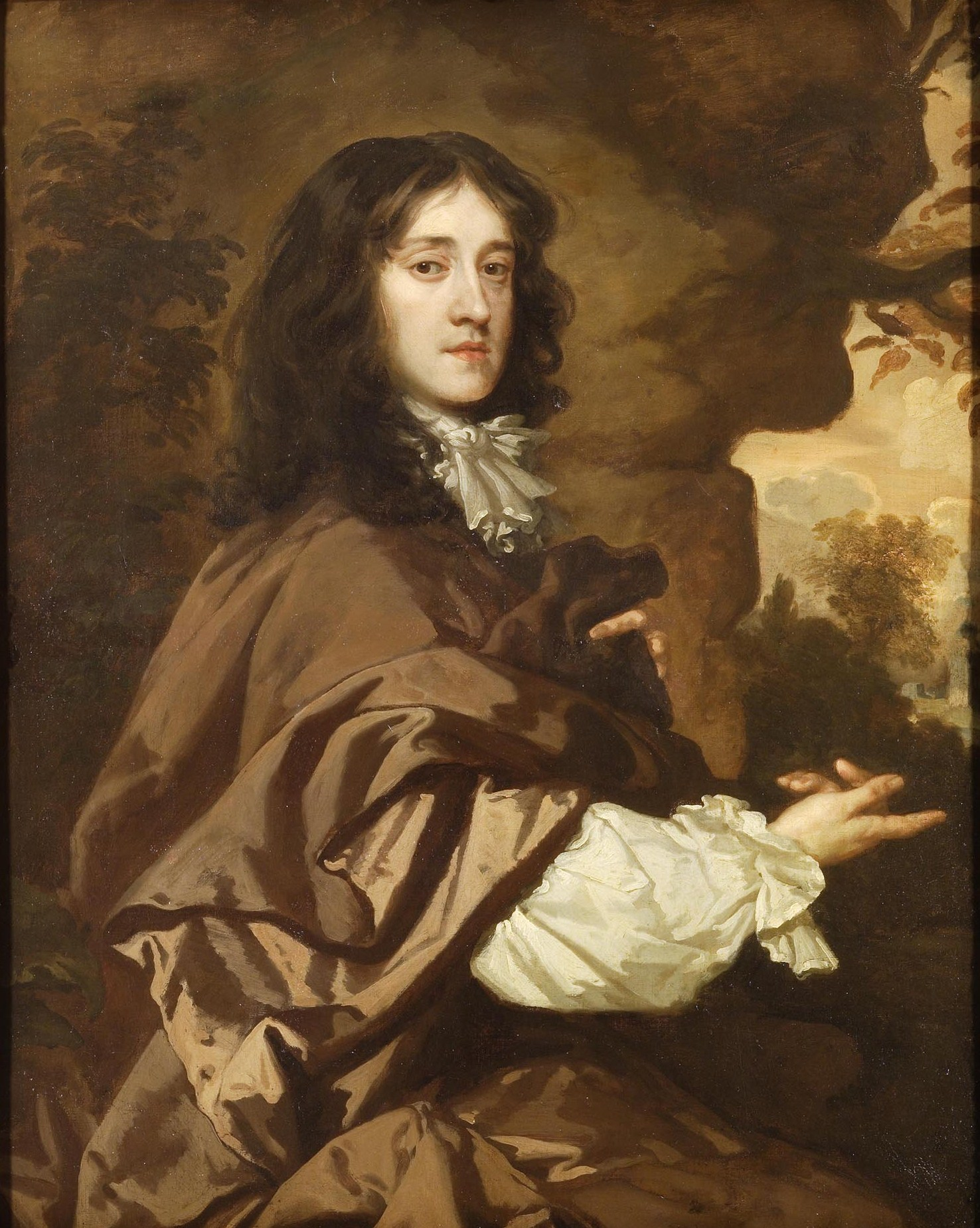
Sir Robert Worsley, 3rd Baronet, painted by Sir Peter Lely

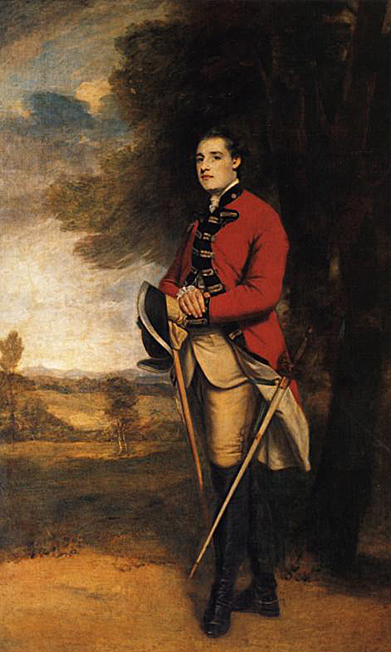
Sir Richard Worsley, 7th Baronet

== Notes ==
Baronetage of England
Preceded by Throckmorton baronets	Worsley baronets of Appuldurcombe; 29 June 1611	Succeeded by Fleetwood baronets
