= John Spencer, 1st Earl Spencer =

British peer and politician (1734–1783)

The Right Honourable The Earl Spencer
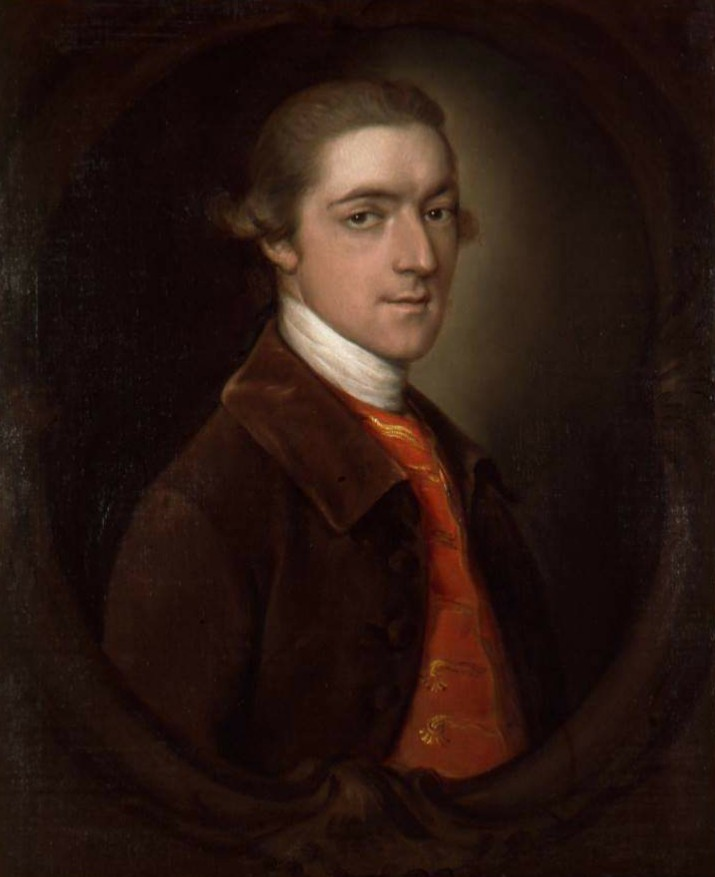
- The Earl Spencer, by Thomas Gainsborough

Member of Parliament for Warwick
- In office 1756–1761 Serving with Henry Archer
- Preceded by: Henry Archer; Wills Hill
- Succeeded by: Henry Archer; Hamilton Boyle, Viscount Dungarvan

Personal details
- Born: John Spencer; 19 December 1734 Althorp, Northamptonshire
- Died: 31 October 1783 (aged 48) Bath, Somerset
- Party: Whig
- Spouse: Georgiana Poyntz (m. 1755)
- Children: Georgiana Cavendish, Duchess of Devonshire; George John Spencer, 2nd Earl Spencer; Henrietta Ponsonby, Countess of Bessborough
- Parents: Hon. John Spencer (father); Georgiana Carteret (mother)

John Spencer, 1st Earl Spencer (19 December 1734 – 31 October 1783), styled Viscount Spencer from 1761–65, was a British peer and politician.

== Early life ==
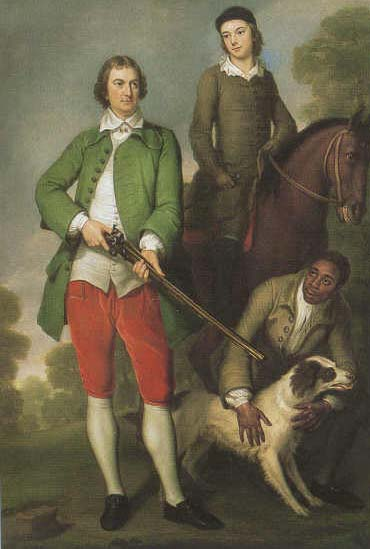
Portrait of Spencer and his father, by George Knapton, c. 1744

Spencer was born on 19 December 1734 at Althorp, his family's home in Northamptonshire. He was the only son of the Hon. John Spencer and the former Georgiana Caroline Carteret. His only sibling was his sister, Diana Spencer, who died at 8 years old. After his father's alcohol-related death in 1746, his mother married, secondly, William Clavering-Cowper, 2nd Earl Cowper.

His father was the youngest son of Charles Spencer, 3rd Earl of Sunderland, the First Lord of the Treasury and Lord President of the Council under George I, and his second wife, Lady Anne Churchill (third daughter of the 1st Duke of Marlborough), who served as Lady of the Bedchamber to Queen Anne. Among his paternal family were uncle Robert Spencer, 4th Earl of Sunderland, aunt Lady Anne Spencer (wife of 1st Viscount Bateman), Charles Spencer, 5th Earl of Sunderland (who succeeded his great-aunt, Henrietta, becoming the 3rd Duke of Marlborough), and aunt Lady Diana Spencer (wife of the 4th Duke of Bedford).

His mother was the third daughter and heiress of Lord President of the Council John Carteret, 2nd Earl Granville, and his first wife, Frances Worsley (daughter of Sir Robert Worsley, 4th Baronet). Among his maternal family were aunts Louisa Carteret (wife of the 2nd Viscount Weymouth), Grace Carteret (wife of the 4th Earl of Dysart), Frances Carteret (wife of the 4th Marquess of Tweeddale), and Sophia Carteret (wife of the 1st Marquess of Lansdowne).

Spencer was the principal beneficiary under the will of his great-grandmother Sarah, Duchess of Marlborough who stipulated, however, that should he at any time accept "from any King or Queen of these realms any pension, or any office or employment, civil or military" (except the Rangership of Windsor Great or Little Park), the estate would pass to the next heir "as if the same John Spencer were actually dead."

== Career ==
After going on a Grand Tour, Spencer returned to England where, in 1754, he was too young to stand for Parliament, but in return for James Grimston's election at St Albans, the Grimston family promised to support for him, or his nominee, on the next occasion. In March 1756 Spencer, standing on the Whig interest, but lost in the exceedingly expensive by-election at Bristol where Jarrit Smyth was elected. Nevertheless, Spencer was returned on 9 December for Warwick, mainly on the interest of Lord Brooke (later the 1st Earl of Warwick). Spencer represented Warwick alongside Henry Archer. On 27 November 1760, Spencer wrote to the Duke of Newcastle, the prime minister of Great Britain, stating:

"As I am the representative of the Sunderland family, and as my particular circumstances are such (from the Duchess of Marlborough's will) that I cannot receive any favour from the King except a title, I should hope that if his Majesty thinks me worthy of a peerage he will not confer upon me a less dignity than that of a viscount... I hope your Grace has observed that ever since I sat in Parliament I have never failed in supporting the King and his ministers to the best of my ability."

Newcastle replied that the King had received the application, but that there would be no immediate creations. Therefore, he continued canvassing St Albans but toward the end of February 1761, he nominated Viscount Nuneham in his place, likely after being informed of his impending creation. On 3 April 1761, he was created Baron Spencer of Althorp and Viscount Spencer by King George III.

Spencer went into Opposition with Newcastle in 1762, and when the Rockingham Government was being formed, Newcastle noted in his lists: "Viscount Spencer to be created an earl" which happened when he was created Viscount Althorp and Earl Spencer on 1 November 1765. Next, he adhered to the Chatham Administration. Lord Spencer later served as High Steward of St Albans in 1772 and Mayor of St Albans in 1779.

== Personal life ==
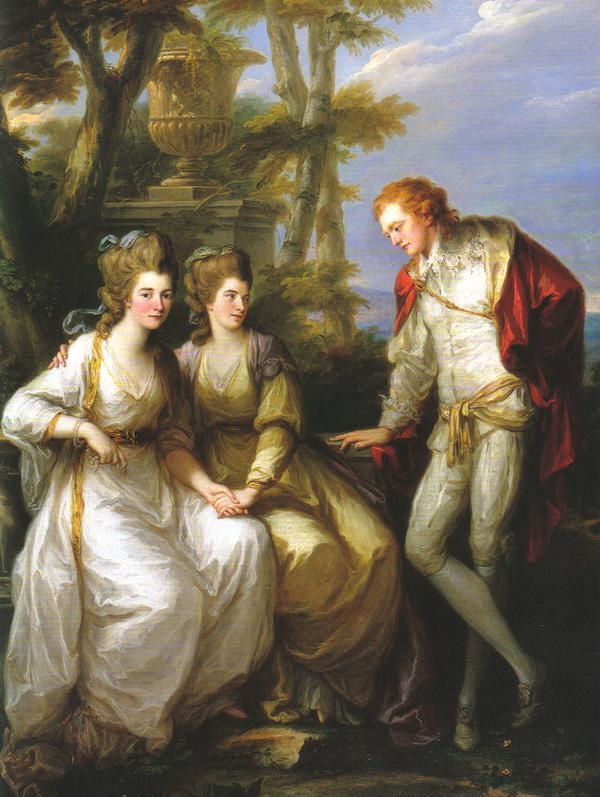
Portrait of Lord Spencer's three surviving children, Georgiana, George and Henrietta, by Angelica Kauffman, 1774

In 1754, the 20-year-old Spencer met 17-year-old Margaret Georgiana Poyntz, who was the daughter of the English diplomat and courtier Stephen Poyntz. They were instantly attracted to one another, but Spencer was uncertain if he would have his family's approval for the match and opted to spend several months travelling until his 21st birthday, when their approval would no longer be necessary. On his return, they recognised their love had persisted, and shortly after his birthday, they married in a secret ceremony on 20 December 1755 at Althorp, the Spencer family seat in Northamptonshire. The ceremony, held in an upper bedroom, occurred during a ball held in Spencer's honour with five hundred guests in attendance. They had five children, three of whom survived infancy:

- Lady Georgiana Spencer (1757–1806), who married William Cavendish, 5th Duke of Devonshire.
- George John Spencer, 2nd Earl Spencer (1758–1834), who married Lady Lavinia Bingham, daughter of Charles Bingham, 1st Earl of Lucan.
- Lady Henrietta Frances Spencer (1761–1821), who married Frederick Ponsonby, 3rd Earl of Bessborough.
- Lady Charlotte Spencer (1765–1766), who died in infancy.
- Lady Louisa Spencer (1769–1769), who died in infancy.

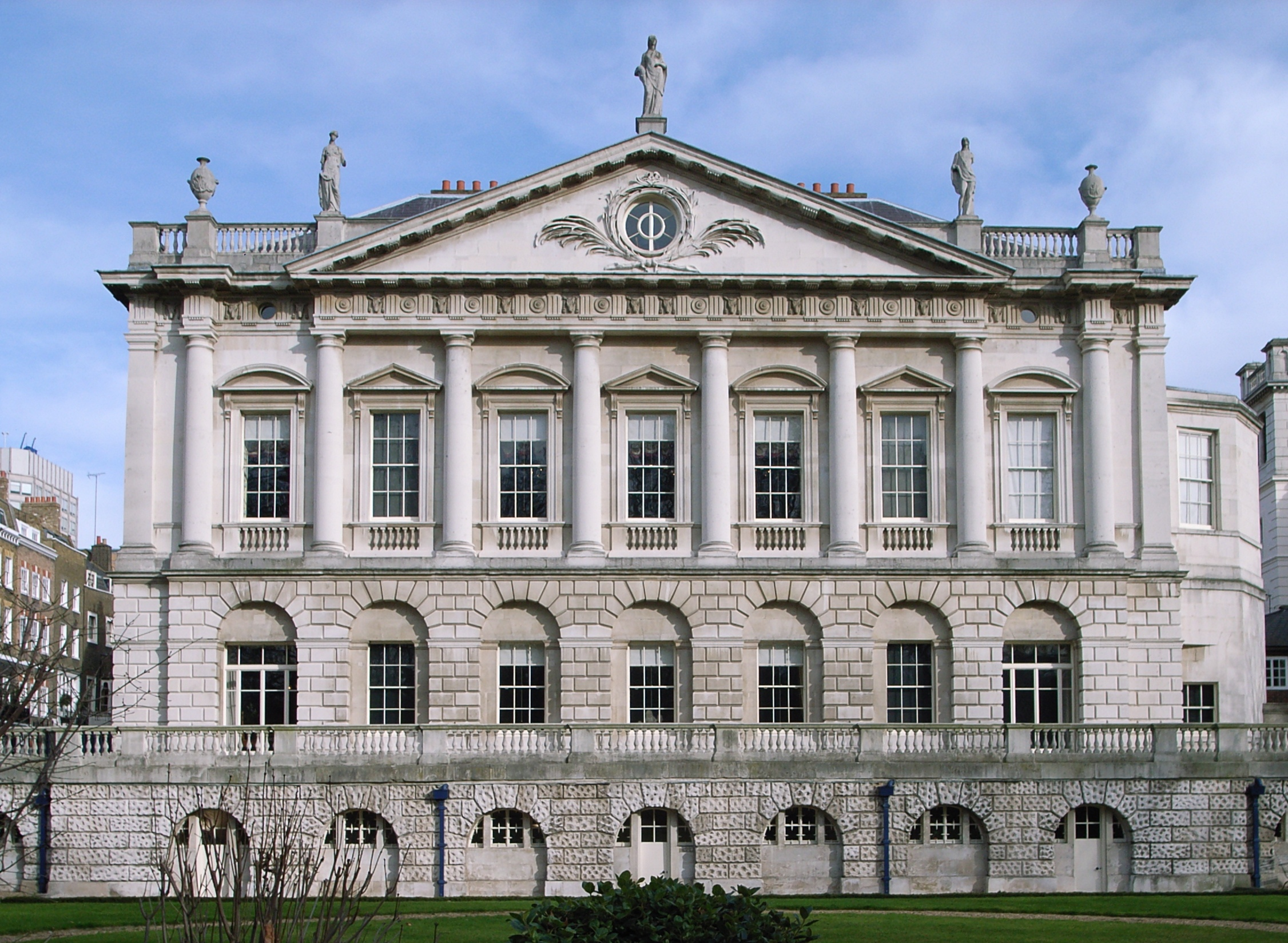
Spencer House (1752––1754) by John Vardy. Spencer House was the home of the Earls of Spencer until 1895. This is the view from Green Park.

The Spencers owned many estates, but preferred to reside at Althorp. In 1764, the family moved to their newly built London residence, Spencer House. Intended to be worthy of Spencer's large collection of antiquities, the lavish residence took seven years and £50,000 to build.

Spencer died aged 48 on 31 October 1783 near Bath. He had suffered from a long illness. He was buried in the family vault at St Mary's Church, Great Brington in Northamptonshire. His widow lived another 30 years before her death on 18 March 1814.

== Coat of arms ==
Coat of arms of John Spencer, 1st Earl Spencer
Coronet A Coronet of an Earl Crest Out of a Ducal Coronet Or a Griffin's Head Azure gorged with a Bar Gemelle Gules between two Wings expanded of the second Escutcheon Quarterly Argent and Gules in the 2nd and 3rd quarters a Fret Or over all on a Bend Sable three Escallops of the first Supporters Dexter: A Griffin per fess Ermine and Erminois gorged with a Collar Sable the edges flory-counterflory and chained of the last and on the Collar three Escallops Argent; Sinister: A Wyvern Erect on his tail Ermine similarly collared and chained Motto Dieu Defend Le Droit (God defend the right)

Parliament of Great Britain
Preceded by Henry Archer; Wills Hill	Member of Parliament for Warwick; 1756–1761; With: Henry Archer	Succeeded by Henry Archer; Viscount Dungarvan
Peerage of Great Britain
New creation	Earl Spencer; 1765–1783	Succeeded by George Spencer
New creation	Viscount Spencer; 1761–1783	Succeeded by George Spencer
