= John Carteret, 2nd Earl Granville =

British statesman (1690–1763)

The Right Honourable The Earl Granville KG PC
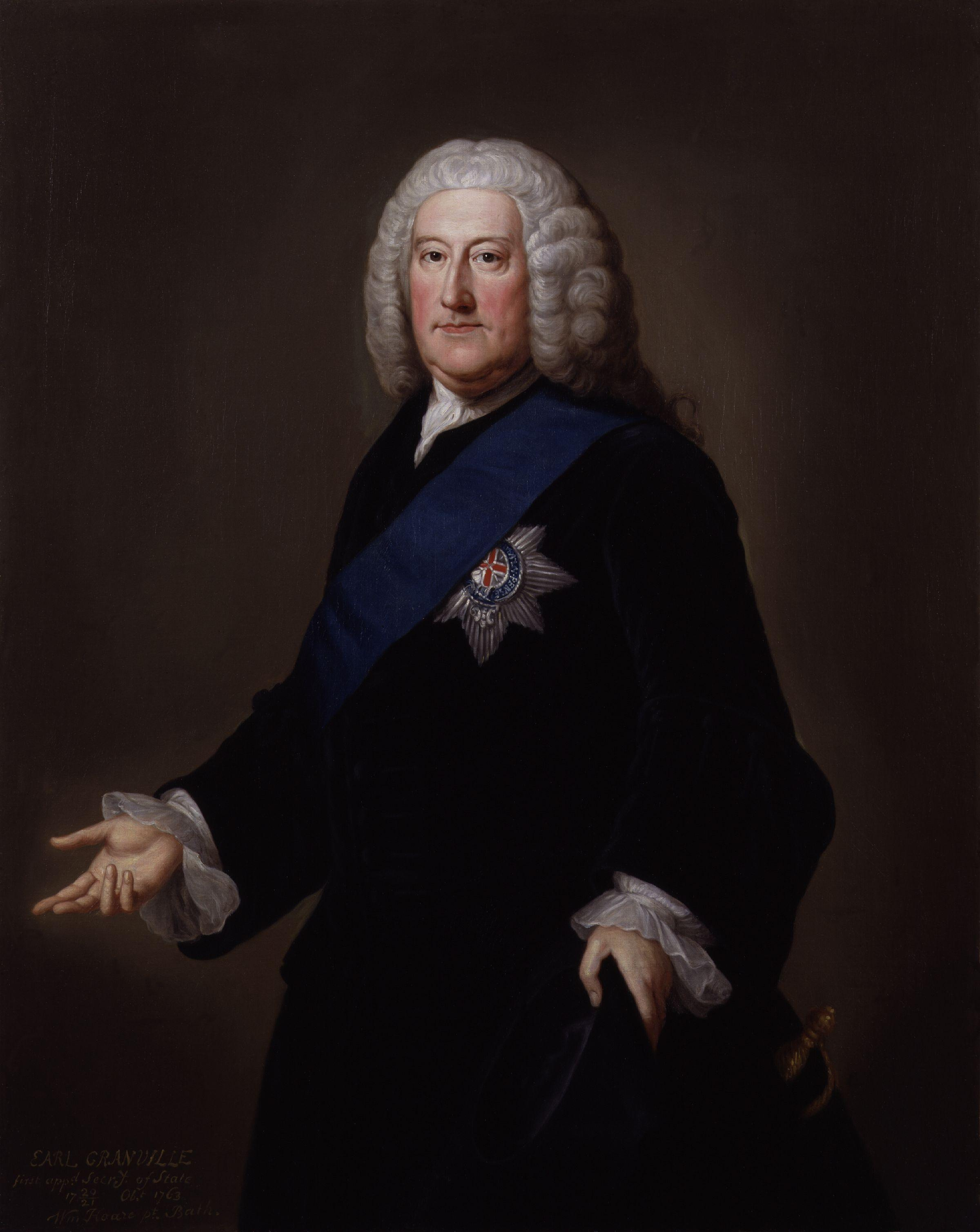
- Portrait by William Hoare, c. 1750–1752

Lord President of the Council
- In office 17 June 1751 – 2 January 1763
- Monarchs: George II; George III
- Prime Minister: Henry Pelham; The Duke of Newcastle; The Duke of Devonshire; The Duke of Newcastle; The Earl of Bute
- Preceded by: The Duke of Dorset
- Succeeded by: The Duke of Bedford

Secretary of State for the Northern Department
- Disputed; 10 February 1746 – 12 February 1746
- Monarch: George II
- Prime Minister: The Earl of Bath
- Preceded by: The Earl of Harrington
- Succeeded by: The Earl of Harrington
- In office 12 February 1742 – 24 November 1744
- Monarch: George II
- Prime Minister: The Earl of Wilmington; Henry Pelham
- Preceded by: The Lord Harrington
- Succeeded by: The Earl of Harrington

Lord Lieutenant of Ireland
- In office 6 May 1724 – 23 June 1730
- Monarchs: George I; George II
- Prime Minister: Robert Walpole
- Preceded by: The Duke of Grafton
- Succeeded by: The Duke of Dorset

Secretary of State for the Southern Department
- In office 4 March 1721 – 31 March 1724
- Monarch: George I
- Prime Minister: Robert Walpole
- Preceded by: James Craggs the Younger
- Succeeded by: The Duke of Newcastle

Personal details
- Born: John Carteret; 22 April 1690 Westminster, Middlesex, England
- Died: 2 January 1763 (aged 72) Westminster, Middlesex, Great Britain
- Party: Whig
- Spouses: Frances Worsley (m. 1710; died 1743) Sophia Fermor (m. 1744; died 1745)
- Children: 8, including Louisa, Georgiana, and Robert
- Education: Christ Church, Oxford

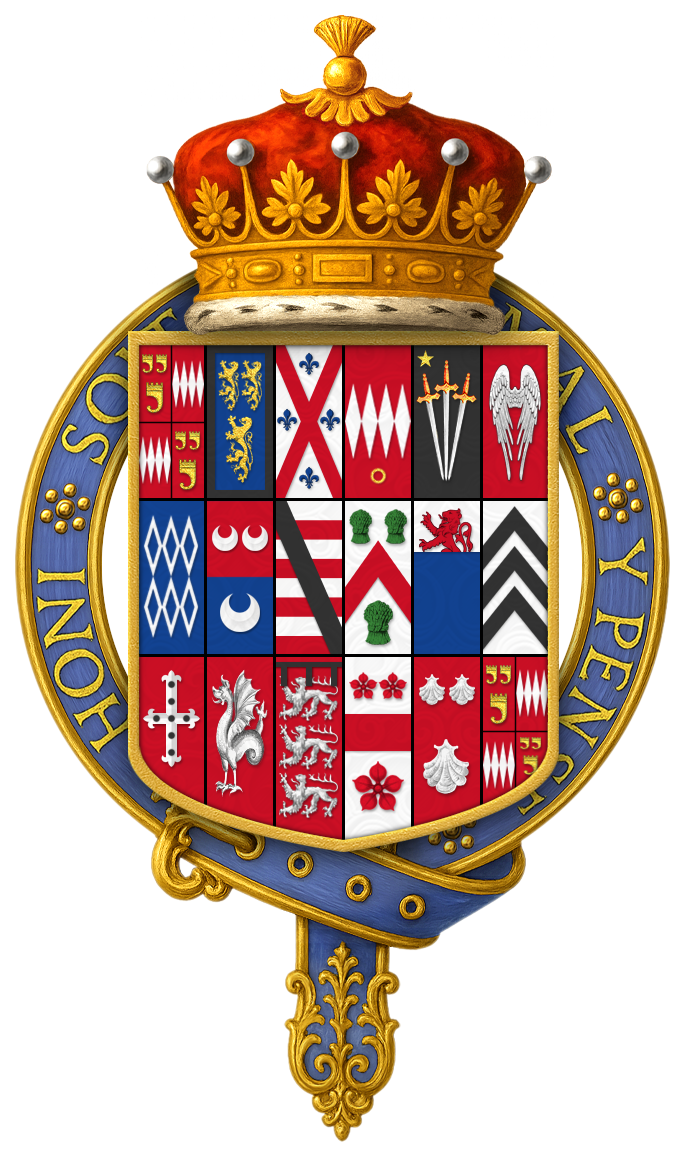
Quartered arms of John Carteret, 2nd Earl Granville, KG

John Carteret, 2nd Earl Granville, 7th Seigneur of Sark (/kɑːrtəˈrɛt/; 22 April 1690 – 2 January 1763), commonly known by his earlier title Lord Carteret, was a British statesman and Lord President of the Council from 1751 to 1763 and worked closely with the Prime Minister of the country, Spencer Compton, Earl of Wilmington, to manage the various factions of the Government. He was Seigneur of Sark from 1715 to 1720, when he sold the fief. He held (in absentia) the office of Bailiff of Jersey from 1715 to 1763.

== Origins ==
He was the son and heir of George Carteret, 1st Baron Carteret (1667–1695) by his wife, Lady Grace Granville (c. 1677–1744), suo jure 1st Countess Granville, 3rd daughter of John Granville, 1st Earl of Bath (1628–1701) of Stowe House in the parish of Kilkhampton in Cornwall. The progeny of the marriage, Barons Carteret, Earls Granville, and Marquesses of Bath (Thynne), were co-heirs to her childless nephew William Granville, 3rd Earl of Bath (1692–1711). The family of Carteret was settled in the Channel Islands and was of Norman descent.

== Early life ==
John Carteret was educated at Westminster School, and at Christ Church, Oxford. Jonathan Swift said that "with a singularity scarce to be justified he carried away more Greek, Latin and philosophy than properly became a person of his rank". Throughout his life, Carteret showed not only a keen love of the classics, but also a taste for and knowledge of modern languages and literature. He was almost the only English nobleman of his time who spoke German, which allowed him to talk with and gain the trust of King George I, who spoke little English. Walter Harte, the author of the Life of Gustavus Adolphus, acknowledged the aid that Carteret had given him.

On 17 October 1710 at Longleat House, Carteret married Frances Worsley, daughter of Sir Robert Worsley, 4th Baronet and Frances Thynne, Lady Worsley. She was the granddaughter of the 1st Viscount Weymouth. One of their daughters, Georgiana Caroline Carteret Spencer, became the grandmother of Georgiana, Duchess of Devonshire.

Upon reaching his majority of 21, Lord Carteret took his seat in the House of Lords on 25 May 1711. Although his family, on both sides, had been devoted to the Jacobite cause, Carteret was a steady adherent of the Hanoverian dynasty that supplanted it. He was a friend of the Whig leaders Stanhope and Charles Spencer, 3rd Earl of Sunderland, and supported the passing of the Septennial Act.

== Diplomat ==
Carteret's interests were in foreign, not domestic, policy. His serious work in public life began with his appointment, early in 1719, as Ambassador to Sweden. During this and the following year he was employed in saving Sweden from the attacks of Peter the Great, and in arranging the pacification of the north. His efforts were finally successful.

During this period of diplomatic work he acquired an exceptional knowledge of the affairs of Europe, and in particular of Germany, and displayed great tact and temper in dealing with the Swedish Riksdag, Ulrike Eleonora of Sweden, Frederick IV of Denmark and Friedrich Wilhelm I of Prussia. However, he was not qualified to hold his own in the intrigues of Court and Parliament in London. Appointed as Secretary of State for the Southern Department on his return home, he soon came into conflict with the intrigues of Townshend and Sir Robert Walpole.

== Rivalry with Walpole ==
To Walpole, who looked upon every able colleague or subordinate as an enemy to be removed, Carteret was exceptionally odious. His capacity to speak German with the King would alone have made Sir Robert detest him. When, therefore, the violent agitation in Ireland against Wood's halfpence made it necessary to replace the Duke of Grafton as Lord Lieutenant, Carteret was sent to Dublin, where he landed on 23 October 1724. Trinity College, Dublin, awarded him an Honorary LLD in 1725.

In the first months of his tenure of office, he had to deal with the furious opposition to Wood's halfpence and to counteract the effect of Swift's Drapier's Letters. Carteret had a strong personal liking for Swift, who was also a friend of his wife's family. It is highly doubtful that Carteret could have reconciled his duty to the crown with his private friendships if the government had persisted in endeavouring to force the detested coinage on the Irish people. Wood's patent was, however, withdrawn, and Ireland settled down. Carteret was a profuse and popular Lord Lieutenant, who pleased both the British interest and the native Irish. He was at all times addicted to lavish hospitality and, according to the testimony of contemporaries, was "too fond of burgundy". He remained in post until 1730.

== Americas ==
Carteret had inherited a one-eighth share in the Province of Carolina through his great-grandfather Sir George Carteret. In 1727 and 1728 John learned that the owners of the remaining shares were planning to sell them back to the crown. Carteret declined to join them. In 1729, the others surrendered their claims, but in 1730, Carteret, to keep ownership of his stake, agreed to give up any participation in government.

Carteret's share was later defined as a 60-mile wide strip of land in North Carolina adjoining the Virginia boundary, and became known as the Granville District. The lands of the Granville District remained a possession of the Carteret family until the death of Carteret's son Robert in 1776. After the American War of Independence, Robert's heirs were compensated in part by the Crown for the loss of the lands.

== Queen Caroline ==
When Carteret returned to London in 1730, Walpole was firmly in charge of the House of Commons and as the trusted Minister of King George II. Walpole also had the full confidence of Queen Caroline, whom he prejudiced against Carteret. Until the fall of Walpole in 1742, Carteret could take no share in public affairs except as a leader of opposition in the House of Lords. His brilliant parts were somewhat obscured by his rather erratic conduct and a certain contempt, partly aristocratic and partly intellectual, for commonplace men and ways. He endeavoured to please Queen Caroline, who loved literature, and he has the credit of having paid the expenses of the first handsome edition of Don Quixote to please her. He also involved himself in the establishment of the Foundling Hospital, a charity championed by the Queen, for which he became a founding governor. However, he reluctantly and most unwisely allowed himself to be entangled in the scandalous family quarrel between Frederick, Prince of Wales, and his parents. Queen Caroline was provoked into classing Carteret and Bolingbroke as "the two most worthless men of parts in the country".

== Secretary of State ==
Carteret took the popular side in the outcry against Walpole for not declaring war on Spain. When the War of the Austrian Succession approached, his sympathies were entirely with Maria Theresa of Austria, mainly on the ground that the fall of the house of Austria would dangerously increase the power of France even if she gained no accession of territory. Those views made him welcome to George II, who gladly accepted him as Secretary of State in 1742. In 1743, he accompanied the King to Germany and was present at the Battle of Dettingen on 27 June 1743. Carteret held the secretary-ship until November 1744.

Carteret succeeded in promoting an agreement between Maria Theresa and Frederick II of Prussia. He understood the relations of the European states and the interests of Great Britain among them, but the defects that had rendered him unable to baffle the intrigues of Walpole made him equally unable to contend with the Pelhams (Henry Pelham and his elder brother Thomas Pelham-Holles, 1st Duke of Newcastle, successive Prime Ministers). Carteret's support of the King's policy was denounced as subservience to Hanover. William Pitt called him "an execrable, a sole minister, who had renounced the British nation". A few years later, Pitt adopted an identical policy and professed that whatever he knew he had learnt from Carteret.

== Earl Granville ==
On 18 October 1744 Carteret became 2nd Earl Granville on the death of his mother. His first wife, Lady Frances Worsley, died on 20 June 1743 at Hanover, and in April 1744, he married Lady Sophia Fermor, a daughter of Thomas Fermor, 1st Earl of Pomfret and a fashionable beauty and "reigning toast" of London society who was younger than his daughters. Granville's ostentatious performance of the part of lover was ridiculed by Horace Walpole as "The nuptials of our great Quixote and the fair Sophia" and "My lord stayed with her there till four in the morning. They are all fondness—walk together, and stop every five steps to kiss".

The Countess Granville died on 7 October 1745, leaving one daughter, Sophia Carteret, who married William Petty, 2nd Earl of Shelburne, later 1st Marquess of Lansdowne. Granville's second marriage may have done something to increase his reputation for eccentricity. In February 1746, he allowed himself to be entrapped by the intrigues of the Pelhams into accepting the secretaryship but resigned within forty-eight hours. In June 1751, he became president of the council and was still liked and trusted by the King, but his share in government did not go beyond giving advice and endeavouring to forward ministerial arrangements. In 1756, he was asked by Newcastle to become Prime Minister as the alternative to Pitt, but he perfectly understood why the offer was made and so he declined and supported Pitt. When, in October 1761, Pitt, who had information of the signing of the "Family Compact", wished to declare war on Spain and declared his intention to resign unless his advice was accepted, Granville replied that "the opinion of the majority (of the Cabinet) must decide". He spoke in complimentary terms of Pitt but resisted his claim to be considered as a "sole minister" or Prime Minister.

Whether he used the words that were attributed to him in the Annual Register for 1761 is more than doubtful, but the minutes of Council show that they express his meaning.

== Marriages and issue ==
Carteret married twice, firstly to Frances Worsley (1694–1743), daughter of Sir Robert Worsley, 4th Baronet and Hon. Frances Thynne, by whom he had three sons and five daughters:

- Lady Grace Carteret (8 July 1713 – 23 July 1755), who married Lionel Tollemache, 4th Earl of Dysart, and had issue.
- Hon. Louisa Carteret (1714–1736), married Thomas Thynne, 2nd Viscount Weymouth of Longleat in Wiltshire, and was the ancestress of the Marquesses of Bath (created 1789) and Barons Carteret (of the second creation 1784)
- Lady Georgiana Caroline Carteret (1715–1780), who married firstly John Spencer MP, and was the mother of John Spencer, 1st Earl Spencer; she married secondly William Clavering-Cowper, 2nd Earl Cowper
- Hon. George Carteret (14 February 1716 – June 1721), died young
- Hon. Frances, died in infancy
- Lady Frances Carteret (6 April 1718 – 25 December 1788), married in 1748 John Hay, 4th Marquess of Tweeddale
- Hon. John Carteret (9 October 1719 – 1735), died young
- Robert Carteret, 3rd Earl Granville (1721–1776), eldest surviving son and heir

Secondly, in 1744, he married Lady Sophia Fermor (29 May 1721 – 7 October 1745), daughter of Thomas Fermor, 1st Earl of Pomfret. She died the following year of a fever, several months following the birth of their only daughter:

- Lady Sophia Carteret (26 August 1745 – 5 January 1771), who married William Petty, 1st Marquess of Lansdowne, and had issue.

== Death and burial ==
He remained in office as President of the Privy Council until his death on 2 January 1763. His last act was to listen on his deathbed to the reading of the preliminaries of the Treaty of Paris by the Under-Secretary to the Secretary of State, Robert Wood, author of an essay on The Original Genius and Writings of Homer, who would have postponed the business, but Granville said that it "could not prolong his life to neglect his duty" and quoted in ancient Greek the speech of Sarpedon from the Iliad xii. 322–328, repeating the last word ἴομεν ("iomen") (the first word of verse 328) meaning "let us go forward". Wood recalled the event as follows:

"However, in the course of that active period, the duties of my situation engaged me in an occasional attendance upon a nobleman, who, while he presided at his Majesty's councils, reserved some moments for literary amusement. His Lordship was very partial to this subject; and I seldom had the honour of receiving his commands on business, that he did not lead the conversation to Greece and Homer. Being directed to wait upon his Lordship, a few days before he died, with the preliminary articles of the Treaty of Paris, I found him so languid, that I proposed postponing my business for another time: but he insisted that I should stay, saying, it could not prolong his life, to neglect his duty; and repeating the following passage, out of Sarpedon's speech, he dwelled with particular emphasis on the third line, which recalled to his mind the distinguishing part, he had taken in public affairs. His Lordship repeated the last word several times with a calm and determinate resignation: and after a serious pause of some minutes, he desired to hear the Treaty read; to which he listened with great attention: and recovered spirits enough to declare the approbation of a dying Statesman (I use his own words) on the most glorious War, and most honourable Peace, this nation ever saw."

He died in his house in Arlington Street, London, on 2 January 1763. His remains were interred at Westminster Abbey.

== Succession ==
The title of Earl Granville descended to his son Robert, who died without issue in 1776, when the earldom of this creation became extinct.

== Legacy ==
Two North Carolina counties were named for Lord Carteret, Carteret County (established 1722) and Granville County (1746). During the 17th and 18th centuries, the area which is now South Carolina used the names Carteret and Granville for a few of its counties.

Namesakes of Granville Street in Vancouver, British Columbia; Granville, Massachusetts; Granville, New York; Granville Centre, Nova Scotia and Granville Ferry, as well as Carteret and Granville Streets in Halifax. Translator George Sale dedicated his Alcoran of Mohammed to Granville.

Lord John Carteret was played by Anton Lesser, as depicted in the 2011 film Pirates of the Caribbean: On Stranger Tides.

== See also ==
- Quia Emptores

== Bibliography ==
- Ballantyne, Archibald. Lord Carteret: A Political Biography 1690 to 1763 (1887) online
- Coxe, William, Memoirs of the administration of the Right Honourable Henry Pelham, collected from the family papers, and other authentic documents (2 vol. 1829) online
- Marshall, Dorothy. Eighteenth Century England (2nd ed. 1974) political history 1714–1784,
- Nichols, R.H. and F A. Wray, The History of the Foundling Hospital (London: Oxford University Press, 1935).
- Wilkes, John William. A Whig in power: the political career of Henry Pelham (Northwestern University Press, 1964).
- Williams, Basil. Carteret and Newcastle (reprint . Cambridge University Press, 2014)
- Williams, Basil. The Whig Supremacy: 1714–1760 (2nd ed. 1962).

Political offices
| Preceded by James Craggs | Southern Secretary; 1721–1724 | Succeeded by The Duke of Newcastle |
| Preceded by The Duke of Grafton | Lord Lieutenant of Ireland; 1724–1730 | Succeeded by The Duke of Dorset |
| Preceded by The Lord Harrington | Northern Secretary; 1742–1744 | Succeeded by The Earl of Harrington |
| Preceded by The Duke of Dorset | Lord President of the Council; 1751–1763 | Succeeded by The Duke of Bedford |
Honorary titles
| Preceded by Sir William Courtenay, Bt | Lord Lieutenant of Devon; 1716–1721 | Succeeded by The Lord Clinton |
Peerage of Great Britain
| Preceded by Grace Carteret | Earl Granville; 1st creation 1744–1763 | Succeeded by Robert Carteret |
Peerage of England
| Preceded by George Carteret | Baron Carteret; 1st creation 1695–1763 | Succeeded by Robert Carteret |
| Preceded by Charles de Carteret | Seigneur of Sark; 1715–1720 | Succeeded by John Johnson |
