= Frances Carteret, Lady Carteret =

Vicereine of Ireland (1694 – 1743)

The Right Honourable The Baroness Carteret
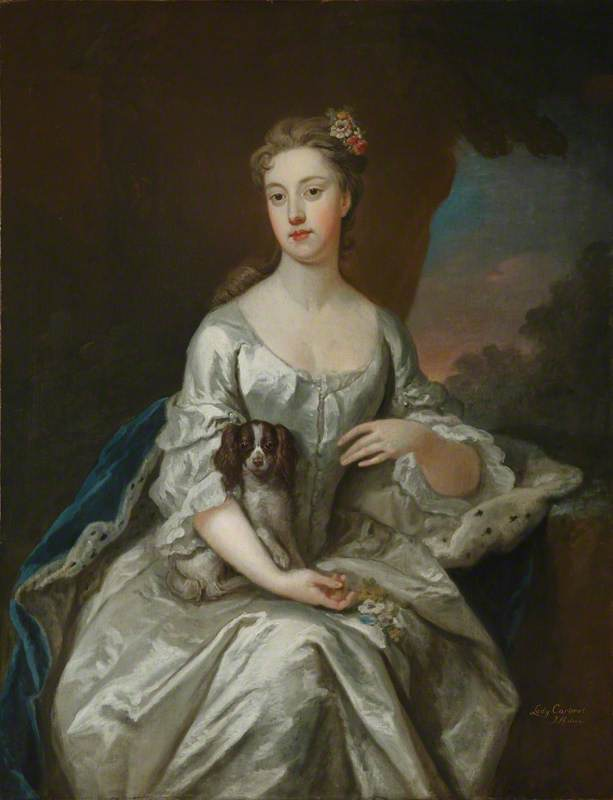
- 1715 portrait by Godfrey Kneller

Viceregal-Consort of Ireland
- In office 6 May 1724 – 23 June 1730
- Monarchs: George I George II
- Preceded by: Lady Henrietta Somerset
- Succeeded by: Elizabeth Sackville, Duchess of Dorset

Personal details
- Born: 6 March 1694 Appuldurcombe House, Isle of Wight
- Died: 20 June 1743 (aged 49)
- Spouse: John Carteret, 2nd Baron Carteret (m. 1710)
- Children: Louisa; Grace; Georgiana; George; Frances; Robert Carteret, 3rd Earl Granville
- Parent(s): Sir Robert Worsley, 4th Baronet; Frances Thynne, Lady Worsley

Frances Carteret, Lady Carteret (née Worsley, 6 March 1694 – 20 June 1743) was an English noblewoman who served as the vicereine of Ireland. Known as a popular hostess, she was the subject of poetry by Jonathan Swift and Patrick Delany.

== Family ==
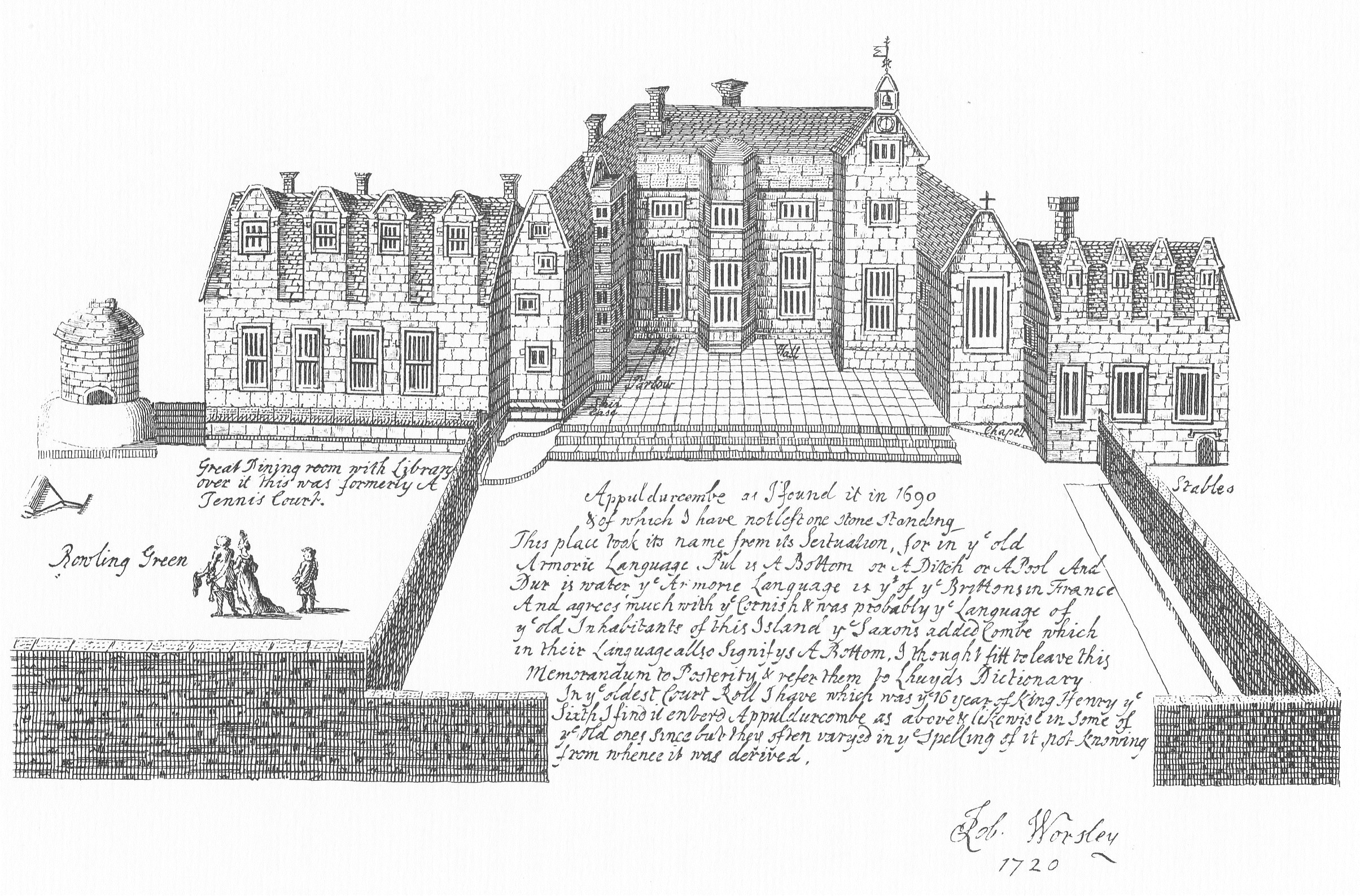
Appuldurcombe House was rebuilt by Frances' father during her childhood

Frances was the daughter of Sir Robert Worsley, 4th Baronet of Appuldurcombe, Isle of Wight, and his wife Frances Thynne, daughter of Thomas Thynne, 1st Viscount Weymouth.

She married John Carteret, 2nd Baron Carteret at Longleat on 17 October 1710 at the age of 16. They had at least six children:

- Louisa Carteret (c.1712–1736), who married Thomas Thynne, 2nd Viscount Weymouth
- Grace Carteret (b. 1713), who married Lionel Tollemache, 4th Earl of Dysart
- Georgiana Caroline Carteret (1715–1780), who married John Spencer MP and then William Clavering-Cowper, 2nd Earl Cowper
- George Carteret (b. 1716), who predeceased his father
- Frances Carteret (b. 1718) who married John Hay, 4th Marquess of Tweeddale
- Robert Carteret, 3rd Earl Granville (1721–1776).

== Vicereine of Ireland ==
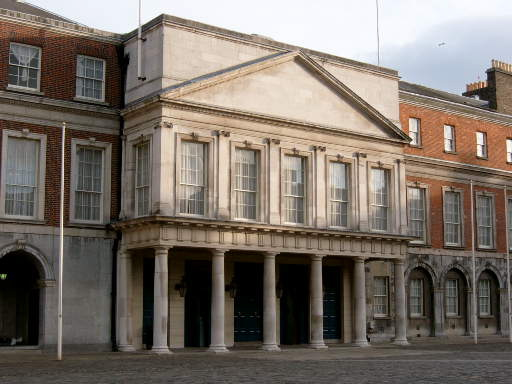
Viceregal apartments at Dublin Castle

When her husband became Lord Lieutenant of Ireland in 1724, Lady Carteret accompanied him to Ireland for what would become thirty months of visits there over a five-and-a-half year viceregency. She endeared herself to the people of Ireland by signalling her early commitment to the role when she brought her young daughters to live with her there, and accompanying her husband on all his visits. She entertaining members of opposing political factions at the viceregal apartment at Dublin Castle during the controversy over Wood's halfpence which agitated the beginning of Carteret's viceregency.

Developing the social role of the viceregal office, she imitated the Hanoverian Court and Caroline, Princess of Wales, holding 'drawing-rooms' twice a week. This made her 'court' the focus of local society and set a new standard for hospitality by a vicereine.

Lady Carteret was notable for her beauty, her singing voice, and the fortuitous matches she made for her daughters. A keen attender of musical events in London, she hosted plays and concerts at the Castle, and Lord and Lady Carteret would boost the numbers in the audience at a play by attending it.

She was a sought-after patroness of the arts, being the dedicatee of literary works by Jonathan Swift (a friend of Frances and her mother), Patrick Delany and Thomas Sheridan. She is the subject of several poems, such as 'Apology to Lady Carteret,' attributed to either Swift or Delany, which apologises for a missed invitation to dine at Dublin Castle and celebrates 'the living lustre of [Lady Carteret]'s eyes.'

Jonathan Swift called her 'the best queen we have known in Ireland these many years.'

== Death ==
In 1743 Lady Carteret accompanied her husband on his journey to Hanover, Germany in his capacity of Secretary of State for the Northern Department. She was taken ill as he was departing for the Battle of Dettingen, but encouraged him to leave her behind. She died on 20 June 1743.
