= Louisa Thynne =

Louisa Thynne may refer to:

- Louisa Thynne, Viscountess Weymouth, (c.1712–1736), English noblewoman
- Louisa Finch, Countess of Aylesford (born Louisa Thynne, 1760–1832), English naturalist and botanical illustrator
