= Louisa Thynne, Viscountess Weymouth =

British peer

- Born: The Hon. Louisa Carteret; 15 September 1714
- Died: 25 December 1736 (aged 22); London, England
- Spouse: Thomas Thynne (m. 1733)
- Children: 2, Thomas and Henry
- Father: John Carteret
- Relatives: Robert Carteret (brother); Georgiana Clavering-Cowper (sister); John Spencer (nephew); George Carteret (grandfather)

Louisa Thynne, Viscountess Weymouth (née Carteret; 15 September 1714 – 25 December 1736) was an English noblewoman. She was the second wife of Thomas Thynne, 2nd Viscount Weymouth. She was the daughter of John Carteret, 2nd Earl Granville, and his first wife, the former Frances Worsley.

== Biography ==
Louisa married the viscount on 3 July 1733, four years after the death of his first wife.

They had two children:

- Thomas Thynne, 1st Marquess of Bath, 3rd Viscount Weymouth (13 September 1734 – 19 November 1796)
- Henry Frederick Carteret, 1st Baron Carteret of Hawnes (17 November 1735 – 17 June 1826)

Louisa's portrait was painted by John Vanderbank; in the picture, she wears "a fancy dress of pink and black".

A myth has evolved that the family home of Longleat House is haunted by Louisa's ghost, grieving over the death of her lover, who was discovered and killed by her husband. There is no historical evidence for the existence of the lover. Her friend, Mrs Delany, wrote in her memoirs: "I know some who had higher virtues than she had, but none with fewer faults. Her husband's ... loss is irreparable."

The viscountess died in childbirth at her home in Grosvenor Square, London, and was buried in the traditional Thynne family resting-place of Longbridge Deverill, Wiltshire. The 3rd viscount succeeded to the Carteret estates on the death of Louisa's brother, Robert Carteret, 3rd Earl Granville, in 1776.
