= Robert Carteret, 3rd Earl Granville =

English nobleman and politician

The Right Honourable The Earl Granville
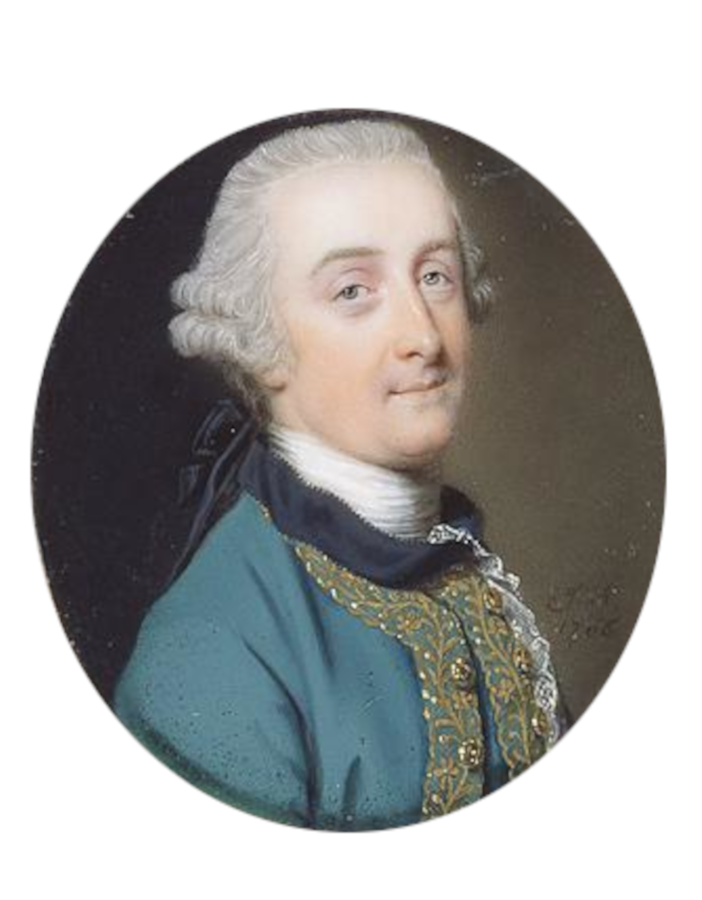
- Other titles: 3rd Baron Carteret
- Born: 21 September 1721; Westminster, Middlesex, Great Britain
- Died: 13 February 1776 (aged 54)
- Offices: Member of Parliament for Yarmouth Bailiff of Jersey
- Noble family: De Carteret family
- Father: John Carteret, 1st Earl Granville
- Mother: Frances Worsley

Robert Carteret, 3rd Earl Granville, 3rd Baron Carteret (21 September 1721 – 13 February 1776) was an English nobleman and politician who was Member of Parliament for Yarmouth (1744–1747) and hereditary Bailiff of Jersey from (1763–1776).

== Early life ==
Robert Carteret, born in 1721 and was the son of John Carteret, 2nd Earl Granville, who was the Lord President of the Council and Frances Worsley, daughter of Sir Robert Worsley, 4th Baronet.

He was educated at Westminster School (1731–1738) and St John's College (1738).

== Parliament ==
Carteret in April 1744 tried to become the candidate for Cornwall, but was unsuccessful. He instead would run to be the Member of Parliament for Yarmouth during a by-election in 1744, he would not run for re-election after his term.

== Marriage ==
He married a French woman named Elizabeth (died 1766); however, they did not have any issue.

== Americas ==
Carteret, due to his inheritance from his father and his Royalist great-great-grandfather Sir George Carteret, owned vast territories in the Province of Carolina. After the outbreak of rebellion, Carteret would refuse to sell the land. After his death in 1776 his nephew Henry Carteret, 1st Baron Carteret would inherit the land; however, as a result of the American Revolutionary War, all land of those who supported the British was seized by the Americans. The British government would give partial compensation for the lost land.

== Ancestry ==
Ancestors of Robert Carteret, 3rd Earl Granville

16. Sir George Carteret, 1st Baronet
8. Sir Philip Carteret
17. Elizabeth de Carteret
4. George Carteret, 1st Baron Carteret
18. Edward Montagu, 1st Earl of Sandwich
9. Jemima Montagu
19. Jemimah Crew
2. John Carteret, 2nd Earl Granville
20. Sir Bevil Grenville
10. John Granville, 1st Earl of Bath
21. Grace Smith
5. Grace Granville, 1st Countess Granville
22. Sir Peter Wyche
11. Jane Wyche
23. Elizabeth Saltonstall
1. Robert Carteret, 3rd Earl Granville
24. Sir Henry Worsley, 2nd Baronet
12. Sir Robert Worsley, 3rd Baronet
25. Bridget Wallop
6. Sir Robert Worsley, 4th Baronet
26. Hon. James Herbert
13. Mary Herbert
27. Jane Spiller
3. Frances Worsley
28. Sir Henry Frederick Thynne, 1st Baronet
14. Thomas Thynne, 1st Viscount Weymouth
29. Mary Coventry
7. Frances Thynne
30. Heneage Finch, 3rd Earl of Winchilsea
15. Frances Finch
31. Mary Seymour

Peerage of Great Britain
Preceded by John Carteret	Earl Granville; 1763–1776	Extinct
