= St John's Church, Wroxall =

Coordinates: 50°36′59″N 01°13′21″W

St. John's Church, Wroxall
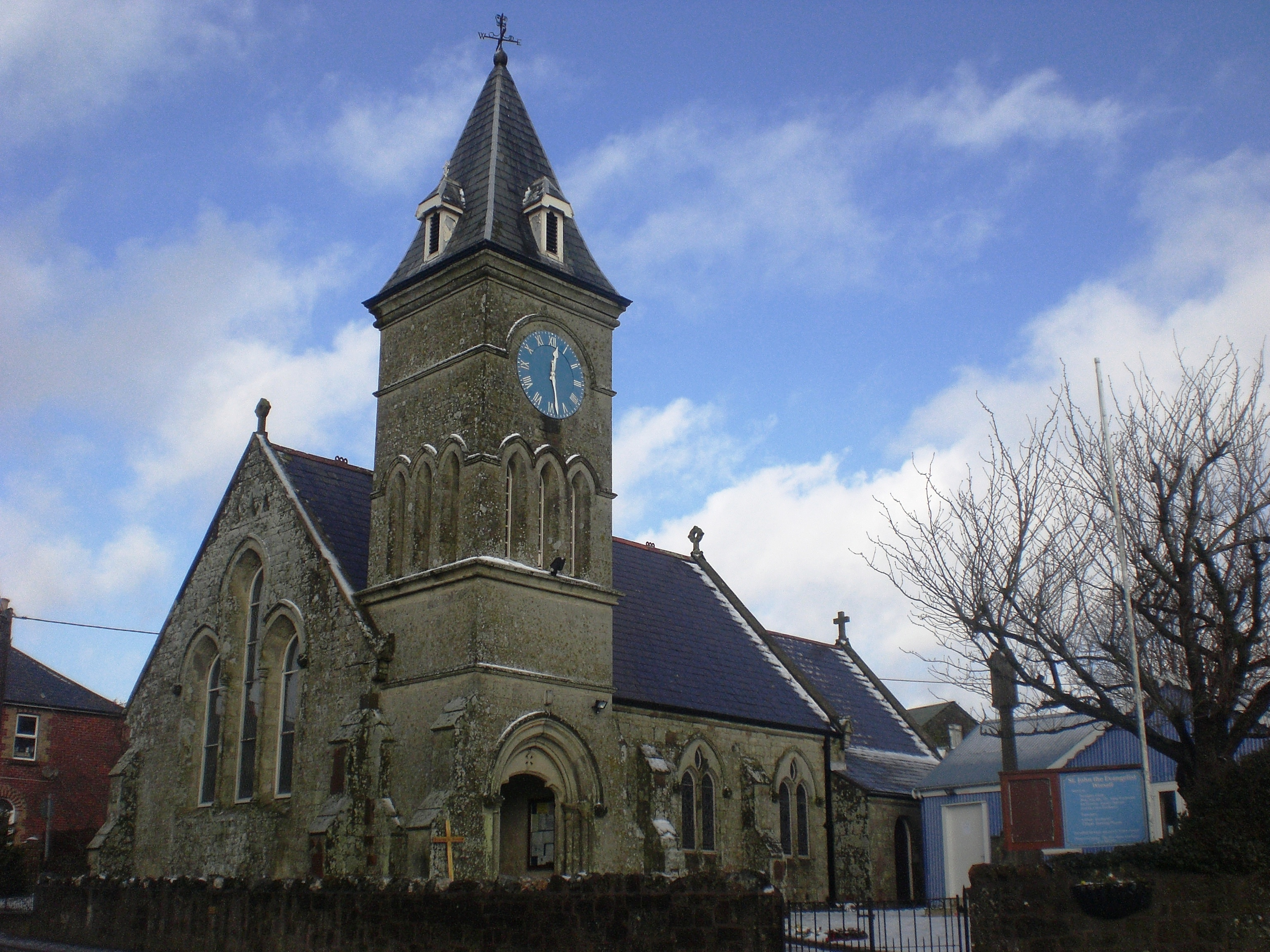
- St. John's Church, Wroxall
- St. John's Church, Wroxall
- Denomination: Church of England
- Churchmanship: Broad Church

History
- Dedication: St. John

Administration
- Province: Canterbury
- Diocese: Portsmouth
- Parish: Wroxall, Isle of Wight

St. John's Church, Wroxall is a parish church in the Church of England located in Wroxall, Isle of Wight, England.

== History ==
The church dates from 1875 to 1877 by the architect T. R. Saunders. The tower was added in 1911.

Its consecration service was performed by the Archdeacon of Winchester on 21 December 1877. The church consisted of a chancel, nave, organ chamber, south porch and a small western belfry housing one bell, and provided seating for 130.

The stone excavated during the construction of the nearby Ventnor railway tunnel provided the building material. This kept down costs but it has since proved to be of poor quality and the building is in constant need of refacing.

== Organ ==
The organ was built by A. Hunter & Son. A specification of the organ can be found on the National Pipe Organ Register.
