= Fleetwood baronets of Caldwick (1611) =

Escutcheon of the Fleetwood baronets of Caldwick

The Fleetwood baronetcy, of Calwiche, parish of Ellastone in the County of Stafford, was created in the Baronetage of England by James I on 19 June 1611 for Richard Fleetwood. He was High Sheriff of Staffordshire in 1614 and built Wootton Lodge at Ellastone. The title became extinct on the death of the 6th Baronet in 1780.

== Fleetwood baronets, of Caldwick (1611) ==
- Sir Richard Fleetwood, 1st Baronet (died 1649)
- Sir Thomas Fleetwood, 2nd Baronet (1609–1670)
- Sir Richard Fleetwood, 3rd Baronet (1628–1700)
- Sir Thomas Fleetwood, 4th Baronet (died 1739)
- Sir John Fleetwood, 5th Baronet (died 1741)
- Sir Thomas Fleetwood, 6th Baronet (1741–1780)

== Notes ==
Baronetage of England
Preceded by Worsley baronets	Fleetwood baronets of Caldwick 29 June 1611	Succeeded by Spencer baronets
