= Wroxall, Isle of Wight =

Village on the Isle of Wight, England

Coordinates: 50.6159°N 1.2227°W

Wroxall
- Village
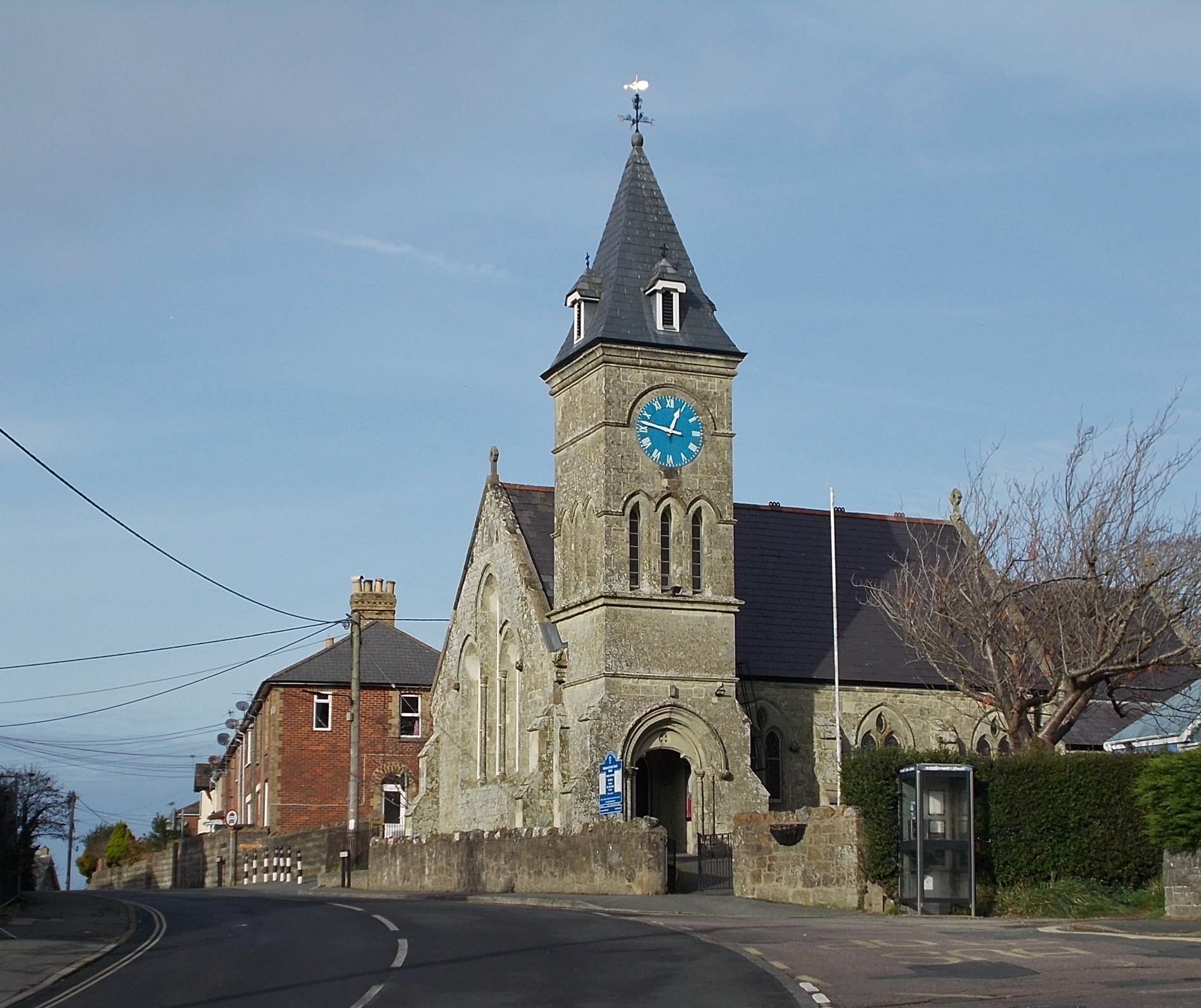
- St. John's Church, Wroxall village centre.

- Location within the Isle of Wight
- Area: 2.9 sq mi (7.5 km^{2})
- Population: 1,709 (2021, including some of Whitely Bank)
  - Density: 589/sq mi (227/km^{2})
- OS grid reference: SZ550798
- Civil parish: Wroxall
- Unitary authority: Isle of Wight
- Ceremonial county: Isle of Wight
- Region: South East
- Country: England
- Sovereign state: United Kingdom
- Post town: VENTNOR
- Postcode district: PO38
- Dialling code: 01983
- Police: Hampshire and Isle of Wight
- Fire: Hampshire and Isle of Wight
- Ambulance: Isle of Wight
- UK Parliament: Isle of Wight East

Wroxall (also spelt Wroxhall) is a village and civil parish in the central south of the Isle of Wight, England. In 2021 the parish had a population of 1,709. It is close to Appuldurcombe House, and the parish church is St. John's Church.

The village also has a primary school and a shop.

== Name ==
Its name means 'the nook of land or secluded hollow frequented by buzzards or other birds of prey', from Old English wrocc (genitive case wrocces) and h(e)alh.

1038-1044: Wroccesheale

1086 (Domesday Book): Warochesselle

1155-1160: Wroxala

1188-1189: Wrokeshale

1305: Wroxhale

1769: Wroxall

The Wroxall Stream flows near and is named after the village.

== History ==
Before a railway was constructed, a wagonette was the main method of transport. Afterwards, a stagecoach ran from Godshill to Freshwater, with a change of horses at Brighstone.

Many of the houses on the village's main road were built for the workmen who were tunneling to Ventnor through the downs to construct the railway.

Two cottages in the centre may have been involved in smuggling.

Much of the development of the village seemed to have happened during the Victorian era.

There are 16 listed buildings in and around Wroxall.

== Geography ==
The village is surrounded by St Martin's Down, Littledown, Span Down and Stenbury Down. It is located on chalk downland.

== Current transport ==
Bus services operated by Southern Vectis link the village with the towns of Newport, Ryde, Sandown, Shanklin and Ventnor, as well as intermediate villages and hamlets.

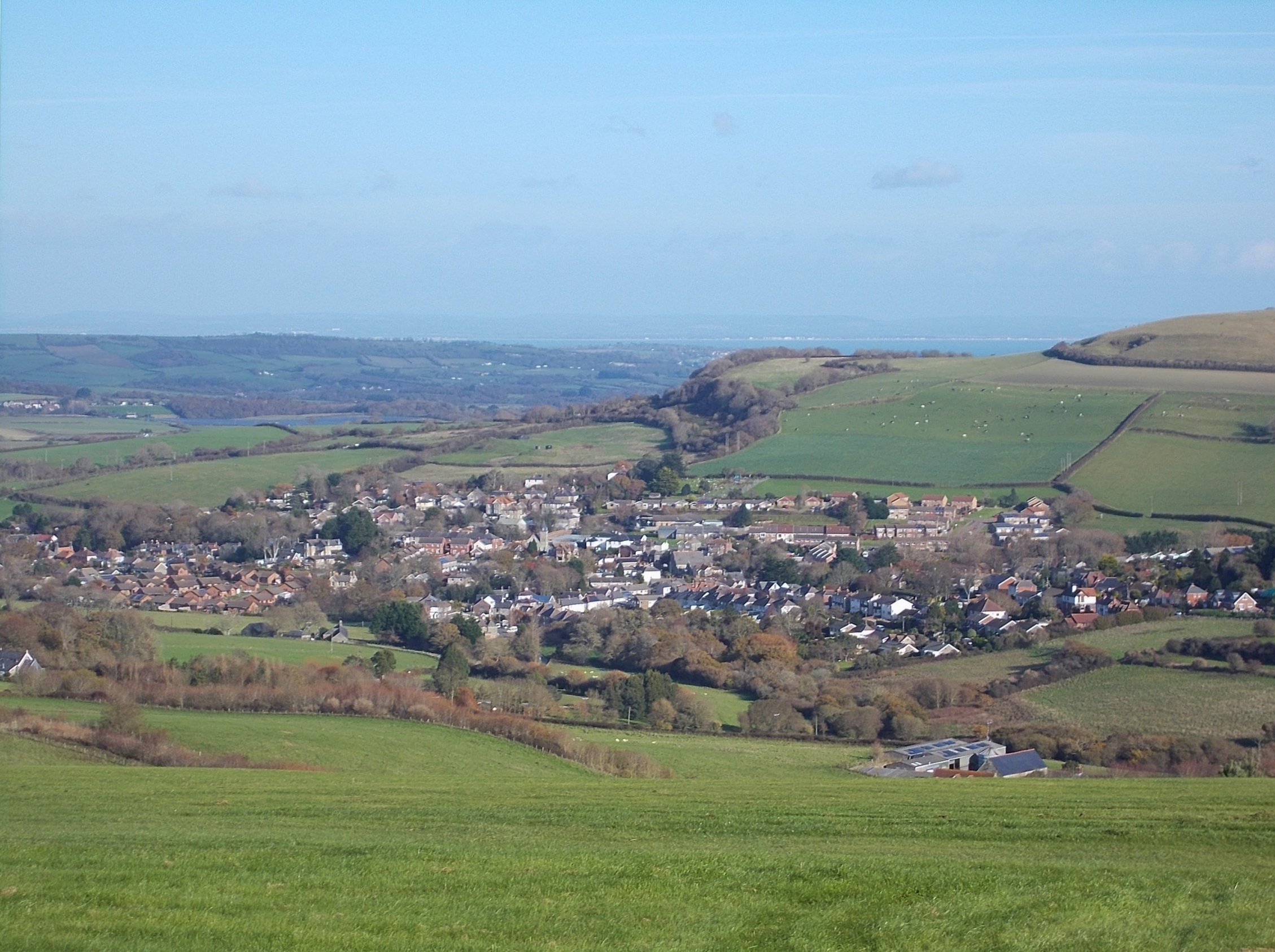
View of Wroxall from Stenbury Down
