= Frances Thynne, Lady Worsley =

English noblewoman (1673 – 1750)

The Honourable Lady Worsley
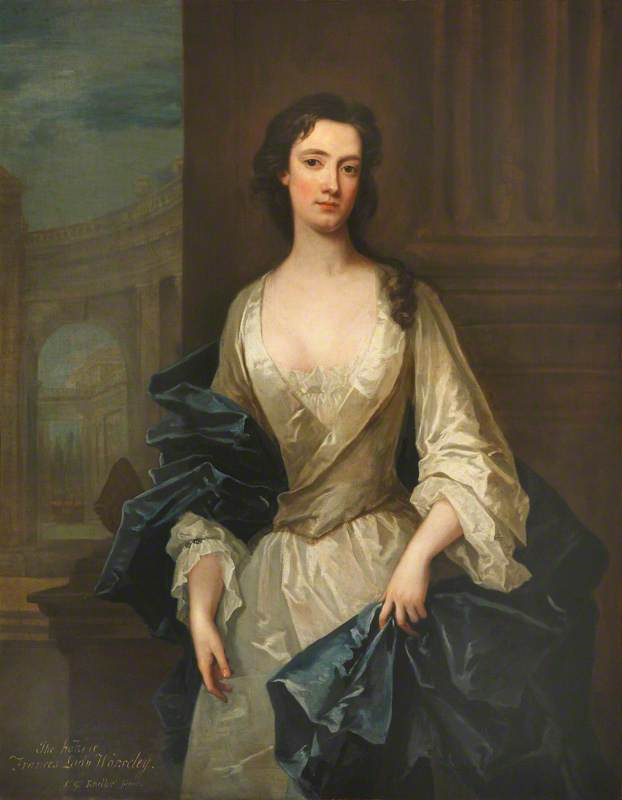
- Portrait by Charles Jervas

Personal details
- Born: Frances Thynne, 1673
- Died: 1750
- Spouse: Sir Robert Worsley, 4th Baronet
- Children: Frances, Lady Carteret
- Parent(s): Thomas Thynne, 1st Viscount Weymouth; Lady Frances Finch

Frances Thynne, Lady Worsley (née Thynne, 1673 – 1750) was an English noblewoman connected to several poets of the Augustan era.

She was one of three children of Thomas Thynne, 1st Viscount Weymouth, and his wife Lady Frances Finch (daughter of 3rd Earl of Winchilsea).

In 1690 she married Sir Robert Worsley, 4th baronet. They had one daughter, Frances, Lady Carteret. They lived at Appuldurcome House, Isle of Wight, which Sir Robert began rebuilding in 1702.

== Poetic connections ==
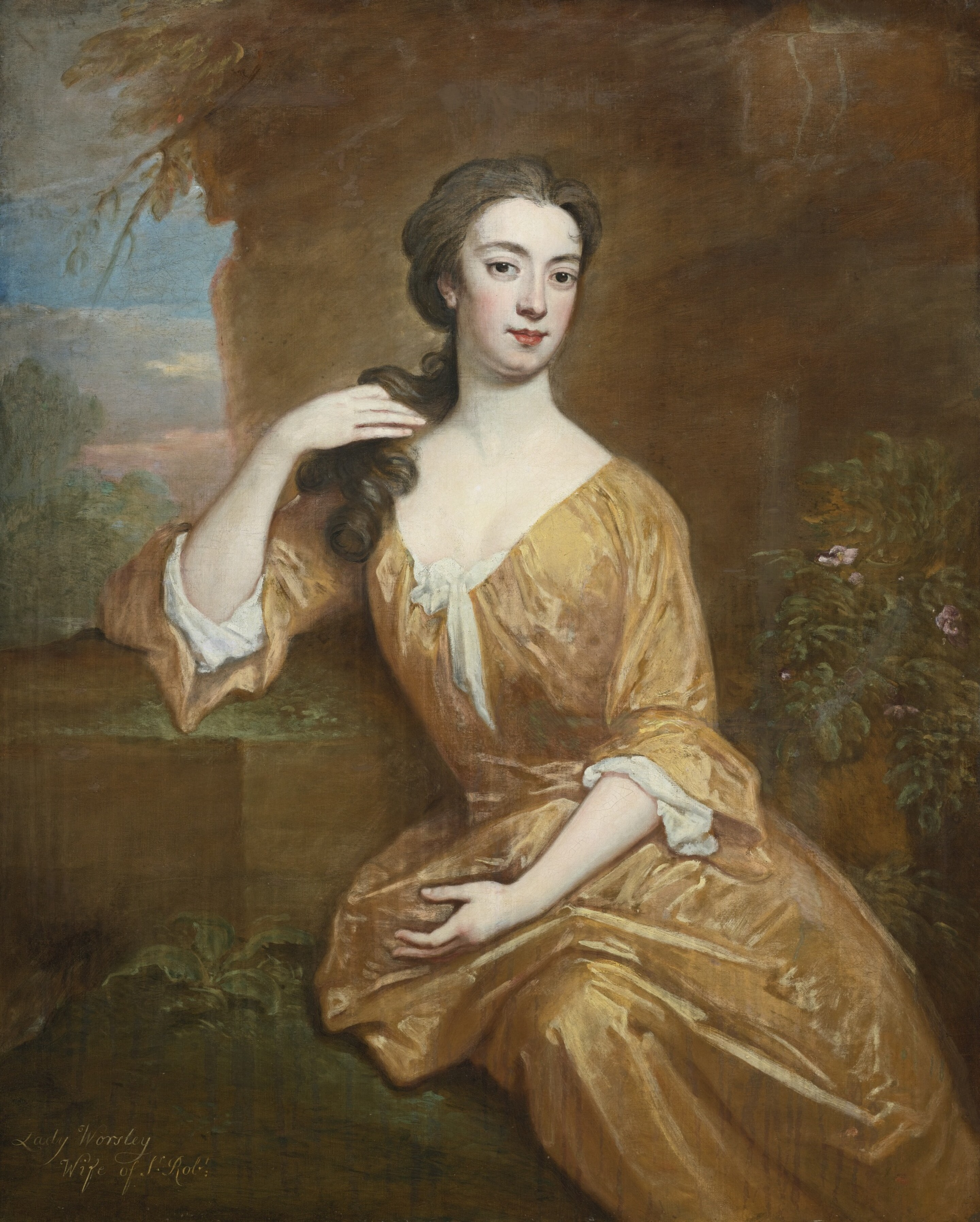
Frances, Lady Worsley by Godfrey Kneller

Lady Worsley's maternal aunt in-law was Anne Finch, Countess of Winchilsea, who wrote poems about her and her siblings. She held a long-running correspondence with Lady Winchilsea and with Jonathan Swift, who held her in high regard. Her daughter Frances would continue this friendship with Swift. Alexander Pope's poem 'Epistle to Mr Jervas' contains the line 'Other beauties envy Worsley's eyes,' referring to Lady Frances Worsley. However, this compliment was originally intended for Lady Mary Wortley Montagu, and was changed to Worsley after Lady Mary and the poet had quarrelled.

Family tree summary for the Thynnes of Longleat from about 1500

Ralph Botevile
Thomas Thynne	William Thynne d. 1546
John Thynne of Longleat alias Boteville c. 1515–1580	Francis Thynne c. 1544–1608
John Thynne of Longleat; 1555–1604	Charles Thynne c. 1568–1652
Thomas Thynne of Longleat c. 1578–1639
Baronet of Caus Castle, of Kempsford in the County of Gloucester, 1641
James of Longleat; 1605–1670	Thomas of Richmond d. 1669	Henry Frederick Thynne; 1615–1680; 1st Baronet of Kempsford
Baron Thynne, 1680; Viscount Weymouth, 1682
Thomas of Longleat; 1648–1682	Thomas Thynne; 1640–1714 inherited Longleat, 1682; 1st Viscount Weymouth, etc., 2nd Baronet of Kempsford	James Thynne of Buckland d. 1709	Henry Thynne Frederick d. 1705
unmarried
Henry Thynne; 1675–1708	Thomas Thynne d. 1710
two daughters but no sons
Thomas Thynne; 1710–1751; 2nd Viscount Weymouth, etc., 3rd Baronet of Kempsford
Marquess of Bath, 1789	Baron Carteret (2nd creation), 1784
Thomas Thynne; 1734–1796; 1st Marquess of Bath, 3rd Viscount Weymouth, etc., 4th Baronet of Kempsford	Henry Frederick Carteret; 1735–1826; 1st Baron Carteret
Thomas Thynne; 1765–1837; 2nd Marquess of Bath, 4th Viscount Weymouth, etc., 5th Baronet of Kempsford	George Thynne; 1770–1838; 2nd Baron Carteret	John Thynne; 1772–1849; 3rd Baron Carteret
Carteret barony extinct, 1849
Henry Frederick Thynne 1797–1837; 3rd Marquess of Bath, 5th Viscount Weymouth, etc., 6th Baronet of Kempsford	Edward Thynne; 1807–1884	Charlotte Anne Thynne; 1811–1895 marr.: Walter Montagu Douglas Scott, Duke of Buccleuch and had issue.
John Alexander Thynne; 1831–1896; 4th Marquess of Bath, 6th Viscount Weymouth, etc., 7th Baronet of Kempsford	Henry "Harry" Frederick Thynne; 1832–1904
Thomas Henry Thynne; 1862–1946; 5th Marquess of Bath, 7th Viscount Weymouth, etc., 8th Baronet of Kempsford	Ulric Oliver Thynne; 1871–1957
Henry Frederick Thynne; 1905–1992; 6th Marquess of Bath, 8th Viscount Weymouth, etc., 9th Baronet of Kempsford
Thomas Timothy Thynne; 1929–1930	Alexander George Thynn; 1930–2020; 7th Marquess of Bath, 9th Viscount Weymouth, etc., 10th Baronet of Kempsford	Christopher John Thynne; 1934–2017	Valentine Charles Thynne; 1937–1979
Ceawlin Henry Laszlo Thynn b. 1974; 8th Marquess of Bath, 10th Viscount Weymouth, etc., 11th Baronet of Kempsford	Lucien Henry Valentine Thynne b. 1965
John Alexander Ladi Thynn b. 2014 styled Viscount Weymouth
Heir apparent to the Marquess of Bath
