= Henry Worsley (diplomat) =

English Army officer, diplomat and politician

Lieutenant-Colonel Henry Worsley (1672 – 15 March 1740), of Compton, Hampshire, was an English Army officer, diplomat and politician who sat in the English and British House of Commons from 1705 to 1715, initially as a Whig, and later as a Tory. He was ambassador to Portugal from 1714 to 1722 and Governor of Barbados from 1722 to 1731.

== Early life ==
Worsley was the second son of Sir Robert Worsley, 3rd Baronet, of Appuldurcombe, Isle of Wight and his wife Mary Herbert, daughter of Hon. James Herbert, MP of Kingsey, Buckinghamshire. He was admitted at Lincoln's Inn on 30 April 1690 and matriculated at St. Edmund Hall, Oxford on 14 August 1690.

== Army career ==
Worsley joined the Army as an ensign in Colonel William Beveridge's Regiment of Foot (later the 14th Regiment of Foot) in 1689, becoming a lieutenant in 1693, and seeing action in Scotland and Flanders, where he was present at the battles of Landen and Namur. He transferred to become a captain in Colonel Francis Fergus O’Farrell’s Foot Regiment (later the 21st Foot) in 1693 and then as a captain-lieutenant in the 1st Foot Guards in 1700, rising in turn to captain and lieutenant-colonel between 1702 and 1708.

== Political and diplomatic career ==
Worsley was returned unopposed as a Whig Member of Parliament for Newtown, Isle of Wight on the interest of his brother, Sir Robert Worsley, 4th Baronet, at the 1705 English general election. He voted for the Court candidate as Speaker on 25 October 1705. He was not an active Member being a serving officer, but with other members of the family in the House, most of his contributions can not be identified. He was elected a Fellow of the Royal Society on 30 November 1705.

In 1708 Worsley retired from the Army and, having fought in Spain, was appointed an envoy to the King Charles III of Spain, but in the event was never sent. At the 1708 British general election. he was returned unopposed again as a Whig MP for Newtown. He was listed as a Court Whig and voted for the naturalisation of the Palatines in 1709 and for the impeachment of Dr Sacheverell in 1710. After the 1710 British general election with a Tory Administration, he switched to the Tory side. He became a member of the October Club, and, in 1711, was listed as a ‘worthy patriot’ who detected the mismanagements of the previous Parliament. He was hoping for office from Harley, to whom he gave his collection of manuscripts.

In 1711, Worsley went with Earl Rivers to Hanover to explain the proposed peace terms to the court, but declined a permanent post as financially insufficient. He voted for the French commerce bill on 18 June 1713, but was later considered as a Tory who sometimes voted with the Whigs. He was returned again unopposed for Newtown at the 1713 British general election and shortly afterwards was appointed Envoy to Portugal, by the support of Lord Bolingbroke. He arrived at Lisbon in April 1714 and survived in post on the change of administration on the accession of George I. He did not stand at the 1715 British general election and remained in Portugal until 1722. In 1721 he was appointed Governor of Barbados, arriving in 1723 and holding the position until 1731, when he was removed from office after adverse complaints.

Worsley died unmarried on 15 March 1740.

Parliament of England
Preceded by Thomas Hopsonn; John Leigh	Member of Parliament for Newtown; 1705–1707; With: Sir James Worsley	Succeeded by Parliament of Great Britain
Parliament of Great Britain
Preceded by Parliament of England	Member of Parliament for Newtown; 1707–1715; With: Sir James Worsley	Succeeded by Sir James Worsley; Sir Robert Worsley
Diplomatic posts
Preceded by George Delaval	Envoy to Portugal; 1714–1722	Succeeded by Hon. Thomas Lumley
Government offices
Preceded by Samuel Cox	Governor of Barbados; 1722–1727	Succeeded by Thomas Catesby Paget
