= Sir Robert Worsley, 3rd Baronet =

English politician (1643–1675)

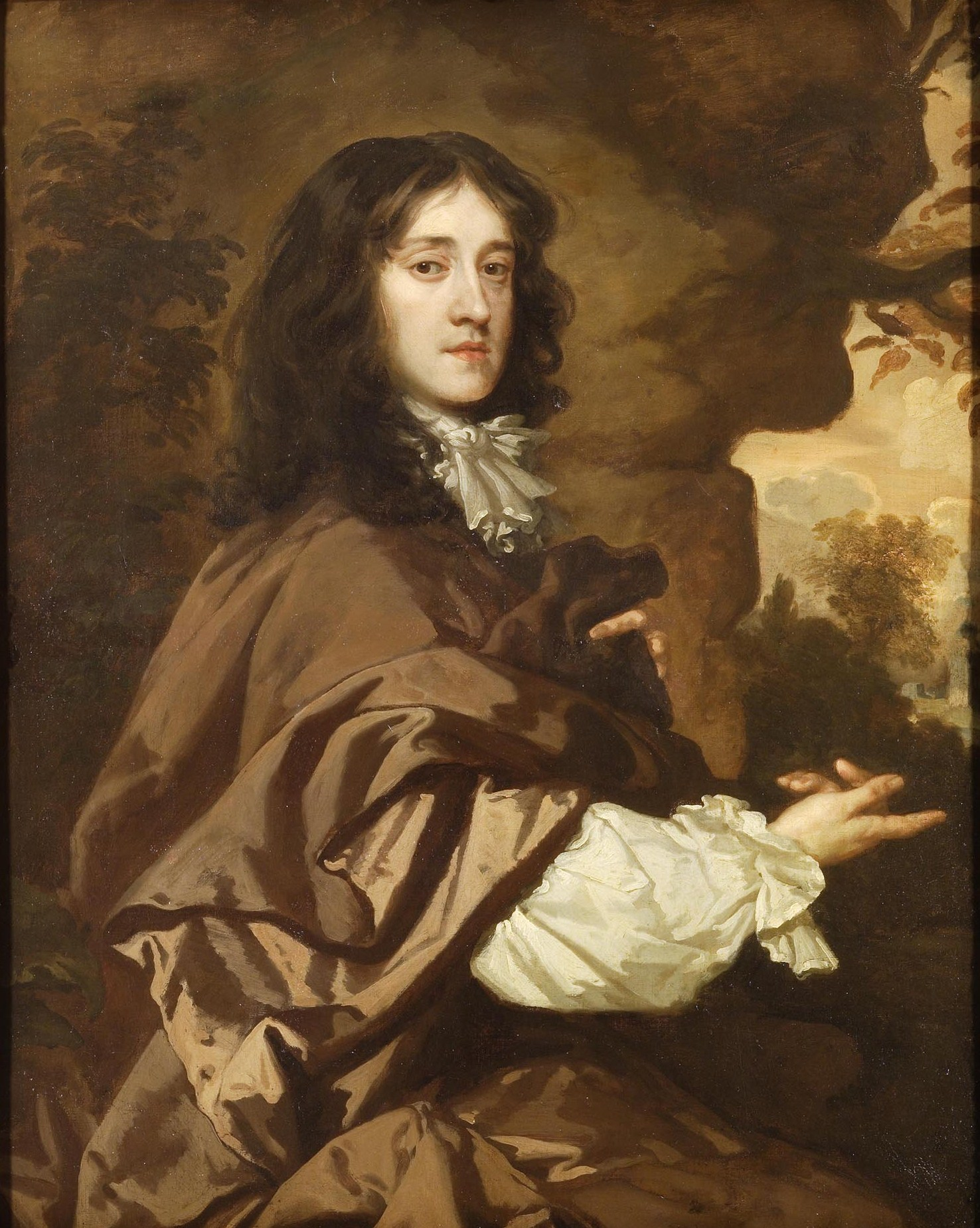
Sir Robert Worsley, painted by Sir Peter Lely

Sir Robert Worsley, 3rd Baronet (1643 – 1675 in Appuldurcombe), was an English politician who sat in the House of Commons of England during the Cavalier Parliament, representing Newtown on the Isle of Wight from 1666 to 1675. He was counted as a member of the Court party, but was not considered very active in parliament.

== Family ==
He was the son of Sir Henry Worsley (1612–1666), the second Baronet, and Bridget, daughter of Sir Henry Wallop. He married, in 1668, Mary Herbert (died 1693), daughter of the Hon. James Herbert of Kingsey in Buckinghamshire, second surviving son of Philip Herbert, 4th Earl of Pembroke and Montgomery (1584–1650), and his wife Susan de Vere (1587–1629), youngest daughter of Edward de Vere, 17th Earl of Oxford, and thus a descendant of Sir Philip Sidney.

Mary later married, as his second wife, Edward Noel, 1st Earl of Gainsborough.

He was succeeded by his eldest son, Robert. His second son Henry became an army officer, MP and Governor of Barbados. His daughter Jane married Sir Nathaniel Napier, 3rd Baronet, but died without issue.

== Life ==
Worsley was knighted at Whitehall on 29 December 1664 and succeeded to the baronetcy 11 September 1666. He was elected member of parliament for Newtown in November 1666, and served until his death. He was seated at Apuldercombe (or now Appuldurcombe), on the Isle of Wight, where his family had come into the possession of a large Tudor mansion (later replaced by the grand eighteenth century Appuldurcombe House).

Parliament of England
Preceded by Sir Henry Worsley, Bt	Member of Parliament for Newtown; 1666–1675; With: Sir John Barrington, Bt	Succeeded by Admiral Sir John Holmes
Baronetage of England
Preceded by Henry Worsley	Baronet (of Appuldurcombe); 1666–1675	Succeeded by Robert Worsley
