= Sir Robert Worsley, 4th Baronet =

Sir Robert Worsley, 4th Baronet (c. 1669–1747), was a British politician who sat in the House of Commons from 1715 to 1722.

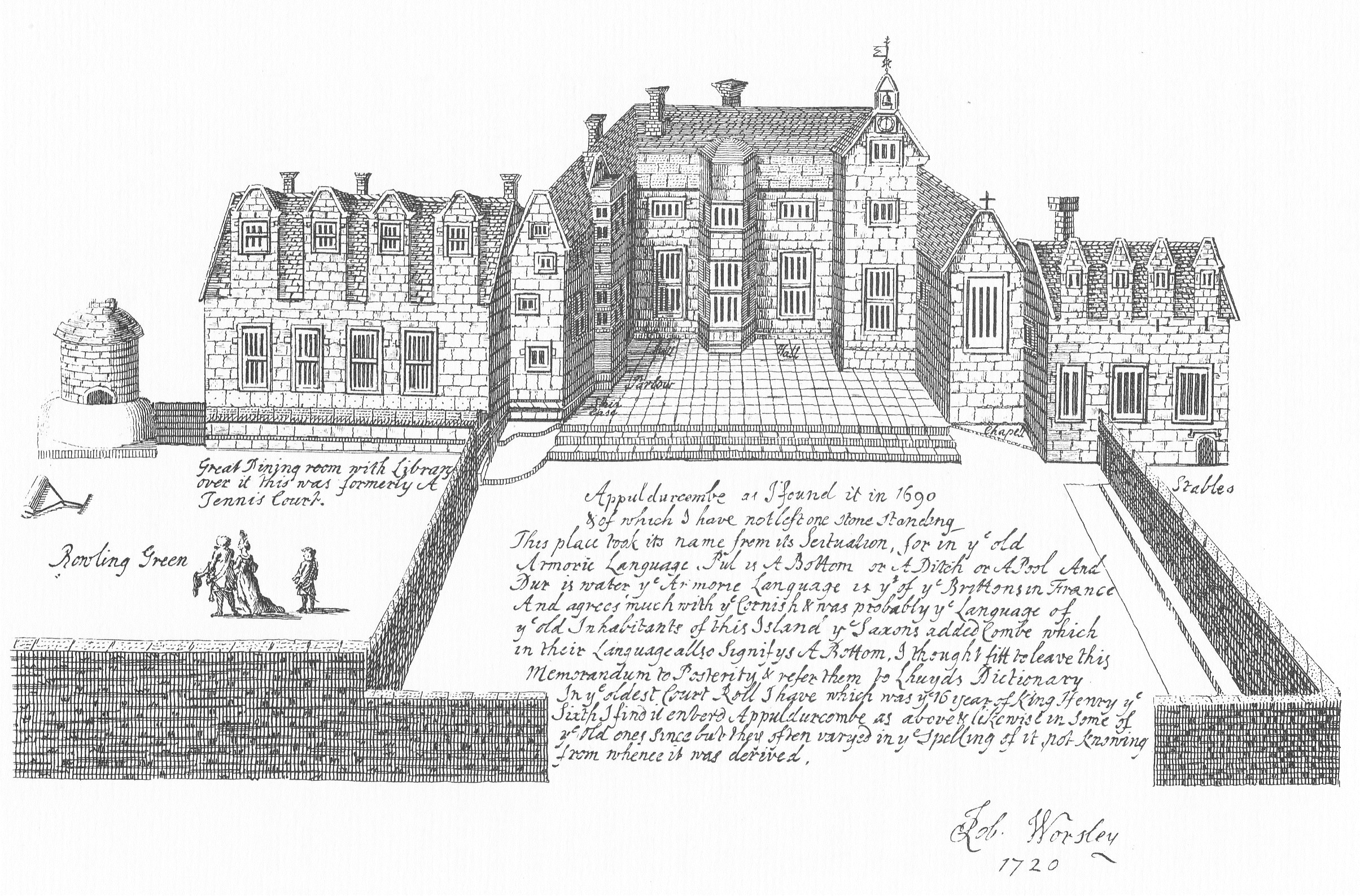
Drawing by Sir Robert Worsley of the Tudor Appuldurcombe House

Worsley was the eldest son of Sir Robert Worsley, 3rd Baronet, MP of Appuldurcombe, and his wife Mary Herbert, daughter of Hon. James Herbert of Kingsey, Buckinghamshire. In 1676, aged seven, he succeeded to the baronetcy and the manor of Appuldurcombe on the death of his father. He matriculated at Christ Church, Oxford, on 17 December 1684, aged 15. He married by licence dated 13 August 1690 Frances Thynne, daughter of Thomas Thynne, 1st Viscount Weymouth, of Longleat, Wiltshire.

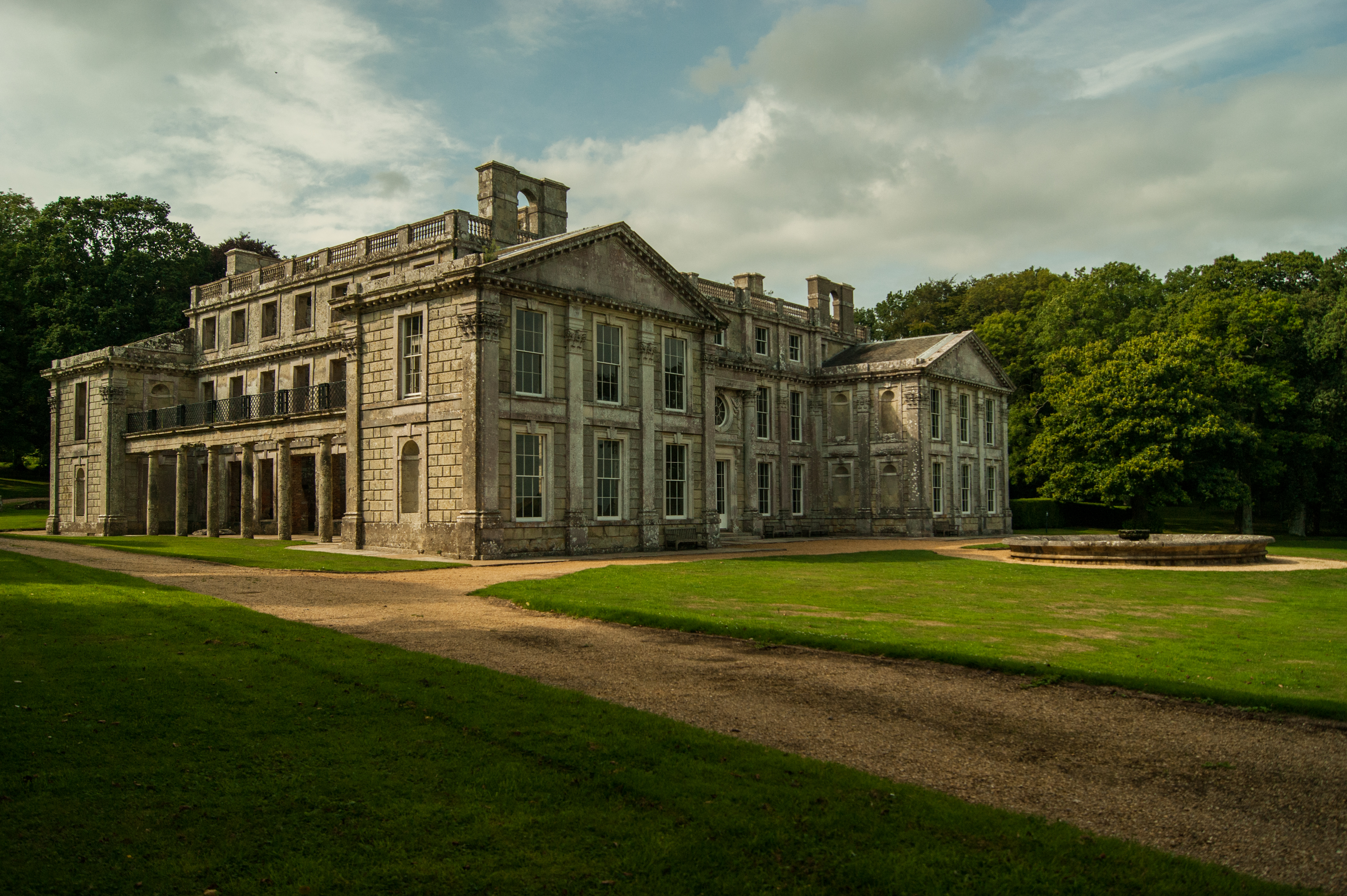
Appuldurcombe House, built for Sir Robert Worsley

Worsley was Deputy Lieutenant of Hampshire from 1699 to 1702. In 1702, he started rebuilding Appuldurcombe House which had been in his family since 1527. The architect was John James.

Worsley had an interest at the parliamentary seat of Newtown (Isle of Wight). His brother Henry represented the seat from 1705 but was sent as Ambassador to Portugal in 1713. Worsley stood in his brother's place at the 1715 general election, was returned as Member of Parliament for the seat and acted as place-holder for his brother in case he returned from Portugal. He was classed as a Tory but often voted with the Whigs. He supported the Administration on the Peerage Bill but voted against the Septennial Bill and the repeal of the Occasional Conformity and Schism Acts. He did not stand again in 1722; his brother Henry had another posting as Governor of Barbados.

Worsley died on 29 July 1747, with seven surviving daughters but no male heir. He left his mainland Hampshire property to Robert Carteret, 3rd Earl Granville, the son of his daughter, Frances. The baronetcy went to his cousin James Worsley. He had never seen his house at Appuldurcombe fully completed; it passed in trust to Sir Thomas Worsley, 6th Baronet, the son of his cousin James.

A monument was erected in his memory on Stenbury Down, overlooking his house.

Parliament of Great Britain
Preceded by James Worsley; Henry Worsley	Member of Parliament for Newtown (Isle of Wight); 1715–1722; With: James Worsley	Succeeded by William Stephens; Charles Worsley
Baronetage of England
Preceded by Robert Worsley	Baronet (of Appuldurcombe); 1676-1747	Succeeded by James Worsley
