= Stenbury Down =

Hill on the Isle of Wight, UK

Coordinates: 50.61366°N 1.24379°W

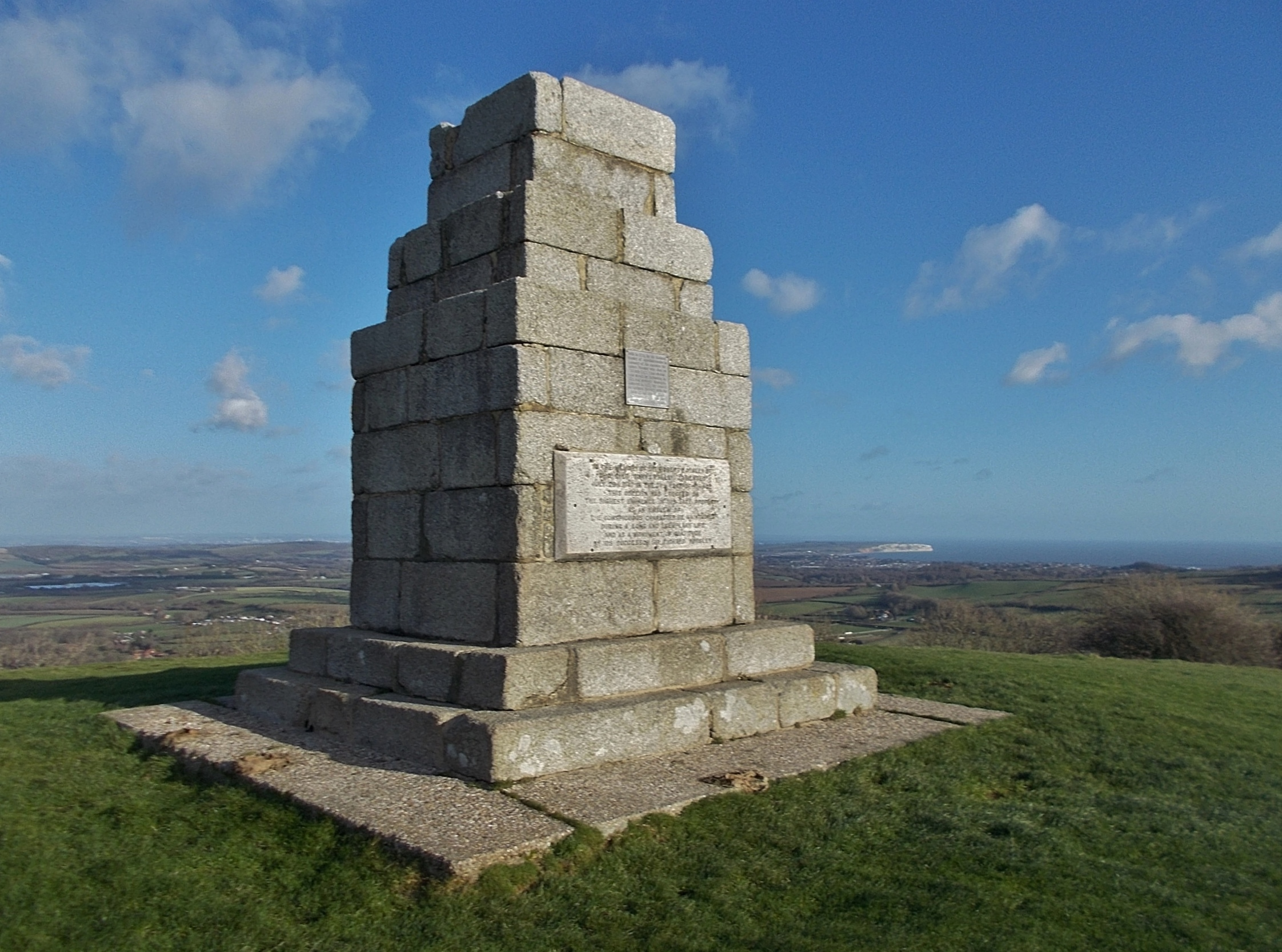
- Worsley Obelisk; view north east with Culver Cliff in the distance

Highest point
- Elevation: 226 m (741 ft)
- Listing: (none)

Geography
- Location: Isle of Wight, England
- OS grid: SZ536796
- Topo map: OS Landranger 196

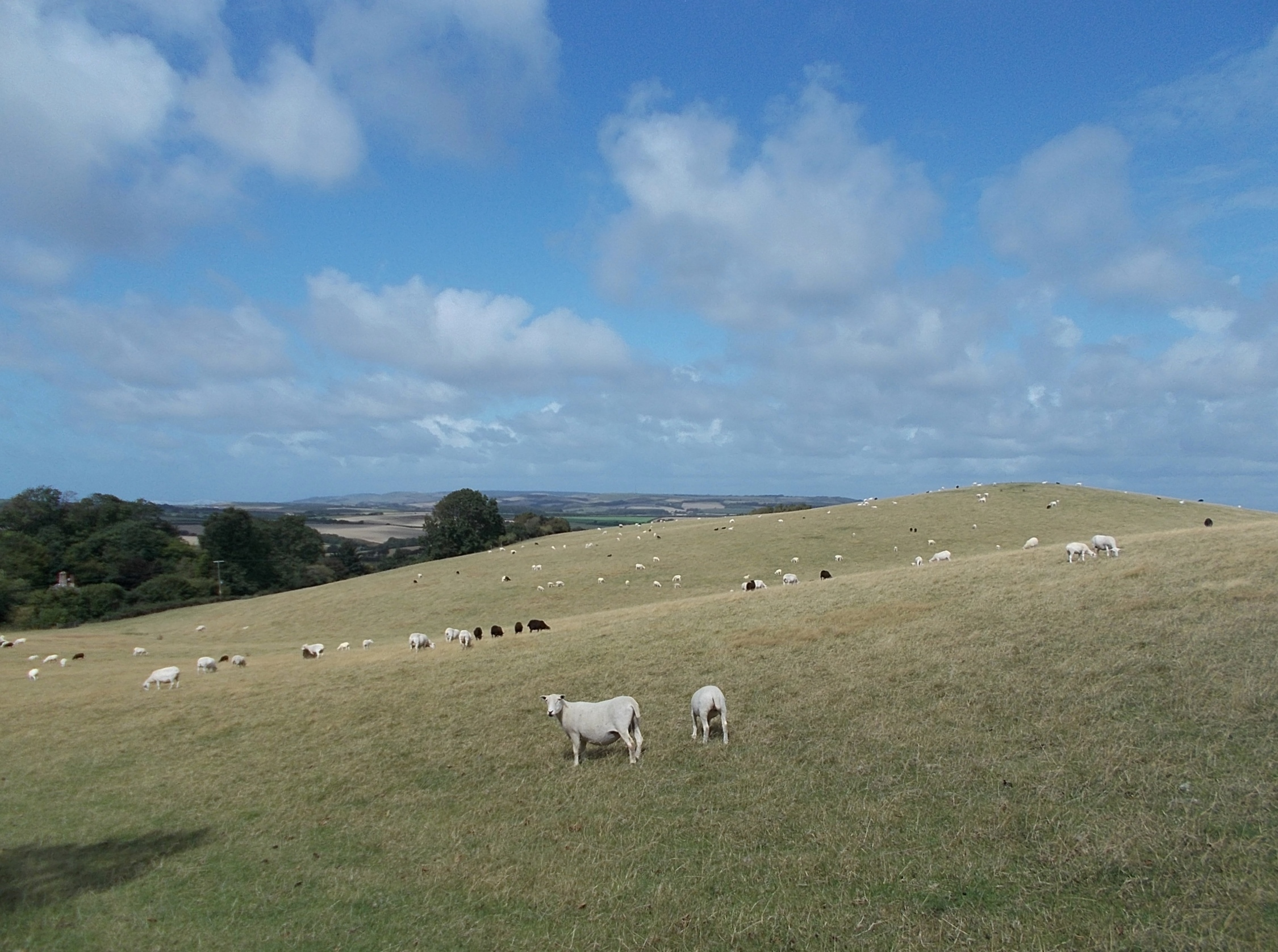
Scenery at Stenbury Down

Stenbury Down is a chalk down on the Isle of Wight. It is located close to the town of Ventnor, in the southeast of the island, and rises to 26 metres (85 ft) at its highest point, west of Wroxall, Isle of Wight. Stenbury Down is an elongate down running approximately north to south.

At the north end of Stenbury Down, also called Appuldurcombe Down, there is an obelisk erected in 1774 by Sir Richard Worsley in memory of Sir Robert Worsley of Appuldurcombe House. The monument was struck by lightning in 1831 and partially demolished. In 1983 it was restored to its current state by General Sir Richard Worsley with assistance from the Isle of Wight Council and the people of Gatcombe Parish.

There are also two prominent radio masts. The northern end terminates in the Gat Cliff, whereas the southern end transition into Week Down.

Vehicle access is available via Rew Lane and a steep unnamed road.
