= Georgiana Clavering-Cowper, Countess Cowper =

English noblewoman and literary patron

The Right Honourable The Countess Cowper
- Born: 12 March 1715
- Died: 21 August 1780 (aged 65)
- Education: Exeter College, Oxford (DCL)
- Spouse(s): John Spencer (m. 1734; died 1746) William Clavering-Cowper, 2nd Earl Cowper (m. 1750; died 1764)
- Children: John and Diana
- Parent: John Carteret

Georgiana Caroline Clavering-Cowper, Countess Cowper (née Hon. Georgiana Carteret; 12 March 1715 – 21 August 1780) was an English noblewoman and literary patron.

== Family ==
Countess Cowper was the third daughter of John Carteret and his first wife, the former Frances Worsley. Her first husband, whom she married on 14 February 1734, was John Spencer MP. They had two children:

- John Spencer, 1st Earl Spencer (19 December 1734 – 31 October 1783) who married Margaret Georgiana Poyntz in 1755 and had children, including Georgiana Cavendish, Duchess of Devonshire.
- Diana Spencer (c.1735 – c.1743)

== Later life and death ==
Spencer died in 1746; according to Horace Walpole, his death was alcohol-related. On 1 May 1750, his widow married William Clavering-Cowper, 2nd Earl Cowper, whose first wife, Henrietta Nassau d'Auverquerque, had died in 1747, leaving him with two children. There were no children from this second marriage and William died in 1764, succeeded in the earldom by Georgiana's stepson, George Clavering-Cowper.

She was an admirer of the novelist Laurence Sterne, and a patron of the Irish writer John Carteret Pilkington (1730–1763), whose semi-autobiographical work, The Real Story of John Carteret Pilkington, was published in 1760. Pilkington had been given his middle name in honour of the countess's father, who was his godfather, and named his daughter after the countess in recognition of her service to him. She was godmother to Georgiana Caroline Pilkington (1757–1838), who became the mother of the scientist Admiral William Henry Smyth and the artists Phoebe Earle and Augustus Earle.

Her portrait was painted by Godfrey Kneller. The painting was copied by Mrs Delany, whose sister Anne was also a correspondent of the countess.

She died on 21 August 1780 aged 65.
