= Appuldurcombe House =

18th-century English Baroque country house on the Isle of Wight

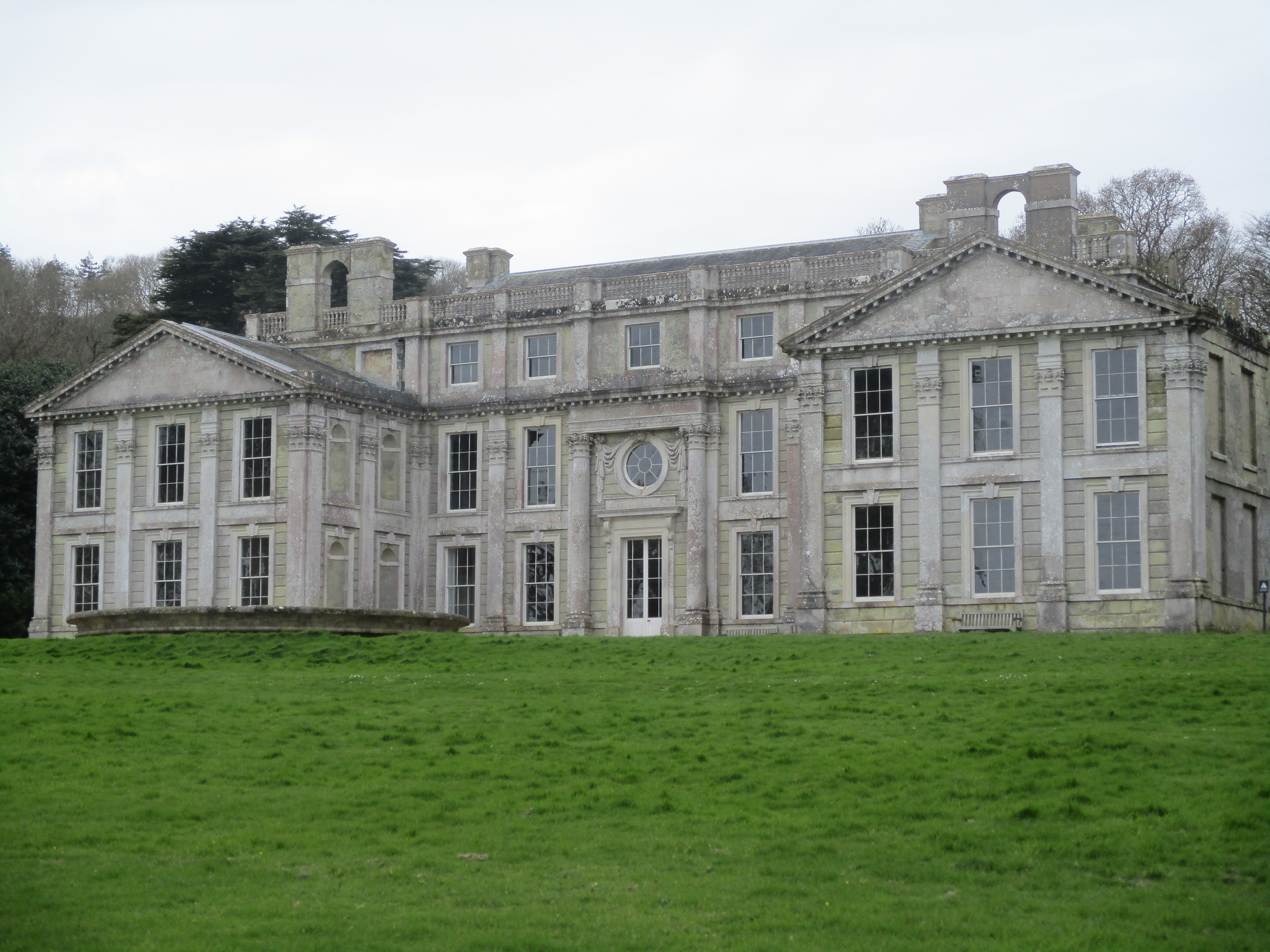

- Location within Isle of Wight

General information
- Type: House
- Architectural style: English Baroque
- Location: Wroxall
- Coordinates: 50°37′03″N 1°13′59″W
- Construction started: 1702

Design and construction
- Architect: John James

Appuldurcombe House (also spelt Appledorecombe or Appledore Combe) is the shell of a large 18th-century English Baroque country house of the Worsley family. The house is situated near to Wroxall on the Isle of Wight, England. It is now managed by English Heritage and is open to the public. A small part of the 300-acre (1.2 km^{2}; 0.47 sq mi) estate that once surrounded it is still intact, but other features of the estate are still visible in the surrounding farmland and nearby village of Wroxall, including the entrance to the park, the Freemantle Gate, now used only by farm animals and pedestrians.

== Name ==
The name means 'the valley where apple trees grow', from Old English apuldor and cumb.

1189-1204: Apldecumbe

1270: Appeldercombe

13th century: Apeldurecumbe

1289: Appeltrecoumb

1504: Appuldurcombe

== History ==
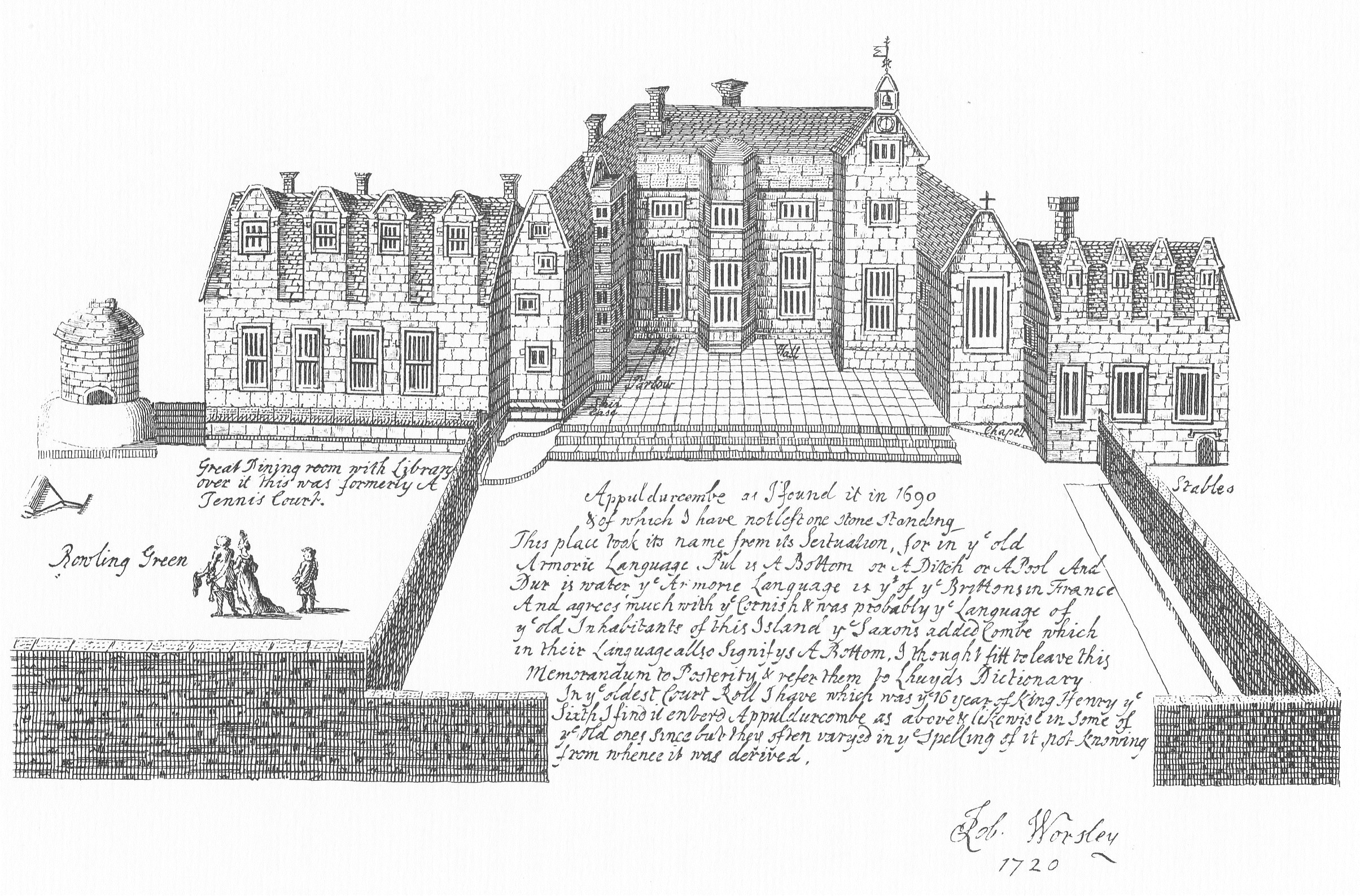
The Tudor Appuldurcombe House in 1690, drawn by Sir Robert Worsley, dated 1720

Appuldurcombe began as a priory in 1100. It became a convent, then the Elizabethan home of the Leigh family. The large Tudor mansion was bequeathed in 1690 to Sir Robert Worsley, 4th Baronet, who began planning a suitable replacement. Of the existing property, he wrote:

"Appuldurcombe as I found it in 1690 & of which I have not left one stone standing. This place took its name from its situation for in ye old Armoric Language Pul is a Bottom or Ditch or A Pool And Dur is water. ye Armoric Language is ye of ye Brittons in France And agrees much with ye Cornish & was probably ye language of ye old inhabitants of this Island. ye Saxons added Combe which in their language signifies a Bottom. I thought fitt to leave this Memorandum to Posterity & refer them to Lhuyds Dictionary in ye oldest Court Roll I have which was ye 16 year of King Henry ye Sixth I find it entered Appuldurcombe as above & likewise in some of ye old ones since but they often varyed in ye spelling of it not knowing from whence it was derived." Signed "Rob. Worsley, 1720". Also annotated are, from l to r: "Bowling Green, Great Dining Room with library over it this was formerly a tennis court, Staircase, Parlour, Hall, Hall, Chapell, Stables

=== 1702: Baroque mansion ===
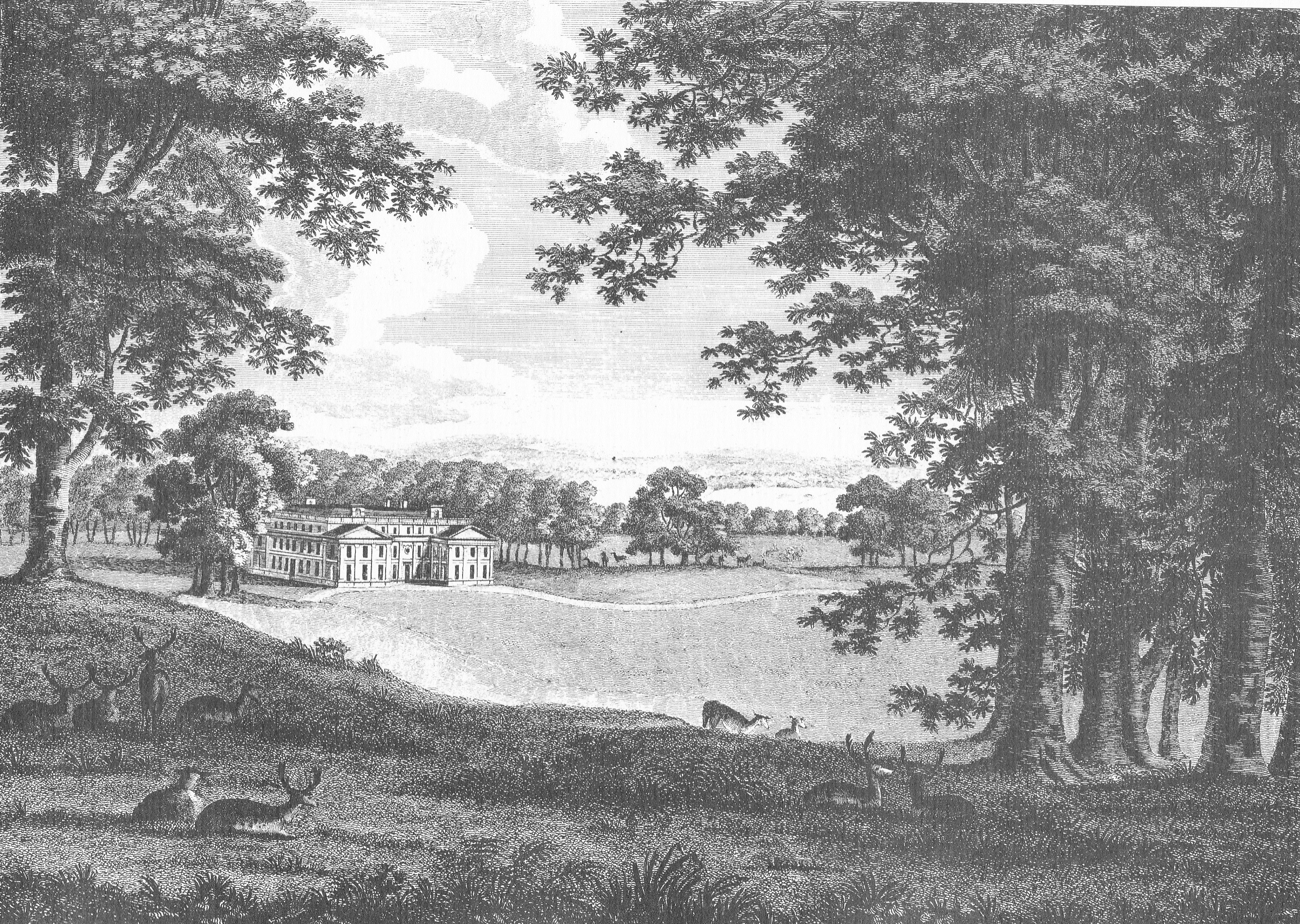
"Appuldurcombe Park, the seat of the Right Honourable Sir Richard Worsley Baronet, Governor and Vice-Admiral of the Isle of Wight". Engraving published in: Worsley, Sir Richard, History of the Isle of Wight, London, 1781

The present house was begun in 1702. The architect was John James. Sir Robert never saw the house fully completed. He died on 29 July 1747; in his memory a monument was erected overlooking the house on Stenbury Down.

The house was greatly extended in the 1770s by his great-nephew Sir Richard Worsley, 7th Baronet Worsley of Appuldurcombe. The newly extended mansion was where Sir Richard brought his new wife, the 17-year-old Seymour Fleming, whom he married "for love and £80,000". Capability Brown was commissioned in 1779 to design the ornamental grounds at the same time as the extensions. A romantic ruined folly known as "Cooke’s Castle" was built on the hill opposite to improve the view. During Sir Richard's time, the house held a magnificent art collection and was the setting for Sir Richard's entertaining of some of the most eminent figures of the age.

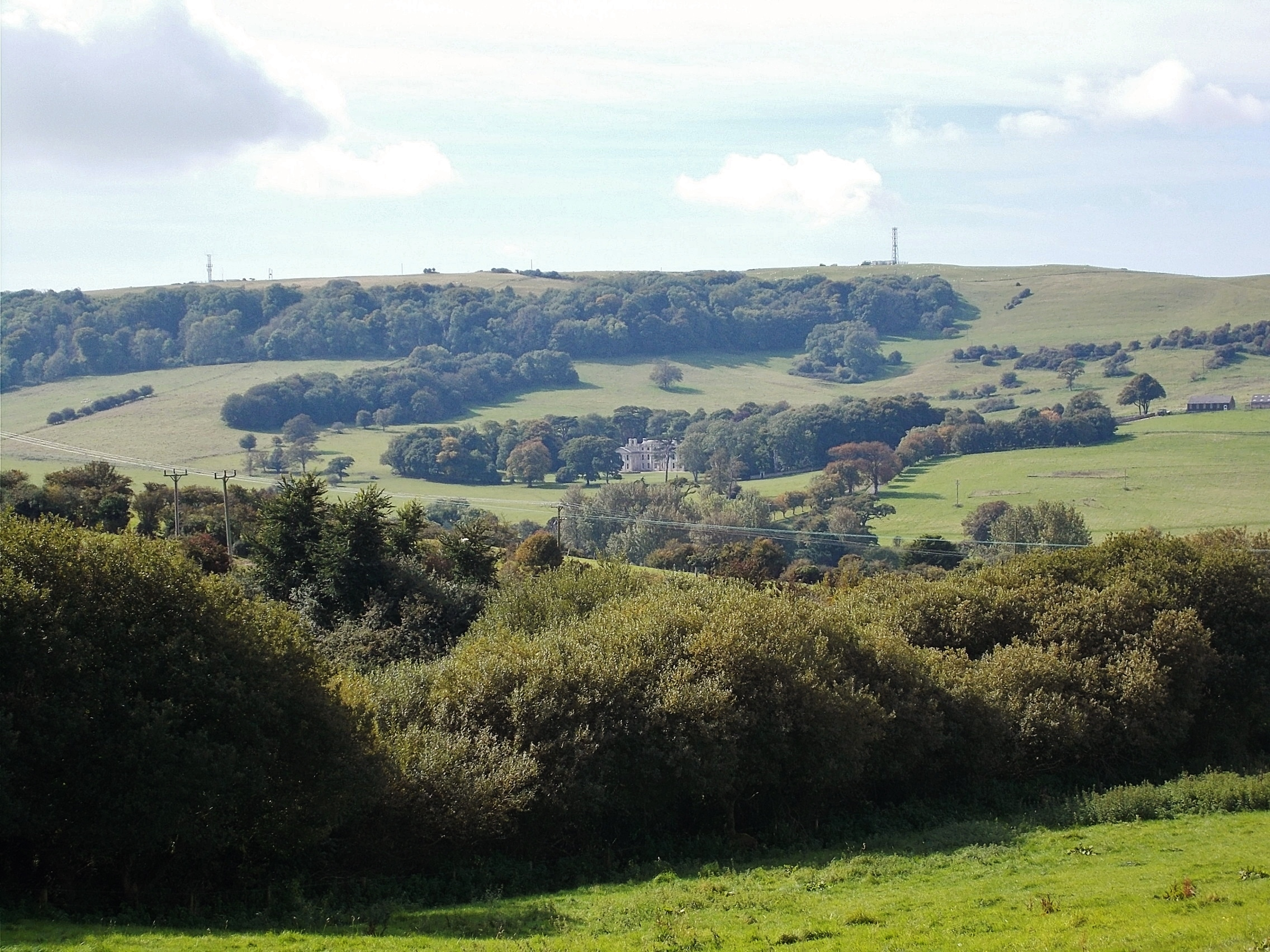
The setting of the house within the South Wight countryside. The house is at the centre of the picture.

Sir Richard's marriage quickly fell apart, and the couple's only child, a son, died in infancy. After he sued one of his wife's rumoured 27 lovers, the couple informally separated. Seymour could not remarry until Richard's death, and she became a professional mistress or demimondaine, living off the donations of rich men in order to survive, joining other upper-class women in a similar position in the New Female Coterie. Sir Richard died of apoplexy on 8 August 1805 at Appuldurcombe, and was buried at the parish church at Godshill. His title passed to his fourth cousin, Henry Worsley-Holmes, whilst his wife's £70,000 jointure (equivalent to £5,220,000 in 2025) reverted to her, and just over a month later she remarried.

Worsley had left the estate saddled with heavy debts, but Appuldurcombe passed to his niece, Henrietta Anna Maria Charlotte (daughter of John Bridgeman Simpson). She married the Hon. Charles Anderson-Pelham, later first Earl of Yarborough, in 1806. The founder of the Royal Yacht Squadron at Cowes, he made few changes to the house and was quite happy to retain the property as a convenient base for his sailing activities.

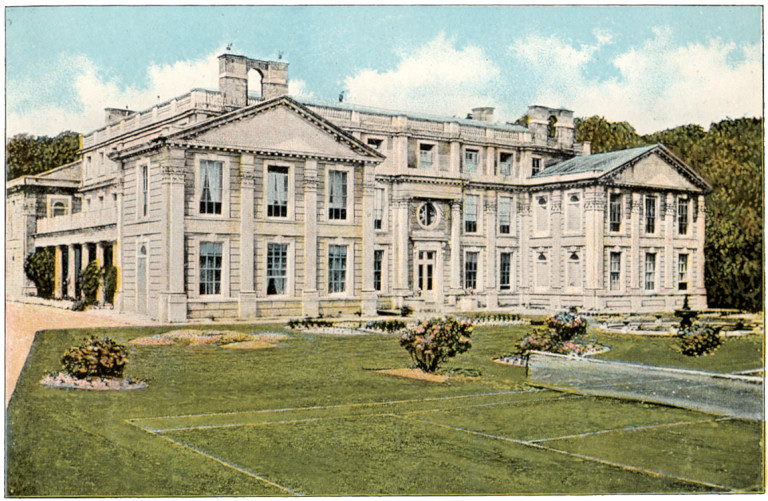
Appuldurcombe House circa 1910

In 1855 the estate was sold. An unsuccessful business venture ran Appuldurcombe as a hotel, but with its failure, the house was then leased as Dr Pound's Academy for young gentlemen.

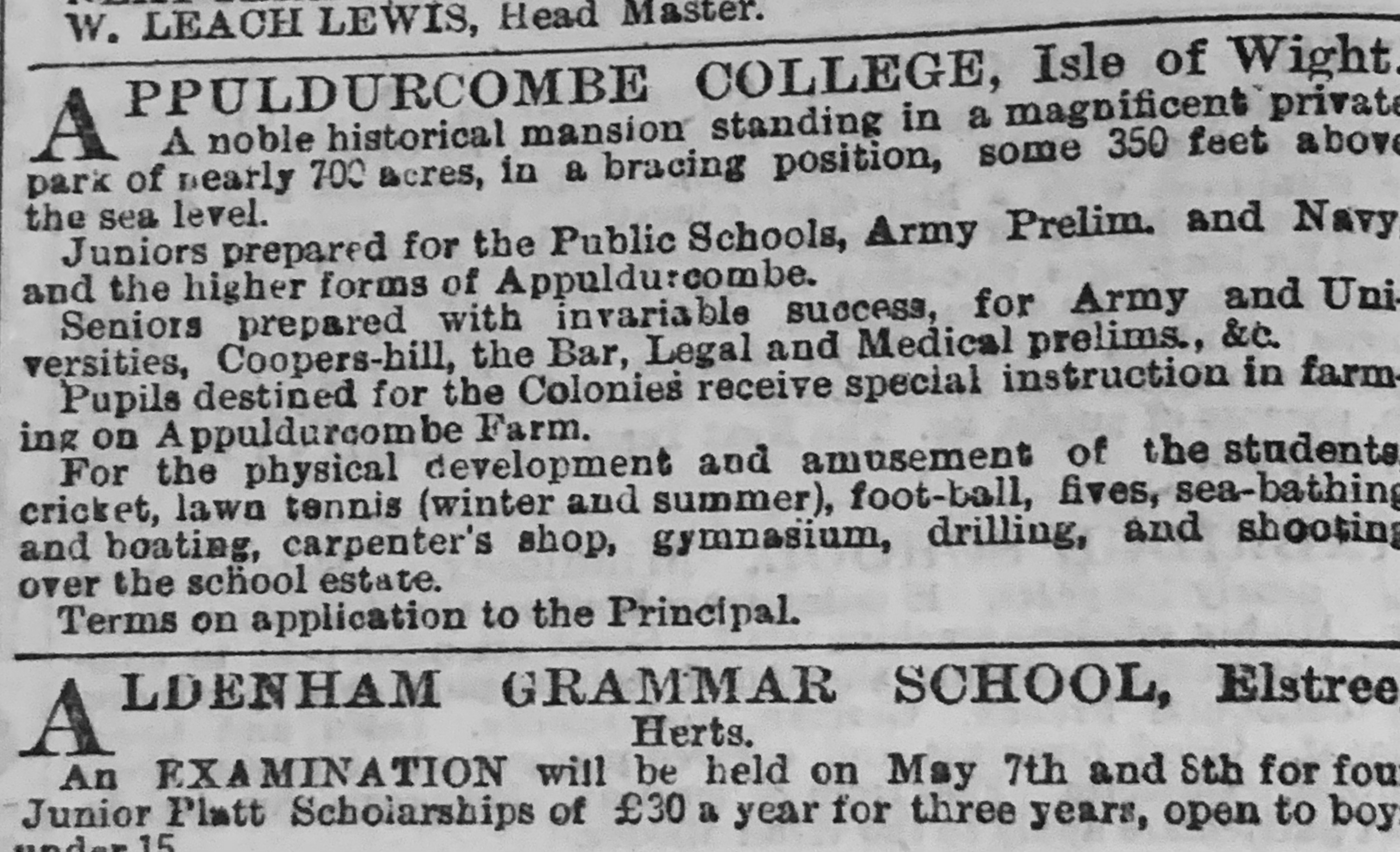
Advertisement for Appuldurcombe College in the Times, London, 19 April 1889

The house was inhabited in 1901–1907 by a hundred Benedictine monks who had been exiled from Solesmes Abbey in France and were shortly to settle at Quarr Abbey on the Isle of Wight.

=== Second World War: damage ===
Troops were billeted in the house during both world wars, and at the onset of the Second World War the house was taken over by the military. On 7 February 1943, a German Luftwaffe Dornier Do 217 that was engaged in a mine-laying mission turned inland and dropped its final mine very close to the house, before crashing into St Martin's Down. The mine exploded, blowing in windows and causing the collapse of part of the roof. The resulting hole in the roof was left unrepaired, and after the war much of the remainder of the roof and the interiors were removed and sold off.

== Present ==
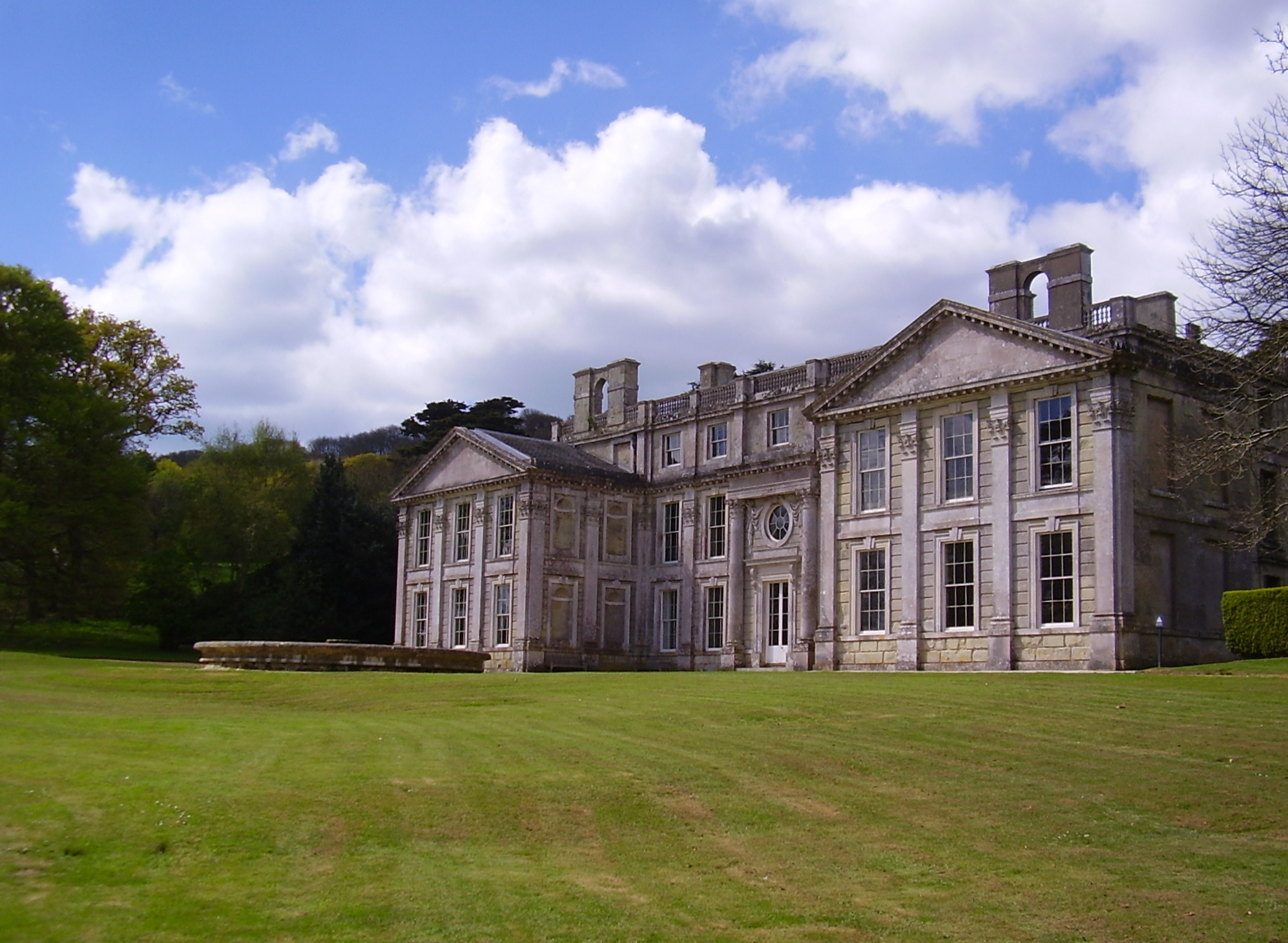
View from the northeast

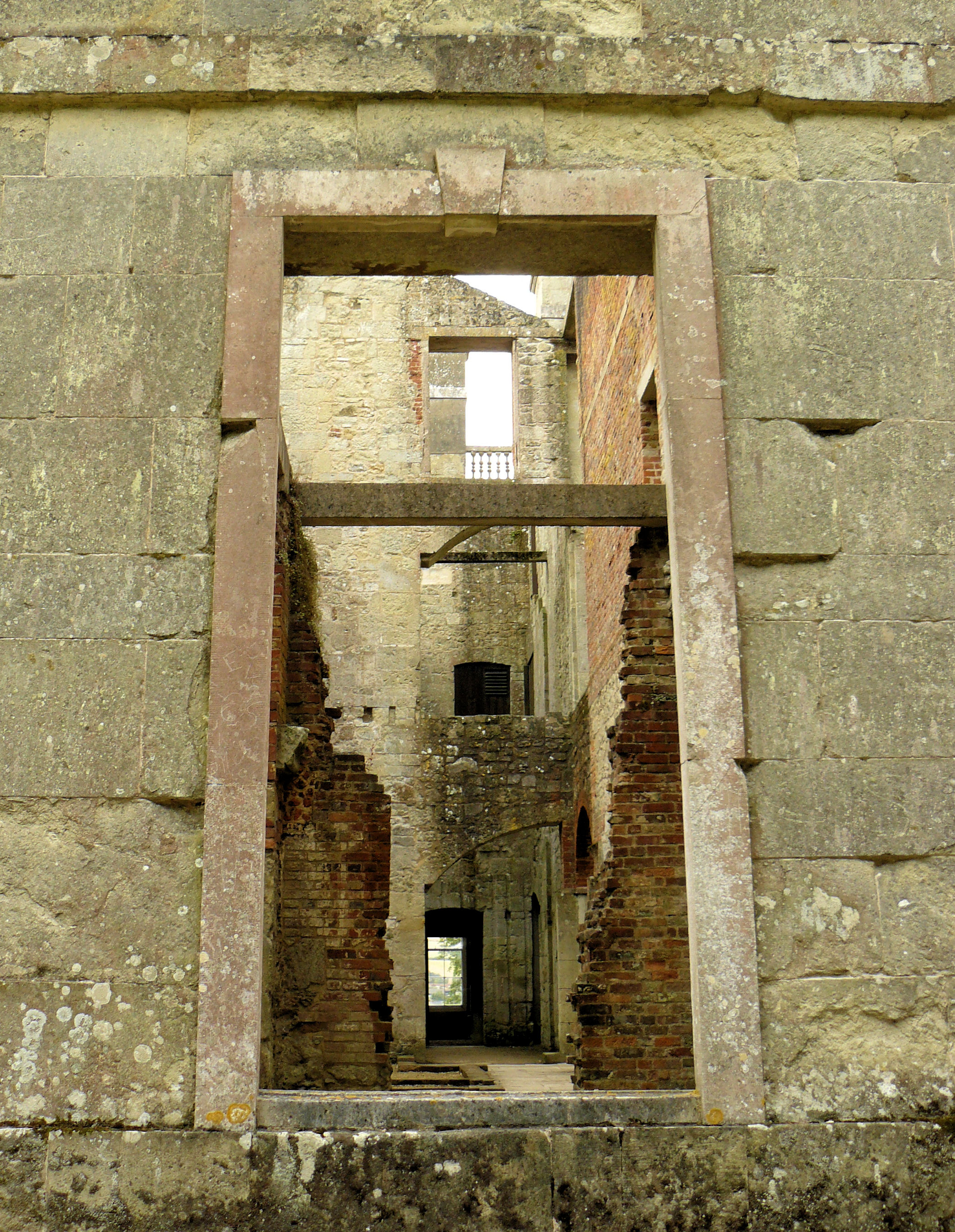
The ruined interior of Appuldurcombe House

Although the house is now mainly a shell, its front section has been re-roofed and glazed, and a small part of the interior recreated. The house has become well known as one of the supposedly most haunted places on the island. There are frequent tales and claimed sightings of ghosts, phantoms and other supernatural phenomena. During the summer holidays, weekly ghost walks are held at Appuldurcombe every Thursday evening.

As of January 2016, Appuldurcombe House and surrounding estate are for sale for £4.75 million.
