= Worsley baronets =

Set index for Worsley baronets

There have been two baronetcies created for the Worsley family, one in the Baronetage of England and one in the Baronetage of the United Kingdom.

- Worsley baronets of Appuldurcombe (1611)
- Worsley baronets of Hovingham Hall (1838)
