= Henry Mildmay (of Graces) =

English politician

Henry Mildmay (25 November 1619 – 3 December 1692) was an English politician who sat in the House of Commons at various times between 1654 and 1692. He fought in the Parliamentary army in the English Civil War.

== Biography ==
Mildmay was the eldest son of Sir Henry Mildmay of Graces, Little Baddow and his second wife Amy Gurdon, daughter of Brampton Gurdon of Assington, Suffolk. He was educated at Felsted School under Martin Holbeach and entered Gray's Inn in 1632. His father died in 1639 and he succeeded to the estate at Little Baddow. He was captain of horse in the Parliamentary army in 1642 and was a colonel in 1643. Also in 1643 he was commissioner for levying money for Essex, commissioner for defence for the eastern association and commissioner for execution of ordinances. He was commissioner for militia for Middlesex in 1644 and commissioner for assessment for Essex from 1644 to 1652. In 1645 he was commissioner for new model ordinance for Essex 1645, commissioner for defence for Ely 1645, governor of Cambridge Castle and became J.P. for until July 1660.In 1648 he was commissioner for militia for Essex. He was commissioner for assessment for Shropshire from 1650 to 1652 and JP for Shropshire from 1650 to 1653.

In 1654, Mildmay was elected Member of Parliament for Essex in the First Protectorate Parliament. He was also commissioner for scandalous ministers for Essex in 1654. In 1656 he was re-elected MP for Essex in the Second Protectorate Parliament . He was commissioner for assessment for Essex in 1657. In 1659 he was elected MP for Maldon in the Third Protectorate Parliament. He was also commissioner for militia for Essex in 1659. In January 1660 he was commissioner for assessment for Essex and in March 1660 he was commissioner for militia for Essex and Middlesex. In April 1660 he was re-elected MP for Maldon in the Convention Parliament when he was involved in a double return but was allowed to take his seat. He was commissioner for assessment for Middlesex from August 1660 to 1663. He did not stand for the Cavalier Parliament at a time when his kinsman Henry Mildmay was in disgrace. He became JP for Essex in 1664 but in 1672 he was found to have plotted false accusations against his enemy John Bramston and was turned out of all commissions. In 1679 he was returned as MP for Essex in both elections, and was re-elected in 1681, 1689 and 1690. He was restored as JP for Essex in April 1688 and was commissioner for assessment for Essex from 1689 to 1690.

Mildmay died at the age of 83 and was buried at Little Baddow.

== Family ==
Mildmay married firstly Cicely Barker, daughter of Walter Barker of Haughmond, Shropshire, and had two daughters. He married secondly Mary Mildmay daughter of Robert Mildmay of Overton, Northamptonshire on 30 June 1657 and had four sons and five daughters. The eldest daughter Mary (1660–1724) married Charles Goodwin, owner of Rowfant in Sussex.

== Notes ==
Parliament of England
Preceded by Joachim Matthews; Henry Barrington; John Brewster; Christopher Earl; Dudley Templer	Member of Parliament for Essex; 1654–1656; With: Sir William Masham Bt 1654; Richard Cutts 1654; Herbert Pelham 1654; Sir Richard Everard, 1st Baronet of Much Waltham 1654 1656; Sir Thomas Honywood 1654 1656; Sir Thomas Bowes 1654 1656; Thomas Coke (of Pebmarsh) 1654; Carew Mildmay 1654 1656; Dionysius Wakering 1654 1656; Edward Turnor 1654 1656; Oliver Raymond 1654 1656; Sir Harbottle Grimston 1656; Robert Barrington 1656; Dudley Temple 1656; Hezekiah Haynes 1656; John Archer 1656	Succeeded by Lord Rich; Edward Turnor
Preceded by Colonel Joachim Matthews	Member of Parliament for Maldon; 1659; With: Colonel Joachim Matthews	Succeeded by Tristram Conyers; Henry Mildmay
