= Dionysius Wakering =

Dionysius Wakering (born 1617) was an English lawyer and politician who sat in the House of Commons from 1654 to 1656.

Wakering was born at Kelvedon, Essex, the son of John Wakering, of Lincoln's Inn and of Kelvedon and his wife Mary Palmer daughter of Dionis Palmer. He was at school at Kelvedon under Mr White and was admitted at Christ's College, Cambridge on 14 May 1633 at the age of 15. He was admitted at Lincoln's Inn on 6 March 1634 and called to the bar in 1641.

In 1654, Wakering was elected Member of Parliament for Essex in the First Protectorate Parliament. He was re-elected MP for Essex in the Second Protectorate Parliament.

Parliament of England
Preceded by Joachim Matthews; Henry Barrington; John Brewster; Christopher Earl; Dudley Templer	Member of Parliament for Essex; 1654–1656; With: Sir William Masham Bt 1654; Richard Cutts 1654; Herbert Pelham 1654; Sir Henry Mildmay 1654–1656; Sir Thomas Honywood 1654–1656; Sir Thomas Bowes 1654–1656; Thomas Coke (of Pebmarsh) 1654; Sir Richard Everard, 1st Baronet of Much Waltham 1654–1656; Carew Mildmay 1654–1656; Edward Turnor 1654–1656; Oliver Raymond 1654–1656; Sir Harbottle Grimston 1656; Robert Barrington 1656; Dudley Temple 1656; Hezekiah Haynes 1656; John Archer 1656	Succeeded by Lord Rich; Edward Turnor
