= Sir Richard Everard, 1st Baronet, of Much Waltham =

English politician

Sir Richard Everard, 1st Baronet (died 1680) was an English politician who sat in the House of Commons in 1654 and 1656.

Everard was the son of Hugh Everard of Great Waltham, Essex, and his wife Mary Brand daughter of Thomas Brand or Bond of Great Hormead, Hertfordshire. He matriculated from Jesus College, Cambridge at Easter 1617 and was admitted at Lincoln's Inn on 10 June 1619. He was created a baronet, of Much Waltham on 29 January 1629. In 1644 he became High Sheriff of Essex.

In 1654, Everard was elected Member of Parliament for Essex in the First Protectorate Parliament. He was re-elected MP for Essex in the Second Protectorate Parliament.

Everard married Joan Barrington, daughter of Sir Francis Barrington, 1st Baronet. He was succeeded in the baronetcy by his son Richard and then his grandson Hugh.

Parliament of England
Preceded by Joachim Matthews; Henry Barrington; John Brewster; Christopher Earl; Dudley Templer	Member of Parliament for Essex; 1654–1656; With: Sir William Masham Bt 1654; Richard Cutts 1654; Herbert Pelham 1654; Sir Henry Mildmay 1654–1656; Sir Thomas Honywood 1654–1656; Sir Thomas Bowes 1654–1656; Thomas Coke (of Pebmarsh) 1654; Carew Mildmay 1654–1656; Dionysius Wakering 1654–1656; Edward Turnor 1654–1656; Oliver Raymond 1654–1656; Sir Harbottle Grimston 1656; Robert Barrington 1656; Dudley Temple 1656; Hezekiah Haynes 1656; John Archer 1656	Succeeded by Lord Rich; Edward Turnor
Baronetage of England
New creation	Baronet (of Much Waltham); 1629–1680	Succeeded by Richard Everard
