= Thomas Honywood (Essex MP) =

English soldier and Member of Parliament

Sir Thomas Honywood (15 January 1586 – 26 May 1666) was an English soldier during the English Civil War and later a Member of Parliament and also called to Parliament as Thomas, Lord Honywood. He was seated at Marks Hall, Essex.

== Life ==
The eldest son of Robert Honywood and grandson of Mary Honywood, Honywood was born at Betchworth Castle, Surrey. He was the half-brother of Sir Robert Honywood. He was the head of a prominent Essex family and knighted on 22 November 1632.

On the outbreak of the Civil War he declared for the parliamentary side, and was one of the Committee for Essex in 1648. In the same year, under the command of Thomas Fairfax, he led the Essex forces at the Siege of Colchester. In 1649, he was one of those named in the commission to try the King, but did not serve on the court. He also led a regiment at the Battle of Worcester in 1651. He was created D.C.L. at Oxford University on 9 September 1651.

== In Parliament ==
Sir Thomas was elected to Parliament as member for Essex in the First and Second Parliaments of the Protectorate, and in 1658 was raised to Cromwell's new Upper House. However, he was distrusted by the hardline Puritans and considered "rather soft in his spirit". He retired from public life after the Restoration.

== Private life ==
He married Hester Manning (d.1681) daughter of London merchant John La Motte, on 13 May 1634 at All Hallows, London Wall, London and the widow of London merchant John Manning (d.1634). He was succeeded by their son John Lamotte Honywood; their daughter Elizabeth Honywood married Sir John Cotton. He died at his son-in-law's home, Cotton House, in Westminster.

== Sources ==
- Concise Dictionary of National Biography (1930)
- R. C. Latham & W. Matthews, The Diary of Samuel Pepys, Volume X - Companion (London: HarperCollins, 1995)
- Mark Noble, Memoirs of several persons and families... allied to or descended from... the Protectorate-House of Cromwell (Birmingham: Pearson & Rollason, 1784)

Parliament of England
Preceded by Joachim Matthews; Henry Barrington; John Brewster; Christopher Earl; Dudley Templer	Member of Parliament for Essex; 1654–1656; With: Sir William Masham Bt 1654; Richard Cutts 1654; Herbert Pelham 1654; Sir Henry Mildmay 1654–1656; Carew Mildmay 1654–1656; Sir Thomas Bowes 1654–1656; Thomas Coke (of Pebmarsh) 1654; Sir Richard Everard, 1st Baronet of Much Waltham 1654–1656; Dionysius Wakering 1654–1656; Edward Turnor 1654–1656; Oliver Raymond 1654–1656; Sir Harbottle Grimston 1656; Robert Barrington 1656; Dudley Temple 1656; Hezekiah Haynes 1656; John Archer 1656	Succeeded by Lord Rich; Edward Turnor
