= William Harris (Tudor person) =

English landowner in the 16th Century

Sir William Harris
- Born: 21 September 1556; Woodham Mortimer, Southminster, Creeksea, Essex
- Died: 14 November 1616 (aged 60); Creeksea, Essex
- Resting place: All Saints' Church
- Occupations: English knight, subscriber of the Virginia Company, and landowner
- Known for: Incorporator in the Virginia Company of London
- Title: High Sheriff
- Predecessor: Sir Arthur Harris
- Spouse: Alice Smythe (m. 1583; died 1615)
- Children: Sir Arthur, William, Thomas, John, Alice, Frances, Elizabeth, Mary
- Parent(s): Sir Arthur Harris and Dorothy Waldegrave

Sir William Harris (21 September 1556 – 14 November 1616) was an English knight, land owner, and a notable incorporator in the third Virginia Company of London.

This Harris family appears to have originated some 40 to 50 miles (64 to 80 km) east-north-east of London and on the north bank of the River Crouch. The village of Cricksea (or Creeksea) exists today on this peninsula in Essex County. Creeksea is located about 2 miles (3 km) west of Burnham-on-the-Crouch and about 18 miles (29 km) inland from the North Sea. Anciently called "Danes Island," this area was inhabited largely by Norman families after the conquest in 1066.

Sir William Harris was knighted on 23 July 1603 at Whitehall on the eve of the coronation of James I. His elevation to the knighthood was the result of military service in Ireland during the Nine Years' War along with his cousin Sir William Harris of Shenfield, Essex.

== Family life ==
William Harris was born on 21 September 1556 in Essex. His parents were Sir Arthur Harris and Dorothy Waldegrave. He made his home at Creeksea Place Manor

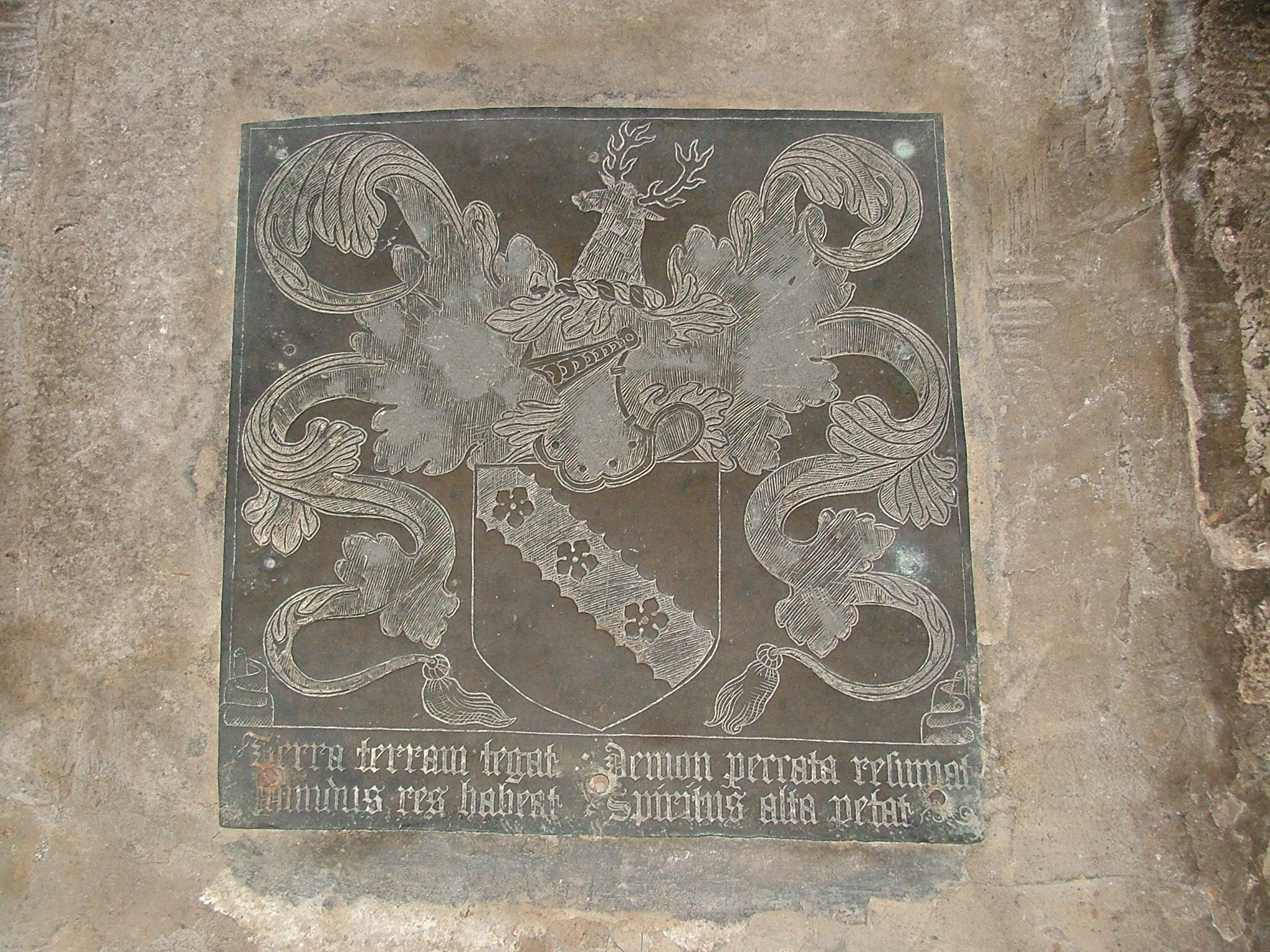
Harris Arms of William's grandfather and namesake, presumed to be similar or the same as Sir William's

William married Alice Smythe on 6 May 1583 in St Gabriel Fenchurch, London, England. Alice was the daughter of Thomas Smythe of Westenhanger, Kent.

The children of Sir William Harris and Lady Alice Harris were:

Sir Arthur Harris b 1584....d 9 Jan 1632
William Harris b 1585....d 1622 in Lincolns Inn, Middlesex.
Thomas Harris b 1586....d 1617 in England, unmarried and without issue
John Harris b 1588....d by 14 Oct 1638 in Charles City County, Virginia.
Alice Harris married Sir Henry Mildmay
Frances Harris married Mr. Roope
Elizabeth Harris
Mary Harris married Gyles Browne

== Virginia Company ==
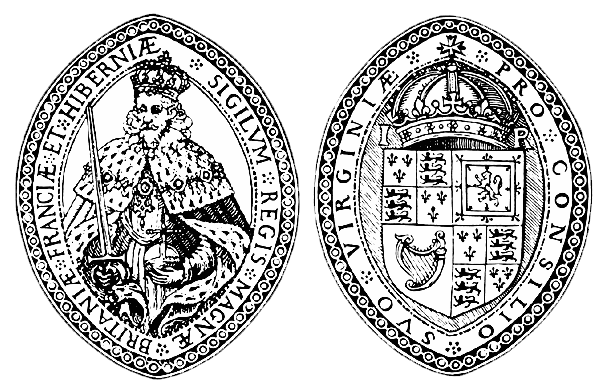
Obverse and Reverse of the Seal of the Virginia Company

Sir William Harris, his brother in law, Sir Thomas Smythe and his son, Sir Arthur Harris, each, were Incorporators and Subscribers to the third charter of the Virginia Company of London, and each paid £75 as their subscription. Both Harris and Smythe were very interested in the development of Virginia. They exerted their influence to secure money, men, equipment, supplies, and ships for the colonization efforts.

Lady Alice died 10 November 1615 and Sir William on 14 November 1616. Both are buried at All Saints' Church in Creeksea. All Saints still displays a depiction of Sir William and his sword, a rapier, which was found in Creeksea Place and given to the church.

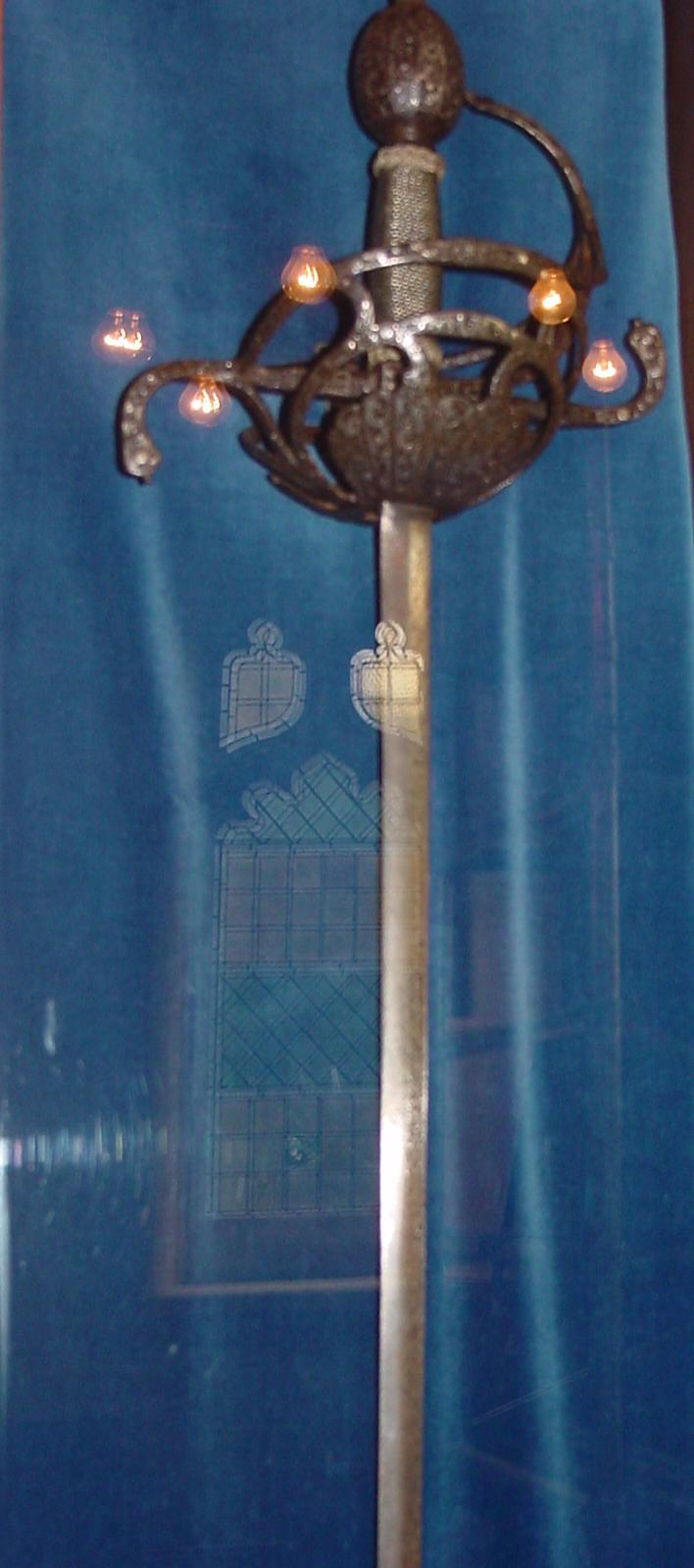
Rapier of Sir William Harris held in All Saints' Church

== Sources ==
- Bindoff, S. T. (1982), The House of Commons 1509-1558, vol. I, London: Secker & Warburg
- Boddie, John Bennett (1954), Virginia Historical Genealogies, Redwood City, California: Pacific coast Publishers
- Brown, Alexander (1890), The Genesis of the United States, New York, NY: Houghton Mifflin & Co.
- Browning, Charles H. (1891), Americans of Royal Descent: Genealogies Showing the Lineal Descent from Kings of Some American Families, Philadelphia: Porter & Coates
- Burke, Sir Bernard (1864), Royal Descents and Pedigrees of Founders' Kin, London: Harrison
- Hale, Will Thomas & Merritt, Dixon Lanier (1913), A History of Tennessee and Tennesseans: The Leaders and Representative Men in Commerce, Industry and Modern Activities, vol. VI, Chicago and New York: The Lewis Publishing Company
- Harris, Robert E. (1994), From Essex England to the Sunny Southern USA: A Harris Family Journey, Atlanta, GA: Genealogy Press
- Harris, Francis Gray (2006), Harris: From Essex, England and Allied Families, vol. II, Ashland, OH: Atlas Books, ISBN 0-9774139-0-X
- McRae, Eleanor Harris (1954), The Harris Family of Prince Edward County, Virginia, Virginia Beach, VA: Family Values Publications
- Metcalfe, Walter C. (1878), The Visitations of Essex by Hawley 1552; Hervy 1558; Cooke 1570; Raven 1612; and Owend and Lilly 1634., London: Mitchell and Hughes
- The Virginia Company of London, 1606-1624, by Wesley Frank Craven, published by University Press of Virginia, 1957, Charlottesville, Virginia. ISBN 0-8063-4555-1
