= Oliver Raymond =

English politician

Oliver Raymond (c.1605 – 1679) was an English politician who sat in the House of Commons in 1654 and 1656.

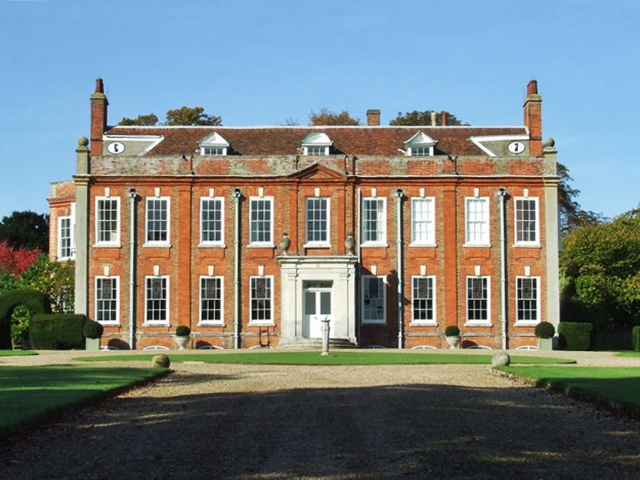
Belchamp Hall as rebuilt c.1720

Raymond was born at Belchamp Walter, the son of John Raymond, who bought Belchamp Hall in 1611. He was admitted at Trinity College, Cambridge in 1622 and migrated to Christ's College, Cambridge. He was admitted at Lincoln's Inn on 11 February 1626 and called to the bar in 1633. He was elder for Essex Classis in 1647.

In 1654, Raymond was elected Member of Parliament for Essex in the First Protectorate Parliament. He was re-elected MP for Essex in 1656 for the Second Protectorate Parliament.

Raymond died in 1679 and was buried at Belchamp Walter. He had married Frances Herries, daughter of Sir William Herries (or Harris) of Shenfield, Essex. he disinherited his eldest son for marrying without his approval and Belchamp Hall passed instead to the latter's eldest son John Raymond (died 1690).

Parliament of England
Preceded by Joachim Matthews; Henry Barrington; John Brewster; Christopher Earl; Dudley Templer	Member of Parliament for Essex; 1654–1656; With: Sir William Masham Bt 1654; Richard Cutts 1654; Herbert Pelham 1654; Sir Henry Mildmay 1654–1656; Sir Thomas Honywood 1654–1656; Sir Thomas Bowes 1654–1656; Thomas Coke (of Pebmarsh) 1654; Sir Richard Everard, 1st Baronet of Much Waltham 1654–1656; Carew Mildmay 1654–1656; Edward Turnor 1654–1656; Dionysius Wakering 1654–1656; Sir Harbottle Grimston 1656; Robert Barrington 1656; Dudley Temple 1656; Hezekiah Haynes 1656; John Archer 1656	Succeeded by Lord Rich; Edward Turnor
