= Henry Pelham (civil servant) =

British civil servant (1876–1949)

Sir Henry Pelham KCB
- Sir Henry Pelham, by Walter Stoneman, 1933

Permanent Secretary at the Board of Education
- In office 1931–1937

Personal details
- Born: Edward Henry Pelham; 20 December 1876 North Oxford, Oxfordshire, England
- Died: 18 December 1949 (aged 72) Oxford, Oxfordshire, England
- Spouse: Hon. Irene Lubbock (m. 1905)
- Parent: Henry Francis Pelham (father)
- Relatives: Bishop John Pelham (grandfather); Sir Edward Buxton, 2nd Baronet (grandfather); Baron Avebury (father-in-law)
- Education: Harrow School
- Alma mater: Balliol College, Oxford
- Occupation: Civil servant

Sir Edward Henry Pelham KCB (20 December 1876 – 18 December 1949) was a British civil servant who was Permanent Secretary at the Board of Education between 1931 and 1937.

== Early life and education ==
Pelham was born at 20 Bradmore Road in North Oxford, the eldest son of classical scholar Henry Francis Pelham, President of Trinity College, Oxford, and Laura Priscilla Buxton, daughter of Sir Edward Buxton, 2nd Baronet. His grandfather was Bishop of Norwich Hon. John Thomas Pelham, third son of the 3rd Earl of Chichester, whose father, the 2nd Earl, was a first cousin of Prime Ministers Henry Pelham and Thomas Pelham-Holles, 1st Duke of Newcastle. His younger brother was Bishop of Barrow-in-Furness Herbert Pelham.

He was educated at Harrow School and Balliol College, Oxford.

== Career ==
At age 24, Pelham joined the Board of Education and steadily advanced. In 1920, he was appointed Principal Assistant Secretary. Nine years later, he was promoted to Deputy Secretary. He served as Permanent Secretary from 1931 to his retirement in 1937.

He was appointed a Companion of the Order of the Bath (CB) in the 1921 New Year Honours and promoted to Knight Commander in the same order (KCB) in the 1933 New Year Honours.

== Personal life ==
In 1905, Pelham married Hon. Irene Lubbock, fifth and youngest daughter of John Lubbock, 1st Baron Avebury and Alice Augusta Laurentius Lane-Fox, daughter of Augustus Pitt Rivers. They had two sons and three daughters:

- Henry John Pelham (28 July 1907 – 28 May 1939), married Althea Muriel Beavan, daughter of James Riley Beavan
- Alice Catherine Pelham (20 May 1911 – 19 June 1987), married Patrick Robert Sandars OBE, son of Rev Canon George Russell Sandars
- Irene Joan Pelham (19 December 1912 – 1 May 2002), married Brig. Maurice Leslie Hayne CBE, son of Frederick Underwood Stokes Hayne
- Maj. Eric Thomas Pelham (19 August 1915 – 8 January 1984), married Barbara Hilda Fordham, daughter of Henry John Fordham Hayne
- Susan Pelham (30 July 1918 – 8 May 2006), married Air Vice Marshall Cresswell Clementi CB CBE, son of Sir Cecil Clementi GCMG. They were the parents of David Clementi.

He died in 1949 in Oxford as a result of an accident, two days before his 73rd birthday. Lady Pelham died in 1961, aged 74.

Government offices
Preceded by Sir Aubrey Symonds	Permanent Secretary of the Board of Education; 1931–1937	Succeeded by Sir Maurice Holmes
