= Carew Mildmay =

English politician

Carew Hervey Mildmay (2 February 1596 – 1676) was an English politician who sat in the House of Commons in 1654 and 1656. He fought in the Parliamentary army in the English Civil War.

Mildmay was the second son of William Mildmay, of Moulsham, Essex. He was admitted at Emmanuel College, Cambridge in 1614 and admitted at the Inner Temple in 1616. He was adopted as heir to his uncle Sir Gawen Hervey in 1622 and was directed to take the name of Hervey before Mildmay, this practice being followed thereafter by his family. As a result he inherited the manor house at Marks and became Carew Mildmay of Marks where he lived during the Civil War when he commanded a Parliamentary regiment. At one stage Marks was besieged by royalist forces and he only escaped capture by swimming the moat. He also purchased an interest in part of the park that had been associated with the Royal Palace at Havering when that was broken up and disposed in 1652.

He was appointed Groom of his Majesty's Jewels and Plate on 5 May 1605; his relation Henry Mildmay was Master of the Jewel House. Following the execution of Charles I in 1649, parliament ordered that the coronation regalia 'be totally broken, and that they melt down all the gold and silver and sell all the jewels to the best advantage of the Commonwealth.' Henry Mildmay stayed away, but his nephew returned the instructions 'not obeyed', for which action he was jailed at Fleet Prison. Nonetheless, an inventory and valuation was taken, and the reglia was broken up and sold or turned into coinage.

In 1654, he was elected Member of Parliament for Essex in the First Protectorate Parliament. He was re-elected MP for Essex in the Second Protectorate Parliament. After the Restoration he successfully pleaded to return to his post in the Jewel House.

Mildmay was of Marks, Romford, Essex. He died at the age of 80 and was buried at Romford on 8 August 1676. He had married Dorothy Gerard, sister of Sir Gilbert Gerard, 1st Baronet of Harrow on the Hill.

Parliament of England
Preceded by Joachim Matthews; Henry Barrington; John Brewster; Christopher Earl; Dudley Templer	Member of Parliament for Essex; 1654–1656; With: Sir William Masham Bt 1654; Richard Cutts 1654; Herbert Pelham 1654; Sir Henry Mildmay 1654–1656; Sir Thomas Honywood 1654–1656; Sir Thomas Bowes 1654–1656; Thomas Coke (of Pebmarsh) 1654; Sir Richard Everard, 1st Baronet of Much Waltham 1654–1656; Dionysius Wakering 1654–1656; Edward Turnor 1654–1656; Oliver Raymond 1654–1656; Sir Harbottle Grimston 1656; Robert Barrington 1656; Dudley Temple 1656; Hezekiah Haynes 1656; John Archer 1656	Succeeded by Lord Rich; Edward Turnor
