= Charles Goodwin =

Charles Goodwin may refer to:

- Tod Goodwin (Charles R. Goodwin, 1911–1997), American football player
- Charles Barnes Goodwin (born 1970), American judge
- Charles Wycliffe Goodwin (1817–1878), British Egyptologist, bible scholar, lawyer and judge
- Charles Goodwin (of Rowfant) (1658–1731), English landowner
- Charles Goodwin (semiotician) (1943–2018), American linguistic anthropologist and semiotician
