= Arthur Harris (MP, died 1632) =

English politician (died 1632)

Sir Arthur Harris (died 9 January 1632) was an English politician who sat in the House of Commons at various times between 1624 and 1629.

Harris was the son of Sir William Harris, of Cricksey, Essex. He was admitted at Sidney Sussex College, Cambridge in February 1601. He was admitted at Gray's Inn on 20 November 1605 and possibly at Lincoln's Inn on 28 April 1607. He was of Cricksey and Woodham Mortimer, Essex, and was knighted on 15 July 1606.

In 1624, he was elected Member of Parliament for Maldon in the Happy Parliament. He was appointed High Sheriff of Essex for 1625–26. He was elected MP for both Maldon and Essex in 1625 and chose to sit for Essex. In 1628, he was elected MP for Maldon again and sat until 1629 when King Charles decided to rule without parliament for eleven years.

Harris died in 1632. He had married firstly Anne Cranmer, daughter of Robert Cranmer, of Kent and secondly Anne Salter, daughter of Sir Nicolas Salter, of Enfield, Middlesex. He had sons Cranmer, John, Thomas and Salter.

Parliament of England
Preceded by Sir Henry Mildmay; Sir Julius Caesar	Member of Parliament for Maldon; 1624–1625; With: Sir William Masham, 1st Baronet	Succeeded by Sir William Masham, 1st Baronet; Sir Henry Mildmay
Preceded by Sir Francis Barrington, 1st Baronet; Sir Thomas Cheek	Member of Parliament for Essex; 1625; With: Sir Francis Barrington, 1st Baronet	Succeeded by Sir Francis Barrington, 1st Baronet; Sir Harbottle Grimston
Preceded by Sir William Masham, Bt; Sir Thomas Cheek	Member of Parliament for Maldon; 1628–1629; With: Sir Henry Mildmay	Parliament suspended until 1640
