= Sir William Masham, 1st Baronet =

English politician

Sir William Masham, 1st Baronet (c. 1592 – c. 1656) was an English politician who sat in the House of Commons variously between 1624 and 1655.

== Life ==
Masham was the only son of William Masham of St Botolph without Aldgate, London and educated at Magdalen College, Oxford (1607) and the Inner Temple (1610).

Masham was created baronet on 20 December 1621. He was elected Member of Parliament for Maldon in 1624, 1625 and 1626 and for Colchester in place of Edward Alford in 1628 after a petition.

In April 1640, Masham was elected MP for Colchester in the Short Parliament and then for Essex in November 1640 for the Long Parliament. He was re-elected MP for Essex in 1654 for the First Protectorate Parliament.

He married Elizabeth, the daughter of Joan and Sir Francis Barrington of Hatfield Broad Oak, Essex, and the widow of Sir James Altham of Mark Hall, Latton, Essex. They had three sons (of whom at least one predeceased him) and a daughter.

Parliament of England
| Preceded by Julius Caesar; Henry Mildmay | Member of Parliament for Maldon; 1624–1626; With: Sir Arthur Harris 1624; Sir Henry Mildmay 1625; Sir Thomas Cheek 1626 | Succeeded by Sir Henry Mildmay; Sir Arthur Harris |
| Parliament suspended since 1629 | Member of Parliament for Colchester; Apr 1640; With: Sir Harbottle Grimston | Succeeded by Sir Harbottle Grimston; Sir Thomas Barrington, Bt |
| Preceded by Sir Thomas Barrington; Sir Harbottle Grimston | Member of Parliament for Essex; 1640–1653; With: Lord Rich 1640–1641; Sir Martin Lumley 1641–1648 | Succeeded by Joachim Matthews; Henry Barrington; John Brewster; Christopher Earl; Dudley Templer |
| Preceded by Joachim Matthews; Henry Barrington; John Brewster; Christopher Earl; Dudley Templer | Member of Parliament for Essex; 1654; With: Sir Richard Everard, Bt; Sir Thomas Honywood; Sir Thomas Bowes; Sir Henry Mildmay (of Graces); Thomas Coke (of Pebmarsh); Carew Mildmay; Dionysius Wakering; Edward Turnor; Richard Cutts; Oliver Raymond; Herbert Pelham | Succeeded by Sir Harbottle Grimston; Sir Richard Everard, Bt; Sir Thomas Honywood; Sir Thomas Bowes; Sir Henry Mildmay of Graces; Robert Barrington; Carew Mildmay; Dionysius Wakering; Edward Turnor; Dudley Temple; Oliver Raymond; Hezekiah Haynes; John Archer |
Baronetage of England
| New creation | Baronet of Long Ashton; 1621 – c. 1656 | Succeeded by William Masham |
