= John Bramston the Younger =

English lawyer and politician (1611-1700)

Sir John Bramston, the younger (September 1611 – 4 February 1700), was an English lawyer and politician who sat in the House of Commons from 1660 to 1679. The son of Sir John Bramston, the elder and his first wife Bridget Moundeford, daughter of Thomas Moundeford, he was educated at Wadham College, Oxford, and called to bar at Middle Temple in 1635. In 1660 he was elected to the Convention Parliament for the county of Essex and again in the Cavalier Parliament of 1661 (a year he was also knighted (KB)). He frequently acted as chairman of committees of the whole House of Commons of England and was returned to parliament for Maldon in 1679 and 1685. He left an autobiography (published in 1845).

== Early life ==
Bramston, the son of Sir John Bramston and Bridget, daughter of Thomas Moundeford, M.D., of London, was born in September 1611, at Whitechapel, Middlesex, in a house which for several generations had been in possession of the family. His mother died at thirty-six; her son was devoted to her memory, although he was also fond of his stepmother Elizabeth Brabazon, who had been an early sweetheart of his father's. After attending Wadham College, Oxford, he entered the Middle Temple, where he had as chamber fellow Edward Hyde, afterwards Earl of Clarendon. Throughout his life, he continued on terms of intimate friendship with Hyde, who presented him with his portrait, the earliest of him now known to exist, and engraved for the edition of the "History of the Rebellion" published in 1816.

== Civil War and Interregnum ==
Bramston was called to the bar in 1635, and began to practise law with considerable success, until, in his own words, "the drums and trumpets blew his gown over his ears". He stood for parliament at the second general election of 1640 as a burgess for Bodmin in Cornwall, but failed to secure the seat in the Long Parliament. On his father's advice, he sold his chambers in the Temple at the outbreak of the Civil War, and he removed with his family to his father's house at Skreens. At his father's death in 1654 he succeeded to the property. After the dismissal of Richard Cromwell and George Moncks march to London, he served as Knight of the Shire for Essex in the Convention Parliament, and supported the motion for the Restoration.

== After the Restoration ==
On 23 April 1661, at the coronation of Charles II, Bramston was created a Knight of the Bath, after refusing a baronetcy on account of his dislike of hereditary honours.

The same year Bramston was re-elected MP for Essex in the Cavalier Parliament. Subsequently, he frequently acted as chairman of committees of the whole house. In 1672 an accusation was brought by Henry Mildmay (1619–1692), before the council against him and Francis, his younger brother, of being papists, and receiving payment from the pope to promote his interests. The chief witness was a Portuguese, Ferdinand de Macedo, whose evidence bore unmistakable signs of falsehood. Charles II is said to have remarked concerning the affair, that it was "the greatest conspiracy and greatest forgerie that ever he knew against a private gentleman".

Bramston was returned to Habeas Corpus Parliament of 1679 for the constituency of Maldon, but did not sit in the Exclusion Bill Parliament later the same year or in the Oxford Parliament that assembled for a week in 1681. He sat for Maldon in the first and only parliament of James II in 1685, but failed to secure a seat in a subsequent election.

After the Restoration between 1660 and 1688 Bramston was active in other public offices: he was a justice of the peace, deputy lieutenant and vice-admiral of Essex, high steward of Maldon, and a committee member for parliamentary tax assessment. He died 4 February 1700, leaving his estate to Anthony his third son and heir.

== Family ==
In 1635, (the year he was called to the bar) Bramston married Alice, eldest daughter of Anthony Abdy, alderman of London, and took a house in Charterhouse Yard. She predeceased him, dying in 1647. She was buried in Roxwell parish church close to her father-in-law, and on his death in 1700 he was buried near to them. They had six sons and four daughters although not all of them outlived their parents.

== Bibliography ==
The Autobiography of Sir John Bramston, preserved in the archives at Skreens, was published by the Camden Society in 1845. It begins with an account of his early years, and is continued to within a few weeks before his death. Thomas Henderson states in the DNB that "Although it casts no important light on historical events, it is of great interest as a record of the social and domestic life of the period".

== Notes ==
Parliament of England
| Preceded by Not represented in Restored Rump | Member of Parliament for Essex; 1660– 1679; With: Edward Turnor 1660; Sir Benjamin Ayloffe, 2nd Baronet 1661–1663; Banastre Maynard | Succeeded by Sir Eliab Harvey; Henry Mildmay |
