= Edmond Holmes =

British educationalist, writer, and poet

Edmond Gore Alexander Holmes (17 July 1850 – 14 October 1936) was an Anglo-Irish educationalist, writer and poet. His writings are noted for his view that Western thought is bankrupt.

== Early life ==
He was born in County Westmeath, Ireland, the fourth son in a large family. His father was Robert Holmes (1803–1870) of Moycashel, a farmer known as a breeder of English shorthorn cattle, and of racehorses; his mother was Jane Henn (1824–1905), daughter of William Henn junior, a master in chancery. Both Edmond and his younger brother the classical scholar T. Rice Holmes were born at Waterstone House (Waterston), a property near Athlone owned by Robert Holmes.

Edmond Holmes moved to London in 1861, at age 11. He was educated from 1863 at Merchant Taylors' School, and matriculated at St John's College, Oxford in 1869, graduating B.A. in 1874 with a first class degree in Greats, M.A. 1876. On his father's death, the family estate including land at Ardnurcher, Kilbeggan and Durrow passed to the eldest son Robert William Arbuthnot Holmes (1843–1910), a barrister and government official, who in the 1870s owned 1,298 acres (525 ha).

Briefly teaching at Repton School and Wellington School after Oxford, Holmes was then a tutor in the family of George Finch-Hatton, 11th Earl of Winchilsea.

== Career ==
Holmes became an inspector of schools in 1875, a position he obtained through the influence of the Earl of Winchilsea.

Holmes rose to become chief inspector for elementary schools in 1905. He resigned in 1910. Stewart called this end to his official career an "enforced resignation"; he had made criticisms of the status quo, and from then on took on an external gadfly role. By this time he had been joined by other critics of contemporary education, Victor Bulwer-Lytton, 2nd Earl of Lytton and James Herbert Simpson, later the first head of Rendcomb College.

=== Katherine Bathurst ===
Katherine Bathurst who had had a troubled career was transferred from Wales to work under Holmes's supervision. Disputes between them ensued, including expenses, timetables and Bathurst's objections to Holmes amending her reports. The Oxford Education Committee complained about her and she was given six months probation in February 1904; in the following month female inspectors were moved to a new organisation as proposed by Robert Morant. Bathurst was sent to Manchester.

=== "Egeria" ===
Holmes was impressed on encountering the teacher Harriet Finlay-Johnson in 1903. When he came to write What Is and What Might Be (1911), he took her school at Sompting in Sussex as a "Utopian" example of elementary education, using the pseudonym "Egeria" for Finlay-Johnson.

For Holmes, Finlay-Johnson appeared as Maria Montessori but avant la lettre. She published her ideas in 1912 as The Dramatic Method of Teaching, with his encouragement.

=== Holmes-Morant circular ===
In 1910/11 Holmes became involved in controversy, over a confidential memorandum criticising school inspectors who had formerly been elementary school teachers. This angered the teachers' union and it led to the downfall of Robert Morant, the permanent secretary to the Board of Education, when it became public.

== New Ideals in Education conferences ==
Holmes played a significant role in founding the "New Ideals in Education" group, which ran a first conference in 1914 at East Runton on Montessori education. Involved initially were Beatrice de Normann, Belle Rennie, James Herbert Simpson and Alice Woods. Further recruits were Wyatt Trevelyan Rawson Rawson of Dartington Hall and Thorold Coade of Bryanston School. The conference series continued into the 1930s. The initial meeting also led to the foundation of the New Education Fellowship.

== Publications ==
Holmes's writings on education are taken as an early statement of "progressive" and "child-centred" positions.

- What Is and What Might Be (1911), critical of the existing school system.
- The Montessori System of Education (1912)
- The Tragedy of Education (1913)
- In Defence of What Might Be (1914). A review described it as "pregnant with possibilities for the untrammeled soul of the growing child. A draft of fresh air into static pedagogy."
- Freedom and Growth and other essays (1923)

Poetry

- Poems (1876) and Poems: Second Series (1879) were written under the influence of Literature and Dogma by Matthew Arnold.
- The Silence of Love (1901) and The Triumph of Love (1903), two sonnet sequences both of 113 sonnets. Words from five of the latter were set to music by Charles Villiers Stanford, a friend from Merchant Taylors', whose courtship of Jennie Wetton had been supported by Holmes as a go-between.
- Walt Whitman's Poetry: A Study & A Selection (1902)
- The Creed of My Heart and other poems (1912)
- Sonnets to the Universe (1918)
- Sonnets and Poems (1920), anthology

Religious

- A Confession of Faith. By an Unorthodox Believer (1895)
- The Creed of Christ (1905)
- The Creed of the Buddha (1908)
- All is One; a plea for the higher pantheism (c.1921)
- Experience of Reality (A Study of Mysticism) (1928)

Other works

- Sursum Corda. A Defence of Idealism
- In Quest of an Ideal (1920), autobiography
- Philosophy Without Metaphysics (1930)
- The Headquarters of Reality. A Challenge to Western Thought (1933)

== Personal life ==
Holmes married in 1880 Florence Mary Syme (died 1927), daughter of Peter Macfarlane Syme RA and his wife Elizabeth Georgina Mulock. They had three children, two daughters and a son. Of the children:

- Verena Holmes became a leading early woman engineer;
- Maurice Gerald Holmes (1885–1964) became a British civil servant.

== Bibliography ==
- Edmond Holmes and the Tragedy of Education (1998) Chris Shute.
- Gordon, P. (1983). "The writings of Edmond Holmes: a reassessment and bibliography." History of Education 12(1): 15–24.
- Gordon, P. (1978). "The Holmes-Morant Circular of 1911: A Note." Journal of Educational Administration and History X(1): 36–40.
