= Harvey Goodwin =

British academic (1818–1891)

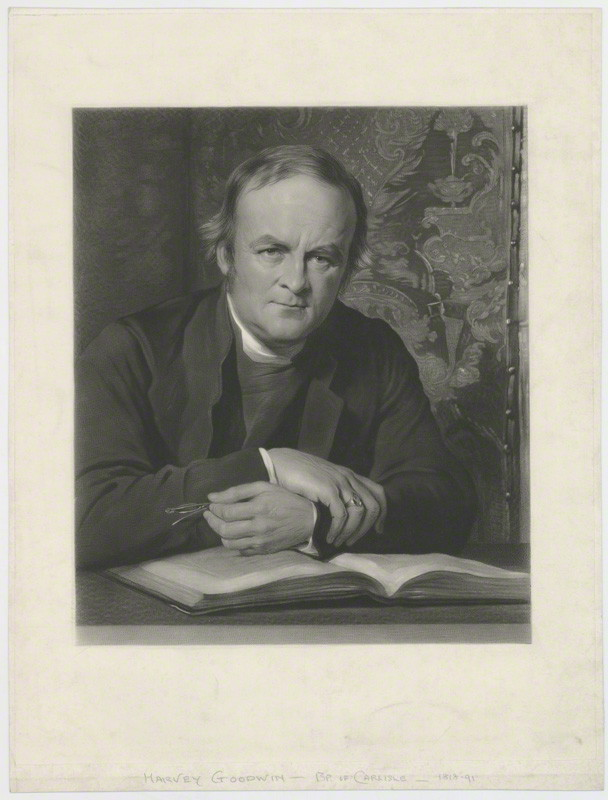
Harvey Goodwin, engraving after George Richmond

Harvey Goodwin (9 October 1818 – 25 November 1891) was an English academic and Anglican clergyman, who was Bishop of Carlisle from 1869 until his death.

== Life ==
Born at King's Lynn, he was a son of Charles Goodwin, a solicitor there; his mother was Frances Sawyer. One of his brothers was Charles Wycliffe Goodwin, the Egyptologist and judge. From 1825 to 1833 he was educated at a private school at High Wycombe. Before going into residence at Cambridge, he joined a party at Keswick, Cumberland, and read with William Hepworth Thompson, then a Fellow of Trinity College, Cambridge. He was admitted pensioner of Gonville and Caius College, Cambridge on 16 November 1835, and soon gave evidence of ability in mathematics. From Lady Day 1837 to Michaelmas 1839 he was scholar of his college. In his second year he became a pupil of the private tutor William Hopkins, and in the Mathematical Tripos of 1839 came out second to Robert Leslie Ellis. He was elected second Smith's prizeman, Ellis being first. In 1840 he won the Schuldham prize, and in 1844 delivered the Wortley speech. He graduated Bachelor of Arts (BA) in 1840 and Master of Arts (MA Cantab) in 1843.

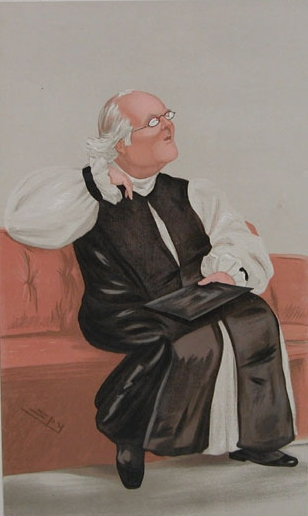
"Carlisle", Goodwin as caricatured by Spy (Leslie Ward) in Vanity Fair, March 1888

On graduating BA, Goodwin was appointed to a mathematical lectureship at Caius, and at Michaelmas 1841 became Fellow of his college. In 1842 he was ordained deacon, and priest in 1844. His close friends at Cambridge, besides Leslie Ellis and Charles Mackenzie, whose life he wrote in 1864, were Thomas Thorp (afterwards Archdeacon of Bristol), John Mason Neale, Philip Freeman, and Benjamin Webb. With them he shared advanced ecclesiological views, and with Neale and Webb he set on foot in 1848 the Ecclesiological Society, which developed into the Cambridge Camden Society.

In 1844 Goodwin took charge, as locum, of St Giles' Church, Cambridge. In the same year he preached for the first time in the university pulpit, and in the year following was nominated select preacher. In 1845 he preached before the British Association, which met at Cambridge. After his marriage, in the same year, he continued to reside at Cambridge, taking pupils and occupying himself with parish work, and he was mainly instrumental in establishing in 1847 the industrial school at Chesterton (later named the Harvey Goodwin Home). In 1848 he was appointed to the incumbency of St Edward's, Cambridge, where he was a popular preacher.

Goodwin was offered the colonial bishopric of Grahamstown in 1853, which he refused. In November 1858 he was appointed Dean of Ely by Edward Smith-Stanley, 14th Earl of Derby. In 1859 received from his university the degree Doctor of Divinity (DD), and the public orator William George Clark spoke of his work. On 11 December 1880 he was elected honorary fellow of Gonville and Caius, and in 1885 was created honorary Doctor of Civil Law (hon. DCL) of Oxford University. As Dean of Ely, Goodwin continued the work of the restoration of Ely Cathedral begun by George Peacock, under Robert Willis's guidance, and he saw completed the painting of the nave roof, which was executed in part by Henry L'Estrange Styleman Le Strange of Hunstanton, and, after his death in 1862, completed by his friend Thomas Gambier Parry. The lantern also was rebuilt, the nave pavement relaid, the Galilee entrance restored, and a warming apparatus placed for the first time in the cathedral. While at Ely he served on two royal commissions, those on clerical subscription and ritual.

In October 1869 he accepted Gladstone's offer to became Bishop of Carlisle. He held the post until his death. From his known interest in scientific subjects he was asked by George Bradley, Dean of Westminster, to preach in Westminster Abbey on the Sunday after the funeral of Charles Darwin, 1 May 1882. He died on 25 November 1891 at Bishopthorpe, while on a visit to William Maclagan, Archbishop of York, and was buried in the churchyard of St Kentigern's Church, Crosthwaite, Keswick. His monument in Carlisle Cathedral consists of a recumbent figure in bronze, executed by Hamo Thornycroft.

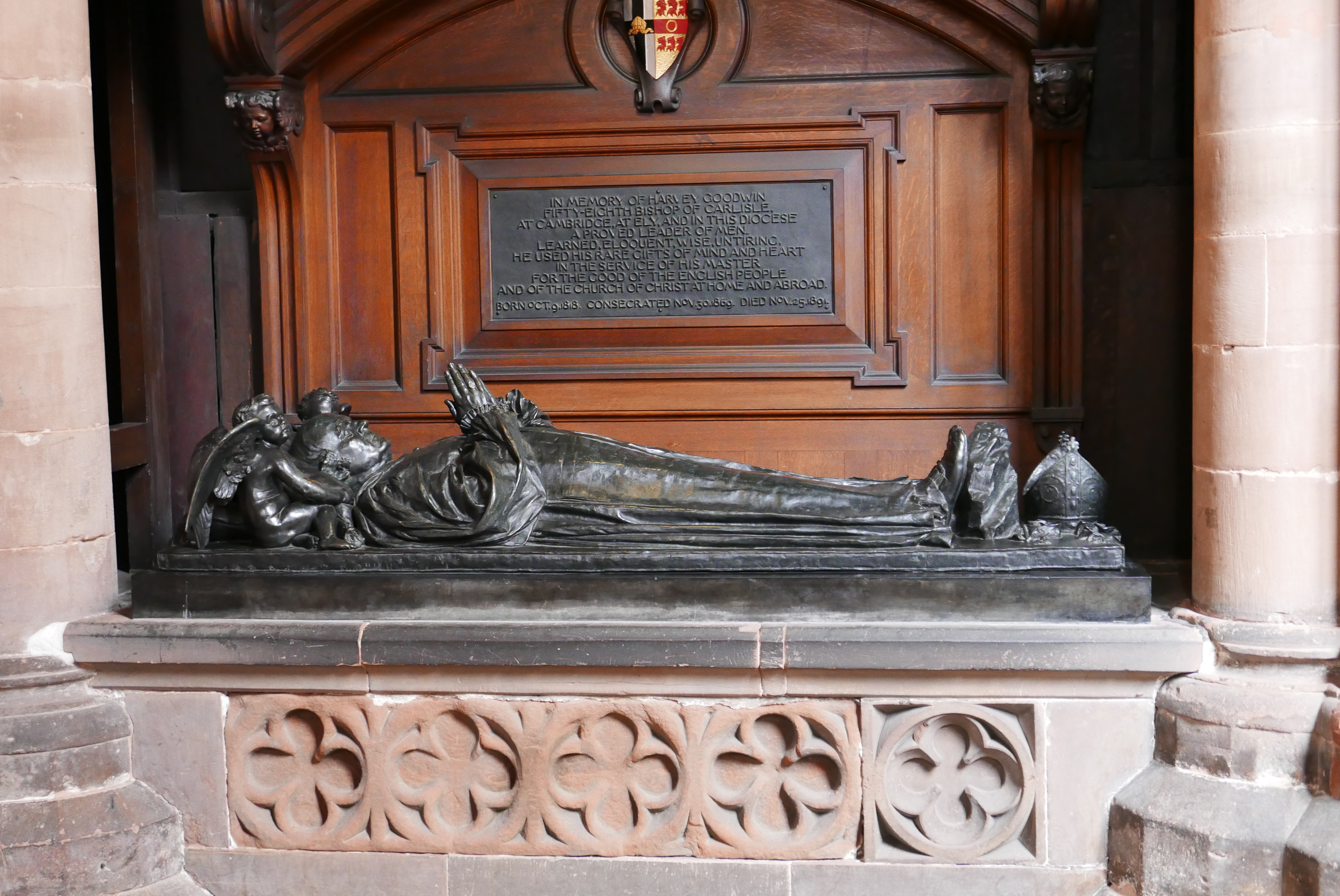
Harvey Goodwin's monument in Carlisle Cathedral

Hardwicke Rawnsley wrote a memoir of him. A street in Cambridge and a school in Carlisle are named after Goodwin.

== Works ==
Apart from sermons and lectures, and commentaries on the Gospels of St Matthew (1857), St Mark (1860) and St Luke (1865), his major publications were:

- Elementary Course of Mathematics, 1847; 5th edit. 1857.
- Parish Sermons, 1847–62, 5 vols.
- The Doom of Sin and the Inspiration of the Bible
- Guide to the Parish Church, Cambridge, 1855; new edition rewritten 1878.
- Hulsean Lectures, 1855.
- The Doctrines and Difficulties of the Christian Faith, 1856.
- A new translation of the De Imitatione, 1860; new edit. 1869.
- Essays on the Pentateuch, 1867.
- Walks in the Region of Science and Faith, a collection of essays, 1883.
- Goodwin, Harvey (1885). An address to women. London: Society for Promoting Christian Knowledge.
- The Foundations of the Creed, 1889; 3rd edit. 1899.

He was also a contributor to the Quarterly Review, Contemporary Review and The Nineteenth Century.

== Family ==
Goodwin married, on 13 August 1845, Ellen, eldest daughter of George King of Bebington Hall, Cheshire, and by her had three sons and four daughters. His son-in-law Henry Ware was Bishop of Barrow-in-Furness from 1891 until 1909. Catherine, the second daughter, married Henry Spooner in 1875.

== Bibliography ==
- Hardwicke Rawnsley (1896). Harvey Goodwin Bishop of Carlisle: A Biographical Memoir. London: John Murray. OCLC 20378714.
- Banerjee, Jacqueline (18 July 2014). "Monument to Bishop Harvey Goodwin by Sir W. Hamo Thornycroft, Carlisle Cathedral". The Victorian Web.

This article incorporates text from a publication now in the public domain: Lee, Sidney, ed. (1901). "Goodwin, Harvey". Dictionary of National Biography (1st supplement). London: Smith, Elder & Co.

Church of England titles
| Preceded by George Peacock | Dean of Ely; 1858–1869 | Succeeded by Charles Merivale |
| Preceded by Samuel Waldegrave | Bishop of Carlisle; 1869–1891 | Succeeded by John Bardsley |
