= Henry Francis Pelham =

British scholar and historian (1846–1907)

Henry Francis Pelham FSA FBA
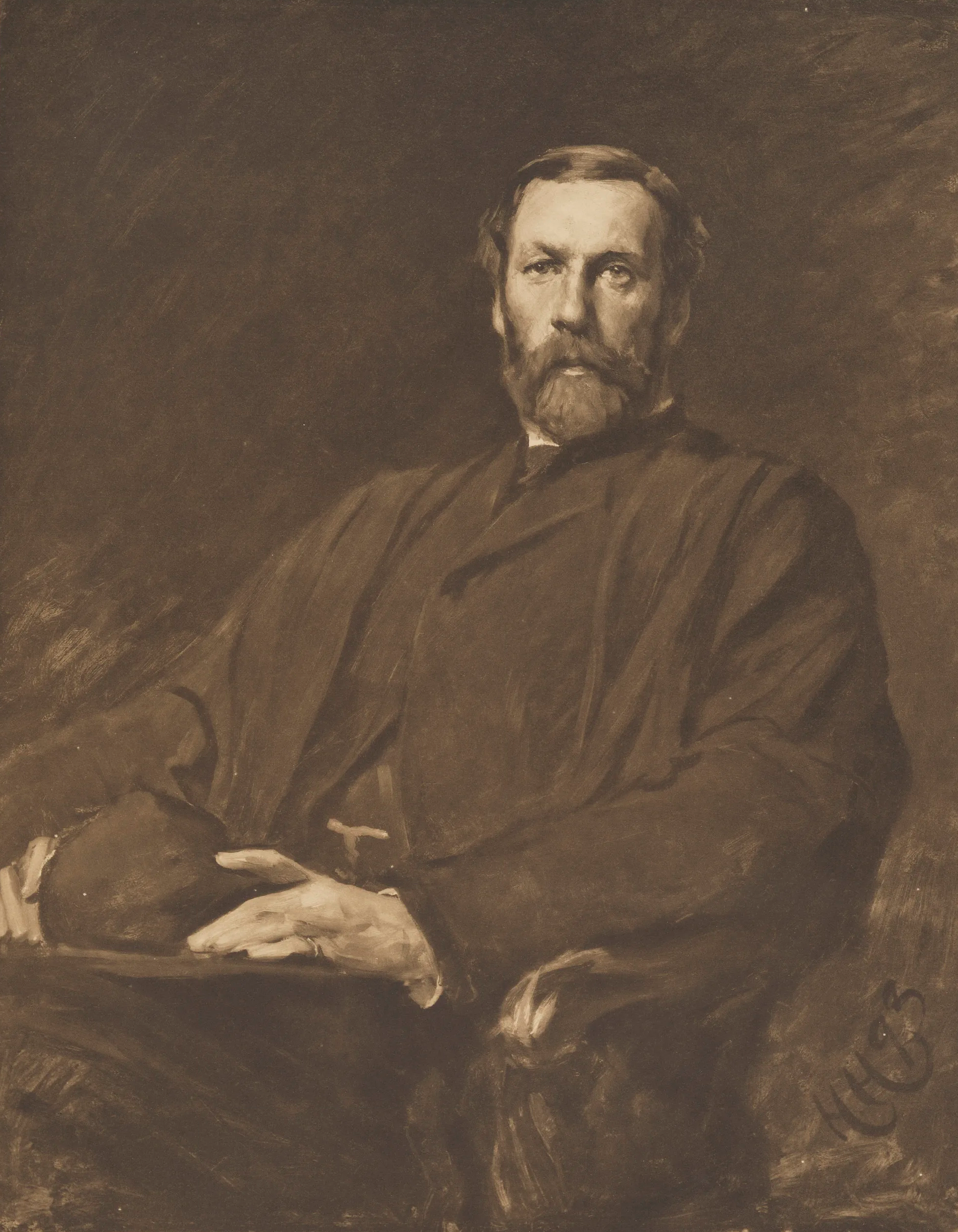
- 1893 photogravure of a painting by Hubert von Herkomer

19th President of Trinity College Oxford
- In office 1897–1907
- Preceded by: Henry George Woods
- Succeeded by: Herbert Edward Douglas Blakiston

Personal details
- Born: 10 October 1846 Bergh Apton, Norfolk
- Died: 13 February 1907 (aged 60) Oxford
- Children: 5, including Henry and Herbert
- Parents: John Thomas Pelham; Henrietta Pelham (Tatton)
- Education: Trinity College, Oxford

Henry Francis Pelham, FSA, FBA (10 September 1846 – 13 February 1907) was an English scholar and historian. He was Camden Professor of Ancient History at the University of Oxford from 1889 to 1907. He was also President of Trinity College, Oxford from 1897 to 1907.

== Early life ==
He was the grandson of Thomas Pelham, 2nd Earl of Chichester, and eldest of the five children of John Thomas Pelham, bishop of Norwich, and Henrietta, second daughter of Thomas William Tatton of Wythenshawe Hall, Cheshire. Of his three brothers, John Barrington became vicar of Thundridge in 1908, and Sidney archdeacon of Norfolk in 1901.

Pelham was born on 19 September 1846 at Bergh Apton, then his father's parish. Entering Harrow in May 1860, he moved rapidly up the school and left in December 1864. Next year he won an open classical scholarship at Trinity College, Oxford, matriculating on 22 April 1865; he came into residence in October.

== Academic career ==
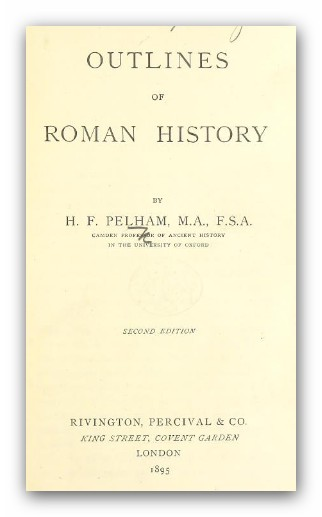
Title page of the 1895 edition of Pelham's Outlines of Roman History

At Oxford, he took 'first classes' in honour classical moderations and literæ humaniores, was elected a fellow of Exeter College in 1869, and graduated B.A. in the same year. In 1870, he won the Chancellor's English Essay Prize with a dissertation on the reciprocal influence of national character and national language.

He worked continuously as a classical tutor and lecturer at Exeter College from 1870 to 1889. He was elected by his college proctor of the university in 1879. Losing his fellowship on his marriage in 1873, he was re-elected in 1882, under the statutes of the second university commission.

From school onwards his principal subject was ancient and more particularly Roman history. He soon began to publish articles on this theme (first in Journal of Philology, 1876), while his lectures, which (under the system then growing up) were open to members of other colleges besides Exeter, attracted increasingly large audiences; he also planned, with the Clarendon Press, a detailed History of the Roman Empire, which he was not destined to carry out.

In 1887, he succeeded W. W. Capes as 'common fund reader' in ancient history, and in 1889 he became Camden Professor of Ancient History in succession to George Rawlinson, a post to which a fellowship at Brasenose College is attached. As professor, he developed the lectures and teaching that he had been giving as a college tutor and reader and attracted even larger audiences.

But his research work was stopped by an attack of cataract in both eyes (1890), and though a few specimen paragraphs of his projected History were set up in type in 1888, he completed in manuscript only three and a half chapters, covering the years B.C. 35-15, and he never resumed the work after 1890; his other research, too, was hereafter limited to detached points in Roman imperial history.

On the other hand, he joined actively in administrative work, for which his strong personality and his clear sense fitted him at least as well as for research; he served on many Oxford boards, was a member of the Hebdomadal Council from 1879 to 1905, aided semi-academic educational movements (he was a founder of the women's college Somerville Hall), and in 1897 accepted the presidency of his old college. Trinity.

He was elected honorary fellow of Exeter in 1895, was an original fellow of the British Academy in 1902 and received the hon. Degree of LL.D. at Aberdeen in 1906. He became F.S.A. in 1890 and was on the governing body of Abingdon School until 1895.

== Family and personal life ==
On 30 July 1873, he married Laura Priscilla Buxton, third daughter of Sir Edward Buxton, 2nd Baronet, and granddaughter of Sir Fowell Buxton, 1st Baronet. They had three sons and two daughters:

- Sir Edward Henry Pelham KCB (1876–1949), civil servant
- Arthur John Pelham (24 December 1878 – 11 August 1883), died in childhood
- Rt Rev Herbert Pelham (1881–1944), Bishop of Barrow-in-Furness
- Catherine Harriet Pelham (8 September 1885 – 20 November 1894), died in childhood
- Laura Grace Pelham (20 September 1888 – 18 April 1980) married David Francis Bickmore DSO (1891– †1918), son of Rev Francis Askew Bickmore

He died in the president's lodgings at Trinity on 12 February 1907 and was buried in St Sepulchre's Cemetery.

== Notes ==
Academic offices
Preceded by Henry George Woods	President of Trinity College, Oxford; 1897–1907	Succeeded by Herbert Edward Douglas Blakiston
