= Margaret Louisa Woods =

English novelist and poet (1855–1945)

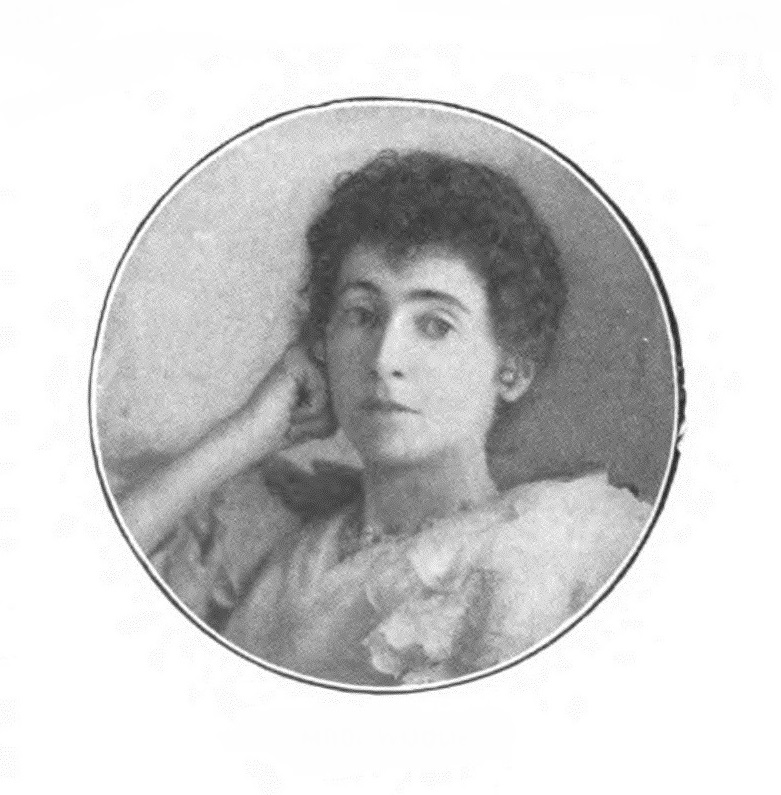
Margaret Louisa Woods

Margaret Louisa Woods (née Bradley; 20 November 1855 – 1 December 1945) was an English writer, known for novels and for her lyrical and socially conscious poetry.

== Life ==
She was born in Rugby, the daughter of the scholar George Granville Bradley, an academic and senior priest, who served as Dean of Westminster from 1881 to 1902. Her sister was the writer Mabel Birchenough. In 1879 she married Henry George Woods, who became President of Trinity College, Oxford, and Master of the Temple. They built Thessaly Cottage, on the ridge of Boars Hill above Oxford, one of the first brick houses to be established there, and stayed there until 1893. There were three sons. Margaret died at her home, Vine Cottage, in Thursley, Surrey. Her ashes are interred with her husband, at Holywell Cemetery, Oxford.

== Novels ==
Esther Vanhomrigh, is a historical romance inspired by the life of the Irish poet Esther Vanhomrigh, the lover and correspondent of Jonathan Swift. The Vagabonds is an exploration of male perceptions of women. There are three novels set in Spain at the time of the Peninsular War (Sons of the Sword, The King's Revoke, The Spanish Lady). A Poet's Youth is a portrayal of William Wordsworth. Her most unusual novel, The Invader, is a fantasy about a young female scholar (one of the earliest women students accepted by Oxford University), who is possessed by the spirit of a similar fore-bearer.

- A Village Tragedy (1889)
- Esther Vanhomrigh (1891)
- Sons of the Sword (1901)
- The King's Revoke (1905)
- The Invader (1907)
- A Poet's Youth (1923)
- The Spanish Lady (1927)

== Other writing ==
=== Verse collections ===
- Lyrics and Ballads (1889)
- Aeromancy (1896)
- Songs (1896)
- Poems Old and New (1907)
- Collected Poems (1913)
- The Return and Other Poems (1921)

=== Poetic drama ===
- Wild Justice (1896)
- The Princess of Hanover (1902)

=== Juvenile fiction ===
- Come Unto These Yellow Sands (1915), illustrated by J. Hancock.

=== Travel ===
- Pastels under the Southenn Cross (1911)
