= Campbell West-Watson =

Archbishop of New Zealand (1877–1953)

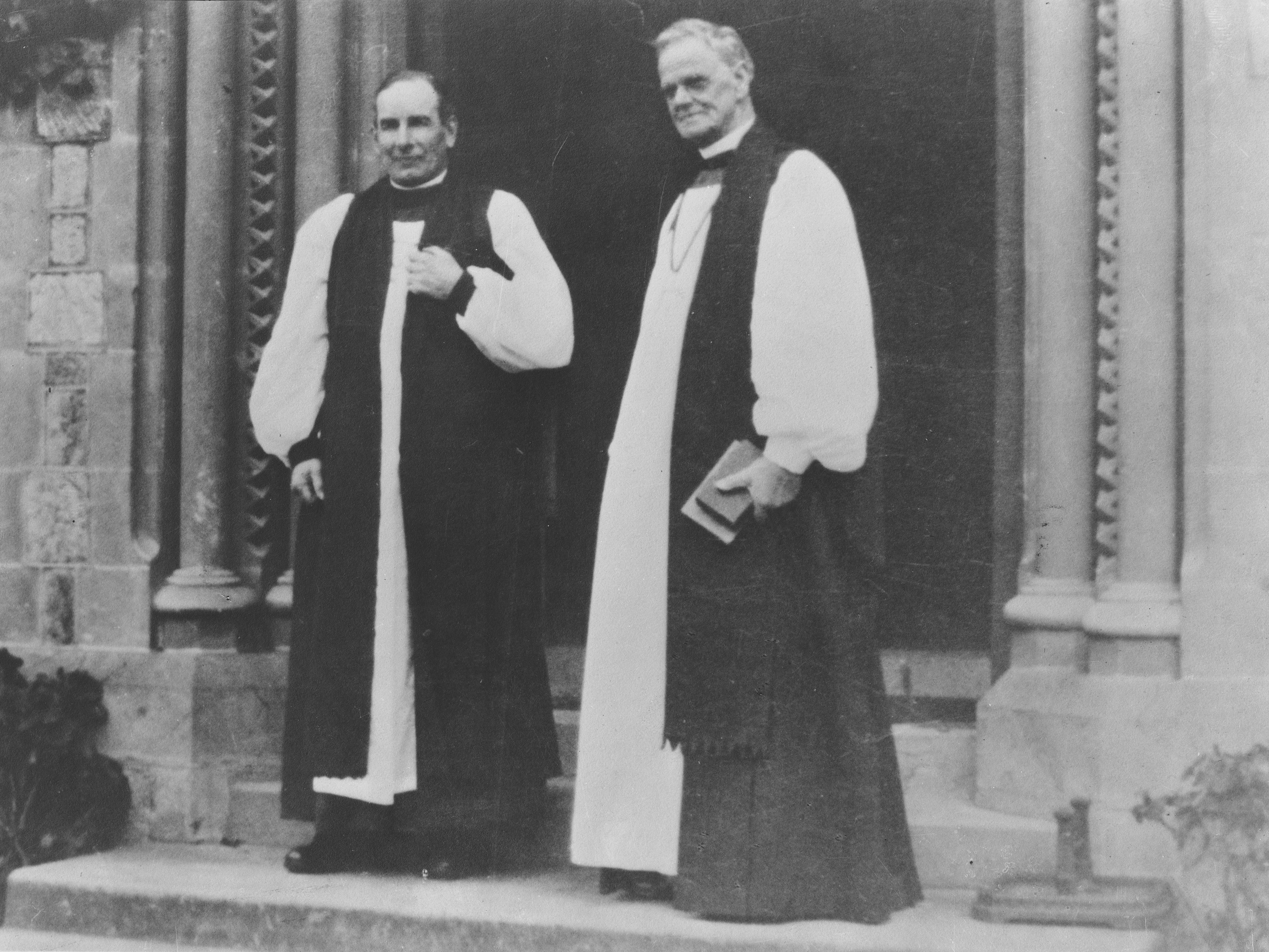
Campbell West-Watson (left) and Churchill Julius in 1940

Campbell West-Watson CMG (23 April 1877 – 19 May 1953) was successively an Anglican suffragan bishop, diocesan bishop and archbishop over a 40-year period during the first half of the 20th century.

Born on 23 April 1877 he was educated at Birkenhead School and Emmanuel College, Cambridge before being ordained priest in 1903. After six years as Chaplain, Fellow and Lecturer at his old college he was appointed Bishop of Barrow-in-Furness in 1909. After 16 years he was translated to Christchurch, New Zealand. In 1940 he was additionally appointed to be the Archbishop and Primate of the whole country, serving until 1951. Described in his Times obituary as "a man of great approachability and unaffected goodness", he died on 19 May 1953.

In 1935, West-Watson was awarded the King George V Silver Jubilee Medal. He was appointed a Companion of the Order of St Michael and St George in the 1952 Queen's Birthday Honours.

Church of England titles
Preceded by Henry Ware	Bishop of Barrow-in-Furness; 1909–1926	Succeeded by Herbert Pelham
Preceded by Churchill Julius	Bishop of Christchurch; 1926–1951	Succeeded by Alwyn Warren
Preceded by Alfred Averill	Archbishop of New Zealand; 1940–1951	Succeeded by Reginald Owen
