= David Clementi =

British banker (born 1949)

Sir David Clementi

Chairman of the BBC
- In office 3 April 2017 – 15 February 2021
- Preceded by: Rona Fairhead (Chair of the BBC Trust)
- Succeeded by: Richard Sharp

Deputy Governor of the Bank of England
- In office 1997–2002
- Preceded by: Sir Howard Davies
- Succeeded by: Andrew Large

Personal details
- Born: David Cecil Clementi; 25 February 1949 (age 77)
- Spouse: Sarah Louise Cowley (m. 1972)
- Children: 2
- Parent: Cresswell Clementi
- Relatives: Cecil Clementi (paternal grandfather); Sir Henry Pelham (maternal grandfather); Cecil Clementi Smith (paternal great great uncle); Muzio Clementi (paternal great-great grandfather)
- Education: Winchester College; Lincoln College, Oxford; Harvard Business School
- Occupation: Businessman

Sir David Cecil Clementi (born 25 February 1949) is a British business executive. He is a former deputy governor of the Bank of England, a former chairman of Prudential plc, and a former chairman of the BBC.

In March 2008, he was announced as warden of Winchester College and, in 2010, was Master of the Mercers' Company.

== Early life ==
David Cecil Clementi was born on 25 February 1949. His father, Cresswell Clementi, was an air vice-marshal in the Royal Air Force. His grandfather Sir Cecil Clementi was Governor of Hong Kong from 1925 to 1930 and Governor and Commander-in-Chief of the Straits Settlements from 1930 to 1934. His great-great-grandfather was Italian-Swiss musician Muzio Clementi. His maternal grandfather was Sir Henry Pelham, Permanent Secretary of the Board of Education from 1931 to 1937.

He was educated at Winchester College, where he was captain of athletics and a distinguished footballer. He then went to Lincoln College, Oxford, where he obtained a degree in Philosophy, Politics, and Economics and a blue for athletics. He was a member of the Great Britain Junior Athletics team in 1968. After graduating, he qualified as a chartered accountant. He graduated MBA (Baker Scholar) from Harvard Business School in 1975.

== Career ==
After graduating from Harvard Business School, Clementi commenced a career in the finance industry. He spent 22 years at investment bank Kleinwort Benson. In 1994, Clementi and Nicholas Redmayne were appointed as joint chief executives of investment banking. His nickname at Kleinwort Benson was "The Duke".

Clementi was Deputy Governor of the Bank of England from 1997 to 2002. In December 2002, he became chairman of Prudential plc until December 2008. He was chairman of Virgin Money from October 2011 until May 2015. From February 2017 to February 2021, he was Chairman of the BBC.

He held a number of other board positions. He was a non-executive director of Rio Tinto Group from 2003 to 2010; a Non-Executive Director of Foreign & Colonial Investment Trust from 2008 to 2012; vice-chairman at investment managers, Ruffer LLP from 2011 to 2017; chairman of international payments business World First from 2011 to 2018 and chairman of King's Cross Central, responsible for the regeneration of the King's Cross Estate, from 2008 to 2024.

Among non-business interests, he was on the board of The Royal Opera House from 2006 to 2014, Warden (chairman of the governing body) of Winchester College from 2008 to 2014, Master of the Mercers' Company 2010 to 2011, and a trustee of The Royal Society of Medicine from 2010 to 2016.

He wrote two reports for HM Government. In July 2003, he was given the task, by the Secretary of State for Constitutional Affairs, Lord Falconer of Thoroton, of undertaking a wide-ranging independent review of the regulation of legal services in England and Wales, published in December 2004 and known generally as the Clementi report. In September 2015, he was asked by the Secretary of State for the Department for Culture, Media and Sport (DCMS) to write a report on the governance of the BBC, published in March 2016 entitled "A Review of the Governance and Regulation of the BBC".

In 2004, Clementi was appointed Knight Bachelor.

== Personal life ==
Clementi married Sarah Louise Cowley, daughter of Dr Anthony Beach Cowley and Mary Mabel Bebington, on 23 September 1972. They have one daughter (Anna Lucy, born 26 November 1976) and one son (Thomas Cowley, born 17 April 1979).

Media offices
Preceded by Rona Fairhead as Chair of the BBC Trust	Chair of the BBC Board; 16 February 2017 – 15 February 2021	Succeeded by Richard Sharp
