= Henry Ware (bishop of Barrow-in-Furness) =

Henry Ware (22 June 1830 – 16 April 1909) was the inaugural Anglican Bishop of Barrow-in-Furness from 1889 until his death in 1909.

== Life ==
Born in 1830 and educated at Trinity College, Cambridge, his post until ordination was as a Fellow and Tutor at his old college. He was made deacon in 1860 and ordained priest in 1862; that year, he was appointed Vicar of Kirkby Lonsdale, a post he held until 1888 when he was appointed to the episcopate. He was consecrated a bishop on 11 June 1889, by William Thomson, Archbishop of York, at York Minster. He died on 16 April 1909. His father-in-law Harvey Goodwin was Bishop of Carlisle from 1869 until 1891.

== Freemasonry ==
Ware was an active Freemason, having been initiated in 1865 in the Underley Lodge No 1074 at Kirkby Lonsdale. He served as Worshipful Master of that lodge in 1872 and again in 1888. In 1869 he was appointed Provincial Grand Chaplain for the Province of Cumberland and Westmoreland, becoming Grand Junior Warden of the province in 1873. Although many other Anglican bishops had been Freemasons before him, he is believed to have been the first bishop to accept the national appointment of Grand Chaplain in the United Grand Lodge of England, an office to which he was appointed in 1895.

== Notes ==
Church of England titles
Preceded by Inaugural appointment	Bishop of Barrow-in-Furness; 1889 – 1909	Succeeded by Campbell West-Watson
