= Henry George Woods =

The Reverend Henry George Woods
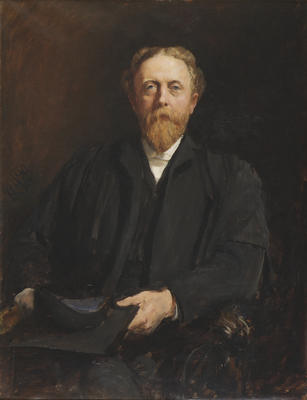
- Title: Master of the Temple

Personal life
- Born: 16 June 1842 Woodend, Northamptonshire
- Died: 19 July 1915 (aged 73) London, England
- Resting place: Holywell Cemetery, Oxford

Religious life
- Religion: Christianity (Anglicism)
- Ordination: 1866 (deacon); 1867 (priest)

Senior posting
- Period in office: 1904 to 1915
- Predecessor: Alfred Ainger
- Successor: Ernest Barnes
- Previous post: President of Trinity College, Oxford (1887 to 1897)

Henry George Woods (16 June 1842 – 19 July 1915) was an Anglican clergyman and academic. He was President of Trinity College, Oxford, from 1887 to 1897 and Master of the Temple from 1904 to 1915.

== Early life ==
Woods was born on 16 June 1842 in Woodend, Northamptonshire. He was educated at Lancing College, an Anglican public school in Lancing, West Sussex. As an exhibitioner and later a scholar, he studied classics at Corpus Christi College, Oxford. He gained a first in Mods in 1863 and a first in Greats in 1865.

== Academic career ==
In 1865, Woods was elected a fellow of Trinity College, Oxford. In 1866, he was appointed a tutor. He served as bursar from 1867 to 1887. In 1887, he was elected President of Trinity College, Oxford. He resigned the post in 1897; his wife's health was deteriorating at the time and this was given as the reason for his resignation. He was elected an honorary fellow of Trinity College in 1898.

== Religious life ==
On 23 December 1866, Woods was ordained a deacon in the Church of England by Samuel Wilberforce, the then Bishop of Oxford, at Christ Church Cathedral, Oxford. He was ordained a priest the following year. From 1900 to 1904, he was rector of Little Gaddesden, Hertfordshire. In 1904, he was appointed Master of the Temple, the lead cleric of the Temple Church, London. The Temple Church was the headquarters of the Knights Templar before they were disbanded in the 14th century.

He died on 19 July 1915 at the Master's House, his home in London as Master of the Temple. He was buried at Holywell Cemetery in Oxford.

== Personal life ==
In 1879, Woods married Margaret Louisa Bradley, a novelist and poet. She was the daughter of George Bradley, an academic and senior priest, who served as Dean of Westminster from 1881 to 1902. Woods and his wife had three sons.

Academic offices
Preceded by John Percival	President of Trinity College, Oxford; 1887 to 1897	Succeeded by Henry Francis Pelham
Religious titles
Preceded by Alfred Ainger	Master of the Temple; 1904 to 1915	Succeeded by Ernest Barnes
