= John Porter (MP for Maldon) =

English politician

John Porter (died ca. 1660) was an English lawyer and politician who sat in the House of Commons in 1640.

Porter was the son of John Porter of Lamberhurst, Kent. He entered Lincoln's Inn in November 1621. He became recorder of Madon in Essex.

In April 1640, Porter was elected Member of Parliament for Maldon in the Short Parliament. Porter was called to the bench in 1648.

Porter's will was proved at the Probate Court of Canterbury in April 1660.

Porter married Mary Bramston daughter of Sir John Bramston chief justice.

Parliament of England
| Vacant Parliament suspended since 1629 | Member of Parliament for Maldon; 1640; With: Henry Mildmay | Succeeded by Sir Henry Mildmay; John Clotworthy |
