= Maurice Gerald Holmes =

British civil servant

Personal details
- Born: Maurice Gerald Holmes; 14 June 1885 Ashford, Kent, England
- Died: 4 April 1964 (aged 78) Chelsea, London, England
- Spouse: Ivy Mary Beatrice Dunsford
- Children: Barbara Holmes, Daphne Holmes
- Parents: Edmond Gore Alexander Holmes; Florence Syme
- Occupation: civil servant

Sir Maurice Gerald Holmes (14 June 1885 – 4 April 1964) was a British civil servant.

== Family and education ==
Holmes was the only son of Edmond Gore Alexander Holmes Chief Inspector of Elementary Schools and Florence Mary Syme. He had two sisters, one of whom was the early woman engineer Verena Winifred Holmes. Educated at Wellington College, Holmes read jurisprudence at Balliol where he received a First. He was called to the bar in 1909 but, while waiting to start practising, he took a placement at the Board of Education (using his father's connections there), and decided to make it his career instead of law.

== Career ==
Holmes joined the Board of Education in 1909, where he was to stay until 1945, except for the First World War, when he joined the Army and rose to the rank of lieutenant-colonel.

Holmes rose to become Director of Establishments in 1923–26, reaching the position of Deputy Secretary in 1931. In 1937, he replaced Sir Henry Pelham as the Permanent Secretary. During the Second World War, Holmes was given the task of developing the so-called Green Book which served as a precursor for the landmark Education Act 1944. He retired in 1945, to be replaced by Sir John Redcliffe-Maud.

After his retirement, Holmes served as the Chairman of the East African Salaries Commission in 1947, the Colonial Office inquiry into Civil Services of Kenya, Tanzania and Uganda, the 1948 Caribbean Public Services Unification Commission, and the Lord Chancellor's Committee on Office of Public Trustee in 1954.

== Honours ==
During his war-time service, Holmes was mentioned in despatches twice, and was appointed as an Officer of the Order of the British Empire and of the Order of the Nile, and then received the CBE in 1919. He was created Companion of the Order of the Bath in 1929, and knighted as a Knight Commander (KCB) in 1938. He was invested as a Knight Grand Cross of the Order of the British Empire (GBE) in the 1946 New Year Honours.

== Works ==
Sir Maurice wrote Some Bibliographical Notes on the Novels of George Bernard Shaw, published 1929, and An Introduction to the Bibliography of Captain Cook, published 1936.

== Personal life ==
He married Ivy Dunsford in 1917, with whom he had two daughters. One of his daughters, Barbara, married Francis Hugh Addison Phillips, nephew of Eleanor Addison Phillips, in 1946.

Government offices
Preceded by Sir Henry Pelham	Permanent Secretary of the Board of Education; 1937–1945	Succeeded by Sir John Redcliffe-Maud as Permanent Secretary of the Ministry of Education
