= Robert Honywood (New Romney MP) =

English politician (1601–1686)

Sir Robert Honywood (3 August 1601 – 15 April 1686), also spelt Honeywood, was an English politician who sat in the House of Commons in 1659. He was a member of the English Council of State.

Honywood was the son of Sir Robert Honywood of Pett's Court, Charing, Kent and Alice Barnham, daughter of Sir Martin Barnham of Hollingbourne. Sir Thomas Honywood was his half-brother. He matriculated at Hart Hall, Oxford on 30 October 1618, aged about 17. In 1620 he became a student of Middle Temple. He was knighted on 15 June 1625. He spent several years in the household of Elizabeth Stuart, Queen of Bohemia, who referred to him as her "steward". In 1659, he was elected Member of Parliament for New Romney.

During the First English Civil War his marriage into the republican Vane family put him at the heart of the Parliamentary cause (his brother Thomas was also a strong Parliamentarian). After Parliament's victory in the war he sat in the Third Protectorate Parliament and on the Council of State, and was chosen with Algernon Sidney and Edward Montagu, 1st Earl of Sandwich as one of the English plenipotentiaries sent in 1659 to negotiate a peace between Sweden and Denmark. At the same time, he maintained friendly relations with the Queen of Bohemia, and perhaps on this account no action was taken against him at the Restoration of Charles II, who was her nephew, despite the fact that Sir Henry Vane the Younger, executed for treason in 1662, was his brother-in-law. He retired into private life, and was mainly occupied in his later years with writing a history of Venice, which was published in 1673.

Honywood died in 1686 at the age of about 85, leaving all his property to his wife.

He married, in 1631, Frances Vane, daughter of Sir Henry Vane the Elder and Frances Darcy. She died in 1688.

They had a very numerous family, many of whom died young. Robert, Charles Ludovic, Elizabeth and Frances are known to have reached adulthood; only Frances is definitely known to have outlived both her parents. Charles Ludovic married Mary Clement and was the father of several children, including Sir Philip Honywood; he died shortly after his father. Elizabeth married John Moore, son of the Irish writer Dorothy Durie (née King) and her first husband, Arthur Moore, fifth son of Garret Moore, 1st Viscount Moore and Mary Colley, and had issue. She died before 1688.

Parliament of England
Preceded by Not represented in Second Protectorate Parliament	Member of Parliament for New Romney; 1659; With: Lambert Godfrey	Succeeded by Not represented in Restored Rump
