= Arthur Harris (High Sheriff of Essex) =

Sir Arthur Harris (c. 1530–7 July 1597) of Creeksea Place in Essex, England, served as High Sheriff of Essex in 1589, a Justice of the Peace, and one of the Commissioners appointed in 1577 to enquire into piratical practices along the Essex coast.

He married Dorothy Waldegrave a daughter of Sir William Waldegrave of Smallbridge in Essex, by his wife Julia Reynsford. It has been established that Sir Arthur Harris lived at Creeksea, Woodham Mortimer, Cold Norton and in the City of London. Sir Arthur Harris built the surviving manor house Creeksea Place in Creeksea, Essex.

Sir Arthur Harris died 7 July 1597 and is buried at St. Mary's Church in Burnham-on-Crouch, Essex.

Children of Sir Arthur Harris and Dorothy Waldegrave

1. Sir William Harris
2. Dorothy Harris – b. ca. 1561 in Essex, died 1626. Married Robert Kempe.

See also his nephew, by his brother William:

- Herrys (Harris), Sir Arthur (c. 1587–1632), of Creeksea Place and Woodham Mortimer, Essex
