= Creeksea =

Village in Essex, England

Coordinates: 51.633°N 0.783°E

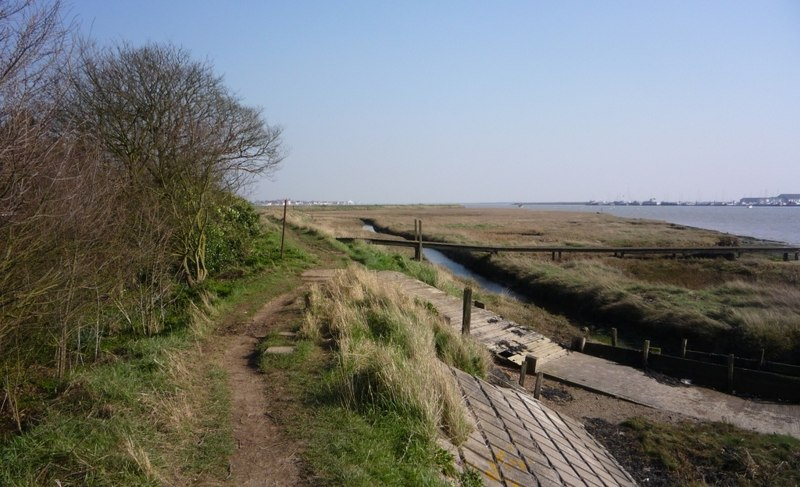
- Path along sea wall from Creeksea towards Burnham

- Location within Essex
- OS grid reference: TQ927963
- Civil parish: Burnham-on-Crouch
- District: Maldon
- Shire county: Essex
- Region: East
- Country: England
- Sovereign state: United Kingdom
- Post town: Burnham on Crouch
- Postcode district: CM0 8
- Dialling code: 01621
- Police: Essex
- Fire: Essex
- Ambulance: East of England
- UK Parliament: Maldon

Creeksea is a village in the civil parish of Burnham-on-Crouch, in the Maldon district of Essex, England. It is on the Dengie peninsula on the north side of the River Crouch, one mile west of Burnham-on-Crouch.

== History ==
Royal Air Force fast rescue boats and a Royal Navy motor torpedo boat flotilla operated from Creeksea during World War II.

Creeksea Place Manor, a large red brick house built c. 1569 by Sir Arthur Harris stands in the village.

Many variations of Creeksea are found in old documents including Cricksea, Crykseye and Crixsey.

Creeksea was an ancient parish in the Dengie Hundred of Essex. The parish was abolished in 1934 and most of its area was absorbed into the parish of Burnham, apart from an uninhabited are of 15 acres (6 hectares) which went instead to Canewdon. At the 1931 census (the last before the abolition of the civil parish), Creeksea had a population of 76.

== Port ==
Navigation on the River Crouch at Creeksea is governed by the Crouch Harbour Authority. There are 2 berths at Creeksea operated by Baltic Wharves,

== Local amenities ==
Established in 1957, Creeksea Sailing Club has launching facilities on the River Crouch. The local public house is the Greyhound. There is a golf course in the village.

== Religious sites ==
The local church is All Saints, in the Diocese of Chelmsford. The church was built in the 14th century and then rebuilt in 1878.
