= Cresswell Clementi =

Royal Air Force Air Vice-Marshal (1918-1981)

Cresswell Clementi CB, CBE
- Born: 30 December 1918; British Guiana
- Died: 26 August 1981 (aged 62)
- Spouse: Susan Pelham (m. 1940–1981)
- Children: Christopher Pelham Clementi (son); Nancy Tribe (daughter); David Clementi (son)
- Relatives: Cecil Clementi (father); Marie Penelope Rose Eyres (mother)
- Military career
- Allegiance: United Kingdom
- Branch: Royal Air Force
- Service years: 1938–1974
- Rank: Air Vice Marshal
- Commands: No. 214 Squadron (1946–1948); RAF Bassingbourn (1958–1961); No. 19 Group (1968–1969)
- Conflicts: Second World War
- Awards: Companion of the Order of the Bath; Commander of the Order of the British Empire; Mentioned in Despatches

Air Vice Marshal Cresswell Montagu Clementi CB, CBE (30 December 1918 – 26 August 1981) was a senior Royal Air Force (RAF) commander.

== Background ==
Clementi was the son of Cecil Clementi and Marie Penelope Rose Eyres. He was born on 20 December 1918 in British Guiana during his father's posting there as Colonial Secretary (1913–1922). He joined the Royal Air Force Volunteer Reserve in 1939, and was granted a permanent commission in the RAF in 1946. He attended the British nuclear tests in 1958 at Christmas Island. He retired in 1974. He was Master of the Mercers' Company in 1977.

He was on the governing body of Abingdon School from 1979 to 1981.

== Family ==
Clementi married Susan Pelham (1918–2006) in 1940 and had three children:

- Christopher Pelham Clementi (1943–2024)
- Nancy Clementi (1946–) – married Peter Lambert Tribe in 1972
- Sir David Clementi (1949–) – British banker, formerly chairman of Prudential plc.
