= Creeksea Place =

Country house in Essex, England

Coordinates: 51°37′48″N 00°47′32″E

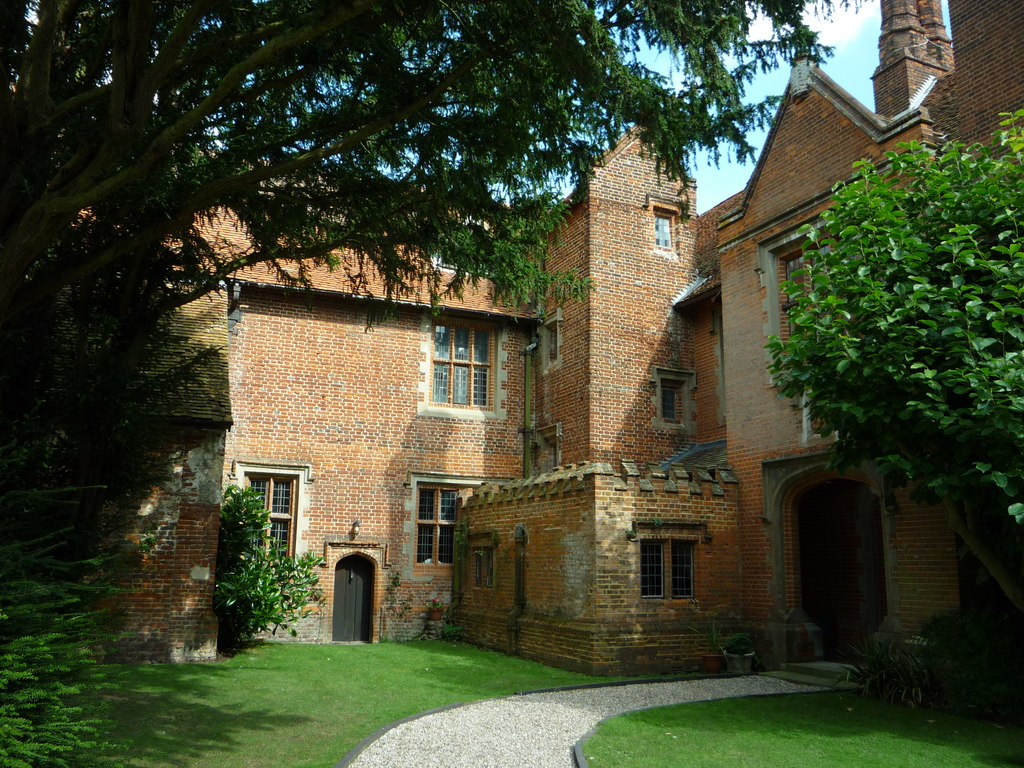
Creeksea Place

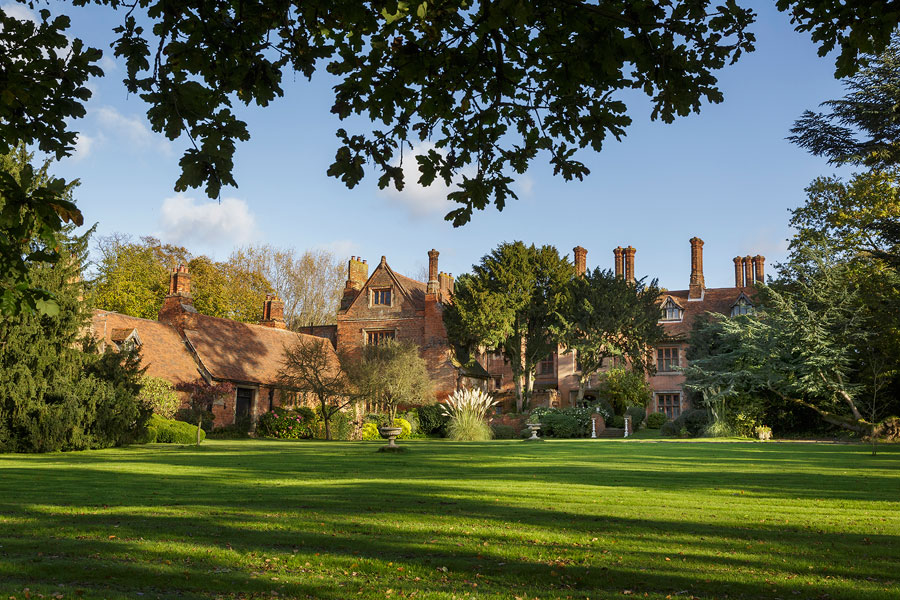

Creeksea Place is located near to the town of Burnham-on-Crouch in the Essex countryside of eastern England. Originally built in 1569, the estate retains many original internal and external features, with an original walled-garden and untouched orchard, where the BBC’s adaptation of Great Expectations was filmed. Creeksea Place is owned by Jon-Paul Bertorelli Lindsey.

== History ==
In its original form Creeksea Place (built by Sir Arthur Harris) probably consisted of three, or possibly, four wings surrounding a courtyard with the longest wing running from north to south. An original lead rain-water head, complete with the date ‘1569’ moulded on its face side, still exists today. Sadly, in about 1740, the south part of the house, together with the enclosing walls of the garden were dismantled and the materials sold, leaving standing only the outer courtyard enclosure, the North range and the West wing. The house was restored in modern times with a new range built on the foundations of the original East wing and various other additions were made by the Rome family. However a number of original features still exist such as a moulded oak door frame, original windows with brick mullions, transoms and square moulded labels and superb chimney stacks with octagonal shafts.

Creeksea Place was reputed to have been the home of Anne Boleyn. Her spirit was said to have been seen walking from an old cottage near the Cricksea ferry. Her daughter, Queen Elizabeth, is thought to have met her soldiers here and that they were supposed to have come to meet her through a tunnel connected with Rochford. Great Tudor drains, full of oyster shells have been uncovered but not the tunnel itself. Sir Henry Mildmay, Keeper of the Crown Jewels for Charles I married into the Harris family and, by the laws of the day, eventually became the owner of Creeksea Place. He is reputed to have been one of the twelve State elders who subsequently signed King Charles's death warrant. Following the execution and after the accession to the throne of Charles II, Sir Henry was said to have been arrested at Creeksea and he and the other eleven elders were accused of regicide (the murder of a king or queen), later pardoned but it is said, to make sure they did not forget the enormity of their crime, all twelve were obliged to spend the anniversary date of the King's execution in the Tower of London.

The Great Sword of Creeksea Place, now in safekeeping, had rested for nearly three hundred years on a platform at the head of the oak spiral staircase which led up to the attics of the old house. It a court sword of the early 17th century, its hilt and pommel being covered with chased silver in various designs, the Tudor rose being the most prominent. It is said that one man alone, with the sword in his hand, could have held the stairs against all comers, and protected the women and children of the house from assailants.

A short distance from Creeksea Place at grid reference TQ930969 is the parish church of All Saints, entirely rebuilt in 1878, but retaining features from the original church built on the site, such as the 14th century South doorway, cinquefoiled ogee lights on either side of the archway and various artifacts within the church. The square stone bowl of the original font, believed to date from the year 1125, was found on the Cricksea glebe being used as a step to the barn. The church stands behind the building known as Creeksea Hall (TQ931969), another building of considerable vintage, and all to be found in the area of Essex known as the Dengie Hundred.

Following brief occupation by Lindisfarne College, Creeksea Place was used by British military units during World War II. The house is currently undergoing a full and complete renovation by the owner to allow the public to once again experience the beauty of the building. Creeksea Place is now a Grade II8 listed building.
