= Charles Goodwin (of Rowfant) =

English landowner and High Sheriff of Sussex

High Sheriff of Sussex

Personal details
- Born: 1658
- Died: 1731 (aged 72–73)
- Resting place: St Nicholas' Church, Worth
- Spouse: Mary Mildmay

Charles Goodwin (of Rowfant) (1658–1731) was an English landowner who lived in the historic house of Rowfant in Sussex and served as High Sheriff of Sussex.

== Life ==
Sir Robert Goodwin (1601–1681), MP for East Grinstead, had no surviving children, so his estate of Rowfant in the parish of Worth, Sussex passed to his brother John Goodwin (1605–1674). His eldest son was Deane Goodwin (1635–1660), who married Thomasine Oldfield and had two sons. The elder was Deane Goodwin (1658–1692), MP for Reigate, and the younger was Charles Goodwin, who inherited the estate on the death of his brother. In 1716 he served as High Sheriff of Sussex, the most senior official in the county. He was buried in the church of St Nicholas at Worth on 14 June 1731 and his will of 19 November 1729 with a codicil of 26 November 1730 was proved in London on 5 July 1731. His memorial in Worth church reads:

Here lyes the body of Mary daughter of Henry Mildemay of Graces in the county of Essex Esq and late beloved wife of Charles Goodwin of Rowvant in this parish Esq She departed on the 17th day of Jan 1723 in the 65 year of her age … Here lyeth the body of Charles Goodwin Esq of this parish who died 9 June 1731 aged 74 years.

In addition to his prime estate of Rowfant, he also inherited from his brother lands in Somerset at Wanstrow and Muchelney, in the latter parish the so-called manors of Neales, Barramores and Knowles. All went after his death to his nephew John and John's daughters.

== Family ==
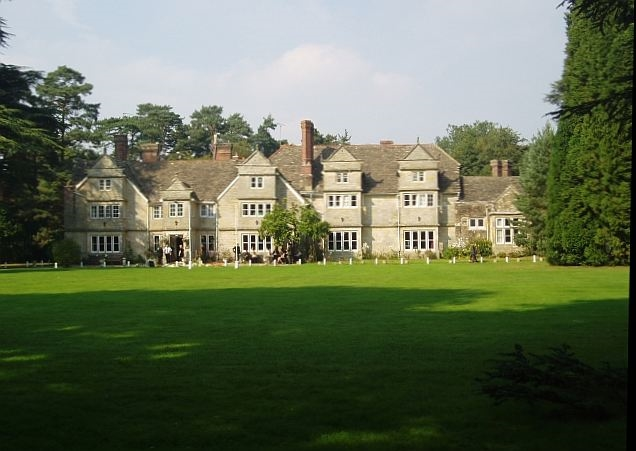
Rowfant House

After obtaining a licence on 11 December 1691, on 17 December 1691 in the church of Saint Martin-in-the-Fields in Westminster, he married Mary (1660–1724), daughter of Sir Henry Mildmay of Graces, MP for Essex and his second wife Mary. As they did not have any children, he made his nephew John Phillips (1687–1736 ), the son of his sister Catherine Goodwin and her husband Walter Phillips, his heir. John, who changed his name to Goodwin, in 1726 married Mary (1703–1774), the daughter of Thomas Watson and his wife Mary Sturgin.

John and Mary had two daughters, Catherine Goodwin (1729–1742) and Mary Goodwin (1731–1762), who became the heiresses of Rowfant and the Somerset properties on his death in 1736 but did not marry. In 1739 their widowed mother took a second husband, the Reverend Andrew Bethune (1705–1767), and with him had two more daughters, Anna Bethune (1740–1794) and Catherine Bethune (1745–1808), who became the heiresses in turn. Anna never married but in 1771 Catherine married her first cousin, the Reverend George Bethune (1746–1803), rector of Worth, and their eldest son, the Reverend George Maximilian Bethune (1772–1840), inherited the estates. Rowfant remained in the family until 1849, when it was sold to Sir Curtis Miranda Lampson, 1st Baronet.
