= Literature and Dogma =

Matthew Arnold book

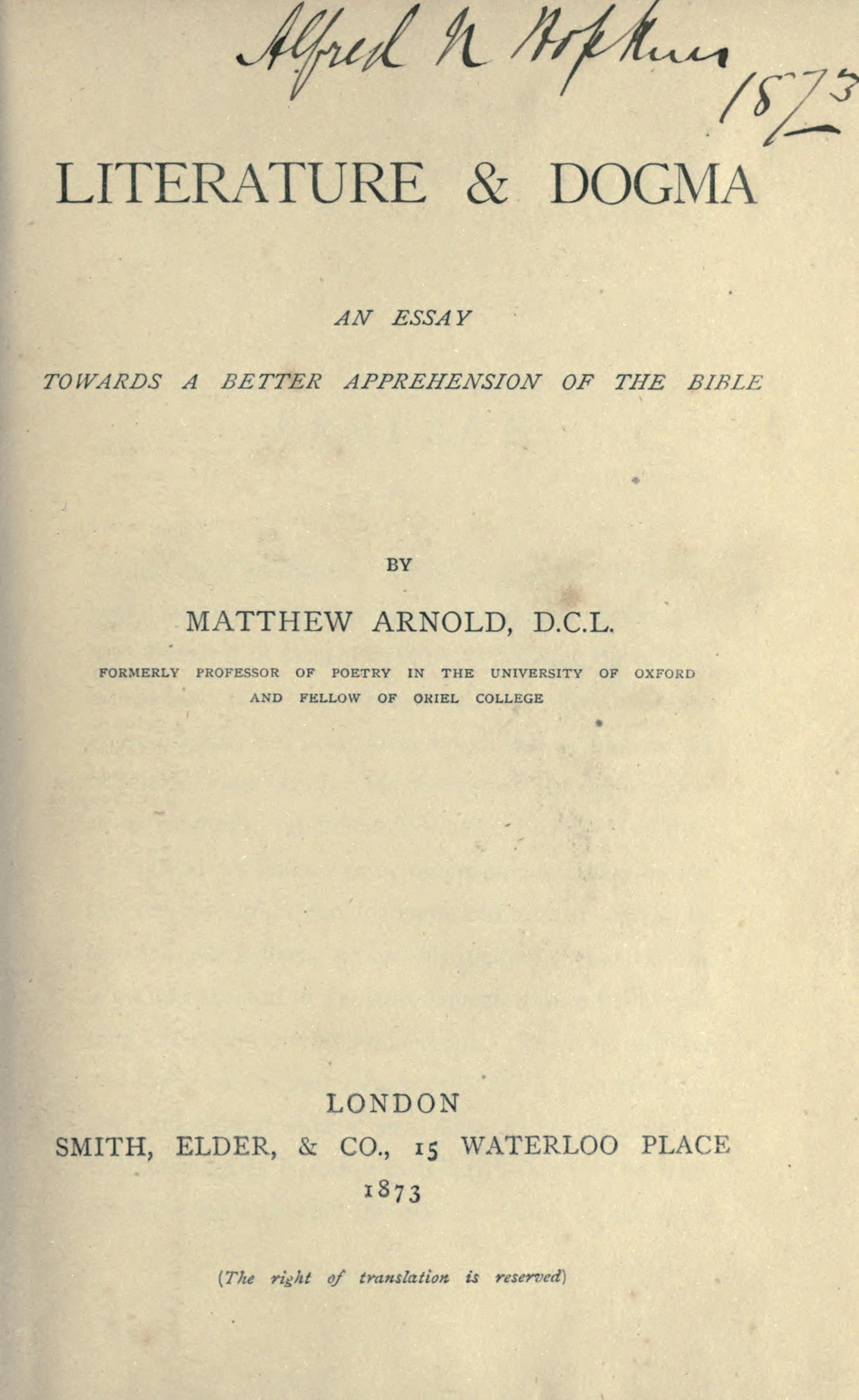
- Title page of the first edition
- Text: Literature and Dogma at Wikisource

Literature and Dogma: An Essay towards a better Apprehension of the Bible is a work of religious and literary criticism by Matthew Arnold, first published in February 1873.

== Summary ==
=== Introduction, Chapter I ===
Arnold begins with noting the difference between literary and scientific terms as they are employed in the Bible, illustrating his position by the different ways in which the term God is understood. "People use it", he says, "as if it stood for a perfectly definite and ascertained idea, from which we might … extract propositions and draw inferences, just as we should from any other definite and ascertained idea. … But, in truth, the word 'God' is used in most cases—not by the Bishops of Winchester and Gloucester, but by mankind in general—as by no means a term of science or exact knowledge, but a term of poetry and eloquence, a term thrown out, so to speak, at a not fully grasped object of the speaker's consciousness,—a literary term, in short; and mankind means different things by it as their consciousness differs."

=== Chapter II ===
"Righteousness tendeth to life" – Proverbs 11.19

Among the Jews was found the feeling of the importance of conduct; they had a stronger admiration of righteousness, or, rather, their admiration was less complicated by admiration of other things than was the case with other peoples. Their idea of God, Arnold says, was as The Eternal, the not ourselves which makes for righteousness. Later there arose among the Jews a different notion of what their God was going to bring to them; instead of calmly accepting the fact that "righteousness tendeth to life", they looked for some more tangible result as a reward for their right doing; at first it was nothing but a vague, indefinite longing, hardly different from hope, but in time it changed into a belief in material progress.

=== Chapter III ===
Then came Christianity with its new message to man, that of the necessity of personal religion. "Christ made his followers first look within and examine themselves; he made them feel that they had a best and real self as opposed to their ordinary and apparent one, and that their happiness depended on saving themselves from being overborne. And then, by recommending, and still more by himself exemplifying in his own practice, by the exhibition in himself, with the most prepossessing pureness, clearness, and beauty, of the two qualities by which our ordinary self is indeed most essentially counteracted, self renouncement and mildness, he made his followers feel that in these qualities lay the secret of their best self; that to attain them was in the highest degree requisite and natural, and that a man's happiness depended upon it." In this way "was the great doctrine of the Old Testament, To righteousness belongs happiness! made a true and potent word again." In time, however, arose the belief that "the mild, inward, self-renouncing, and sacrificed Servant of the Eternal, the new and better Messiah, was yet, before the present generation passed, to come on the clouds of heaven in power and glory." Since the Advent failed to come then, it was supposed that it would arrive at a later time; "the future and the miraculous engaged the chief attention of Christians; and in accordance with this strain of thought, they more and more rested the proof of Christianity, not on its internal evidence, but on prediction and miracle."

=== Chapters IV–V ===
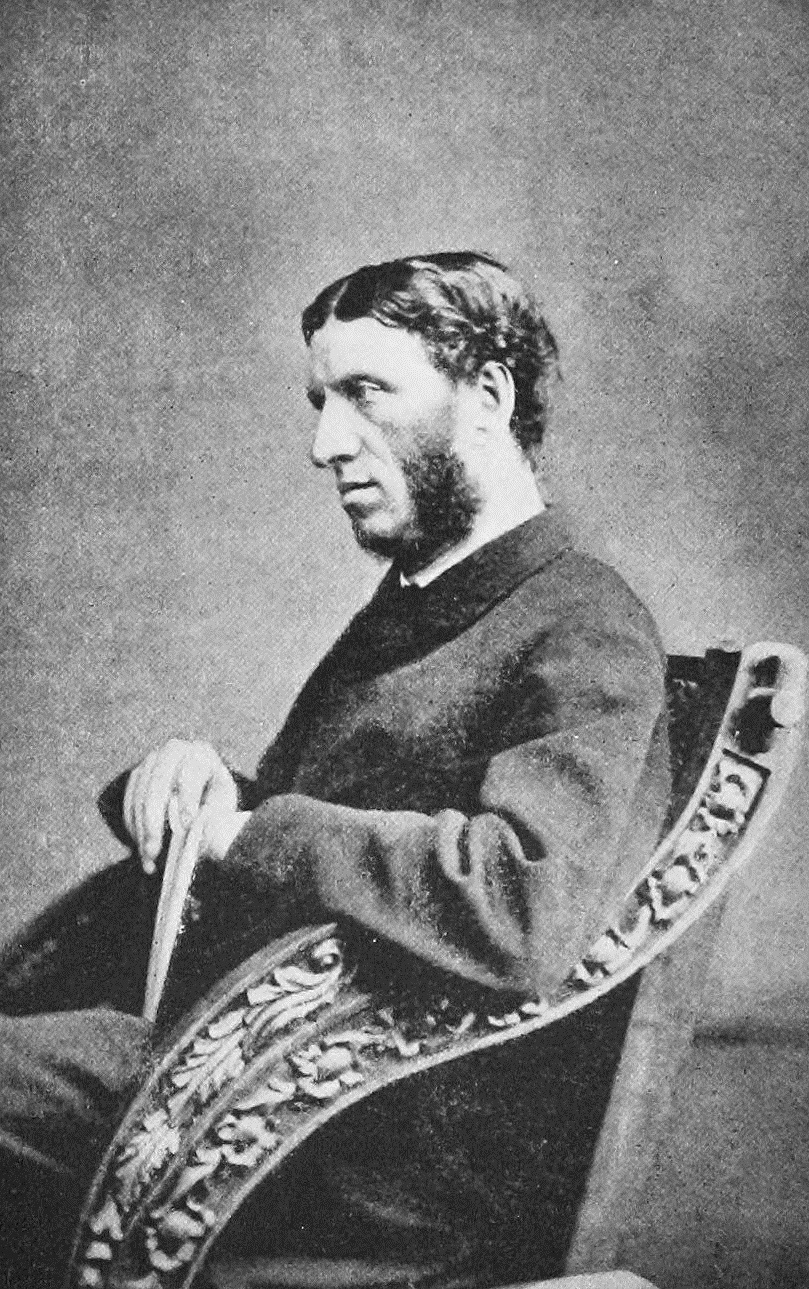
Arnold in 1869

Then follow two chapters, one on the proof from prophecy, the other on proof from miracles. Arnold contents himself with showing the possibility of error under which those who have given us an account of them laboured, and how uncertain is the test which the mind of the Christian applies to their examination. His method may be compared with that of Strauss and the Tübingen school, in this matter of miracles.

=== Chapters VI–VII ===
The two chapters which follow are entitled, respectively, "The New Testament Record" and "The Testimony of Jesus to himself". According to Arnold, there is no call for profound historical or philological study to aid in the treatment of the questions which come up; we have the account of one man, who, it might almost be said, is nearly a contemporary of ours, in comparison with the ancient Israelites; we have often his very words, and, although they will carry a different meaning to every heart, varying with the nature and experience of the individual, they nevertheless were spoken directly to men; they were not designed as subjects for abstruse discussion or dogmatic reasoning.

=== Chapters VIII–X ===
The two following chapters, "The Early Witnesses" ("Faith in Christ") and "Aber glaube re-invading", discuss the later books of the New Testament, and the appearance and spread of certain of the dogmas of the Church. He gives instances of the way in which literal criticism has perverted the true meaning of texts, and draws an outline of the main differences between Catholicism and Protestantism. This is followed by a chapter entitled "Our 'Masses' and the Bible".

=== Chapter XI ===
This chapter is titled 'The True Greatness of the Old Testament'

=== Chapter XII ===
In his chapter, "The true Greatness of Christianity," Arnold writes: "But there is this difference between the religion of the Old Testament and Christianity. Of the religion of the Old Testament we can pretty well see to the end; we can trace fully enough the experimental proof of it in history. But of Christianity the future is as yet almost unknown. For that the world cannot get on without righteousness we have the clear experience, and a grand and admirable experience it is. But what the world will become by the thorough use of that which is really righteousness, the method and the secret and the secret reasonableness of Jesus, we have as yet hardly any experience at all."

== Analysis ==
Editors of Critics of the Bible, 1724–1873 describe Literature and Dogma as Matthew Arnold’s best work of religious criticism and note that it remained influential for several decades, particularly among Anglican and Catholic modernists, as well as Leo Tolstoy.

The same editorial summary links the genesis of the work to a concentrated period of composition in June 1870 and situates it within Arnold’s ongoing engagement with questions of culture and religion during this phase of his career.

A contemporary review in The North American Review (1873) examined Arnold’s method of scriptural criticism, focusing on his analysis of traditional arguments from prophecy and miracles and situating his approach within broader nineteenth-century debates over biblical interpretation.

Subsequent scholarship has explored the intellectual background of Literature and Dogma and the critical context in which it was produced, emphasizing the influences and controversies that informed its argumentative framework.

Studies of the work’s publication history have also drawn attention to the development of its argument across successive instalments, noting shifts in emphasis as Arnold elaborated his position over the course of composition.

== Sources ==
- Drury, John, ed. (1989). "8. Literature and Dogma (1873), IV–VI". Critics of the Bible, 1724–1873. Cambridge University Press. pp. 152–92. doi:10.1017/CBO9780511597596. ISBN 9780521338707.

Attribution:

- "[Review of Literature and Dogma, by M. Arnold]". The North American Review. 117 (240): 240–7. 1873. JSTOR 25109767.
