= John Pelham (bishop) =

Bishop of Norwich

The Right Reverend and Honourable John Pelham
- Bishop of Norwich
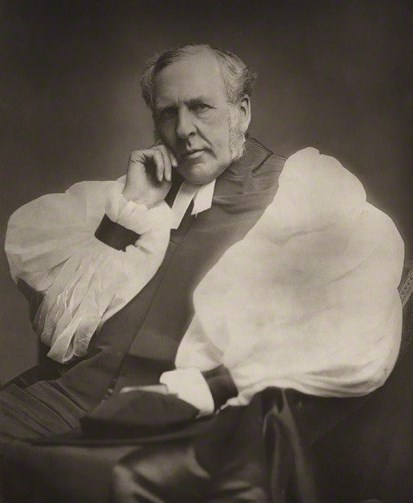
- Diocese: Diocese of Norwich
- In office: 1857–1893
- Predecessor: Samuel Hinds
- Successor: John Sheepshanks

Personal details
- Born: 21 June 1811
- Died: 1 May 1894 (aged 82)
- Denomination: Anglican
- Education: Westminster School
- Alma mater: Christ Church, Oxford

Rt. Rev. The Hon. John Thomas Pelham (21 June 1811 – 1 May 1894) was a British Anglican clergyman.

== Background and education ==
He was the third son of Thomas Pelham, 2nd Earl of Chichester and his wife Lady Mary Henrietta Juliana Osborne, eldest daughter of Francis Osborne, 5th Duke of Leeds. His older brothers were Henry Pelham, 3rd Earl of Chichester and Frederick Thomas Pelham, a rear-admiral in the Royal Navy. Pelham was educated at Westminster School and went then to Christ Church, Oxford, where he graduated with a Bachelor of Arts in 1832 and Master of Arts four years thereafter. In 1857, he received a Doctor of Divinity by the University of Oxford.

== Career ==
Pelham was ordained by Charles James Blomfield, at that time Bishop of London, in 1834 and assumed the post as deacon of Eastergate, befriending Henry Edward Manning. In 1837, he was appointed rector at Bergh Apton until 1852, when he was transferred as curate to Christ Church, Hampstead. After three years, he became rector of Marylebone and in 1857 on the resignation of Samuel Hinds, he was consecrated the 64th Bishop of Norwich. From 1847, he served as chaplain to Queen Victoria. Pelham retired as bishop in 1893 and spent the next year in Thorpe St Andrew.

== Family and death ==
On 6 November 1845, Pelham married Henrietta Tatton, second daughter of Thomas William Tatton, and had by her four sons and a daughter. His oldest child was the scholar Henry Francis Pelham. He died in 1894 and is commemorated by a monument in Norwich Cathedral.

== Footnotes ==
Church of England titles
| Preceded by Samuel Hinds | Bishop of Norwich; 1857 – 1893 | Succeeded by John Sheepshanks |
