= Bishop of Barrow-in-Furness =

Anglican suffragan bishop in England

The Bishop of Barrow-in-Furness was an episcopal title used by a suffragan bishop of the Church of England Diocese of Carlisle, in the Province of York, England. The See was created by Order in Council on 6 April 1889 (under the Suffragans Nomination Act 1888) and took its name after the town of Barrow-in-Furness in Cumbria. Since 1944, the title has been in abeyance.

== List of bishops ==
Bishops of Barrow-in-Furness
From	Until	Incumbent	Notes
1889	1909	Henry Ware	Held in plurality with a Residentiary Canonry at Carlisle Cathedral. Died in Office, buried in the English Cemetery, Rome.
1909	1926	Campbell West-Watson	Held in plurality with a Residentiary Canonry at Carlisle Cathedral until 1921, then with the Rectory of Aldingham, near Ulverston, Cumbria. Became Bishop of Christchurch, New Zealand.
1926	1944	Herbert Sidney Pelham	Held in plurality with the Rectory of Aldingham. Died in Office, buried in Aldingham Churchyard. A portrait of him hangs in the chancel of the church.
1944	present	in abeyance	
Source(s): Crockford's Clerical Directory: 2. D.H.Marston : "The Bishopric of Barrow-in-Furness" (2016)

== See also ==
- Barrow-in-Furness
- List of places of worship in Barrow-in-Furness
