= Herbert Pelham =

The Rt Revd Herbert Sidney Pelham
- Bishop of Barrow-in-Furness
- Church: Church of England
- In office: 1926–1944
- Predecessor: Campbell West-Watson
- Successor: In abeyance

Orders
- Consecration: 1926

Personal details
- Born: June 25, 1881
- Died: March 11, 1944
- Denomination: Anglican
- Parents: Henry Francis Pelham and Laura Priscilla Buxton
- Education: Harrow School; University College, Oxford

Rt Rev Herbert Sidney Pelham (25 June 1881 – 11 March 1944) was the third Bishop of Barrow-in-Furness from 1926 until his death in 1944.

Pelham was the third son of classical scholar Henry Francis Pelham and Laura Priscilla Buxton, daughter of Sir Edward Buxton, 2nd Baronet. His grandfather was Bishop of Norwich Hon. John Thomas Pelham, third son of the 3rd Earl of Chichester. His elder brother was civil servant Sir Edward Henry Pelham.

He was educated at Harrow School and University College, Oxford, his first posts after ordination were at inner-city Missions. After which he was Chaplain to Henry Wakefield, Bishop of Birmingham, Head of the Harrow Mission, and Vicar of Barking- a post he held until 1926 when he was elevated to the episcopate. He was the author of the book The Training of a Working Boy.

Church of England titles
Preceded by Campbell West-Watson	Bishop of Barrow-in-Furness; 1926–1944	In abeyance ever since
