= Charles Rich, 4th Earl of Warwick =

The Right Honourable Charles Rich
- Earl of Warwick
- Coat of arms
- Tenure: 1659–1673
- Predecessor: Robert Rich, 3rd Earl of Warwick
- Successor: Robert Rich, 5th Earl of Warwick
- Born: c. 1623
- Died: 24 August 1673 (aged 49–50)
- Spouse: Lady Mary Boyle (m. 1641)
- Issue: Charles Rich; Elizabeth Rich
- Father: Robert Rich, 2nd Earl of Warwick
- Mother: Frances Hatton

Charles Rich, 4th Earl of Warwick (abt 1623 – 24 Aug 1673), styled The Honourable Charles Rich until 1658, was an English peer and politician.

Rich was the second son of Robert Rich, 2nd Earl of Warwick and Frances Hatton. As a young man, he was noted for being handsome, charming, cheerful and penniless. His wife was Lady Mary Boyle, daughter of Richard Boyle, 1st Earl of Cork, and his second wife Catherine Fenton. He became intimate with Lady Mary when he helped to nurse her through an attack of measles. It was a love marriage: Mary to her father's intense displeasure, had refused to enter the marriage arranged by him with James Hamilton, later Earl of Clanbrassil, on the grounds that she found him repulsive, and chose Charles instead. Her father who was genuinely fond of her despite their differences eventually gave his consent, as well as a generous dowry, but the couple do not seem to have been happy. Mary in her diaries refers to "violent and passionate disputes". There may have been faults on both sides, since Mary was exceptionally stubborn and strong-minded (as shown by her defiance of her formidable father), and in later years became almost fanatically devout, but it was generally agreed that the greater blame lay with Rich, whose chronic ill-health made him bad-tempered and tyrannical.

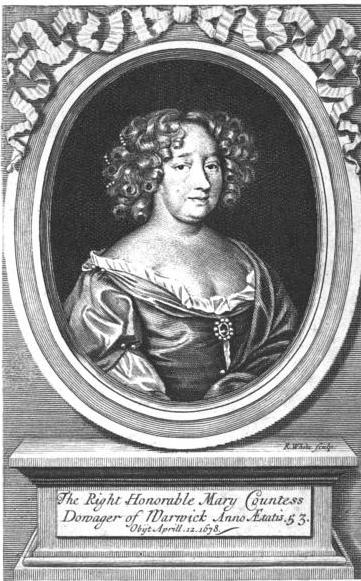
Mary, Countess of Warwick

In public life, Rich represented Sandwich in Parliament from 1645 to 1648. He was also Custos Rotulorum of Essex. He succeeded his brother Robert in the earldom in 1659 after his brother's death 29 May 1659.

Lord Warwick died in 1673, after "twenty years of gout". His only son had predeceased him and had no children by his wife Anne Cavendish, so the title passed to his cousin, Robert Rich, 2nd Earl of Holland. His only other child Elizabeth had died in infancy. Despite their quarrels, he left all his property to his widow for her life, an unusual step at the time. The love of his life died five years later.

Parliament of England
Preceded by Sir Edward Partridge	Member of Parliament for Sandwich; 1645–1648; With: Sir Edward Partridge	Succeeded by Unrepresented in the Rump Parliament
Political offices
Preceded by James Hay, 2nd Earl of Carlisle	Custos Rotulorum of Essex; 1660–1673	Succeeded by William Maynard, 2nd Baron Maynard
Peerage of England
Preceded by Robert Rich	Earl of Warwick; 1659–1673	Succeeded by Robert Rich
