= Henry Mildmay =

English politician

Sir Henry Mildmay (ca. 1593–1668) was an English politician who sat in the House of Commons at various times between 1621 and 1659. He supported the Parliamentarian cause in the English Civil War and was one of the Regicides of Charles I of England.

Mildmay was knighted in 1617, and made Master of the Jewel Office in 1618. In 1621, Mildmay was elected Member of Parliament for Maldon. He was elected MP for Westbury in 1624 and Maldon again in 1625 and 1628. He sat until 1629 when King Charles decided to rule without parliament for eleven years He attended Charles I on a visit to Scotland in 1639.

In April 1640, Mildmay was elected MP for Maldon in the Short Parliament. He was re-elected MP for Maldon in the Long Parliament in November 1640 He supported Parliament during the Civil War and was a revenue commissioner between 1645 and 1652. In 1646, he was left as a hostage in Scotland. He remained in the Rump Parliament after Pride's Purge and was present at the trial of King Charles I.

Mildmay was a member of the Councils of State from 1649 until 1652. By order of parliament in 1649, he was to 'melt down all the gold and silver [in the Crown Jewels] and sell all the jewels to the best advantage of the Commonwealth.' His nephew, Carew Mildmay, resisted the instructions and was imprisoned, while Henry himself stayed away. He was afterwards called 'the knave of diamonds' for the destruction. He was called to account upon the restoration of the monarchy in 1660 and attempted to escape. He was disgraced and sentenced to imprisonment for life. In 1664, a warrant was issued for his transportation to Tangier, where he died four years later.

== Biography ==
Mildmay was second son of Humphrey Mildmay (d. 1613) of Danbury Place, Essex, by Mary (1560–1633), daughter of Henry Capel of Little Hadham, Hertfordshire, He was brought up at court, and excelled in all manly exercises. In 1610 he matriculated at Emmanuel College, Cambridge (founded by his grandfather, Sir Walter Mildmay), graduating in 1612. Clarendon terms him a "great flatterer of all persons in authority, and a spy in all places for them", On 9 August 1617 Mildmay, being then one of the king's sewers, was knighted at Kendal. In 1619 he made a wealthy match, through the king's good offices, and bought Wanstead House, Essex, from George Villiers, Marquis of Buckingham, where he entertained James I in June of that year.

In April 1620, he was appointed Master of the King's Jewel House, on 8 August following entered Gray's Inn, and was elected M.P. for Maldon, Essex, of which he became chief steward on 20 December. He was chosen one of the tilters before the king on the anniversary of his accession, 24 March 1622. On 3 February 1624 he was returned to the Happy Parliament for Westbury, Wiltshire.

In the first parliament of King Charles I's reign (convened on 12 April 1625), Sir Henry sat again for Maldon (known as the Useless Parliament). He also represented Maldon in the parliament of 1627–8, and in the Short and Long parliaments of 1640. In parliament he took part in the great debate on the foreign policy of the crown, 6 August 1625, when, as a friend of Buckingham, he proposed a vote of money for completing the equipment of the fleet against Spain.

As keeper of the jewel house, Mildmay helped select royal jewels for the Duke of Buckingham to pawn in October 1625, and he travelled to Amsterdam with Buckingham's secretary Sackville Crowe, hoping to raise loans from merchants to fund the navy and finance an undertaking made with Christian IV of Denmark as part of the Treaty of The Hague (1625).

On 5 May 1627, King Charles I, suspended a statute of Emmanuel College, Cambridge, for the removal of fellows at the time of commencing doctors, or within one year thereafter. Sir Henry being anxious, as grandson of the founder, to maintain the statute, offered to annexe five or six new benefices to the college within six years, and thus obtained its revocation. On 4 August 1630 he was appointed a commissioner for compounding with persons selected for knighthood, and likewise a collector.

In 1639, he accompanied Charles I on his expedition to Scotland, and maintained an interesting correspondence with Secretary Francis Windebank. As deputy-lieutenant of Robert Devereux, Earl of Essex, he endeavoured in May 1640 to collect the "conduct-money" in that county, but found the task little to his liking. On 21 April 1641, he voted against the bill for the attainder of Thomas Wentworth, Earl of Strafford.

Sir Henry eventually deserted the king, and was appointed one of the committee of the commons on 9 September 1641. The parliament, regarding him as an important acquisition, refused, despite its ordinance, to expel him for his notorious peculation (Declaration of the King concerning the Proceedings of this Present Parliament, 12 August 1642; and allowed him to retain his salary as master of the jewel-house. He made himself useful by acting as master of the ceremonies to foreign ambassadors, and was an active committeeman for Essex.

In November 1643, he got into trouble with parliament by saying of Philip, Lord Wharton, who had raised a regiment for the parliamentary service, and subsequently became a member of the council of state, "that he had made his peace at Oxon, and therefore was not fit to be entrusted with any public trust". After endeavouring to shift the blame on Lord Murray he thought it prudent to absent himself from the house. (It was not he but a cousin Sir Henry Mildmay of Woodham Walters and Moulsham who on 17 June 1645 vainly claimed, by petition, the barony of Fitzwalter; From 1645 to 1652, he was a commissioner for the revenue.

By reason of his wealth, Sir Henry was one of the hostages left with the Scots in December 1646. In January 1648, on the debate upon the letters of the Scottish commissioners, he made a long speech in praise of Archibald Campbell, Marquess of Argyll, and moved that the latter be paid his £10,000, and the rest of the Scottish debts be continued at interest at 8 per cent. For his "good service" in Hampshire at the trial of Captain John Burley he received the thanks of parliament on 2 February 1648.

Sir Henry was nominated one of the King's judges, and attended the trial on 23 January 1649, but abstained from signing the warrant. He was a member of the councils of state elected in 1649, 1650, 1651, and 1652, and sat on the committee appointed to consider the formation of a West India Company, and the regulation of the fishing upon the British coasts. In July 1649, parliament ordered the sum of £2,000. which he had lent to King Charles I to be repaid him with interest from the fund accumulated by sales of cathedral lands.

When, in the summer of 1650, news reached London that King Charles II had landed in Scotland, Sir Henry, who had often been sent on a commission to inquire into the state of the late king's three younger children, suggested, as a matter of public safety, that they should be immured in Carisbrooke Castle, of which his brother Anthony was governor. Thenceforward he ceased to take a prominent part in affairs, though he signed the remonstrance promoted on 22 September 1656 by Sir Arthur Hesilrige on behalf of the excluded members.

On 15 May 1660, Sir Henry was ordered, to attend the committee appointed to consider Charles II's reception, and give an account of the whereabouts of the crowns, robes, sceptres, and jewels belonging to the King. He attempted to escape abroad, but was seized by Lord Winchelsea at Rye, Sussex, and was excepted out of the General Pardon Bill. On his petition he was ordered to be committed to the custody of the serjeant-at-arms instead of to the Tower of London. On 1 July 1661 he was brought to the bar of the House of Commons, and after evidence had been produced against him, and he had been made to confess his guilt, he was degraded from his honours and titles. He was likewise sentenced to be drawn every year on the anniversary of the King's sentence (27 January) upon a sledge through the streets to and under the gallows at Tyburn, with a rope about his neck, and so back to the Tower, there to remain a prisoner during his life. In a petition to the House of Lords, dated 25 July, he prayed for commiseration, alleging that he was present at the trial only to seek some opportunity of saving the king's life.

On 31 March 1664, a warrant was issued for Mildmay's transportation to Tangier, but on account of his feeble health he was allowed a servant. He is often recorded to have died, shortly after setting out on the journey, between April 1664 and May 1665 at Antwerp. However, this is apparently based on a mistranscription from a contemporary source, and he in fact died at English Tangier circa 1668. Most of his vast accumulations were forfeited to the crown, his estate at Wanstead being granted to James, Duke of York.

== Surviving papers ==
In the British Library are Mildmay's letters to Sir Thomas Barrington in 1643 (Egerton MSS. 2643, 2647), letter to the parliamentary committee at Southampton in 1645, and a guarantee on a loan for pay of troops in Essex in 1643 (Egerton MS. 2651, f. 146); there are also letters of his in the Tanner MSS. in the Bodleian Library (Lords' Journals, vols. vi. x).

== Family ==
In April 1619, Henry Mildmay married Anne, daughter and coheiress of William Holliday, alderman of London. They had two sons: William (b 1623), and Henry, who was admitted of Gray's Inn on 26 April 1656, and three daughters: Susan, Anne, and Mary.

== Notes ==
Parliament of England
Preceded by Sir John Sammes; Charles Chiborne	Member of Parliament for Maldon; 1621; With: Julius Caesar	Succeeded by Sir William Masham, Bt; Sir Arthur Harris
Preceded by Walter Long; Sir Miles Fleetwood	Member of Parliament for Westbury; 1624; With: Sir John Saye	Succeeded by Sir Walter Long; Thomas Hopton
Preceded by Sir William Masham, Bt; Sir Arthur Harris	Member of Parliament for Maldon; 1625; With: Sir William Masham, Bt;	Succeeded by Sir William Masham, Bt; Sir Thomas Cheek
Preceded by Sir William Masham, Bt; Sir Thomas Cheek	Member of Parliament for Maldon; 1628–1629; With: Sir Arthur Harris	Parliament suspended until 1640
Vacant Parliament suspended since 1629	Member of Parliament for Maldon; 1640–1653; With: John Porter 1640; Sir John Clotworthy 1640–1648	Not represented in Barebones Parliament
