= Edward Turnour (speaker) =

British politician (1617–1676)

Sir Edward Turnor
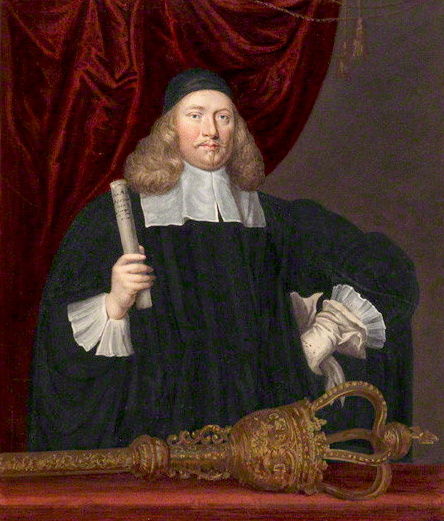
- Born: 1617
- Died: 4 March 1676 (aged 58–59); Bedford
- Predecessor: Arthur Turnor (his father)
- Successor: Edward Turnor (his son)
- Spouse(s): Sarah Gore (first wife), Mary Ewer (second wife)
- Children: 4 sons (2 died during his lifetime), 2 daughters

Sir Edward Turnor or Turnour (1617 – 4 March 1676) of Little Parndon, Essex, was a Speaker of the House of Commons of England under the reign of King Charles II, chief baron of the Exchequer, and Attorney-General to the Duke of York from 1660.

== Early life ==
Edward Turnor was son of Arthur Turnor of Little Parndon. Passing from John Roysse's Free School in Abingdon (now Abingdon School) in 1632 to Queen's College, Oxford. He succeeded his father to the estate at Little Parndon in 1651.

== Career ==
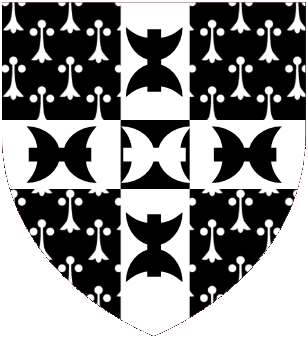
Shield of arms displayed at speaker's house.

He became a barrister, called at Middle Temple, and Member of Parliament in turn for Essex (1654–1661) and Hertford (1661–1671). It was while Turnor sat for Hertford that he served as Speaker of the Commons (1661–1671) and Solicitor General (1670–1671). He was knighted in (1660).

According to Geoffrey Robertson (in his book, The Tyrannicide Brief), a "Sir Edward Turner" (sic) was a "Counsel for the Victim" (the Duke of York) in the 1660 regicide trials. Evidence supporting the argument that Robertson misspelt "Turnour" as "Turner" includes the entry for Sir Edward Turnour provided in "The judges of England, from the time of the Conquest" by Edward Foss.

Turnor was one of the judges appointed under the Fire of London Disputes Act 1666 to deal with property disputes arising as a result of the Great Fire of London.

He died on circuit in Bedford on 4 Mar 1676 and was buried at Little Parndon. He had married twice and left 2 sons and 2 daughters.

His son Edward Turnour was MP for Orford, Suffolk, and married Isobel Keith, daughter of William Keith, 6th Earl Marischal.

== See also ==
- List of Old Abingdonians

Parliament of England
Preceded by Harbottle Grimston	Speaker of the House of Commons; 1661–1671	Succeeded by Sir Job Charlton, 1st Baronet
Legal offices
Preceded by Sir Matthew Hale	Lord Chief Baron of the Exchequer; 1671–1676	Succeeded by Sir William Montagu
