= Barrington baronets of Barrington Hall (1611) =

Escutcheon of the Barrington baronets of Barrington Hall

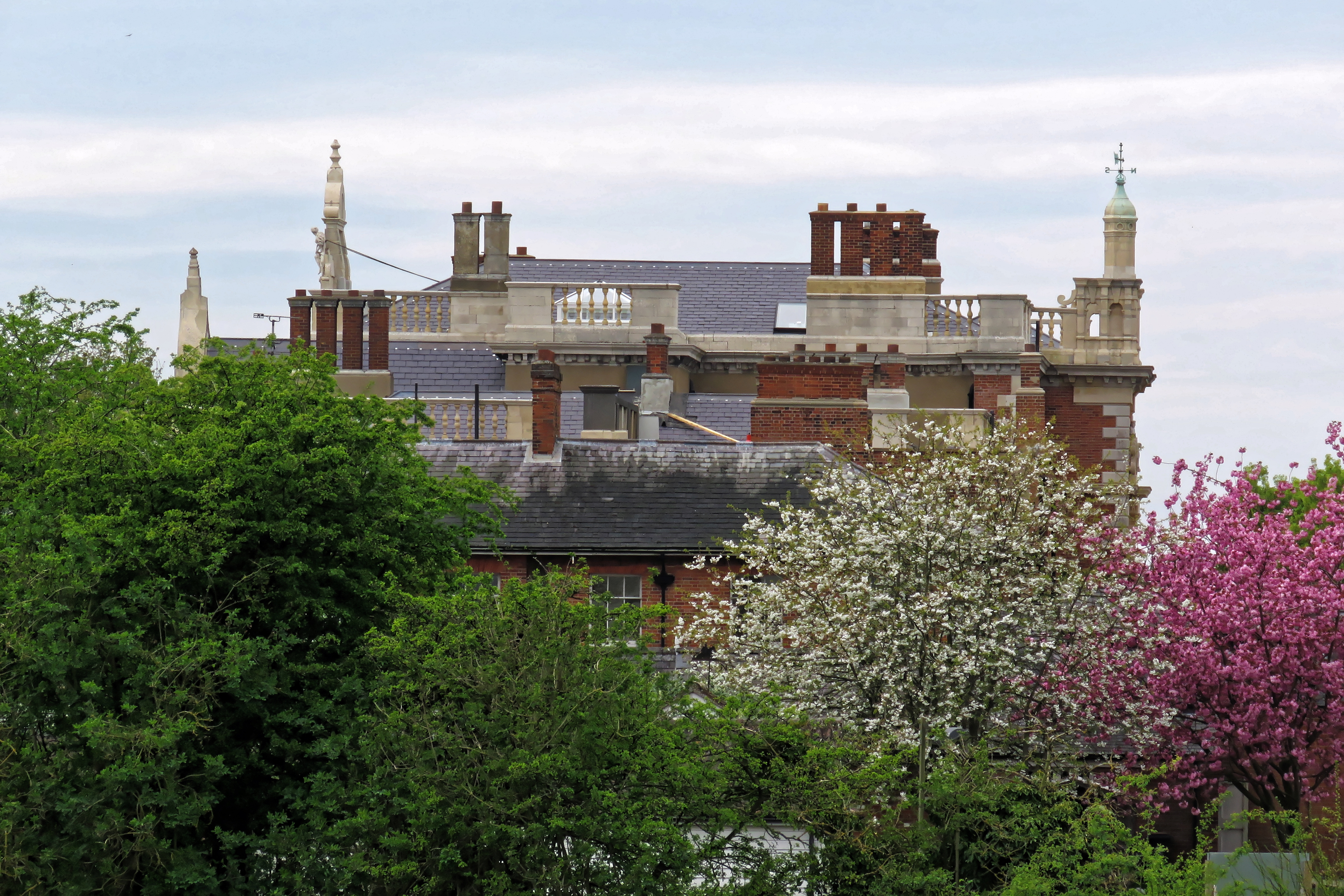
Barrington Hall, seat of the Essex Barrington Baronetcy

The Barrington Baronetcy, of Barrington Hall in the County of Essex was created in the Baronetage of England on 29 June 1611, for Francis Barrington, member of parliament (MP) for Essex.

His son, the 2nd Baronet, sat in the House of Commons for Newtown, Essex and Colchester. The 3rd Baronet was also MP for Newtown. He died in 1683, and was succeeded by his grandson, who died in turn unmarried in 1691.

The latter's younger brother, the 5th Baronet, was MP for Essex. He died childless in 1715 and the baronetcy went to a son of the younger son of the 3rd Baronet. The 7th Baronet sat for Newtown for 48 years. Since his marriage was without children, he was succeeded by his younger brother. The latter's son, the 9th Baronet, was also MP for Newtown. He died childless in 1818, and his younger brother became the next baronet. After the death of the 10th Baronet in 1832, the baronetcy became extinct.

== Barrington baronets, of Barrington Hall (1611) ==
- Sir Francis Barrington, 1st Baronet (c. 1570–1628)
- Sir Thomas Barrington, 2nd Baronet (died 1644)
- Sir John Barrington, 3rd Baronet (1605–1683)
- Sir John Barrington, 4th Baronet (1670–1691)
- Sir Charles Barrington, 5th Baronet (c. 1671–1715)
- Sir John Barrington, 6th Baronet (c. 1673–1717)
- Sir John Barrington, 7th Baronet (died 1776)
- Sir Fitzwilliam Barrington, 8th Baronet (1708–1792)
- Sir John Barrington, 9th Baronet (1752–1818)
- Sir Fitzwilliam Barrington, 10th Baronet (1755–1832)

== Notes ==
Baronetage of England
Preceded by Savage baronets	Barrington baronets 29 June 1611	Succeeded by Berkeley baronets
