= Lucy Cary =

English Benedictine nun and biographer

- Born: London, England
- Baptised: 23 December 1619
- Died: 1 November 1650; Cambrai, Flanders
- Other name: Dame Lucy Magdalena
- Occupation: Benedictine nun
- Parent(s): Henry Cary, 1st Viscount Falkland; Elizabeth Tanfield
- Relatives: Lucius Cary, 2nd Viscount Falkland (brother); Patrick Cary (brother); Anne Cary (sister)

Lucy Cary (c. 1619 – 1 November 1650) was an English Benedictine nun and biographer, under the religious name Lucy Magdalena.

== Family and early life ==
Cary was born in about 1619 and was baptised on 23 December 1619 at St Bartholomew-the-Great in London. As a child she frequented the courts of Kings James I and Charles I.

Her parents were Henry Cary, 1st Viscount Falkland, and his wife Elizabeth Cary, Viscountess Falkland. Elizabeth Cary was the only child of lawyer, politician and Lord Chief Baron of the Exchequer, Sir Lawrence Tanfield, and his wife Elizabeth Symondes of Norfolk.

Cary was fourth of eleven children and one of her sisters was Anne Cary, the Benedictine nun and writer. She was also a kinswoman of Penelope Longueville.

== Catholicism ==
Elizabeth Cary converted to Catholicism in 1626, guided by Father John Fursdon, and was placed under house arrest. Before her own conversion on Fridays Cary would wait until her mother was on the verge of eating meat and then would remind her that it was a fast day.

Cary then herself converted in 1634, the first of Elizabeth's children to do so. Cary travelled to Flanders, where she joined the Our Lady of Consolation convent at Cambrai on 31 August 1638, alongside her sister Mary Cary, Barbara Constable, Catherine Gascoigne (Dame Justina), Mary Tempest and Francis Lucy. Cary was professed in 1640.

Cary later wrote a biography of her mother entitled The Lady Falkland: Her Life by One of Her Daughters.

== Death ==
Cary died in Cambrai, Flanders on 1 November 1650.
