= John Meux =

English politician

Sir John Meux, Bt

Member of Parliament for Newtown
- In office 1640–1644 Serving with Nicholas Weston
- Preceded by: Parliament suspended since 1629
- Succeeded by: Sir John Barrington, Bt; John Bulkeley

Personal details
- Died: February 1657
- Spouse: Elizabeth Worsley
- Relations: Sir Francis Barrington, 1st Baronet (grandfather)
- Children: 5
- Parent(s): Sir William Meux; Winifred Barrington

Sir John Meux, 1st Baronet (died February 1657) was an English politician who sat in the House of Commons from 1640 to 1643. He supported the Royalist cause in the English Civil War.

== Early life ==
Meux was the son of Sir William Meux and his wife Winifred Barrington, daughter of Sir Francis Barrington, 1st Baronet of Barrington Hall, Essex.

The Meux family was descended from Sir Walter Meux, of Meaux, in France, who married Eleanor Strangways, daughter of Sir Henry Strangways and Margaret Manners (daughter of George Manners, 11th Baron Ros, and Ann St Leger, herself a daughter of Sir Thomas St Leger and Ann, sister of Kings Edward IV and Richard III and their siblings Edmund, Earl of Rutland; Elizabeth of York, Duchess of Suffolk; Margaret, Duchess of Burgundy; and George Plantagenet, 1st Duke of Clarence).

== Career ==
In April 1640, Meux was elected member of parliament for Newtown in the Short Parliament. He was re-elected MP for Newtown in the Long Parliament in November 1640 and sat until he was disabled for supporting the King in 1644. He was created baronet of Kingston on 11 December 1641.

Meux was given a fine of £375 in October 1646 by the Committee for Compounding, but it was still unpaid in 1655. IN that year, he was called before the Commissioners for Hampshire to value his estates but did not appear and was ordered to pay £50 a year. In May 1656, he petitioned Parliament asking to be assessed only on an annuity of £100 since the rest of his property had been "conveyed away for debt and to provide for his children". He renewed the petition in November 1656 when it was referred to a committee and the outcome is unknown. He died the following February.

== Personal life ==
Meux married Elizabeth Worsley, daughter of Sir Richard Worsley, 1st Baronet of Appuldurcombe. Together, they were the parents of:

- Sir William Meux, 2nd Baronet (d. c. 1697), who married Mabel Dillington, daughter of Sir Robert Dillington, Bt. of Knighton. After her death he married Elizabeth Browne, daughter of George Browne, of Buckland, Surrey.
- Henry Meux (d. 1701), who died unmarried.
- John Meux (d. 1649)
- Anne Meux (d. 1728), who died unmarried.
- Elizabeth Meux, who died unmarried before her sister, Anne.

He was succeeded by his eldest son William. Upon the death of his grandson, Sir William Meux, 3rd Baronet, in 1706, the baronetcy became extinct. It was revived in 1831, however, for Henry Meux, the great-great-grandson of his younger brother.

Parliament of England
Vacant Parliament suspended since 1629	Member of Parliament for Newtown; 1640–1644; With: Nicholas Weston 1640–1642	Succeeded by Sir John Barrington, Bt; John Bulkeley
Baronetage of England
New creation	Baronet (of Kingston); 1641–1657	Succeeded by William Meux
