= Roland Lytton =

English lawyer and politician

Sir Rowland Lytton (also Roland Litton) (28 September 1561 – 23 June 1615) was an English lawyer and politician who sat in the House of Commons variously between 1586 and 1611.

== Life ==
Rowland Lytton was the only son of Rowland Lytton of Knebworth, Hertfordshire, and his second wife, Anne Carleton, daughter of John Carleton of Brightwell Baldwin, Oxfordshire, and sister of George Carleton.

He was admitted to Caius College, Cambridge in 1576 at the age of 14, and to Gray's Inn in 1579. He succeeded his father in 1582.

Lytton was a Member of Parliament for Truro, Cornwall from 1586 to 1587. He was a Justice of the Peace for Hertfordshire in 1587 to his death and Sheriff of Hertfordshire for 1594–1595. He was MP for Hertfordshire from 1597 to 1598. In 1603, he was knighted and was MP for Hertfordshire again from 1604 to 1611. He was a Deputy Lieutenant for Essex from 1605 until his death.

He died in 1615 aged 53 and was buried in his chapel at Knebworth church.

== Private life ==
He married Anne, the daughter of Sir Oliver St John, 1st Baron St John of Bletso, and widow of Robert Corbet of Moreton Corbet, Shropshire. They had three sons and four daughters. Anne (died 1612) married Sir William Webb and Judith married George Smith and then Sir Thomas Barrington, 2nd Baronet. His son William Lytton was also MP for Hertfordshire.

Preceded by Michael Hicks with Edward Darcy	MP for Truro; 1586–1587; With: John Stanhope, 1st Baron Stanhope	Succeeded by Hannibal Vyvyan; John Woolton
Preceded by Sir Robert Cecil; Sir Henry Cocke	MP for Hertfordshire; 1597–1598; With: Sir Robert Cecil	Succeeded by Sir Robert Cecil; Sir Henry Cary
Preceded by Sir Robert Cecil; Sir Henry Cary	MP for Hertfordshire; 1604; With: Sir Henry Cary	Succeeded by Sir Henry Cary; Ralph Coningsby
