= Richard Whalley =

Richard Whalley may refer to:

- Richard Whalley (died 1583) (1498/99–1583), MP for East Grinstead, Scarborough and Nottinghamshire
- Richard Whalley (died c. 1632) (c. 1558–c. 1632), MP for Nottinghamshire and Boroughbridge

== See also ==
- Richard Walley (born 1953), Aboriginal performer
