= The Tragedy of Mariam =

English closet tragedy (1613)

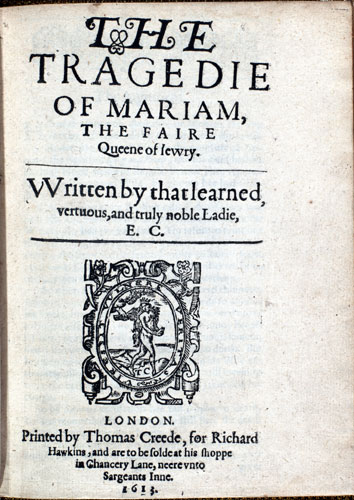
- Title page of Elizabeth Cary's The Tragedy of Mariam.
- Author: Elizabeth Cary
- Language: English
- Genre: Tragedy
- Set in: Judea, 29 B.C.
- Publisher: printed by Thomas Creede for Richard Hawkins
- Publication date: 1613
- Publication place: England

The Tragedy of Mariam, the Fair Queen of Jewry is a Jacobean-era drama written by Elizabeth Cary, Viscountess Falkland, and first published in 1613. There is some speculation that Cary may have written a play before The Tragedy of Mariam that has since been lost, but most scholars agree that The Tragedy of Mariam is the first extant original play written by a woman in English. It is also the first known English play to closely explore the history of King Herod's marriage to Mariamne.

The play was written between 1602 and 1604. It was entered into the Stationers' Register in December 1612. The 1613 quarto was printed by Thomas Creede for the bookseller Richard Hawkins. Cary's drama belongs to the subgenre of the Senecan revenge tragedy, which is made apparent by the presence of the classical style chorus that comments on the plot of the play, the lack of violence onstage, and "long, sententious speeches". The primary sources for the play are The Wars of the Jews and The Antiquities of the Jews by Josephus, which Cary used in Thomas Lodge's 1602 translation.

== Front Matter ==
The printed edition of Cary's play includes a dedication to Elizabeth Cary. It is unknown whether this refers to the sister of Cary's husband, Henry Cary, or the wife of his brother Philip Cary.

The play is then preceded by an invocation to the goddess Diana:

When cheerful Phoebus his full course hath run,
His sister's fainter beams our hearts doth cheer:
So your fair brother is to me the sun,
And you his sister as my moon appear.

You are my next belov'd, my second friend,
For when my Phoebus' absence makes it night,
Whilst to th'antipodes his beams do bend,
From you, my Phoebe, shines my second light.

He like to Sol, clear-sighted, constant, free,
You Luna-like, unspotted, chaste, divine:
He shone on Sicily, you destin'd be
T'illumine the now-obscurèd Palestine.
My first was consecrated to Apollo,
My second to Diana now shall follow.

Scholars have suggested that the last two lines of the invocation, "My first was consecrated to Apollo; / My second to Diana now shall follow" support the argument that Cary may have written a play previous to The Tragedy of Mariam.

== Characters ==
- Mariam (Mariamne I) – Queen of Judaea and Herod's second wife
- Herod the Great – King of Judaea
- Salome – Herod's sister
- Pheroras – Herod's brother
- Alexandra – Mariam's mother
- Silleus – Prince of Arabia and Salome's lover
- Constabarus – Salome's husband
- Graphina – Pheroras' lover
- Doris – Herod's first wife and Antipater's mother
- Antipater – Herod and Doris' son
- Ananell – High Priest
- Sohemus – Herod's counselor
- Nuntio – Messenger
- Babas' First Son – Hidden from Herod by Constabarus
- Babas' Second Son – Hidden from Herod by Constabarus
- Chorus – A company of Jews
- Butler to Herod

== Synopsis ==
The Tragedy of Mariam tells the story of Mariam, the second wife of Herod the Great, King of Judea from 39 to 4 B.C. The play opens in 29 B.C., when Herod is thought dead at the hand of Octavian (later Emperor Augustus).

Act I

- Scene I. Mariam enters, soliloquizing on the probable death of her husband Herod, who has gone to Rome to appear before Octavian. She reveals that her feelings towards her husband are conflicted because, while Herod loved her, he had also murdered her grandfather Hyrcanus and her brother Aristobulus to ensure his succession to the throne.
- Scene II. Mariam's mother Alexandra enters and scolds her daughter for shedding tears for Herod.
- Scene III. Salome, Herod's sister, engages in a verbal sparring match with Mariam and her mother concerning Mariam's faithfulness, class status, and fitness to be Herod's wife.
- Scene IV. After Mariam and Alexandra exit, Salome explains her plot to divorce her husband Constabarus in favor of her lover, the Arabian prince Silleus.
- Scene V. Silleus enters and Salome and he profess their love; Salome remarks that it is Constabarus who stands in the way of their happiness. Salome sees her husband coming and sends Silleus away.
- Scene VI. Constabarus enters and confronts Salome for her unfaithfulness and wavering disposition. Salome declares that she will seek a divorce from her husband, an option only available to men at the time.
- Chorus. The Chorus concludes the act by singing about the dangers of women wishing for variety or change in their lives.

Act II

- Scene I. Pheroras, brother of Salome and Herod, enters talking about his love of Graphina, a servant girl in Herod's court. Pheroras had been commanded to marry Herod's infant daughter, to keep the lines of succession pure, so he is conflicted about the news of Herod's death because, while he feels grief for his brother, Herod's death means that he can marry Graphina.
- Scene II. Constabarus enters with Babas' sons. Babas' sons had been sentenced to death by Herod twelve years prior to the start of the play, and Constabarus had been sheltering them in secret. Babas' sons are skeptical as to whether Herod is really dead, and they convince Constabarus to allow them to remain in hiding until Herod's death is confirmed, lest they be discovered or Salome uses the information against them.
- Scene III. Doris, Herod's first wife, enters with her son Antipater. They express their frustration at having been ousted from the court.
- Scene IV. Silleus challenges Constabarus to a duel. Silleus is wounded, but not fatally. Constabarus feels pity for Silleus and takes him away to take care of him. He exclaims, "I hate thy body, but I love thy mind,” and so expresses his appreciation for the Arabian Prince's intelligence and character.
- Chorus. The Chorus warns that people should have been more skeptical when they heard of Herod's death. They also state that people will often believe what they wish were true.

Act III

- Scene I. Pheroras and Salome argue over his decision to marry Graphina, whom Salome considers to be unworthy of her brother.
- Scene II. Ananell informs them that Herod is actually alive. Salome is pleased to hear the news because it means that she will be able to get rid of Mariam, but Pheroras is unhappy because he has gone against Herod's wishes and married Graphina, which will probably result in punishment. Salome engages Pheroras to speak to Herod about her divorce, and, in exchange, she will entreat Herod to be merciful towards Pheroras and his new bride. Salome explains her plan to turn Herod against Mariam by convincing him that Mariam is trying to poison him.
- Scene III. Mariam and Sohemus, Herod's counselor, enter. Sohemus tells Mariam that Herod is alive, and she laments Herod's return.
- Chorus. The Chorus comments that a wife should exhibit self-restraint by being chaste and keeping her body and her mind solely for her husband's enjoyment.

Act IV

- Scene I. Herod returns to the city and happily anticipates Mariam's welcome.
- Scene II. Pheroras enters and Herod expresses his unhappiness that he married Graphina. Pheroras then tells Herod that Salome divorced Constabarus because he had been harboring Babas' sons. Herod orders their execution while continuing to ask after Mariam.
- Scene III. Mariam enters and her gloomy countenance angers Herod. She refuses to dissemble, and she brings up Herod's violence against her grandfather and brother.
- Scene IV. The Butler enters with a drink for Herod, admitting that it is poison and claiming that Mariam gave it to him via Sohemus. Herod calls the royal guard to take Mariam away but then changes his mind. He wavers about having her executed.
- Scene V. The Butler expresses his guilt at framing Sohemus and Mariam; he reveals that Salome is the one responsible for this ruse.
- Scene VI. Constabarus enters with Babas' Sons, guarded. As they are being taken to the execution block, they lament the duplicity of evil women, i.e. Salome.
- Scene VII. Herod is torn about executing Mariam. Salome insinuates that Mariam and Sohemus were having an affair. Herod curses his sister for making him unsure of Mariam's innocence, and he orders Mariam's execution.
- Scene VIII. Mariam is confronted by Doris. Doris curses Mariam and her offspring to misery.
- Chorus. The Chorus lectures that it is better to forgive those who have wronged us than to seek revenge, but that if we must get revenge, it should be of the noblest kind. They criticize Mariam for not forgiving Herod for his actions against her family, as that would have saved her life.

Act V

- Scene I. Nuntio informs Herod that Mariam is dead. Herod expresses extreme regret and begins a lengthy soliloquy wherein he expresses how devastated he is by Mariam's death and his decision to have her beheaded.
- Chorus. The Chorus criticizes Herod for acting without thinking before ordering Mariam's death because he can never return life to her, then concludes, "This day alone our sagest Hebrews shall / In aftertimes the school of wisdom call".

== Recent performance history ==
The Tragedy of Mariam was directed by Stephanie Wright for Tinderbox Theatre Company at the Bradford Alhambra Studio, 19–22 October 1994.

The Tragedy of Mariam, Fair Queen of Jewry was directed by Liz Schafer at the Studio Theatre, Royal Holloway and Bedford New College, October 1995 (two performances).

Mariam was directed by Becs McCutcheon for Primavera at the King's Head Theatre, Islington, 22 July 2007.

The Tragedy of Mariam, Faire Queene of Jewry was directed by John East, 28 June 2012, Central School of Speech and Drama, London.

On 14 March 2013, The Tragedy of Mariam was produced by the Improbable Fictions staged reading series in Tuscaloosa, Alabama. It was directed by Kirstin Bone, produced by Nicholas Helms, and starred Miranda Nobert, Glen Johnson, Deborah Parker, Steve Burch, Michael Witherell, and Lauren Liebe.

The Mariam Project – Youth and Young Girlhood was directed by Becs McCutcheon for Burford Festival 2013, 12 June 2013 at St John the Baptist Church, Burford, Oxfordshire. The designer was Talulah Mason.

Lazarus Theatre Company performed The Tragedy of Mariam at the Tristan Bates Theatre in London's Covent Garden, in a version by director Gavin Harrington-Odedra, 12–17 August 2013.

The Mariam Pop Up installation was at the Gretchen Day Gallery, Peckham South London, 13 August 2013, directed by Rebecca McCutcheon and designed by Talulah Mason.

The Tragedy of Mariam, a cut-down version of the play, was performed on Shakespeare's Globe stage on 7 December 2013, directed by Rebecca McCutcheon.

The Tragedy of Mariam, a full cast audio adaptation of the play, was released on the Beyond Shakespeare podcast on 13 January 2023, produced by Robert Crighton.

Looking for Mariam, 1613, a documentary that includes stories of the play's history and filmed performances of select scenes, was directed by Ohio State University professor Elizabeth Kolkovich and co-written with undergraduate students. It premiered on YouTube on 28 April 2024.

== Critical reception ==
The story of Herod and Mariam would have been obscure to most English audiences, which makes Cary's choice of inspiration a point of interest for many scholars. The play received only marginal attention until the 1970s, when feminist scholars recognized the play's contribution to English literature. Since then the play has received much more scholarly attention.

While some continue to argue that The Tragedy of Mariam was not written to be performed, and that because it was not intended for the stage, much of the action in the play is described through dialogue rather than shown, others, such as Alison Findlay, have argued the play could have been staged at a great house associated with Cary's family such as Burford Priory, Ditchley, or Berkhamstead. Indeed, Stephanie Wright, who has directed the play, argues that action is often important in the play, in particular

The presentation of the 'poison' cup to Herod, the sword fight between Constabarus and Silleus, and the physical vacillation of Herod’s soldiers, with Mariam as their prisoner, as they respond to Herod’s constantly changing orders, are actions which need physical representation.

Elizabeth Schafer points out that the opening of 4.1., Herod's first entrance, has the stage direction 'Enter Herod and his attendants' and that given that the attendants subsequently say nothing, this stage direction is primarily visual or physical, that is, evidence of a theatrical rather than a readerly imagination.

Critics who believe that Mariam is a closet drama argue that this form allowed women to exercise a form of agency without disrupting the patriarchal social order, and that they were able to "use closet activity to participate directly in the theater" since they were forbidden from participating in stage theatre. The close links between closet drama's and conduct literature were able to disguise potentially more transgressive ideas, such as the proto-feminist ideas of female liberation proposed by the play's antagonist, Salome.

=== Themes ===
Critics often address the theme of marriage in Cary's play, such as how Mariam's tumultuous marriage may have been written as a response by Cary to her own relationship with her husband. Mariam is caught between her duty as a wife and her own personal feelings, much as Cary might have been, as a Catholic-leaning woman married to a Protestant husband.

The theme of female agency and divorce is another common topic for critics. For example, some critics focus on Salome, who divorces her husband of her own will in order to be with her lover, Silleus. Though Mariam is the title character and the play's moral center, her part in the play amounts to only about 10% of the whole.

Tyranny is another key theme. Cary uses a Chorus and a set of secondary characters to provide a multi-vocal portrayal of Herod's court and Jewish society under his tyranny.

== See also ==
- Women's writing
- Feminist literary criticism
- List of early-modern British women playwrights
