= Sir John Barrington, 3rd Baronet =

17th-century English politician

Sir John Barrington, 3rd Baronet (1605 – 24 March 1683) of Barrington Hall, Essex was an English lawyer and politician who sat in the House of Commons at various times between 1645 and 1679.

== Life ==
Barrington was the eldest son of Sir Thomas Barrington, 2nd Baronet and his first wife Frances Gobert, daughter of John Gobert. He was educated at Trinity College, Cambridge. In 1635, after being called to the bar from Gray's Inn, Barrington was knighted at Whitehall, and in 1644, he succeeded his father as baronet. His father died heavily in debt, and as a result the son later spent some time in the Fleet Prison. Barrington sent a petition to parliament alleging that his stepmother Judith Barrington was removing timber from the family estate to sell and that this damaged its value. There were a large number of legal disputes although Judith's biographer, Caroline M. K. Bowden, believes that his stepmother had the expertise and that she was in the right.

Barrington was nominated to be one of the High Court Judges in the trial of King Charles I of England in 1649, Barrington, although he was a family connection of Oliver Cromwell. He refused to attend its meetings and declined to sign the warrant for the king's execution. From 1645 to 1648 and again from 1660 to 1679, he was a Member of Parliament (MP) for Newtown. He was a rather inactive member, due partly to his increasingly ill health. In 1654 he was High Sheriff of Essex and also High Sheriff of Hertfordshire.

Barrington was married to Dorothy Lytton, daughter of Sir William Lytton. They had five sons and nine daughters. Barrington was buried at Hatfield Broadoak, a week after his death. His eldest son had died in his lifetime, and thus the baronetcy passed in turn to his grandsons John and Charles.

Parliament of England
Preceded by Nicholas Weston; Sir John Meux, 1st Baronet	Member of Parliament for Newtown; 1645–1648; With: John Bulkeley	Succeeded by Not represented in Rump Parliament
Preceded by Not represented in restored Rump	Member of Parliament for Newtown; 1660–1679; With: Sir Henry Worsley 1660–1666; Sir Robert Worsley 1666–1677; Sir John Holmes 1677–1679	Succeeded by Sir John Holmes; John Churchill
Baronetage of England
Preceded by Thomas Barrington	Baronet (of Barrington Hall); 1644–1683	Succeeded by John Barrington
