= Robert Barrington =

- Died: 1642
- Occupation: member of parliament
- Years active: 1628–1629

Robert Barrington (died 1642) was the member of parliament for Newton on the Isle of Wight, England, from 1628 until 1629.

== Life ==
Barrington was the second son of Joan and Francis Barrington and lived in Hatfield. He was a cousin of Oliver Cromwell. His brother Thomas succeeded to the baronetcy and also was an MP for Newton. His son, also Francis Barrington, joined the New Model Army and joined the forces of Robert Venables in the Western Design serving as Lt.-Colonel in the regiment of Anthony Buller.
