= Sir Thomas Barrington, 2nd Baronet =

17th-century English Puritan activist and politician

Sir Thomas Barrington JP
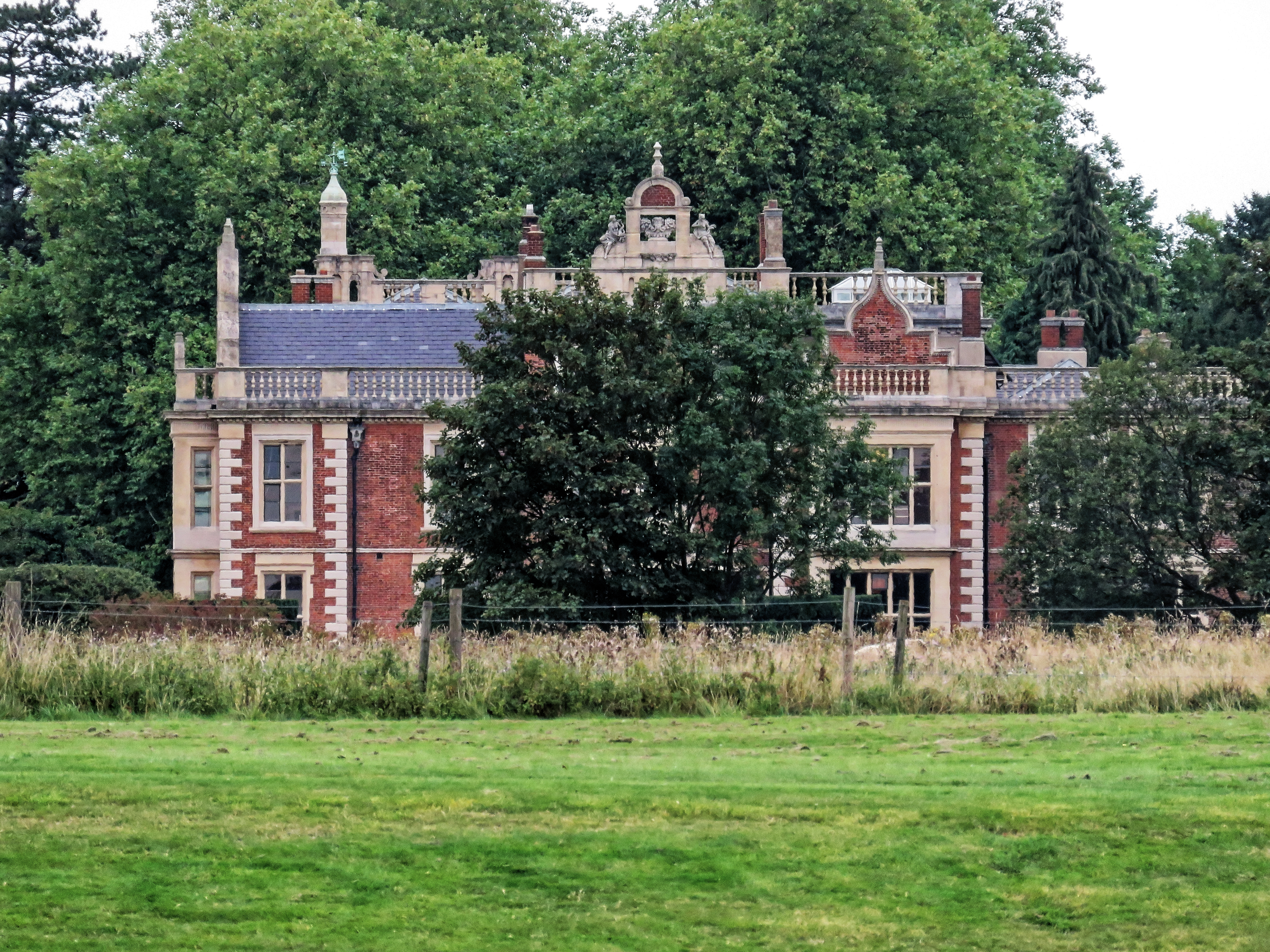
- Barrington Hall, Hatfield Broad Oak, Essex

Member of Parliament for Colchester
- In office November 1640 – September 1644

Member of Parliament for Essex
- In office April 1640 – April 1640

Deputy Lord Lieutenant of Essex
- In office 1629–1643

Member of Parliament for Newtown
- In office January 1621 – March 1629

Personal details
- Born: 1585 Barrington Hall, Essex
- Died: 18 September 1644 (aged 59) London
- Resting place: St Mary the Virgin, Hatfield Broad Oak
- Spouse(s): Frances Gobert (1611-1623); Judith Smith (born Lytton), (1624-his death)
- Education: Trinity College, Cambridge
- Occupation: Landowner, politician and Puritan activist

Sir Thomas Barrington, 2nd Baronet, 1585 to 18 September 1644, was an English politician and Puritan activist who sat in the House of Commons at various times between 1621 and 1644. In the early stages of the First English Civil War, he helped establish the Eastern Association, one of the most effective elements of the Parliamentarian army.

== Family ==
Thomas Barrington was born in 1585, eldest son of Sir Francis Barrington of Hatfield Broad Oak, Essex (1560-1628) and Joan Cromwell (c.1568-1641), aunt to the future Parliamentarian leaders Oliver Cromwell and John Hampden. One of nine surviving children, he had three brothers; Robert (?-1642), Francis (?-before 1628) and John (?-1631), who died in the Netherlands during the Eighty Years War.

Of his five sisters, Elizabeth was married to Sir William Masham, and Mary to Sir Gilbert Gerard, Winifred to Sir William Meux. All three of his brothers-in-law were MPs, as were his father and brother Thomas, making the Barrington family part of a network of Puritan activists.

In 1611, he married Frances Gobert (died 1623); they had three surviving children, Lucy, John (1615-1683) and Gobert (before 1623-c.1695). He married again in 1624, this time to what he considered a good match with Judith Smith (born Lytton). They had no children but it was a happy marriage.

His new wife continued to manage her estate from her first marriage and she also took on the management of her second husband's estates even after he inherited further interests in Lincolnshire and the Isle of Wight in 1628. She had a steward but he followed her instructions as she considered herself "the manager of all things". Some say she was bossy. She mitigated the effects of rent on tenants who had financial problems and she demonstrated a good knowledge of trees and especially fruit trees.

The Long Parliament began in 1620 and her husband as a member would spend long periods in London. She corresponded with him keeping him abreast of local events and advising him on who might be a good assistant. He died in 1644 and his widow had several disputes with his son, John, long after his death.

== Career ==
Barrington attended Trinity College, Cambridge in 1601. As legal training was then considered an essential part of education, he studied law at Gray's Inn in 1602. He was knighted in about 1621, and the same year was elected Member of Parliament (MP) for Newtown. He was re-elected for the constituency in 1624, 1625, 1626 and 1628 and sat until 1629 when King Charles decided to rule without parliament for eleven years. In 1628, he succeeded to the baronetcy on the death of his father. Barrington has been identified as part of the so-called "Middle Group" within Parliament, led by Pym until his death in December 1643, then by Oliver St John. Unlike the "War" or "Peace" factions, these MPs did not vote consistently, but they were prominent in persuading Parliament to approve the Solemn League and Covenant, an alliance with the Scots Covenanters.

== Sources ==
- Bowden, Caroline (2004). "Barrington [née Lytton], Judith, Lady Barrington". Oxford Dictionary of National Biography (online ed.). Oxford University Press. doi:10.1093/ref:odnb/46469. (Subscription, Wikipedia Library access or UK public library membership required.)
- Collins, Arthur (1741). The English Baronetage: Containing a Genealogical and Historical Account of All the English Baronets, Volume I. Thomas Wotton.
- Courthope, William (1835). Synopsis of the Extinct Baronetage of England. G. Woodfall.
- Kyle, David (2009). "Barrington, Sir Thomas, second baronet (c. 1585–1644)". Oxford Dictionary of National Biography (online ed.). Oxford University Press. doi:10.1093/ref:odnb/70626. (Subscription, Wikipedia Library access or UK public library membership required.)
- Moseley, Virginia; Sgroi, Rosemary (2010). BARRINGTON, Sir Thomas (c.1585-1644), of Barrington Hall, Hatfield Broad Oak, Essex in The History of Parliament: the House of Commons 1604-1629. CUP.
- Palmer, William (1982). "Oliver St. John and the Middle Group in the Long Parliament, 1643-1645: A Reappraisal". Albion: A Quarterly Journal Concerned with British Studies. 14 (1): 20–26. doi:10.2307/4048483. JSTOR 4048483.
- Seale, Arthur (1983). Barrington family letters, 1628-1632. Royal Historical Society.

Parliament of England
Preceded by William Higford; Sir Henry Berkeley	Member of Parliament for Newtown; 1621–1629; With: Sir William Harington 1621–1622; George Garrard 1624–1625; Thomas Malet 1625–1626; Robert Barrington 1628–1629	Parliament suspended until 1640
Parliament suspended since 1629	Member of Parliament for Essex; 1640; With: Sir Harbottle Grimston	Succeeded by Lord Rich; Sir William Masham
Preceded by Sir Harbottle Grimston; Sir William Masham, Bt	Member of Parliament for Colchester; 1640–1644; With: Sir Harbottle Grimston	Succeeded by Sir Harbottle Grimston; John Sayer
Baronetage of England
Preceded by Francis Barrington	Baronet (of Barrington Hall); 1628–1644	Succeeded by John Barrington
