= William Lytton =

English politician

Sir William Lytton DL JP

Member of Parliament for Hertfordshire
- In office 1640–1648 Serving with Arthur Capel, Sir Thomas Dacres
- Preceded by: Parliament suspended since 1629
- Succeeded by: Not represented in the Rump Parliament
- In office 1628–1629 Serving with Sir Thomas Dacres
- Preceded by: Sir John Boteler; Sir Thomas Dacres
- Succeeded by: Parliament suspended until 1640

Personal details
- Born: 29 September 1586 Knebworth, Hertfordshire
- Died: 14 August 1660 (aged 73) Knebworth, Hertfordshire
- Spouse(s): Roland Lytton; Anne St John Corbert
- Relations: Sir William Gostwick, 4th Baronet (grandson)
- Children: 8
- Parent(s): Anne Slaney (m. 1612; died 1626) Ruth Barrington (m. 1644; died 1645)
- Education: Westminster school
- Alma mater: Emmanuel College, Cambridge

Sir William Lytton DL JP (29 September 1586 – 14 August 1660) was an English politician who sat in the House of Commons from 1640 to 1648. He supported the Parliamentary cause in the English Civil War.

== Early life ==
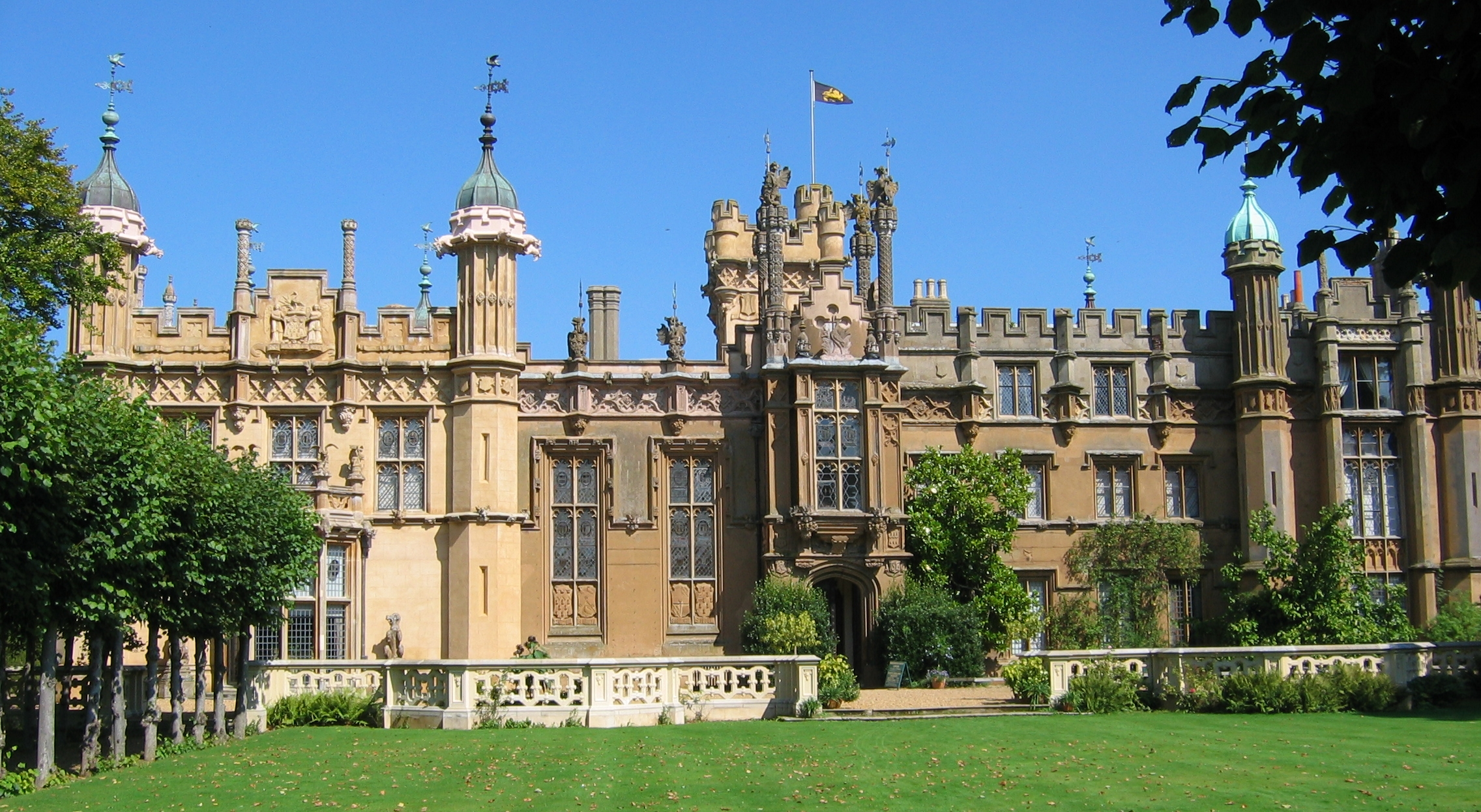
Knebworth House, the Lytton family seat

Lytton was born on 29 September 1586. He was the eldest son of Sir Rowland Lytton of Knebworth, and Anne (née St John) Corbert. Before his parents' marriage, his mother was the widow of Robert Corbet, MP for Shropshire.

His paternal grandparents were Rowland Lytton, Governor of the Castle of Boulogne, and the former Anne Carleton (a daughter of George Carleton and sister to George Carleton). His maternal grandfather was Oliver St John, 1st Baron St John of Bletso and, his first wife, Agnes Fisher. After his grandmother's death, his grandfather married Elizabeth Chamber, a lady-in-waiting to each of King Henry VIII's six wives.

He was educated at Westminster school from 1601 to 1602, and Emmanuel College, Cambridge from 1603 to 1607 before travelling abroad to France, Italy and the low countries from 1608 to 1609 with William Borlase and William Cecil.

== Career ==
He succeeded his father in 1615, inheriting the Knebworth estate. He was knighted on 25 July 1624 and appointed High Sheriff of Hertfordshire in 1625 serving until 1626. He was Deputy Lieutenant of the county from 1625 to 1630.

In 1628, Lytton was elected Member of Parliament for Hertfordshire. In April 1640, he was re-elected MP for Herefordshire in the Short Parliament and then in November 1640 for the Long Parliament. Lytton supported the Parliamentary cause in the Civil War and was one of the commissioners sent by Parliament and received by King Charles who tried to negotiate peace at Oxford in 1643, (They failed to reach terms and the war was to continue for three more years). Lytton was excluded from parliament under Pride's Purge in 1648.

== Personal life ==
On 24 February 1612, Lytton married firstly Anne Slaney, the only child of Stephen Slaney of Norton, Shropshire (son of Sir Stephen Slaney). Before her death in 1626, they were the parents of one son and seven daughters, including:

- Margaret Lytton (1613–1689), who married Thomas Hillersdon, of Elstow. After his death, she married Sir Thomas Hewett, 1st Baronet, of Pishiobury, in c. 1633.
- Rowland Lytton (c. 1615–1674), MP for Hertfordshire; he married Judith Edwards, daughter of Humphrey Edwards. After her death, he married Rebecca (née Chapman) Lucy, daughter of Thomas Chapman and widow of Sir Richard Lucy
- Mary Lytton (b. 1622), who married Sir Henry Anderson, 1st Baronet of Penley. After his death, she married Sir Edward Gostwick, 3rd Baronet in 1646.
- Dorothy Lytton (d. 1703), who married her cousin Sir John Barrington, 3rd Baronet, MP for Newtown.
- Jane Lytton, who married Sir Thomas Bosville.

Around November 1644 He married secondly Ruth (née Barrington) Lamplugh (d. 1645), daughter of Sir Francis Barrington, 1st Baronet of Barrington Hall, Essex and widow of Sir George Lamplugh of Kirby Sigston.

On his death he was buried at Knebworth and succeeded by his son Rowland. A monument was not erected until 1705, this being to the design of Edward Stanton.

Parliament of England
Preceded by Sir John Boteler; Sir Thomas Dacres	Member of Parliament for Hertfordshire; 1628–1629; With: Sir Thomas Dacres	Parliament suspended until 1640
Parliament suspended since 1629	Member of Parliament for Hertfordshire; 1640–1648; With: Arthur Capel 1640–1641; Sir Thomas Dacres 1641–1648	Not represented in Rump Parliament
