= Judith Barrington =

Judith Barrington may refer to:

- Judith Barrington (gentlewoman) (1500s–1657), British gentlewoman
- Judith Barrington (poet) (born 1944), American poet
