= Anne Cary =

British Benedictine nun

- Born: 1614
- Died: 1671 (aged 56–57)
- Parents: Henry Cary (father); Elizabeth Cary (mother)
- Relatives: Lucius Cary (brother); Patrick Cary (brother); Lucy Cary (sister)

Anne Cary (baptised 14 October 1614 – 1671) was a British Benedictine nun who founded 'Our Lady of Good Hope Convent' in Paris.

== Life ==
Cary was the daughter of Elizabeth Cary and Henry Cary who was the first Viscount Falkland. He worked as the master of the jewel house and then comptroller of the royal household. Cary's mother became a Catholic and many of her children were religious. Anne was baptised at Berkhamsted in 1614 and was brought up in Aldenham and London. She moved with her family to Dublin when her father was promoted to lord deputy of Ireland in 1622.

Cary returned to England in 1625 and spent some years in either England or Ireland. She entered the court where she began a lifelong friendship with the Queen Henrietta Maria.

Cary's mother had become a Catholic in November 1626. Her father, who did not live with her mother, died in 1633, and her mother sought to regain custody of her children. She was questioned in the Star Chamber for kidnapping her sons (she had previously, and more easily, gained custody of her daughters), but there is no record of any punishment. In 1634, Abbe, Elizabeth, Mary and Lucy were converted to the Catholic faith by Father John Fursdon who was their mother's confessor. Edward Barrett, Lord Barrett reported this to King Charles I and he agreed that the four girls should be removed from their mother's house and taken to Great Tew, an estate inherited by their brother Lucius Cary, 2nd Viscount Falkland. Her mother arranged for six of her children to be moved to Cambrai. Henry, Lucy, Mary, Elizabeth and Anne became Brother Placid, and sisters Magdelena, Mary, Augustina and Clementia joined the 'Our Lady of Consolation' convent. Another brother Patrick stayed for only two years before he quit the religious life.

Cary joined the Benedictines in Cambrai as a choir nun in 1639. Her father while in Ireland had persecuted the Catholics whereas his wife and several of his children now embraced the faith. Her father left Ireland in 1629 and returned to England but he and Cary's mother lived apart. He died in 1633.

In 1651, the convent in Cambrai was becoming crowded and uneconomic. Anne, her sister Mary, and one other were sent to Paris to found another convent. Anne was able to contact Queen Henrietta Maria, and she arranged for the three women to receive a pension that continued until the Queen's death in 1669. With the assistance of others, Anne established the convent but she refused the position of abbess. Anne died in Paris at Our Lady of Good Hope Convent on 26 April 1671.

== Works ==
- eight Collection Books
- Spiritual songs...in three parts
- Psalms (translation)

In addition she had the "Second Booke of Dialogues" dedicated to her in 1638.
