= Triolet =

Forme fixe

A triolet (UK: /ˈtraɪəlɪt/, US: /ˌtriːəˈleɪ/) is almost always a stanza poem of eight lines, although stanzas with as few as seven lines and as many as nine or more have appeared in its history. Its rhyme scheme is $\mathrm{ABaAabAB}$ (capital letters represent lines repeated verbatim). Often in 19th century English triolets, all lines are in iambic tetrameter. In traditional French triolets, from the 17th century onward, the meter is usually octosyllabic (8 syllables per line), with one rhyme masculine and one feminine. Depending on the language and era, other meters are seen. The first, fourth, and seventh lines are identical, as are the second and final lines, thereby making the initial and final couplets identical as well. In a traditional French triolet, the second and third non-repeating lines rhyme with the repeating first, fourth, and seventh lines, while the non-repeating sixth line rhymes with the second and eighth repeating lines. However, especially in German triolets of the 18th and 19th centuries, this pattern is often violated.

== History ==
The triolet is a close cousin of the rondeau, the rondel, and the rondelet, other French verse forms emphasizing repetition and rhyme. The form stems from medieval French poetry and seems to have had its origin in Picardy.

The earliest written examples are from the late 13th century. In this century, possibly the earliest surviving triolet is from "Li Roumans dou Chastelain de Couci et de la Dame de Fayel", where it is referred to as simply a song ("chanson"). Seven more easily datable 13th century triolets (also known as songs) are to be found in "Cléomadès" by Adenet le Roi. In the early 14th century, the songwriter, Jean Lescurel, wrote many triolets under the term of rondel. Lescurel was followed by Guillaume de Machaut and, at the end of the century, by Jean Froissart. In the early 15th century, Christine de Pisan experimented with a slightly abbreviated seven-line variation of the triolet which she, like her predecessors, also termed a rondel. Toward the end of this century, Dutch language triolets (though designated as rondels) by Anthonis de Roovere appear. Also, at the end of the 15th century, the term triolet appears for the first time. It was probably first so designated by Octavien de Saint-Gelais, whose colleague André de la Vigne appears to have designated his own triolets as rondelets. In the 16th century, variously designated French and Dutch triolets continue to appear, though they largely lose favor by the end of the century. In the 17th century from 1648 to 1652, triolets designated as triolets became suddenly popular in France during the civil uprisings of the "Fronde" when triolets were used for propaganda purposes and for character assassination. However, what remains easily accessible from this period are, basically, two poems, one by Marc-Antoine Girard, Sieur de Saint-Amant and another by Jacques de Ranchin. Saint-Amant's poem is a triolet about writing a triolet and Ranchin's, also known as the "king of triolets", is about falling in love on the first of May. Though the triolet did not recover its former popularity in 18th century France, it did, with the appearance of Théodore de Banville in the mid-19th century, experience a revival of interest with triolets being written by Arthur Rimbaud, Maurice Rollinat, Alphonse Daudet, and Stéphane Mallarmé.

The earliest known triolets composed in English were written in 1651 by Patrick Cary, briefly a Benedictine at Douai, who purportedly used them in his devotions. None of Cary's poetry was published until the late 18th century and his triolets did not achieve notice until Sir Walter Scott published them in 1820. Probably, the two earliest publications of a triolet in English were both translations of Ranchin's king of triolets, with one being published in 1728 and the other in 1806. In 1835 a rondel of Froissart was translated into English as a triolet. In 1870 Robert Bridges became the first English poet to write original triolets in English that were published and achieved recognition in England. This, though, was less through his own efforts than through the impact of an influential article written by Edmund Gosse and printed in 1877 in the Cornhill Magazine reintroducing the triolet to the English public at large, among whom it enjoyed a brief popularity among late-nineteenth-century British poets.

Not only did the triolet come to enjoy popularity in the late 19th century among English writers, but in the 18th and 19th centuries, it also came to enjoy a certain popularity among writers of other European languages. Among the various languages in which the triolet appeared, German writers of triolets, in particular, were not only numerous, but, by and large, made a point of developing it in new directions not seen with English and French writers. In addition to German, the triolet also appeared in Dutch, Greek, Hungarian, Polish, Portuguese, Russian, Spanish, and possibly other languages during these two centuries. Moreover, in Brazil in the late 19th century, the triolet spawned a new, somewhat abbreviated, six-line verse form known as the biolet.

Though possessing a long history, triolets, with the exception of France in the years from 1648 to 1652, have always been a relatively rare verse form. Nevertheless, the number of languages in which triolets have been written and the number of poets who have written triolets has steadily increased and it seems to be exhibiting a new vitality with the advent of the 21st century.

== Examples ==
The following five triolets were written in 1651, 1806, 1870, 1877 and 1888, respectively, the first four being written by Englishmen and the last by an American.

1. Farewell all earthly joys and care

Worldly designs, fears, hopes, farewell!
Farewell all earthly joys and cares!
On nobler thoughts my soul shall dwell,
Worldly designs, fears, hopes, farewell!
At quiet, in my peacefull cell,
I'll think on God, free from your snares;
Worldly designs, fears, hopes, farewell!
Farewell all earthly joys and cares

— Patrick Cary

2. The first of May

The first morn in the month of May
I prize far more than all the rest;
For thee I saw and told that day,
The first morn of the month of May,
That thou my heart had'st stolen away.
If thee please what I then confessed,
The first morn in the month of May
I prize far more than all the rest.

— Robert Fellowes

3. When we first met

When first we met we did not guess
That Love would prove so hard a master;
Of more than common friendliness
When first we met we did not guess
Who could foretell this sore distress,
This irretrievable disaster
When first we met? We did not guess
That Love would prove so hard a master.

— Robert Bridges

4. Love's but a dance

Oh, Love's but a dance,
Where Time plays the fiddle!
See the couples advance,—
Oh, Love's but a dance!
A whisper, a glance, —
Shall we twirl down the middle?
Oh, Love's but a dance,
Where Time plays the fiddle!

— Austin Dobson

Robert Fellows' piece "The first of May" derives its title from an English translation of the first line of an older triolet written by the French poet Ranchin in c. 1690. In reference to Ranchin's original French triolet, English poet and literary critic Edmund Gosse claimed that "No more typical specimen of the [early French] triolet could be found":

Le premier jour du mois de mai
Fut le plus heureux de ma vie:
Le beau dessein que je formais,
Le premier jour du mois de mai!
Je vous vis et je vous aimais.
Si ce dessein vous plut, Sylvie,
Le premier jour du mois de mai
Fut le plus heureux de ma vie.

== The modern English triolet ==
The following is an example of a modern English triolet.

"Birds At Winter"

Around the house the flakes fly faster,
And all the berries now are gone
From holly and cotoneaster
Around the house. The flakes fly! – faster
Shutting indoors the crumb-outcaster
We used to see upon the lawn
Around the house. The Flakes fly faster
And all the berries now are gone!

— Thomas Hardy

In the last line the punctuation is altered; this is common although not strictly in keeping with the original form. Furthermore, the fact that the "berries now are gone" has a new relevance -- the birds are going unfed -- creates a new significance from the line repetition.
