= Joan Barrington =

English matriarch and patron of clergy

Lady Barrington
- Born: c.1558
- Died: 1641
- Occupation: Matriarch
- Spouse: Sir Francis Barrington
- Children: nine survived
- Relatives: Oliver Cromwell and John Hampden (nephews)

Joan Barrington, Lady Barrington born Joan Cromwell aka Joan Williams (c.1558 – 1641) was an English matriarch and patron of clergy.

== Life ==
She was born in about 1558 and her parents were Joan and Sir Henry Williams (later Cromwell).

She was the aunt to the future Parliamentarian leaders Oliver Cromwell and John Hampden. and her sister Frances married the politician Richard Whalley.

She married Sir Francis Barrington and they lived at Barrington Hall until their eldest son married and then they moved to the Priory House at Hatfield Broad Oak.

They were active supporters of the Puritans and in their home in Hatfield they had a portrait of Theodore Beza. They used their wealth to support protestant clergy including Arthur Hildersham, Bishop Leonard Mawe, John Preston, Ezekiel Rogers, and Roger Williams.

They had nine surviving children, including four sons, Thomas (c.1585-1644), Robert (?-1642), Francis (?-before 1628) and John (?-1631), who died in the Netherlands during the Eighty Years War. Her son, Thomas's second wife was Judith Barrington who was also a notable supporter of puritan clergy and one of her correspondents. Of Joan's five daughters, Elizabeth was married to Sir William Masham, and Mary to Sir Gilbert Gerard, Winifred to Sir William Meux. All three of her sons-in-law and her two elder sons were MPs at one stage or another; these family connections put Barrington at the centre of a powerful political clique.

Lady Barrington died in 1641 and is thought to be buried with her family at Hatfield Regis Priory.

== Sources ==
- Collins, Arthur (1741). The English Baronetage: Containing a Genealogical and Historical Account of All the English Baronets, Volume I. Thomas Wotton.
- Courthope, William (1835). Synopsis of the Extinct Baronetage of England. G. Woodfall.
- Lowndes, G. Alan (1878). "The History of the Barrington Family". Transactions of the Essex Archaeological Society. 1.
- Seale, Arthur (1983). Barrington family letters, 1628-1632. Royal Historical Society.
