= John Boteler, 1st Baron Boteler of Brantfield =

English politician

John Boteler, 1st Baron Boteler of Brantfield, (c. 1566 – 27 May 1637) was an English politician who sat in the House of Commons from 1625 to 1626. The Butlers of Hertfordshire claimed descent from Ralph le Boteler, butler to Robert de Beaumont, Count of Meulan and Earl of Leicester in the time of Henry I, and by the 15th century they had been seated at Watton for some time.

== Biography ==
Boteler was the son and heir of Sir Henry Boteler of Hatfield Woodhall and of Brantfield, Hertfordshire, by his first wife, Catharine, daughter of Robert Waller, of Hadley, Middlesex. He was knighted at Greenwich in July 1607, and succeeded his father on 20 January 1609, aged 43. He was created baronet of Hatfield Woodhall on 12 April 1620. In 1625, he was elected Member of Parliament for Hertfordshire. He was re-elected M.P. for Hertfordshire in 1626. He was created Baron Boteler of Brantfield, co. Hertford, on 30 July 1628.

== Personal life ==
Boteler married, before 1609, Elizabeth Villiers, daughter of Sir George Villiers, of Brokesby, co. Leicester, half-sister to George Villiers, 1st Duke of Buckingham. They had two sons and six daughters,

- Audrey, who married Francis Leigh, 1st Earl of Chichester,
- Helen (died 2 October 1666), or Eleanor, who married on 18 May 1616, Sir John Drake, of Ash, Devon, a grandson of Sir Bernard Drake, and became the mother of Sir John Drake, 1st Baronet, and maternal grandmother of John Churchill, 1st Duke of Marlborough,
- Jane (died 1672), who married firstly James Ley, 1st Earl of Marlborough and secondly William Ashburnham,
- Anne, who married Mountjoy Blount, 1st Earl of Newport,
- Sir Henry Boteler, who was a favourite with his uncle, the Duke of Buckingham, but predeceased his father, having been sent with a tutor to Spain in 1617 "to cure him of the disease of drinking, which, young as he was, he was already much given to,"
- William Boteler, 2nd Baron Boteler of Brantfield, who was found "to have been an idiot from his birth" and died unmarried in 1647, when all his honours became extinct,

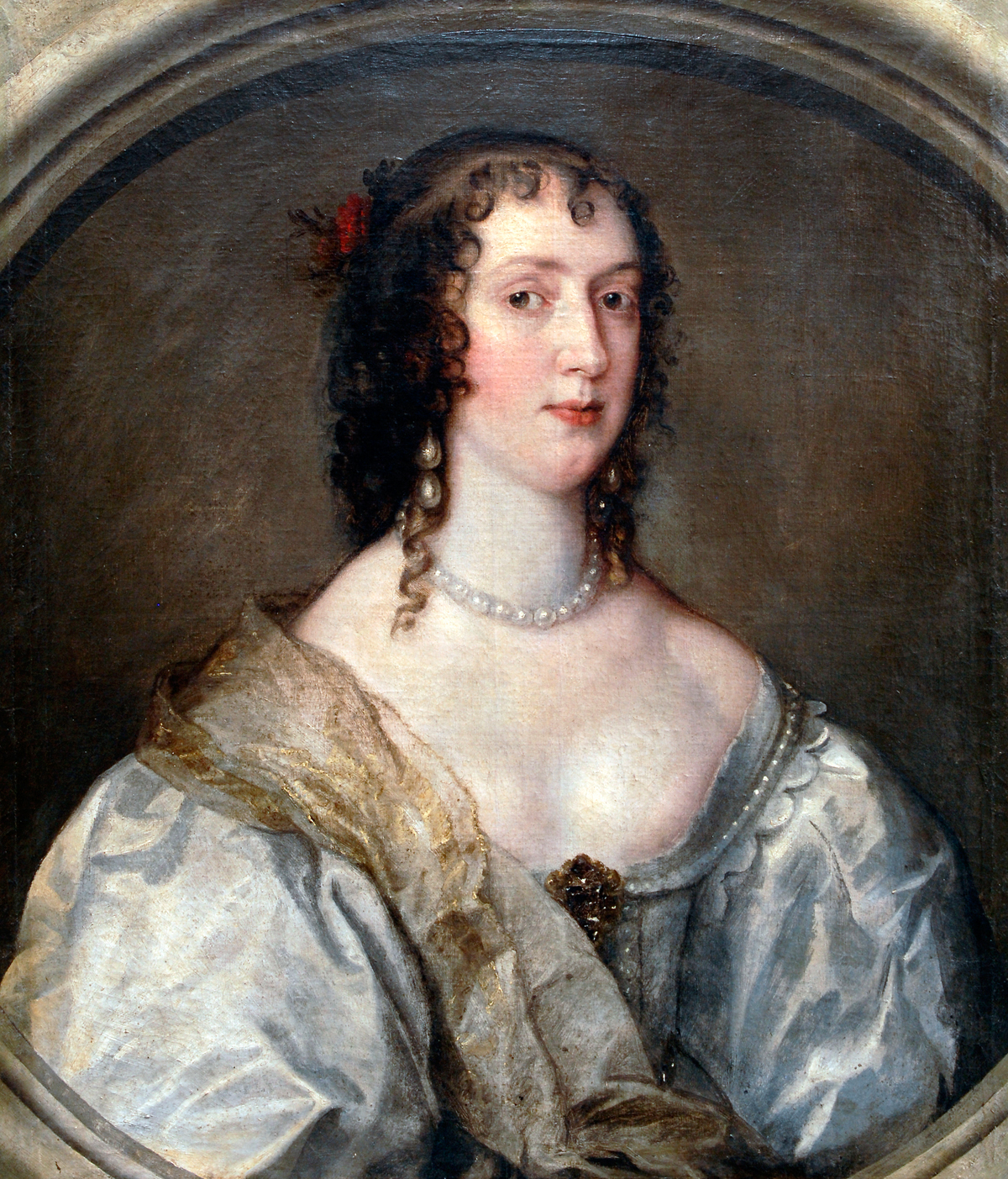
Boteler’s daughter Olivia,by van Dyck

- Olivia (died 13 December 1663), who was a lady-in-waiting to Queen Henrietta Maria, and who married Endymion Porter, Groom of the Bedchamber and patron of Antony Van Dyke,
- Mary, who married Edward Howard, 1st Baron Howard of Escrick, at York House on 30 November 1623.

== Death ==
Boteler died on 27 May 1637, at St. Martin's-in-the-Fields, aged about 71, and was buried at Higham Gobion, Bedfordshire. He was succeeded by his son, William.

Parliament of England
Preceded by Sir Charles Morrison, 1st Baronet; Sir William Lytton	Member of Parliament for Hertfordshire; 1625–1626; With: John Boteler 1625; Sir Thomas Dacres	Succeeded by Sir Thomas Dacres; Sir William Lytton
Peerage of England
New creation	Baron Boteler of Brantfield; 1628–1637	Succeeded by William Boteler
Baronetage of England
New creation	Baronet (of Hatfield Woodhall); 1620–1637	Succeeded by William Boteler
