= Thomas Dacres =

English politician

Sir Thomas Dacres (19 October 1587 – December 1668) was an English politician who sat in the House of Commons variously between 1626 and 1660. He supported the Parliamentary cause in the English Civil War.

Dacres was the son of Sir Thomas Dacres of Cheshunt, Hertfordshire and his wife Dorothy Piggott, daughter of Thomas Pigott of Dodershall, Buckinghamshire. He matriculated from St John's College, Cambridge at Easter 1603. He succeeded his father in 1615 and was appointed High Sheriff of Hertfordshire for Aug–Nov 1615 to complete his father's year of shrievalty and knighted on 22 February 1617.

In 1626, Dacres was elected Member of Parliament for Hertfordshire. He was re-elected MP for Hertfordshire in 1628 and sat until 1629 when King Charles decided to rule without parliament for eleven years. In 1641 he was re-elected MP for Hertfordshire in the Long Parliament and sat until 1648 when he was excluded under Pride's Purge. During the civil war he served on various parliamentary commissions.

In 1660, Dacres was elected Member of Parliament for Higham Ferrers in the Convention Parliament. His main interest in parliament was to recover a loan of £250 made in 1642 for suppression of the Irish rebellion. He never received the money and suffered losses in the Great Fire of London.

Dacres died at the age of 81 and was buried at Cheshunt on 26 December 1668.

Dacres married Martha Elmes, daughter of Thomas Elmes of Lilford Northamptonshire. His son Thomas was also an MP.

Parliament of England
Preceded by Sir John Boteler; John Boteler	Member of Parliament for Hertfordshire; 1626–1629; With: John Boteler 1626; Sir William Lytton 1628–1629	Parliament suspended until 1640
Preceded by Sir William Lytton; Arthur Capel	Member of Parliament for Hertfordshire; 1641–1648; With: Sir William Lytton	Not represented in Rump Parliament
