= Henry Cary, 1st Viscount Falkland =

English landowner and politician

The Right Honourable The Viscount Falkland
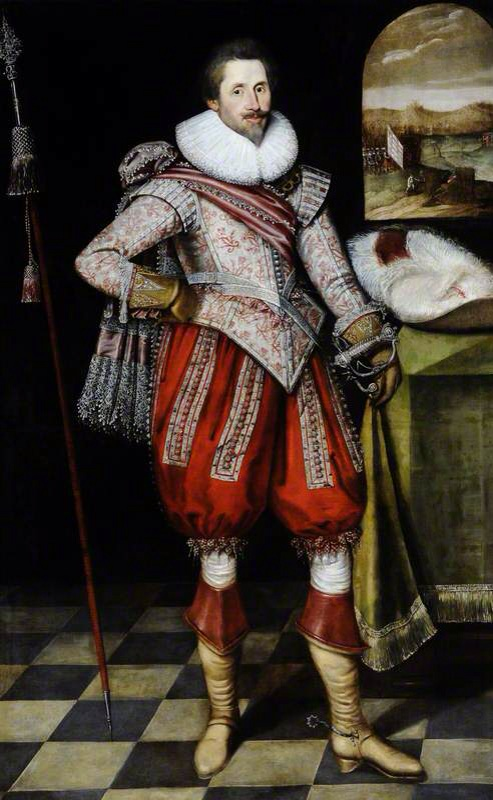
- Henry Carey, 1st Viscount Falkland, c. 1625

Member of the England Parliament for Hertfordshire
- In office 1601–1611 Serving with Sir Robert Cecil 1601–1604; Sir Roland Lytton 1604–1611
- Preceded by: Sir Robert Cecil; Sir Roland Lytton
- Succeeded by: Sir Henry Carey; Ralph Coningsby
- In office 1621–1622 Serving with Sir Charles Morrison
- Preceded by: Sir Henry Carey; Ralph Coningsby
- Succeeded by: Sir Charles Morrison; Sir William Lytton

Lord Deputy of Ireland
- In office 18 September 1622 – 10 August 1629
- Appointed by: George Villiers, Duke of Buckingham
- Preceded by: Sir Oliver St John

Personal details
- Born: c. 1575
- Died: September 1633 (aged 57–58)
- Spouse: Elizabeth Tanfield (m. 1602)
- Children: 11, including Lucius, Patrick, Anne and Lucy
- Parent: Edward Cary (father)
- Relatives: Henry Knyvett (grandfather); John Carey (grandfather); Joyce Denny (grandmother); Francis Walsingham (uncle)
- Education: Exeter College, Oxford

Henry Cary, 1st Viscount Falkland, KB, PC (c. 1575 – September 1633) was an English landowner and politician who sat in the House of Commons from 1601 to 1622. He was created Viscount Falkland in the Scottish peerage in 1620. He was Lord Deputy of Ireland from 1622 until 1629.

== Early life ==
Cary was the son of Sir Edward Cary, of Berkhamsted and Aldenham, Hertfordshire, Master and Treasurer of His Majesty's Jewels, and his wife Katherine Knyvett or Knevet, daughter of Sir Henry Knyvett or Knevet, Master of the Jewel Office to Queen Elizabeth and King James, and wife Anne Pickering, and widow of Henry Paget, 2nd Baron Paget. His father was the son of Sir John Cary (d. 9 September 1552) and wife Joyce Denny (d. from 10 November 1560 to 30 January 1561) and nephew of Sir William Carey.

He entered Gray's Inn in 1590 and entered Exeter College, Oxford in 1593 at the age of sixteen. According to Wood, by the aid of a good tutor Cary became highly accomplished. Subsequently, he served in France and the Low Countries, and was taken prisoner by Don Luis de Velasco, probably at the Siege of Ostend (a fact referred to in the epigram on Sir Henry Cary by Ben Jonson). (Note: Henderson 1887, p. 240 states that Ben Jonson wrote: When no foe, that day, Could conquer thee but chance who did betray. In the following lines Ben Jonson draws a flattering portrait of Henry Carey: That neither fame nor love might wanting be To greatness, Carey, I sing that and thee, Whose house, if it no other had, In only thee, might be both great and glad; Who, to upbraid the sloth of this our time, Dost valour make almost if not a crime.)

== Court of Elizabeth I and James I ==
On his return to England Cary was introduced to court, and became Gentleman of the Bedchamber. He was knighted at Dublin in 1599. In 1601 he was elected Member of Parliament for Hertfordshire. He was a JP for Hertfordshire in 1601. He became joint master of the jewels with his father on 21 June 1603. In 1604 he was re-elected MP for Hertfordshire.

Henry Cary danced in Hymenaei, the masque at the wedding of Robert Devereux, 3rd Earl of Essex and Frances Howard on 5 January 1606. During the progress of Anne of Denmark in April 1613, Cary performed in the masque at Caversham Park.

At the investiture of Charles Prince of Wales in 1616 he was created a Knight of the Bath In 1617 he became Comptroller of the Household and a Privy Councillor. He succeeded to the family estates on the death of his father in 1618. He was created Viscount Falkland in the county of Fife, in the Scottish peerage on 10 November 1620 (the title, with his naturalisation, was confirmed by Charles I by diploma in 1627). In 1621 he was re-elected MP for Hertfordshire; his Scots peerage not barring him from sitting in the English Commons, as an English peerage would.

Chiefly through the favour of George Villiers, Duke of Buckingham Cary was appointed to succeed Sir Oliver St John, as Lord Deputy of Ireland. His patent was sealed in March 1622 and he was sworn on 18 September 1622. In office he showed himself both bigoted in his opinions and timid in carrying out a policy which continually dallied with extremes. Although he was conscientious, he was easily offended, and he failed to conduct himself with credit when confronted with any unusual difficulties.

Falkland was greatly distressed at the number of priests in Ireland and their influence over the people. He was influenced by a sermon of James Ussher on the text "He beareth not the sword in vain", and issued a proclamation on 21 January 1623, ordering their banishment from the country. This proclamation was highly inappropriate at the time because of the (ultimately unsuccessful) negotiations for the Spanish marriage of the Prince of Wales. In February 1624 he received an order from the English privy council to refrain from more extreme measures than preventing the erection of religious houses and the congregation of unlawful assemblies.

== Service under Charles I ==
Falkland convened an assembly of the nobility of Ireland on 22 September 1626, on account of the difficulties of maintaining the English army in Ireland. He laid before the assembly a draft of concessions promised by Charles, which were subsequently known as the "Graces". They promised the removal of certain religious disabilities and the recognition of sixty years' possession as a bar to all claims of the crown based on irregularities of title. Falkland did not conduct the negotiations with skill, and for a long time there seemed no hope of a satisfactory settlement. Finally in May 1628, a deputation from the nobility agreed, before the king and privy council at Whitehall, on certain additional concessions in the "Graces" and then confirmed, that Ireland should provide a sum of £4,000 for the army for three years.

Falkland believed that his difficulties with the nobility had been largely due to the intrigues of the Lord Chancellor of Ireland, Adam, Viscount Loftus, After the dissolution of the assembly of the nobility in 1627, he brought a charge against Loftus of malversation, and of giving encouragement to the nobility to refuse supplies. After the case had been heard in London, Lord Loftus was allowed to return to his duties pending further inquiry.

Falkland had for some years been engaged in tracking out what he supposed was a dangerous conspiracy of the Byrnes of Wicklow, and in August 1628 was able to announce to Charles I that the result of his protracted investigations had been successful, a true bill having been found against them at the Wicklow assizes. The aim of Falkland was to set up a plantation in Wicklow on the confiscated estates of the Byrnes, but as his designs were disapproved of by the commissioners of Irish causes, the king appointed a committee of the Irish privy council to investigate the matter more fully. Falkland took deep offence because one of the members of committee was the lord chancellor, Loftus and he refused to afford any assistance in the investigation on account of the "high indignity" offered to himself. When, as the result of the inquiry, it was discovered that the Byrnes had been the victims of false witnesses, Falkland was, on 10 August 1629, directed to hand over his authority to the lords justices on the pretext that his services were required in England. Charles I, recognising his good intentions, continued him in favour.

== Death ==
While hunting at Theobalds Park with Charles I, Cary fell from a stand and broke his leg. Gangrene set in and the leg was amputated. The operation was unsuccessful, and as the wound continued to bleed, Théodore de Mayerne and the Queen's surgeon Mauritius Aubert told him there was no hope. He died in September 1633. He was buried on 25 September 1633 at Aldenham.

== Patron of the arts ==
Falkland continued throughout his life to cultivate his literary tastes. An epitaph by him on Elizabeth, countess of Huntingdon, is given in Wilford's 'Memorials.' Among his papers was found The History of the Most Unfortunate Prince, King Edward II, with Choice Political Observations on Him and His Unhappy Favourites, Gaveston and Spencer, which was published with a preface attributed to Sir James Harrington in 1680. Falkland was in the habit of ingeniously concealing the year of his age in a knot flourished beneath his name, a device by which he is said to have detected a forger who had failed to recognise its significance.

== Family ==
Cary married, in 1602, Elizabeth Tanfield (1585–1639), daughter and heiress of Sir Lawrence Tanfield, lord chief baron of the exchequer, and his first wife, Elizabeth Symonds.

Elizabeth Tanfield was 16 or 17 years old at the time of the marriage and had a high reputation for her learning. In very early years she showed a strong inclination for the study of languages, mastering French, Spanish, Italian, Latin, Hebrew, and Transylvanian. She converted to Roman Catholicism when she was about nineteen years of age. However, she reportedly did not publicly acknowledge this until twenty years later.

Elizabeth accompanied her husband to Dublin, where she took a great interest in the establishment of industrial schools. When Cary learned of her change of faith they quarrelled, and she left Dublin in 1625. The Privy Council allowed her a separate maintenance of £500 a year. After her husband's return to England they became reconciled, but continued to live separately. On account of her change of faith, her father probably passed her over in his will (for the circumstances see under Lucius Cary). When her husband died she had only the annuity of £200 a year from her parents. She died in October 1639, aged 53 or 54.

One of the most intimate friends of Lady Falkland was William Chillingworth, but after his conversion to Protestantism she blamed him for endeavouring to pervert her children. She published a translation of French Cardinal Jacques Davy Duperron's reply to the attack on his works by King James, but the book was ordered burned. Afterwards she translated the whole of Perron's works for the benefit of scholars at Oxford and Cambridge, which was never printed. She also wrote in verse the lives of St Mary Magdalene, St Agnes the Martyr, and St Elizabeth of Portugal, as well as numerous hymns in honour of the Virgin Mary. The collected edition of the works of John Marston (1633) was dedicated to her.

Of the 11 children of Lord and Lady Falkland there are records of ten -- four sons and six daughters:

- Lucius, became 2nd Viscount Falkland but during his father's life was confined in the Fleet prison, his father's petition to the king praying for the release of his son, is preserved in the Harleian MS. 1581, where there are also four letters to Falkland from the Duke of Buckingham, has been printed in the Cabala.
- Lawrence (Lorenzo), was knighted and was killed fighting under Sir Charles Coote (the elder) at Battle of Swords in 1642.
- Patrick, was the author of some poems
- Catherine (d. 1625) married James Home, 2nd Earl of Home
- Placid (Henry), took Holy Orders in the Catholic Church
- Four daughters -- Anne, who had been maid of honour to the queen, Lucy, Elizabeth, and Mary -- became nuns in the Convent of Cambrai. Their religious names were, respectively, Magdelena, Mary, Augustina and Clementia.
- A fifth daughter, Victoria Cary, was a maid of honour at court and performed the masque The Shepherd's Paradise. She married Sir William Uvedale MP (1581–1652). One of their daughters, Elizabeth, married Edward Howard, 2nd Earl of Carlisle

== See also ==
- British colonization of the Americas

== Notes ==
Parliament of England
Preceded by Sir Robert Cecil; Rowland Lytton	Member of Parliament for Hertfordshire; 1601–1611, 1621–1622; With: Sir Robert Cecil 1601; Rowland Lytton 1604–1611; Sir Charles Morrison, 1st Baronet 1621–1622	Succeeded by Sir Charles Morrison, 1st Baronet; Sir William Lytton
Political offices
Preceded by Sir Oliver St John	Lord Deputy of Ireland; 1622–1629	Succeeded by Lords Justices
Peerage of Scotland
New creation	Viscount Falkland; 1620–1633	Succeeded by Lucius Cary
