= Nicholas Weston (MP for Newtown) =

English politician

Nicholas Weston (1611–1656) was an English politician who sat in the House of Commons in 1640. He supported the Royalist side in the English Civil War.

Weston was born at Roxwell, Essex, the son of the 1st Earl of Portland, and his second wife Frances Walgrave.

Weston's brother Jerome Weston, 2nd Earl of Portland was Governor of the Isle of Wight and in April 1640, Weston was elected Member of Parliament for Newtown in the Short Parliament. He was re-elected MP for Newtown in November 1640 for the Long Parliament. At the start of the Civil War, Weston was involved in the royalist defence of Portsmouth, and as a result of his actions was disabled for sitting in parliament in 1642.

Weston was unmarried. He died at the age of 45.

Parliament of England
Vacant Parliament suspended since 1629	Member of Parliament for Newtown; 1640–1642; With: Sir John Meux, 1st Baronet	Succeeded by Sir John Barrington, 3rd Baronet; Sir John Meux, 1st Baronet
