= Elizabeth Cary, Viscountess Falkland =

English poet and dramatist (1585–1639)

Lady Falkland
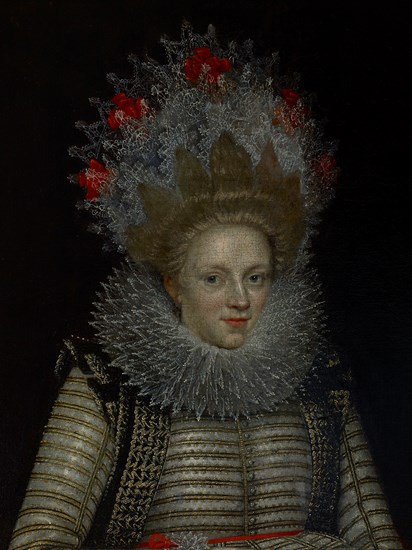
- portrait c. 1620
- Born: 1585; Burford Priory, Oxfordshire, England
- Died: 1639 (aged 53–54); London, England
- Occupations: Poet, translator, dramatist
- Spouse: Henry Cary, 1st Viscount Falkland
- Children: 11, including Lucius, Patrick, Anne and Lucy
- Parent(s): Lawrence Tanfield (father); Elizabeth Symondes (mother)
- Writing career
- Period: 1598–1639
- Notable work: The Tragedy of Mariam

Elizabeth Cary, Viscountess Falkland (née Tanfield; 1585–1639) was an English poet, dramatist, translator, and historian. She is the first woman known to have written and published an original play in English: The Tragedy of Mariam. From an early age, she was recognized by her contemporaries as an accomplished scholar.

== Biography ==
=== Early life ===
Elizabeth Tanfield was born in 1585 or 1586 at Burford Priory in Oxfordshire, the only child of Sir Lawrence Tanfield and his wife Elizabeth Symondes of Norfolk. Her father was a lawyer, who eventually became a judge and Lord Chief Baron of the Exchequer. Her parents were highly supportive of their daughter's love for reading and learning.

Elizabeth's parents employed a French instructor for her when she was five years old. Five weeks later, she was speaking fluently. After excelling in French, she insisted on learning Spanish, Italian, Latin, Hebrew, and Transylvanian on her own, without an instructor. Her accomplishment as a scholar was stressed by Michael Drayton and by John Davies of Hereford in works they dedicated to her.

Her father arranged her marriage at the age of 15 to Sir Henry Cary, later Viscount Falkland, who married her because she was an heiress. When she finally moved into her husband's home, her mother-in-law informed Cary that she was forbidden to read, so she instead chose to write poetry in her spare time.

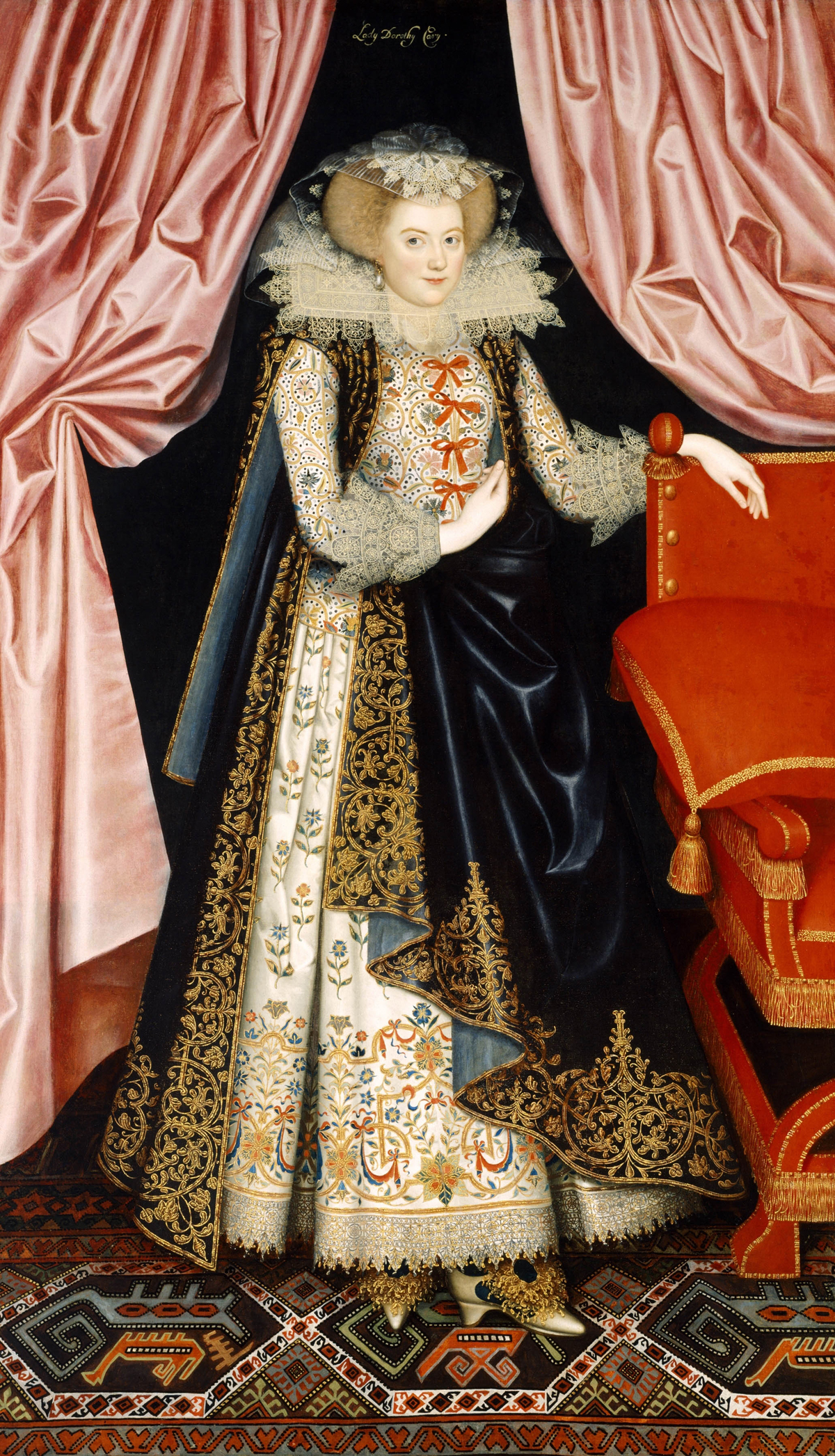
Probably Elizabeth Cary by William Larkin

It was not until seven years after they were married that Lord and Lady Falkland had children; they would go on to have a total of eleven: Catherine (1609–1625), Lucius (who later became the second Viscount Falkland; 1610–1643), Lorenzo (1613–1642), Anne (c.1614–1671), Edward (1616–1616), Elizabeth (1617–1683), Lucy (1619–1650), Victoria (1620–1692), Mary (1621–1693), Henry (born 1622), and Patrick (1623–1657).

In 1622 her husband was appointed Lord Deputy of Ireland and Elizabeth Cary joined him in Dublin. There she socialized with prominent local Catholics and patronized Catholic writers. This may have contributed to her conversion to Catholicism, though the death in childbirth of Cary's eldest daughter, Catherine, was said to have precipitated Cary's formal conversion: Catherine reported an apparition of the Virgin Mary while on her deathbed. This apparent sighting deeply moved Cary and furthered her mission to convert her surviving children, as Catherine had died a Protestant. Eventually, four of her daughters — Anne, Elizabeth, Lucy, and Mary — became Benedictine nuns and her son Henry joined the priesthood.

=== Later years ===
By 1625 Elizabeth Cary had been disinherited by her father, just before he died, for using part of her jointure to meet expenses. The money that was initially meant for her went instead to her eldest son, Lucius, who was strapped with debt. The disinheritance came after Cary had tried to aid her husband as he struggled to pay for his lands in Ireland. In 1626 she returned from Ireland and publicly announced her conversion to Catholicism, which resulted in Henry Cary's attempting to divorce her. He was unsuccessful, but he managed to deny her access to their children. Despite several orders of the Privy Council, he refused her maintenance in an apparent effort to force her to recant. She was banished from court in November 1626 for attending mass with Henrietta Maria without permission. In 1627 her residence was Cote House in Oxford.

Henry Cary died in 1633 and Cary sought to regain custody of her children. She was questioned in the Star Chamber for kidnapping her sons — she had previously, and more easily, regained custody of her daughters — but although she was threatened with imprisonment there is no record of any punishment. In 1634 Elizabeth, Mary, Lucy, and Anne Cary were converted to the Catholic faith by John Fursdon, who was their mother's confessor. Edward Barrett reported this to King Charles I and the King agreed that the four girls be removed from their mother's house and taken to Great Tew, an estate inherited by her son Lucius Cary, who was then Viscount Falkland.

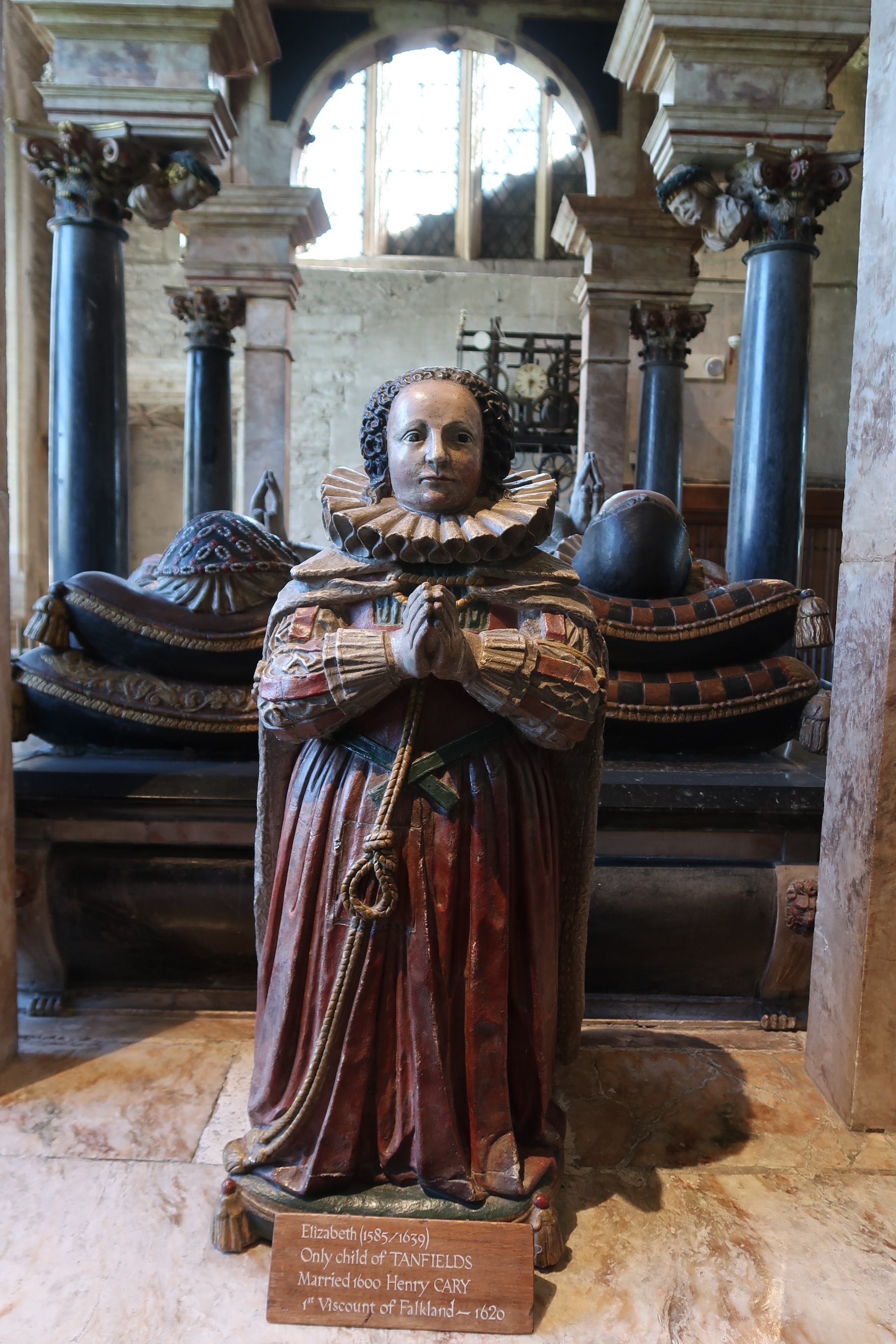
From the Tanfield Tomb in St John Baptist, Burford

In 1639, Elizabeth Cary, Lady Falkland, died in London. She was buried in Henrietta Maria's Chapel in Somerset House.

== Writing ==
According to the biography by her daughter Lucy Cary, Elizabeth Cary saw poetry as the highest literary form. Many of her poems have been lost, but her dedication to the form is clear in her plays. Her first or possibly second play, The Tragedy of Mariam, the Fair Queen of Jewry (1613), was written in iambic pentameter. Change in pattern and rhyme scheme indicate multiple sonnets embedded throughout the play. The Tragedy of Mariam was the first original English play to be published by a woman.

Elizabeth Cary then wrote The History of the Life, Reign, and Death of Edward II (1626/1627), which was a political fable based on historical events. It was not published until 1680, decades after her death. The text uses the story of King Edward II and his powerful favourites, Gaveston and Spencer, as an analogy for King Charles, who in the 1620s was in conflict with Parliament about the power granted to the Duke of Buckingham. Cary was in constant contact with Buckingham and his family. Writing The History may have been her way to cope with having to rely constantly on the Buckinghams. She focuses on the idea of favouritism throughout the piece and how it can lead to disastrous outcomes. Other than the Tragedy of Mariam and the History, much of Falkland's original work has been lost, including most of her poetry. Despite only a fraction of her oeuvre having survived, however, her work has generated "a veritable critical industry" since the 1990s.

== Works ==
- The mirror of the world, a translation of Abraham Ortelius's Le mirroir du monde (1598)
- The Tragedy of Mariam, the Fair Queen of Jewry (pub. 1613)
- Reply of the most Illustrious Cardinal of Perron (1630)
- The History of the Life, Reign and Death of Edward II, or The History of the most Unfortunate Prince, King Edward II (published 1680)
