= Richard Whalley (died c. 1632) =

English politician

Richard Whalley (c. 1558 – c. 1632), of Kirton and Screveton, Nottinghamshire, was an English politician.

He was a Member (MP) of the Parliament of England for Nottinghamshire in 1597 and for Boroughbridge in 1601. He married Frances, sister of Joan Barrington, who was an aunt of Oliver Cromwell.
