= Francis Barrington =

English Puritan activist and politician

Sir Francis Barrington JP

Member of Parliament for Essex
- In office December 1620 – July 1628

Deputy Lord Lieutenant of Essex
- In office 1603–1626

Personal details
- Born: 1560 Barrington Hall, Essex
- Died: 3 July 1628 (aged 68) London
- Resting place: St Mary the Virgin, Hatfield Broad Oak
- Spouse: Joan Cromwell (1579–his death)
- Children: Thomas (c. 1585 – 1644), Robert (?–1642), Francis, John (?–1631), Elizabeth
- Education: Trinity College, Cambridge
- Occupation: Landowner, politician and Puritan activist

Sir Francis Barrington, 1st Baronet of Barrington Hall, Essex (c. 1560 – 3 July 1628) was a Puritan activist and politician, who was MP for Essex from 1601 to 1604, then 1620 to 1628.

One of the wealthiest members of the Essex gentry, Barrington was a strong advocate of reforming the Church of England, with family connections to many other Puritan activists. This allowed him to exercise significant influence within Parliament, where he opposed the religious and foreign policies of James and Charles I.

In 1626, he was imprisoned for refusing to help collect the Forced Loan, an attempt by Charles to levy taxes without Parliament's approval that prefigured later struggles over Ship Money in the 1630s. Barrington was released due to ill health in January 1628 but died on 3 July.

His opposition made him a popular hero within the Puritan community; forty years after his death in 1670, he was described as "one of the mirrors of our time".

== Personal details ==
Barrington was born in 1560, eldest son of Sir Thomas Barrington of Hatfield Broad Oak, Essex (1530-1581) and his second wife Winifred Pole (c.1525-1602), youngest daughter of Baron Montagu and related by marriage to the Calvinist Earl of Huntingdon. Sir Thomas himself was a devout Puritan, (Note: "Puritan" was a generic term for those who wanted to "purify" the Protestant Church of England of what they considered "Catholic" practices; while sharing certain beliefs, such as the removal of bishops, it consisted of many different sects, Presbyterians being the most common.) who passed his beliefs onto his son; Winifred was fined as a Catholic recusant in 1582, but converted to Protestantism just before her death in 1602.

He had a half-sister from his father's first marriage, Elizabeth (c. 1550-1583), a younger brother Henry, who died without children, and a sister, Katherine (c.1565–1623), who married William Bourchier (1599-1631). Her eldest son John Bourchier (1595-1660) was a regicide who voted for the Execution of Charles I in January 1649.

In 1579, Barrington married Joan Cromwell (c.1568-1641), aunt to the future Parliamentarian leaders Oliver Cromwell and John Hampden. Demonstrating once again the close connections within the Puritan community, her sister Frances married Richard Whalley, and their son Edward Whalley was another regicide.

They had nine surviving children, including four sons, Thomas (c.1585-1644), Robert (?-1642), Francis (?-before 1628) and John (?-1631), who died in the Netherlands during the Eighty Years War. Of their five daughters, Elizabeth was married to Sir William Masham, and Mary to Sir Gilbert Gerard, Winifred to Sir William Meux. All three of his sons-in-law and his two elder sons were MPs at one stage or another; these family connections put Barrington at the centre of a powerful political clique.

== Career ==
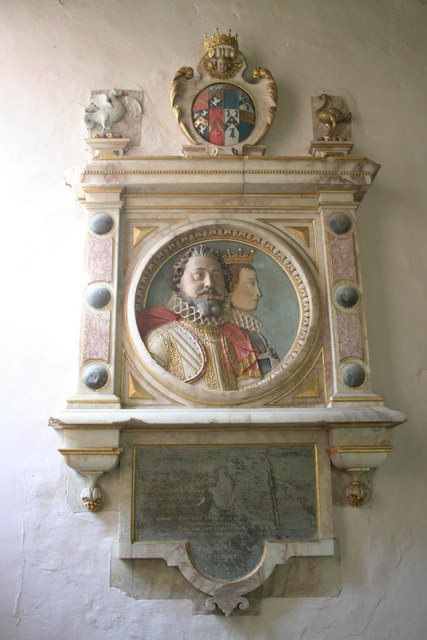
Monument to the Puritan Robert Rich, 1st Earl of Warwick; Barrington shared and supported his religious and political policies

Barrington graduated from Trinity College, Cambridge in 1580, then travelled to Geneva, birthplace of John Calvin, where he was joined by his Puritan cousin Francis Hastings. He returned home in late 1581 and played an active role in local administration, although he was first elected as MP for Essex in 1601. The next year, he inherited his mother's extensive estates in Yorkshire, Lincolnshire and the Isle of Wight, further expanding his political influence.

After Elizabeth I died in March 1603, Barrington was invited to Theobalds House in Hertfordshire to greet the new king James I on his progress from Edinburgh to London, and wrote to his tailor for advice on what clothes he should wear. Knighted by James, he was re-elected for Essex in 1604 with the support of Robert Rich, 1st Earl of Warwick, a devout Calvinist. The two men created a political alliance between their families that continued into the 1640s and beyond; another Puritan, the Earl of Sussex, whose main residence was in Essex, was appointed Lord Lieutenant of Essex in 1603, with Barrington serving as his Deputy.

Barrington compiled a report for Parliament detailing Essex clergy considered religiously unsound and sat on various commissions for regulating the Church of England. While he rarely spoke in the Commons, he was nominated to so many committees, he could not attend them all. His status was recognised in 1606 when he became an honorary member of Gray's Inn, but in 1607 he was removed as a local JP for his opposition to the political union between England and Scotland, the centrepiece of James' legislative agenda. Restored as a JP in 1610, on 29 June 1611 he purchased a baronetcy for £1,095 in the newly created Baronetage of England. He did not stand for election to the short-lived "Addled Parliament" in 1614.

Barrington used his wealth and family connections to increase his estates and political power; in 1612, he purchased Hatfield Manor from Robert Rich for £8,000, and began construction of Barrington Hall. He also tried to acquire nearby Hatfield Forest, pursuing an unsuccessful vendetta against its Catholic owner, Lord Monteagle. After Rich's death in 1619, Barrington became the senior political figure in Essex and was elected to Parliament in 1621 and 1624. As well as advocating the appointment of Puritan clergy to positions within the Church of England, Barrington was an enthusiastic patron of "godly clergy", one of his close friends being James Ussher, head of the Church of Ireland from 1625 to 1656.

Like Barrington's son John, many English contemporaries fought in the Thirty Years War and were concerned by James' pro-Spanish policy and failure to support his son-in-law Frederick V of the Palatinate. He died in March 1625 and was succeeded by his son Charles I, who called a new Parliament in April. As MP for Essex, Barrington backed the Duke of Buckingham, who wanted to declare war on Spain; he was appointed to the committee charged with its preparation and initiated action against the pro-Spanish Earl of Middlesex. However, this session saw the start of conflict over taxes such as Ship Money that dominated Charles' reign and ultimately lead to the First English Civil War in August 1642.

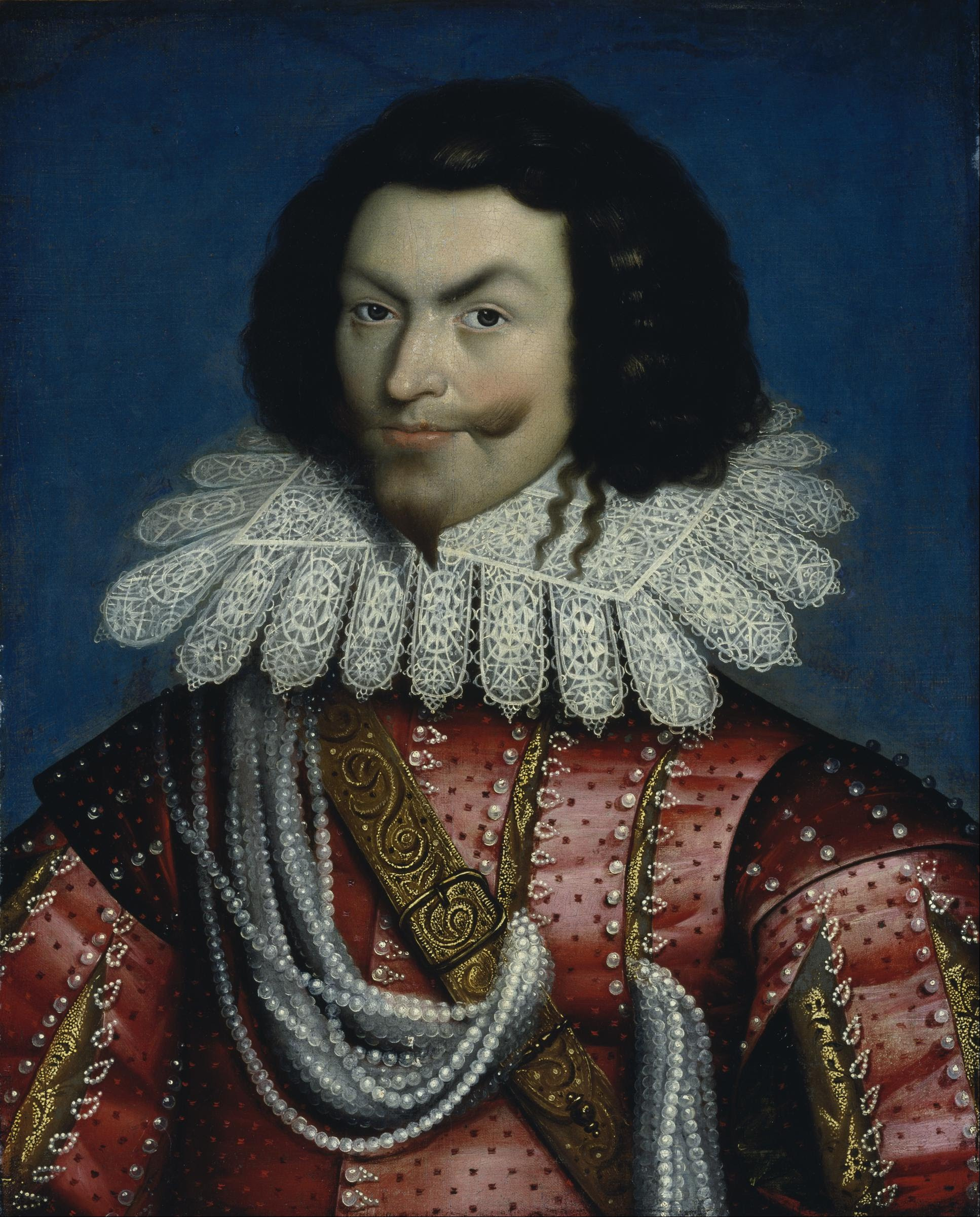
Buckingham; Barrington backed his anti-Spanish policy but supported efforts to impeach him in 1626

During peacetime, "Tonnage and poundage", or customs duties, were the Crown's main source of income and generally approved for the entire reign. Parliament now sought to make this an annual grant, increasing control over policy, an action unacceptable to Charles who dissolved it in August. He tried to win support from moderates by declaring war on Spain in September; directed by Buckingham, the result was the disastrous Cádiz expedition.

When Parliament was recalled in 1626 to approve new taxes, they insisted Buckingham first be impeached; Charles refused and dissolved it in June. Although not directly involved, his son Thomas sat on several committees set up to review Buckingham's conduct of the war; Barrington was clearly seen as an opponent since he was removed as Deputy Lieutenant of Essex and once again lost his position as a Justice of the Peace.

Having failed to obtain money from Parliament, in September Charles imposed a Forced Loan to fund his foreign policy. Barrington was appointed a Commissioner for its collection in Essex, effectively making him liable for the entire amount; when he refused, he was arrested and held in the Marshalsea prison, along with his wife and daughter Ruth. His health rapidly declined and he was released in January 1628. Viewed as a popular hero for his opposition to the Loan, Barrington was re-elected in March 1628, but died on 3 July. He was succeeded by his son Thomas and buried at the church of St Mary the Virgin, in Hatfield Broad Oak.

== Sources ==
- Burke, John (1841). A Genealogical and Heraldic History of the Extinct and Dormant Baronetcies of England, Ireland and Scotland. Scott, Webster, and Geary.
- Collins, Arthur (1741). The English Baronetage: Containing a Genealogical and Historical Account of All the English Baronets, Volume I. Thomas Wotton.
- Courthope, William (1835). Synopsis of the Extinct Baronetage of England. G. Woodfall.
- Cust, Richard (1985). "Charles I, the Privy Council, and the Forced Loan". Journal of British Studies. 24 (2): 208–235. doi:10.1086/385832. JSTOR 175703. S2CID 143537267.
- Lowndes, G. Alan (1878). "The History of the Barrington Family". Transactions of the Essex Archaeological Society. 1.
- Lowndes, G. Alan (1870). Seventh Report of the Royal Commission on Historical Manuscripts. HMSO.
- MacDonald, William W (1969). "John Pym: Parliamentarian". Historical Magazine of the Protestant Episcopal Church. 38 (1).
- Russell, Conrad (1995). King James VI and I and His English Parliaments: The Trevelyan Lectures Delivered at the University of Cambridge. ISBN 978-0198205067.
- Spurr, John (1998). English Puritanism, 1603-1689. Palgrave. ISBN 978-0333601884.
- Scott, David (2004). "Bourchier, Sir John (1595-1660)". Oxford Dictionary of National Biography (online ed.). Oxford University Press. doi:10.1093/ref:odnb/2991. (Subscription, Wikipedia Library access or UK public library membership required.)
- Seale, Arthur (1983). Barrington family letters, 1628-1632. Royal Historical Society.
- Thrush, Andrew (2010). BARRINGTON, Sir Francis (c.1560-1628), of Barrington Hall and Priory House, Hatfield Broad Oak, Essex and Hackney, Mdx in The History of Parliament: the House of Commons 1604-1629. CUP. Archived from the original on 25 January 2021.
- Thrush, Andrew (2004). "Barrington, Sir Francis, first baronet (c. 1560–1628)". Oxford Dictionary of National Biography (online ed.). Oxford University Press. doi:10.1093/ref:odnb/70627. (Subscription, Wikipedia Library access or UK public library membership required.)
- Usher, Brett (2004). "Rich, Robert, first earl of Warwick (1559?-1619)". Oxford Dictionary of National Biography (online ed.). Oxford University Press. doi:10.1093/ref:odnb/61021. (Subscription, Wikipedia Library access or UK public library membership required.)

Parliament of England
Preceded by William Petre; John Wentworth	Member of Parliament for Essex; 1601–1611; With: Henry Maynard 1601; Sir Edward Denny 1604–1611	Succeeded by Sir Robert Rich; Sir Richard Weston
Preceded by Sir Robert Rich; Sir Richard Weston	Member of Parliament for Essex; 1621–1628; With: Sir John Deane 1621–1622; Sir Thomas Cheek 1624; Sir Arthur Harris 1625; Sir Harbottle Grimston 1626–1628	Succeeded by Sir Harbottle Grimston; Robert Rich, Lord Rich
Baronetage of England
New creation	Baronet (of Barrington Hall); 1611–1628	Succeeded by Thomas Barrington
