= John Fursdon =

English Benedictine monk

John Fursdon, in religion Cuthbert (died 1638), was an English Benedictine monk.

== Life ==
Fursdon was the eldest son of Philip Fursdon of Fursdon in the parish of Cadbury, Devonshire, was born at Thorverton, Devonshire. He became an enthusiastic disciple of Father Augustine Baker, his father's chaplain, and proceeded to the Benedictine convent of St. Gregory at Douay, where, after completing the year of probation, he took the solemn vows as a professed father of the order on 25 November 1620. Returning to the English mission, he laboured chiefly in the southern counties, and he appears to have often resided in the families of Viscount Montagu and Lady Elizabeth Falkland. He was an instrument in the conversion of Anne Cary and Lady Falkland's three other daughters, and of Hugh Paulinus, or Serenus, Cressy Fursdon, who frequently passed under the assumed name of Breton, died in Lady Falkland's house in London on 2 February 1637–8.

== Works ==
1. 'The Life of the ... Lady Magdalen, Viscountesse Montague, written in Latin ... by Richard Smith [bishop of Chalcedon], and now translated into English by C. F.,’ 1627, 4to, dedicated to Antony Maria, viscount Montague.
2. 'The Life and Miracles of St. Benedict,’ 1638, 12mo, with plates.
3. 'The Rule of St. Bennet, by C. F.,’ Douay, 1638, 4to, dedicated to 'Mrs. Anne Carie, daughter of the Lord Viscount Faulkland.' A new edition by 'one of the Benedictine Fathers of St. Michael's, near Hereford [i.e. Francis Cuthbert Doyle], was published at London, 1875, 8vo.
