= Judith Barrington (gentlewoman) =

English estate manager (1500s–1657)

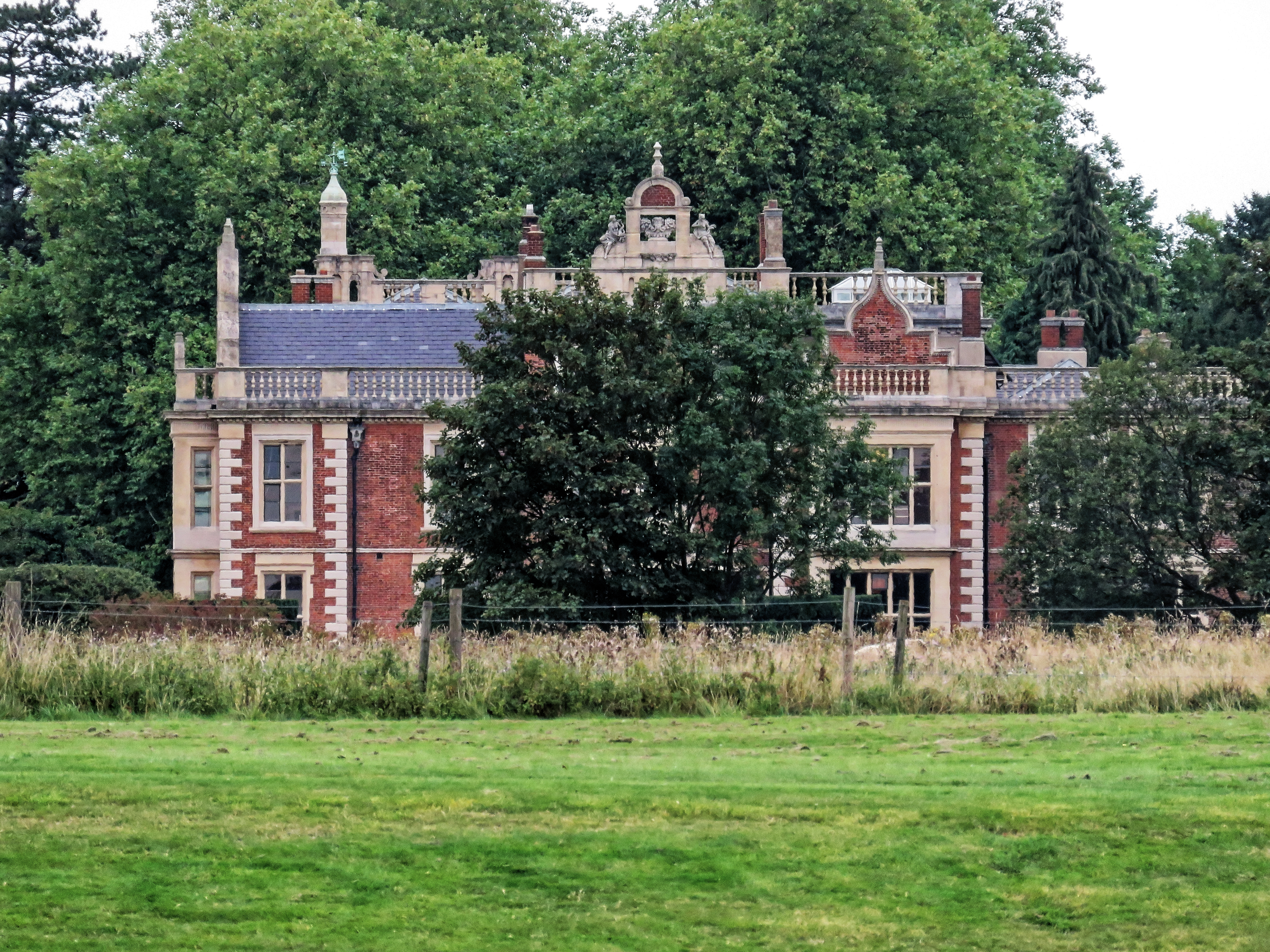
- Barrington Hall, Hatfield Broad Oak, Essex
- Born: Judith Lytton married in 1612
- Died: 1657
- Other names: Judith Smith
- Occupation: Estate manager
- Known for: managing the estates of both of her husbands
- Spouses: Sir George Smith, Sir Thomas Barrington, 2nd Baronet
- Children: 2

Judith, Lady Barrington born Judith Lytton also Judith Smith (1500s – 1657) was an English estate manager, supporter of clergy and a gentlewoman.

== Life ==
Barrington's Puritan parents lived at Knebworth House. Her father, Roland Lytton, was a member of parliament. She married Sir George Smith of Annables, Harpenden, in 1612 and they had two children. Her husband died leaving her and their two sons in debt. She shrewdly managed the estate and took on the wardship of their sons. She was admired and she was said to have turned down marriage proposals until she accepted that of Sir Thomas Barrington, 2nd Baronet. They were both supporters of the Puritan faith. In 1640, Benjamin King dedicated his book of sermons, The Marriage of the Lambe, to her and her husband evidencing their support for Puritan clergy.

Barrington continued to manage her estate from her first marriage and she also took on the management of her second husband's estates even after her inherited further interests in Lincolnshire and the Isle of Wight in 1628. She had a steward but he followed instructions as she considered herself "the manager of all things". Her notes are extant and show that from 1612 she was taking an interest in her estate and tenants. She mitigated the effects rent on families who had financial problems and she demonstrated a good knowledge of trees and especially fruit trees.

The Long Parliament began in 1620 and her husband as a member would spend long periods in London. She corresponded with him keeping him abreast of local events and advising him on who might be a good assistant. Her husband outlived the Long Parliament and died in 1644 when her management became troubled. She ended up in legal disputes with her stepson, Sir John Barrington, 3rd Baronet who was a lawyer who had been knighted in 1635. Her husband had been in debt and because of this, Sir John, was held in the Fleet Prison. Sir John sent a petition to parliament alleging that Judith was removing timber from the estate to sell and that this damaged its value. There were a large number of disputes and her biographer, Caroline M. K. Bowden, believes that she had the expertise and that she was in the right.

Her correspondence shows that she had good relations with the test of the Barrington family, notable her mother-in-law, Joan Barrington, who was also known for her management and support of clergy.

Barrington died in 1657 and she was buried at Knebworth.
