= Patrick Cary =

Patrick Cary (Carey) (c. 1623 – 1657) was an English poet, an early user in English of the triolet form.

== Life ==
He was a younger son of Henry Cary, 1st Viscount Falkland, by Elizabeth Cary née Tanfield. At an early age he was sent to France, to be brought up a Catholic. After staying there three years he went to Italy, where he resided for twelve years.

Cary's parents

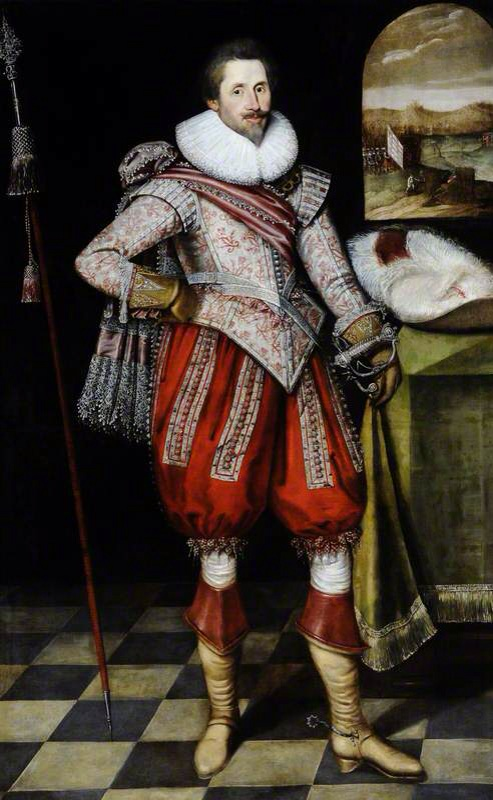
Henry Cary, his father

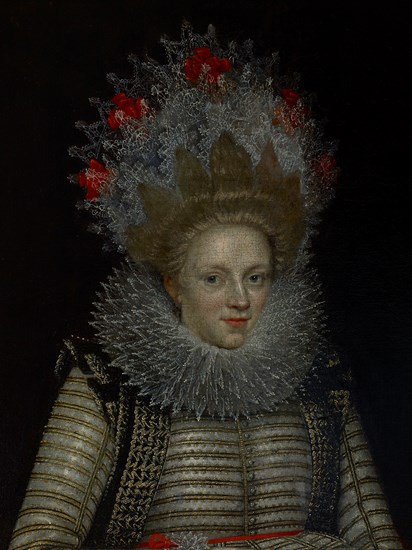
Elizabeth Cary, his mother

For some time he received a small pension from Queen Henrietta Maria, and subsequently he was provided for by Pope Urban VIII: an abbey and a priory in commendam, with other benefices. In Rome he met both John Milton and John Evelyn.

On 18 March 1650 Cary wrote from Brussels to Sir Edward Hyde in distress. He was unwilling to take orders, but if Sir Edward could not help him soon he must enter a convent. Cary became a Benedictine at Douai, but left within a year. He then came to England. After an aimless period, and giving up his Catholic faith, he trained for the law, being admitted to Lincoln's Inn in 1652. He died in Ireland in 1657.

== Works ==
Walter Scott edited, from a manuscript in the author's autograph, Trivial Poems and Triolets. Written in obedience to Mrs. Tomkin's commands. By Patrick Carey, 20 Aug 1651, London, 1820. The first part consists of Trivial Ballads, and the second part, dated from Warnefurd. 1661, of Triolets, hymns original and translated, and other religious poems. Scott was not aware of Cary's background when he edited the poems; he made the identification subsequently, as appears from a note in Woodstock. Some poems had been previously published under the title of Poems from a manuscript written in the time of Oliver Cromwell, London, 1771. This manuscript was in the possession of the Rev. Pierrepoint Cromp. This first edition contains nine, and the second thirty-seven poems.

The Poems of Patrick Cary, edited by Veronica Delany, was published in 1978.

In the Brotherton Collection, University of Leeds, is an autograph manuscript of "Ballades dedicated to the Lady Victoria Uvedale" (1652/53). The manuscript contains illustrations by the poet and an inscription "Ballades composed, and transcribed by Iohn-Patricke Carey, when Hee had little else to doe". It contains only 13 of Cary's poems and was identified in 1984.

George Saintsbury included Cary's poems in his monumental Minor Poets of the Caroline Period (1906).

== Family ==
He married Susan Uvedale in 1653. They had a son Edward (c.1656–1692), father of Lucius Henry Cary, 6th Viscount Falkland from whom later holders of the Scottish peerage title Viscount Falkland descended.
