= Barrington baronets =

Set index for Barrington baronets

There have been two baronetcies created for people with the surname Barrington. As of 2026 one creation is extant.

- Barrington baronets of Barrington Hall (1611)
- Barrington baronets of Limerick (1831)
