= Barrington Hall, Essex =

House in Hatfield Broad Oak, Essex, UK

Coordinates: 51.8359°N 0.2479°E

Barrington Hall is a Grade II* listed 18th-century English country house in Hatfield Broad Oak, Essex, England.

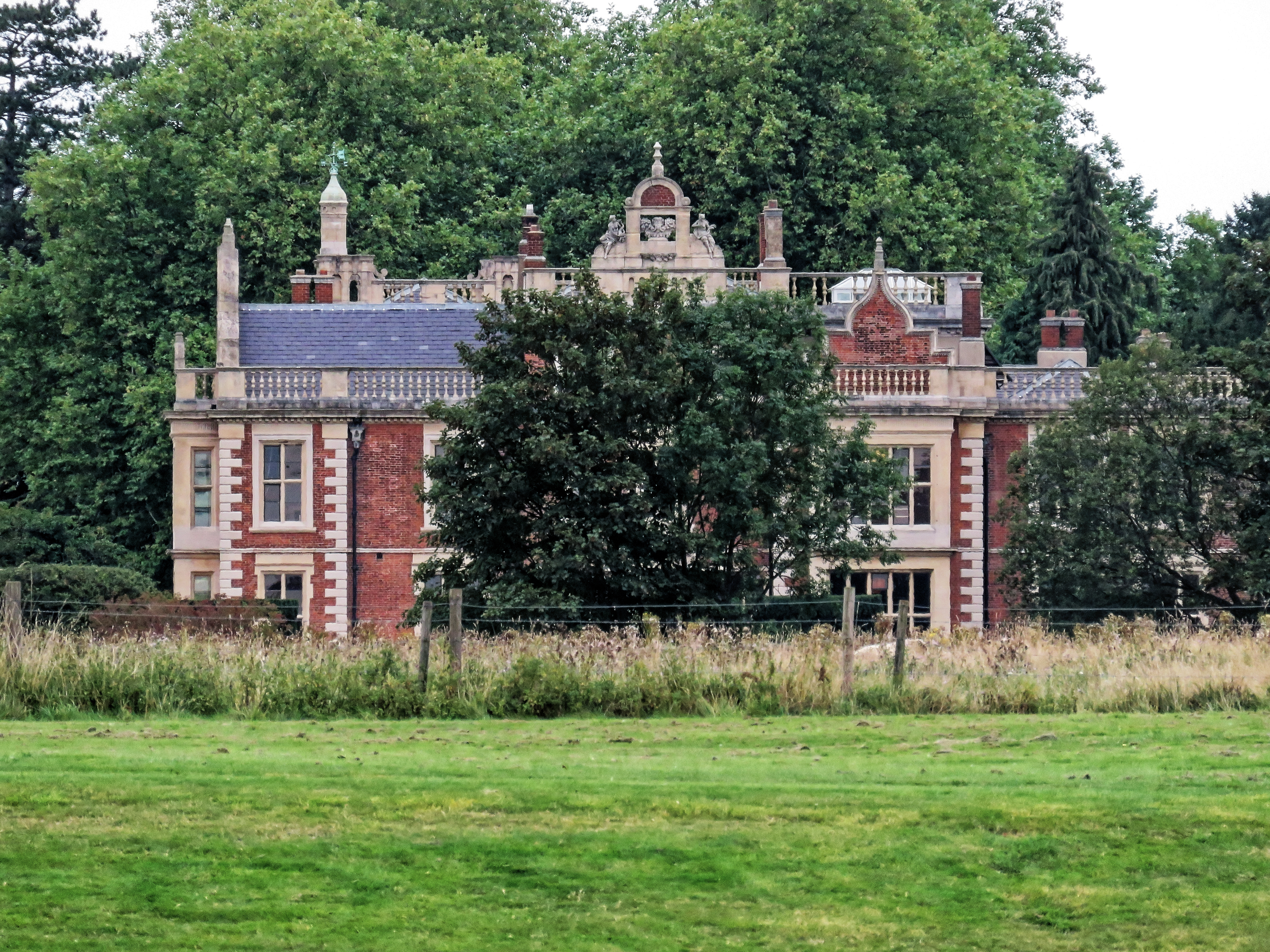
Barrington Hall

Barrington Hall is built in red brick, in both two and three storeys, with a balustraded parapet and a number of ornamentally shaped Dutch gables. The south front of the house has a central block centrepiece with carved figures. It was Grade II* listed in 1975, its listing stating: "c.1734 and mid C19. Of red brick with stone dressings and rusticated stone quoins."

== History ==
The original manor of Hatfield Broad Oak was bought by Sir Francis Barrington in 1612. The Barringtons were the hereditary woodwards (foresters) of Hatfield Forest. Prior to 1600 the family seat was an earlier Barrington Hall, which once stood on a moated site north of the village of Hatfield Broad Oak. In 1735, John Shales Barrington succeeded his cousin the 5th Baronet Barrington to the estate. He began to build a new Georgian manor but the plan was not concluded until after his death and the house was not occupied on a permanent basis until 1863. After his death, the house was owned by Sir Fitzwilliam Barrington. The Barrington family sold their interest in Hatfield Forest in 1832 to John Archer Houblon after the death of Sir Fitzwilliam Barrington.

In 1863, the Hall was still not occupied; it was inherited by George Alan Lowndes, a distant relative of the Barringtons. Lowndes adopted the surname after inheriting the estate; previously, his patronymic was Clayton. He arranged to have it remodeled in a neo-Jacobean style to the design of Edward Browning and lived at Barrington until his death in 1904. The property was then sold in 1908 to Alfred Gosling, whose family held it until selling it to the British Livestock Company in 1977 for use as offices. Following this, in 1980 the hall was sold to Contemporary Perfumers Ltd. In 2012 the property was offered for sale for £5,000,000, and in 2014 it was purchased by the developer Silvertown Properties. After an extensive restoration it was listed for sale in 2019 with a guide price of £15,000,000 including 41.25 acres of grounds.
