= Hatfield Broad Oak =

Village in Essex, England

Coordinates: 51.82712°N 0.24257°E

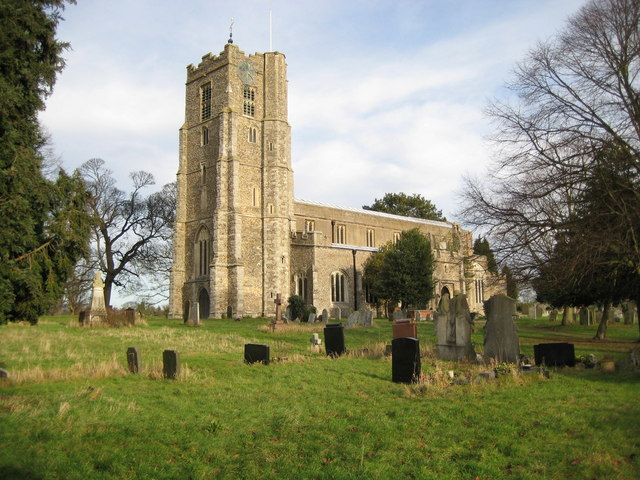
- The Church of St Mary the Virgin

- Location within Essex
- Population: 1,238 (Parish, 2021)
- OS grid reference: TL546166
  - London: 25 mi (40 km) SW
- District: Uttlesford
- Shire county: Essex
- Region: East
- Country: England
- Sovereign state: United Kingdom
- Post town: Bishop's Stortford
- Postcode district: CM22
- Dialling code: 01279
- Police: Essex
- Fire: Essex
- Ambulance: East of England
- UK Parliament: Harlow

Hatfield Broad Oak (historically also known as Hatfield Regis) is a village and civil parish in the Uttlesford district of Essex, England. The village is approximately 5 miles (8 km) south-east of Bishop's Stortford. Near the church of St Mary the Virgin is former Benedictine priory Hatfield Regis Priory. At the 2021 census the parish had a population of 1,238.

== History ==
Traces of Bronze Age occupation have been found in the parish, including the Portingbury Hills mound in Hatfield Forest.

The settlement of Hatfield was well established by the time of the Norman Conquest and its Domesday Book population of 115 put it as the ninth largest settlement in Essex. At one time a royal manor of Harold I, it fell under the possession of William I. Popular for hunting in the neighbouring forest, its royal patronage led to its becoming known as Hatfield Regis, or King's Hatfield, partly to distinguish it from Hatfield Peverel, also in Essex.

By the time the priory was dissolved, the town had over 1000 residents.

The name Hatfield Broad Oak has been used since at least 1136, and the eponymous oak was mentioned in record in 1295. The forest still contains the fenced remains of a very large oak known as the "Doodle Oak", estimated as 850 years old, though it is believed to be a different tree to that which gave the parish its name. Hatfield Forest is an ancient woodland, a Site of Special Scientific Interest (SSSI) and a National Nature Reserve (NNR). It is now in the possession of the National Trust. The modern hedges in Hatfield Broad Oak still follow the boundaries of the ancient forest following clearances known as assarting. A phonetic version of the name might be that recorded in 1381 as "Hatfeld Broodhook"

Hatfield was at one time a thriving market town. At the time of the 2001 Census it had a population of 1,600. By the 2021 census, the population had declined to 904.

== Community ==
At around 8,800 acres (36 km^{2}) the parish is one of the largest in Essex, stretching 4 miles (6 km) north of the village, and was formerly divided into four "quarters": Town Quarter, Woodrow Quarter, Heath Quarter, and Broomsend Quarter. At the north end of the parish lies Hatfield Forest, known for its large oak trees. Approximately 1 mile (1.6 km) to the north of the village, and included in the parish, is the small village of Bush End, with its church, the Grade II listed St John the Evangelist, which dates to 1856.

The Cock Inn, a public house, dates to the fifteenth century.

St Mary's Church of England primary school was opened in 1816 as a National school.

Every May Bank holiday since 1985 a 10 kilometre road race is held using a course running around the village.

=== Church ===
A Saxon church was present in Hatfield at the time of the Domesday Book. The present parish church of St Mary the Virgin is early medieval, and has a stone tower with eight bells. The largest weighs 17cwt and was cast in 1782 by Patrick & Osborn, a private bell foundry, who at the time worked in direct competition to Whitechapel Bell Foundry.

The parish church was at one time part of the priory church but was rebuilt for separate parochial use towards the end of the fourteenth century and extended over the next century.

The nave contains the mutilated stone effigy of Robert de Vere, 3rd Earl of Oxford, who was buried in the church in 1221. The writings belonging to the Barrington family of Barrington Hall are deposited in the north vestry; which is believed to have been part of the priory chapel. In the other vestry is a library, placed there in 1708, by Sir Charles Barrington.

== Governance ==
Hatfield Broad Oak is part of the electoral ward called Broad Oak and the Hallingburys. The population of this ward at the 2011 census was 3,571.

== See also ==
- The Hundred Parishes
- Barrington Hall, Essex
