= John Wrey =

Sheriff of Cornwall in 1587

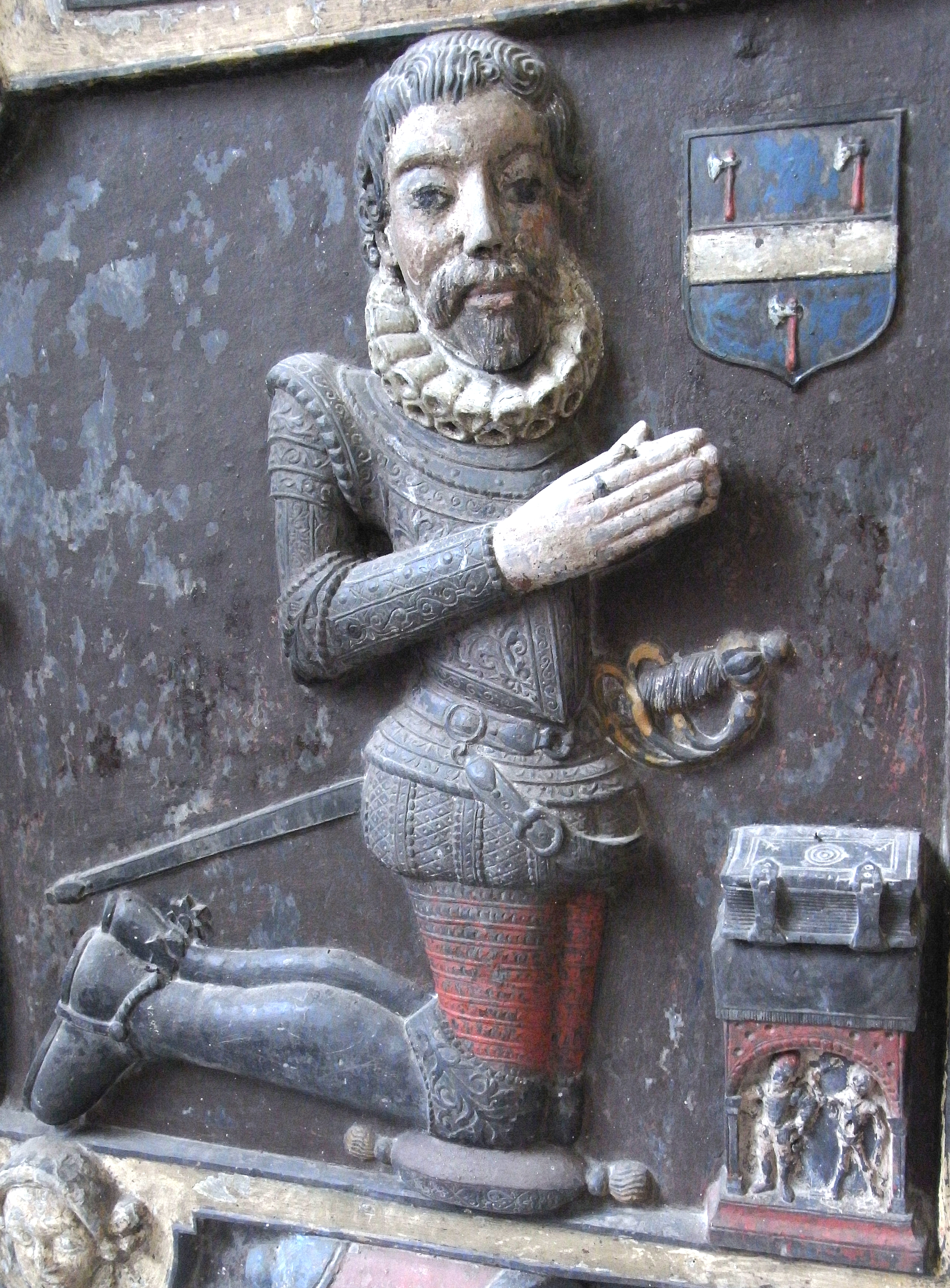
Effigy of John Wrey (d. 1597) of Trebeigh, St Ive, Cornwall. The monument was moved from St Ive Church to its present position against the east wall of the north transept of St Peter's Church, Tawstock, Devon, in 1924 by Sir Philip Bourchier Sherard Wrey, 12th Baronet (1858–1936), of Tawstock Court.

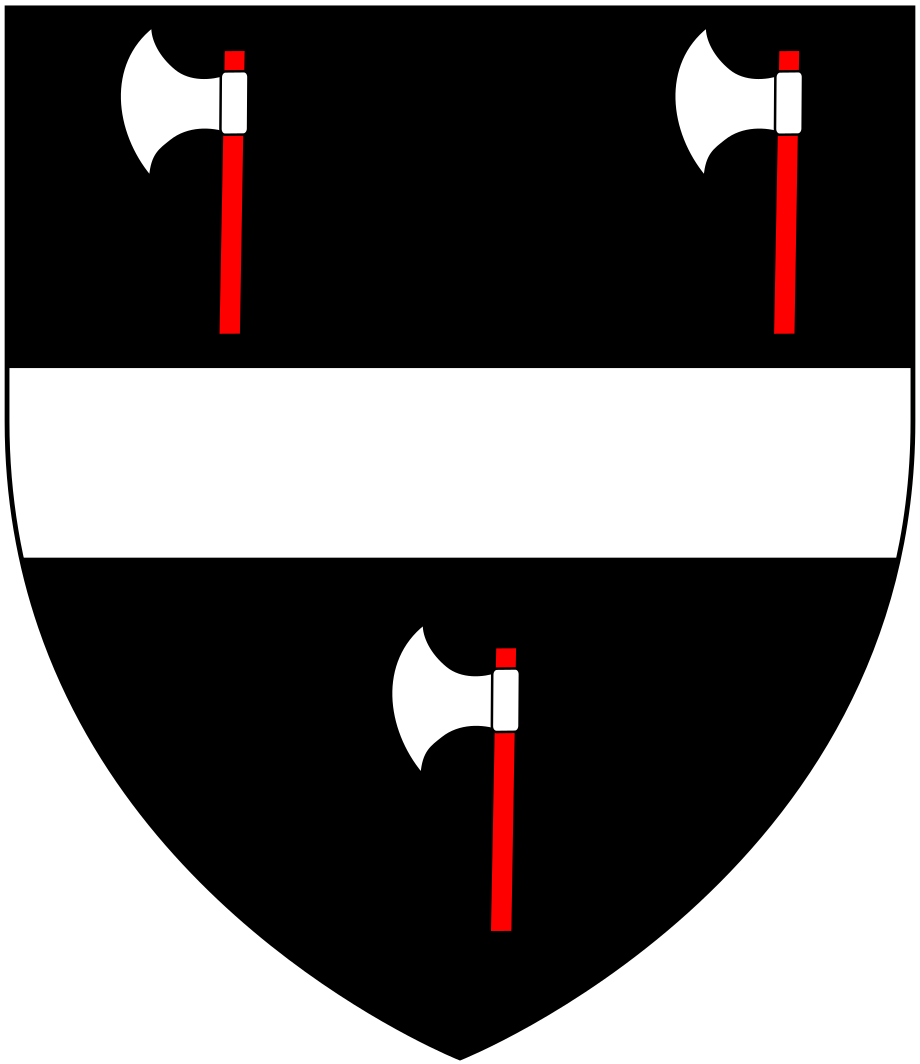
Arms of Wrey of Trebeigh, Cornwall and Tawstock, Devon: Sable, a fesse between three pole-axes argent helved gules

John Wrey (died 1597) of North Russell, Sourton, and Bridestowe in Devon and Trebeigh, St Ive, Cornwall, was Sheriff of Cornwall in 1587.

== Origins ==
He was the son and heir of Walter Wrey of North Russell by his wife Bridget Shilstone, daughter of Robert Shilstone. A branch of the Shilstone family (which took its name (originally de Shilston) from the manor of Shilston, anciently Shilfeston, in the parish of Drews Teignton, Devon) was seated at this period within the parish of Bridestowe, near North Russell. Elizabeth Shilstone (d.1605), the only daughter and heiress of (another) "Robert Shilstone of Bridestowe", married Sir Peter Courtenay (d.1552) of Ugbrooke, Sheriff of Devon in 1548/9, 2nd son of Sir William III Courtenay (1477–1535) "The Great", of Powderham. Pole also mentions, without context, a certain "Sir Robert Shilston of Woode", who bore the same arms as Shilston of Shilston: Ermine, a saltire azure between four cross-crosslets(/patées) fitchée sable.

== Wrey Family origins ==
The le Wrey family was believed by Betham (1771), due to its unusual prefixed adjunct, to have taken its name from some office of unidentified duties, "the wrey". At least three historic estates, all in South Devon near to Okehampton and Dartmoor, have been suggested by various sources to have been the origin of the Wrey family, later Wrey Baronets:

=== Wray, Moretonhampstead ===
It has been suggested that the family took its name from the estate of Wray in the parish of Moretonhampstead in Devon, in which case the ancient name would have been de Wrey. However, the Moretonhampstead History Society in its history of the existing "Wray Barton", on the Wray Brook about 1 mile south-east of Moretonhampstead, omits mention of any connection to the Wrey Baronets.

=== North Wyke, South Tawton ===
According to Pole, William Wray held the estate of "Northwike" (in the parish of South Tawton, called "North Week" by Risdon) during the reign of King Henry III (1217–1272) which was retained by his male descendants who changed their surname to Wike during the reign of King Richard II (1377–1399) Risdon however stated the estate of North Week to have been held during the reign of King Henry III by William de Wigorin alias Chamberlain, "whose posterity assumed the name of Week from their dwelling". In 1661 John Wykes (d.1661) of Northwyke settled the estate of Northwyke onto Richard Weekes (1656–1696), son and heir of Richard Weekes (d.1670) of Hatherleigh, descended from the family of Weekes of Honichurch. The arms of de Wray/Wykes were: Ermine, three battleaxes sable, not dissimilar to the arms of the Wrey Baronets. The mediaeval mansion of North Wyke survives in the parish of South Tawton, and in St Andrew's Church, South Tawton, survives the effigy of the armed warrior John Wykes (c.1520–1591) Vivian (1895) gives the pedigree of Wykes of Northwyke, in which the descent is as follows:

- William Wray of Northwyke, alive in 1242.
- Walter de Wray of Northwyke (son), living in 1277
- Roger de Wray of Northwyke (son)
- Walter de Wray of Northwyke (son)
- Roger de Wray of Northwyke (son), living in 1345. His eldest son was John Wyke, Sheriff of Devon in 1402, and his second son and heir was William Wyke of Northwyke, who during the reign of King Richard II (1377–1399) abandoned the surname Wray in favour of Wyke.

=== North Russell, Sourton ===
The estate of North Russell was given by Pole as North Trussell. The River Thrushell rises near Bridestow, and runs near Sourton, both within the historic hundred of Lifton. North Russell Farm today is situated on the north bank of the River Thrushell, about 6 miles south-west of Okehampton. Betham (1771) traced the ancestry as follows:

- Robert le Wrey, living in 1136, who married Sibyl Abbot, daughter of Ralph Abbot
- William le Wrey (son), who married Alice Kelley, daughter of John Kelley of Brodewood
- Elias I le Wrey (son)
- Elias II le Wrey (son), who married Joane Holwaye, daughter and heiress of Nicholas Holwaye
- Richard le Wrey, who married Joane Morris, sister and heiress of John Morris
- Stephen le Wrey (son)
- Thomas le Wrey (son), who married Elizabeth Yeo, daughter of Robert Yeo
- Walter le Wrey (son) who married Constance Shylston, daughter of John Shylston
- William Wrey (son) of North Russel
- Walter Wrey (son)
- Robert Wrey (son) of North Russel
- Walter Wrey (son) of North Russel, who married Bridget Shylston, daughter of Robert Shylston
- John Wrey, Esquire, who married Blanch Killigrew, daughter and heiress of Henry Killigrew

== Career ==
John Wrey was High Sheriff of Cornwall in 1585.

== Marriage and progeny ==
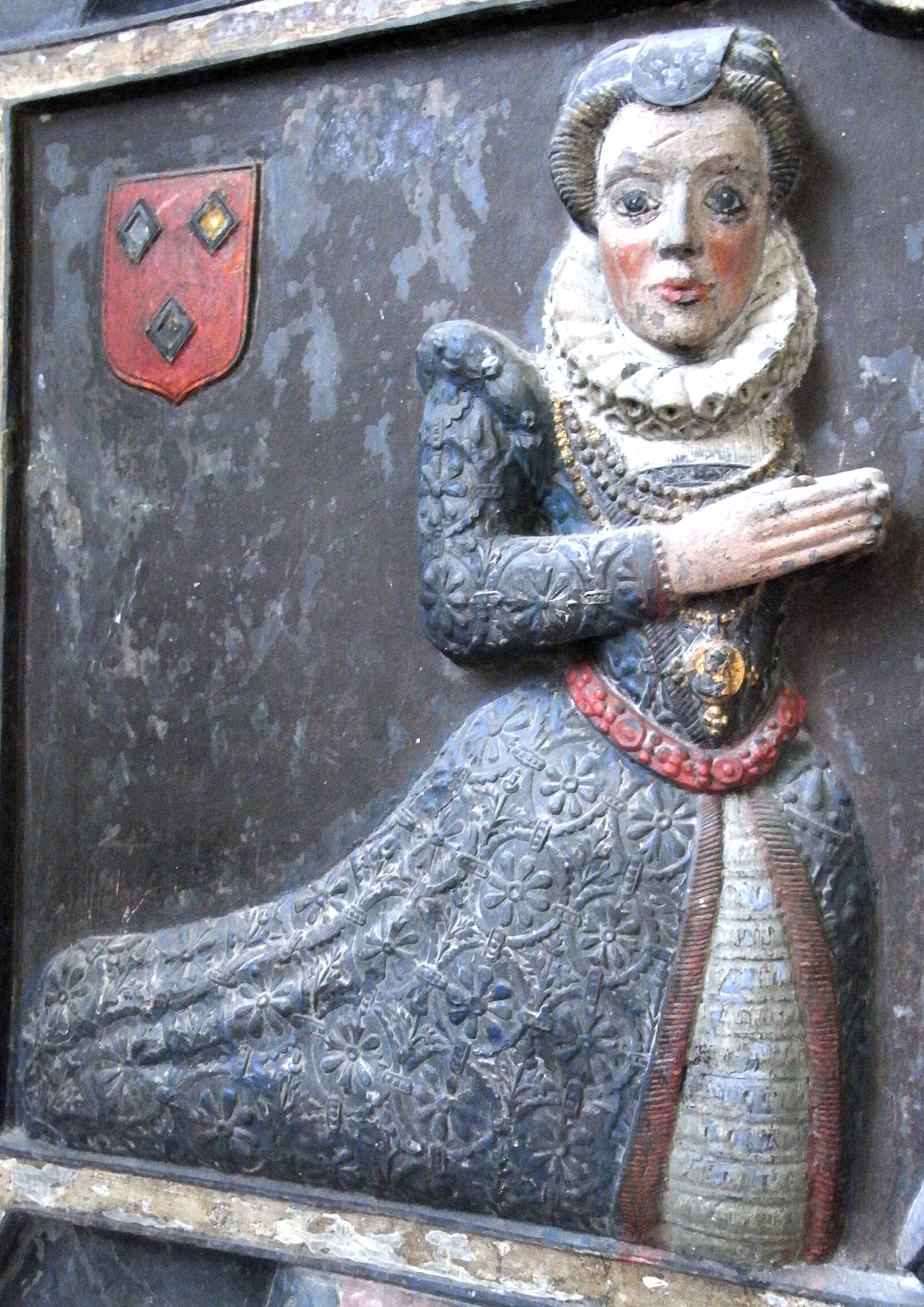
Effigy of Blanche Killigrew (d.1595) on her husband's monument in Tawstock Church, with arms of Killigrew ("ancient"): Gules, three mascles or

John Wrey married Blanch Killigrew (d.1595), daughter and heiress of Henry Killigrew, Esquire, of Woolstone, in the parish of Poundstock, near St Ive, in Cornwall, by his wife a daughter and co-heiress of the prominent Trelawny family. She was heiress to large possessions, and the lordship of the manor of Trebeigh (anciently Trebitch), in the parish of St Ive, Cornwall, which became thenceforward their capital mansion. By Blanch he had the following progeny, six sons and two daughters, the arms of whose respective spouses are shown on the top tier of the three tiered reredos on the monument to John Wrey in Tawstock Church:

=== Sons ===
- John Wrey, eldest son, who married (as her 3rd husband) Eleanor Smith, daughter and heiress of Bernard Smith (c.1522–1591), Esquire, of Totnes in Devon, MP for Totnes in 1558 and mayor of Totnes 1549–50 and c.1565-6 also was escheator of Devon and Cornwalll 1567-8. She was the widow of Sir John Fulford, of Fulford, in Devon. The arms of Smith of Totnes Barry undé of sixteen argent and azure, on a chief gules three barnacles or are shown on the front of the chest tomb of John Wrey in Tawstock Church, impaled by Wrey. Without issue.

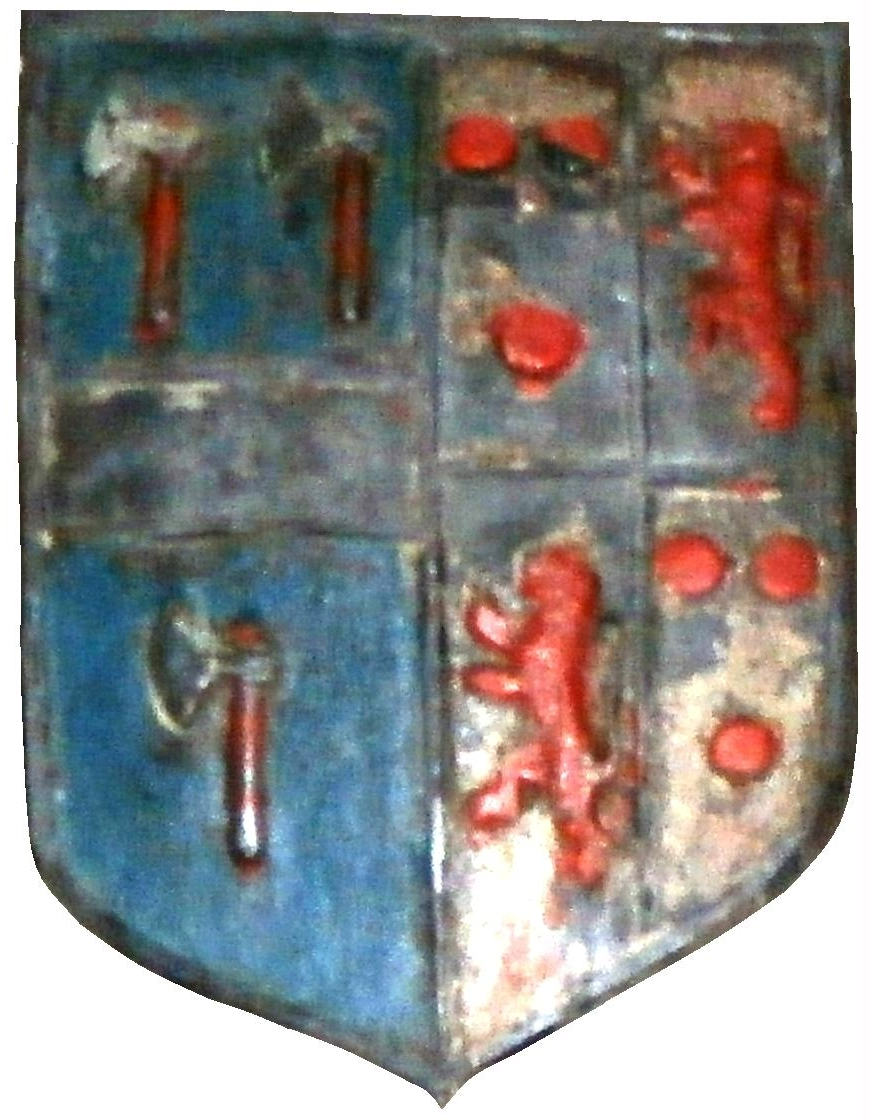
Arms of Sir William Wrey, 1st Baronet impaling Courtenay of Powderham, Detail from monument of his father John Wrey (d.1597) in Tawstock Church

- Sir William Wrey, 1st Baronet (d.1636), 2nd son, who succeeded his father at Trebitch, and was High Sheriff of Cornwall in 1598. He was created a baronet by King Charles I in 1628. He was described by Carew (1602) as a man of hospitality, and a general welcomer of his friends and neighbours. He was knighted at Whitehall on 27 July 1603 before the Coronation of King James I. He married Elizabeth Courtenay, a daughter of Sir William V Courtenay (1553–1630) of Powderham in Devon, by whom he had a son Sir William Wrey, 2nd Baronet (1600–1645) who in about 1624 married Elizabeth Chichester, daughter of Edward Chichester, 1st Viscount Chichester (1568–1648) of Eggesford in Devon. The 2nd Baronet left an only son and heir Sir Chichester Wrey, 3rd Baronet (1628–1668) of Trebitch, MP for Lostwithiel.
- Edmond Wrey, 3rd son, who married Katherine Prye, 2nd daughter of Roger Prye of Horwell in the parish of Colebrooke, Devon. Katherine's eldest brother Richard Prye married Edward's niece Diana Coryton, daughter of his sister Jane Wrey and her husband Peter Coryton.
- Arthur Wrey, who married Joyce Harris, daughter and heir of Tristram Harris of Hayne
- Robert Wrey, who died without issue.
- George Wrey, died without issue.

=== Daughters ===
- Philippa Wrey, wife of George Upton of Puslinch, Yealmpton, Devon.
- Jane Wrey, wife of Peter Coryton, Esquire, of Coryton, in Lifton Hundred, Devon and West Newton Ferrers, St Mellion, Cornwall. The family of Coryton was said by Risdon to be of "great antiquity" and later built Pentillie Castle on their manor near St Mellion. Jane's son was William Coryton (1580 – 1651) of West Newton Ferrers, MP for Cornwall in 1624, 1626 and 1628, for Liskeard in 1625, for Grampound in 1640 and for Launceston 1640–41. Her grandson was Sir John Coryton, 1st Baronet (1621–1680). Peter Coryton had been forbidden by his father Richard Coryton (d.1564) to marry Jane Wrey, on pain of being disinherited. Shortly before the necessary legal document had been drawn up, Richard was murdered by two of his own servants, it is suspected on orders from his son Peter. Following his father's death Peter married Jane Wrey and inherited his father's estates, valued at £2,000 per annum. At the execution of one of the murderers at Launceston was present Edmond Wrey, Jane's brother, "seene att the place of execution with a black box under his arme in the sight of the malefactor who was cast over wth speed wth out any confession". The murder is related in a petition dated about 1644 to the King by John Coryton of Probus, Cornwall, Peter's great-nephew, and it features in one of the tales by Sabine Baring-Gould (d.1924) in his Cornish Characters and Strange Events (1909), pp. 388–398.

== Monument at Tawstock ==
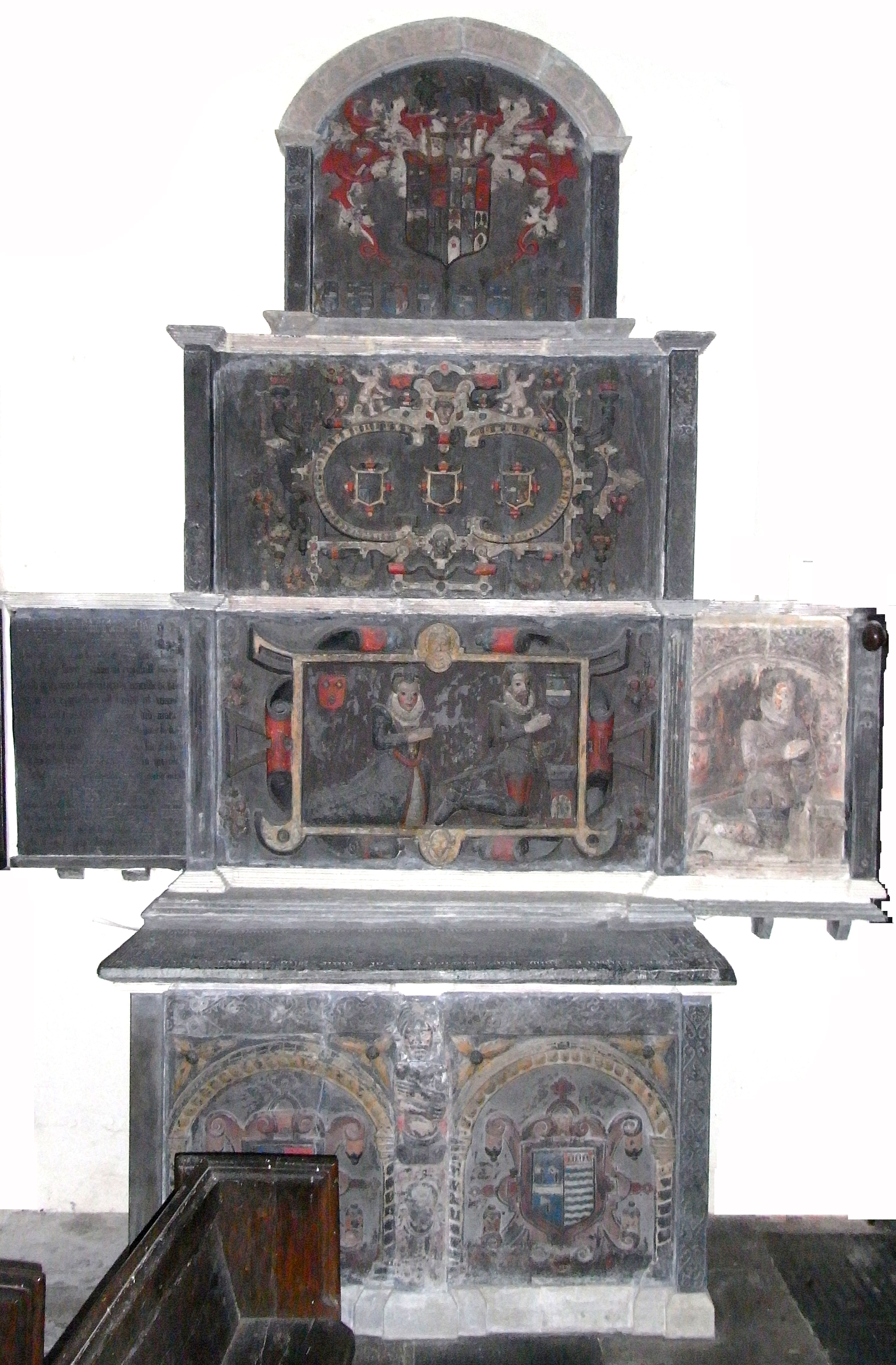
Monument to John Wrey (d.1597), Tawstock Church

The large monument to John Wrey and his wife Blanche Killigrew exists in St Peter's Church, Tawstock, against the east wall of the north transept. It takes the form of a gothic altar tomb with three-tiered altarpiece or reredos behind, the lowest tier of which resembles a triptych. It was moved from St Ive Church in Cornwall in 1924 by Sir Philip Bourchier Sherard Wrey, 12th Baronet (1858–1936), of Tawstock Court. It consists of a large slate chest tomb with a large slate back-plate behind and above, on which are shown in relief kneeling figures of Wrey and his wife. The monument displays much heraldry. The large slate slab on top of the chest tomb is inscribed within a ledger line thus:

Ye body of John Wrey Esquier who was buried ye 9th of June Ano Domini 1597 Heere lieth the body of Blannch Wrey who was buried ye 16 of December 1595

On the left panel of the triptych is inscribed the following verse:

Loe here he lieth though dead yet living still,
His famous name resounding echo saye,
Whereby report of hym the ayre doth fyll
The lastinge fame & name of rightful Wreye,
Good to ye poore bribes never woulde he take,
Voyde of oppression all kind of waye,
He faithful frynds of enemyes did make,
Of quarels greate ceast lawe ech daye by daye.
Death doe they worst this Wreye yet lives & shall,
Thy darte his deeds cannot extyrpe or quayle.
Thousands are they which thou hast causde to fall,
And yet on hym no waye thou canst prevayle.
What resteth then but cease to mourne & moane
For hym whose vertues shine like to the sonne.
Though here he lieth his Sowle to Heave is gone,

Where Angells see hym though his threads be spoone.

== Sources ==
- Betham, William, Baronetage of England, Vol.1, 1771, pp.300–303, Wrey Baronets
- Wotton, Thomas, Baronetage of England, 1771
- Pole, Sir William (d.1635), Collections Towards a Description of the County of Devon, Sir John-William de la Pole (ed.), London, 1791
- Vivian, Lt.Col. J.L. & Drake H.H. (Eds.), The Visitation of the County of Cornwall in the year 1620, London, Harleian Society, 1st series, volume 9, 1874, p. 268, pedigree of Wrey
- Vivian, Lt.Col. J.L., The Visitations of Cornwall: Comprising the Heralds' Visitations of 1530, 1573 & 1620; with Additions by J.L. Vivian, Exeter, 1887, pp.564–566, pedigree of "Wrey of Trebeigh"
