= Sir William Wrey, 1st Baronet =

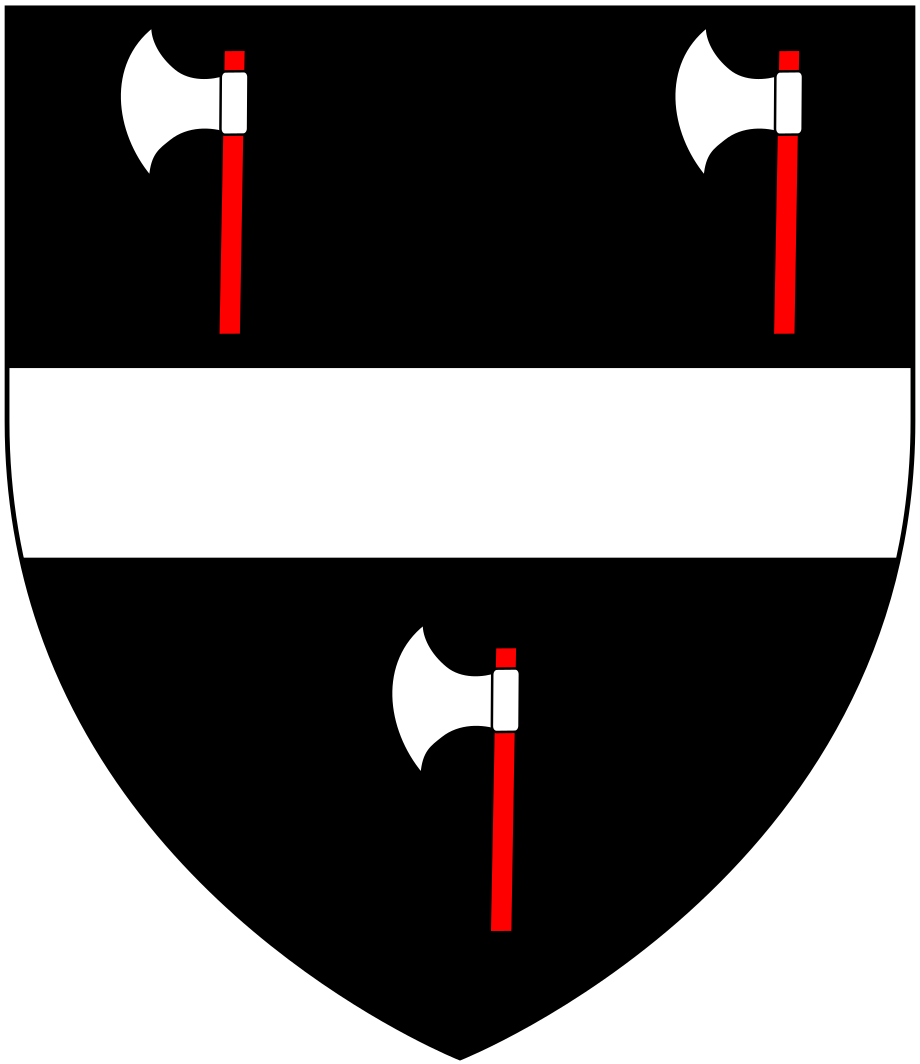
Arms of Wrey of Trebeigh, Cornwall and Tawstock, Devon: Sable, a fesse between three pole-axes argent helved gules

Sir William Wrey, 1st Baronet (died 1636) of Trebeigh, St Ive, Cornwall and North Russell, Sourton, Devon, was High Sheriff of Cornwall in 1598 and was created a baronet by King Charles I in 1628.

== Origins ==
He was the second son of John Wrey (d.1597) by his wife Blanch Killigrew (d.1595), heiress of Trebeigh, daughter and heiress of Henry Killigrew, Esquire, of Woolstone, in the parish of Poundstock, near St Ive, in Cornwall.

== Inheritance ==
William succeeded his childless elder brother John II Wrey, who had married (as her 3rd husband) Eleanor Smith, daughter and heiress of Bernard Smith (c.1522-1591), Esquire, of Totnes in Devon, MP for Totnes in 1558 and mayor of Totnes 1549-50 and c.1565-6 also was escheator of Devon and Cornwall 1567-8.

== Career ==
William was High Sheriff of Cornwall in 1598. and was knighted at Whitehall on 27 July 1603 before the Coronation of King James I. He played a leading figure in the local government of Cornwall. He served as a Deputy Lieutenant and a Commissioner of Oyer and Terminer. He served in the honorary post of Recorder of Liskeard from about 1615 to his death. He was created a baronet by King Charles I in 1628. He was described by Carew (1602) as a man of hospitality, and a general welcomer of his friends and neighbours.

== Lands held ==
He added to his patrimony inherited from his brother, much of which formed his mother's Killigrew inheritance, and at his death he owned over 6,000 acres including four manors in Cornwall and a share in four others.

== Marriage and children ==
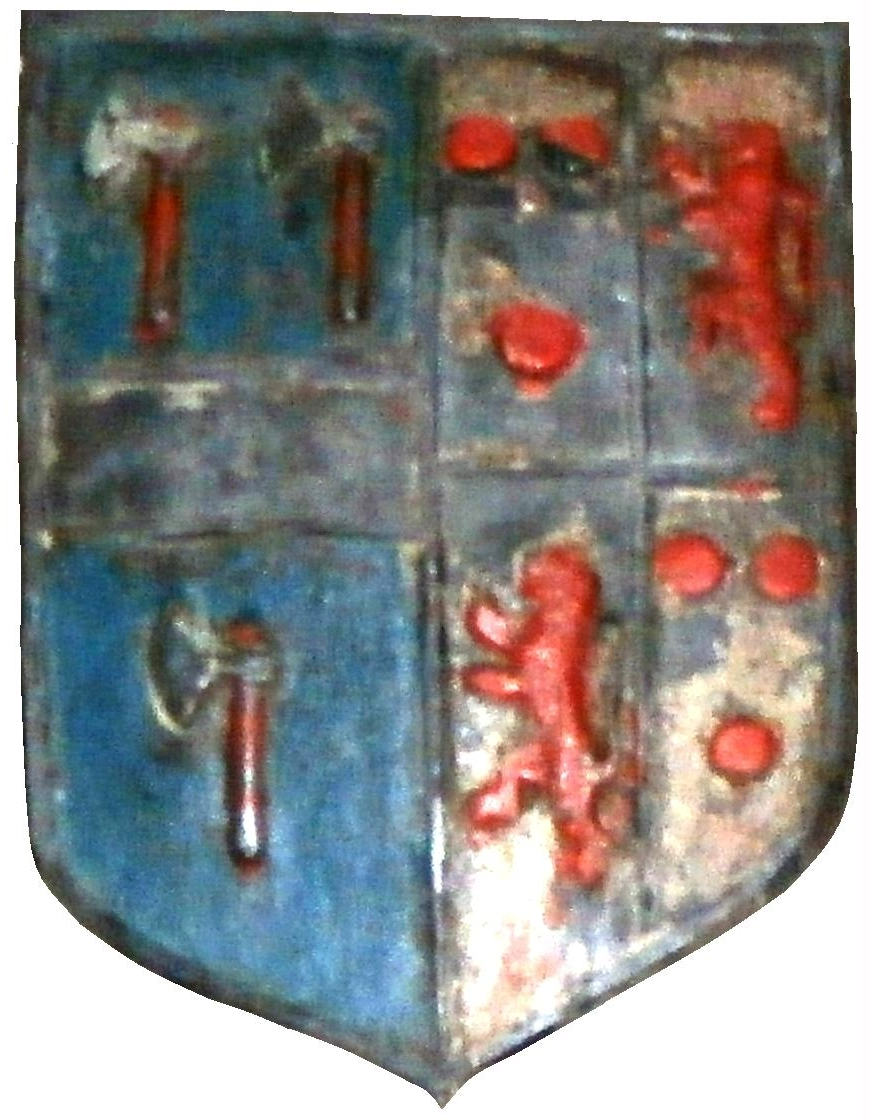
Arms of Sir William Wrey, 1st Baronet impaling Courtenay of Powderham, detail from monument to his father John Wrey (d.1597) in Tawstock Church, Devon, formerly in St Ive Church, Cornwall

He married (as his 2nd wife)Elizabeth Courtenay, a daughter of Sir William V Courtenay (1553–1630) of Powderham in Devon (by his wife Elizabeth Manners, daughter of Henry Manners, 2nd Earl of Rutland (1526–1563)) by whom he had an only son and heir:

- Sir William Wrey, 2nd Baronet (1600–1645) who in about 1624 married Elizabeth Chichester, daughter of Edward Chichester, 1st Viscount Chichester (1568–1648) of Eggesford in Devon. He served as MP for Liskeard in 1624. The 2nd Baronet left an only son and heir Sir Chichester Wrey, 3rd Baronet (1628–1668) of Trebitch, MP for Lostwithiel.

== See also ==
- Wrey Baronets

== Sources ==
- Betham, William, Baronetage of England, Vol.1, 1771, pp.300-303, Wrey Baronets
- Wotton, Thomas, Baronetage of England, 1771
- Pole, Sir William (d.1635), Collections Towards a Description of the County of Devon, Sir John-William de la Pole (ed.), London, 1791
- Hunneyball, Paul, biography of Wrey, William (c.1601-1645), of Trebigh, St. Ive, Cornwall, published in The History of Parliament: the House of Commons 1604-1629, ed. Andrew Thrush and John P. Ferris, 2010
- Vivian, Lt.Col. J.L. & Drake, H.H., (Eds.) The Visitation of the County of Cornwall in the year 1620, Harleian Society, 1st series, Volume 9, London, 1874, p. 268, pedigree of Wrey
- Vivian, Lt.Col. J.L., The Visitations of Cornwall: Comprising the Heralds' Visitations of 1530, 1573 & 1620; with Additions by J.L. Vivian, Exeter, 1887, pp.564-566, pedigree of "Wrey of Trebeigh"

Baronetage of England
New creation	Baronet (of Trebitch); 1628–1636	Succeeded by William Wrey
