= William Coryton =

English politician (1580–1651)

Arms of Coryton: Argent, a saltire sable

William Coryton (1580–1651) of West Newton Ferrers, St Mellion, Cornwall, was a Cornish gentleman who served as MP for Cornwall in 1624, 1626 and 1628, for Liskeard in 1625, for Grampound in 1640 and for Launceston 1640–41. He was expelled from Parliament for falsifying returns.

== Origins ==
Coryton was the eldest son of Peter Coryton of Coryton, in Lifton Hundred, Devon and West Newton Ferrers, St Mellion, Cornwall, by his wife Joan Wrey, a daughter of John Wrey (d. 1597) of North Russell, Sourton, Devon and of Trebeigh, St Ive, Cornwall, and sister of Sir William Wrey, 1st Baronet (d. 1636).

== Career ==
Coryton was appointed Vice-Warden of the Stannaries in 1603 and High Sheriff of Cornwall for 1613. In 1624 he was elected Member of Parliament for Cornwall. He was elected MP for Liskeard in 1625 and again MP for Cornwall in 1626.

In 1620 he was appointed vice-warden of the Stannaries. In July 1627 Coryton was arrested for refusing to subscribe the forced loan of that year, and imprisoned in the Fleet Prison, where he remained until March 1628. His place of Vice-Warden of the Stannaries was in the meantime given to John Mohun. In view of the opening of parliament in 1628, he was released and was re-elected MP for Cornwall. He spoke in the debate on religious grievances on 27 January 1629, in that on tonnage and poundage which followed, and in other debates. His tone was described as "studiously moderate."

Coryton was present on 2 March 1629 when the Speaker, Sir John Finch, was forcibly held in his seat. After his fellow MP Sir John Eliot had read a remonstrance on tonnage and poundage, the Speaker had refused to put it to the house, and had risen to dissolve the assembly. Finch was then held in his seat by Denzil Holles and Benjamin Valentine while resolutions against Arminianism and illegal exactions were read and declared carried. Coryton was subsequently charged with having aided and abetted Eliot, Holles, and the rest, and even with having assaulted Francis Winterton, member for Dunwich, Suffolk. He was summoned with the other "conspirators" before the Star Chamber, and appeared, but refused to plead on the ground of privilege of parliament. He was accordingly committed a close prisoner to the Tower of London. An application for a habeas corpus made on his behalf in the following May was refused. He made submission, however, was released, and reinstated in his office in the Stannary Courts at some date prior to 16 January 1630. His administration of justice in the Stannary Courts gave much dissatisfaction to suitors, and in or about 1637 he was arrested on a charge of false imprisonment. The matter, however, was not pressed, and on his release he resumed his judicial duties.

In April 1640 Coryton was elected MP for Grampound for the Short Parliament in an apparent double return, and was re-elected MP for Grampound for the Long Parliament in November 1640. He was at the time Mayor of Bossiney and was found guilty on petition of falsifying the returns for the election at the Parliamentary constituency of the same name. He was also found guilty of maladministration in the Stannary Courts and was "not admitted to sit" in Parliament. At the same time he was removed from the office of Vice-Warden of the Stannaries, and also from the Stewardship of the Duchy of Cornwall and Deputy-Lieutenancy of the County of Cornwall which he then held.

== Marriage and children ==
Coryton married Elizabeth Chichester (died 26 January 1656 – 1657), 3rd daughter of Sir John Chichester (d. 1586) of Raleigh, Devon, Sheriff of Devon in 1585. By his wife Elizabeth, who survived him, Coryton had four sons and seven daughters, including:

- Sir John Coryton, 1st Baronet (1621–1680), eldest son and heir, created a baronet on 27 February 1662 (see Coryton baronets).

== Death and burial ==
Coryton died on 1 May 1651 and was buried in the church of St Mellion, near Plymouth. The tomb was sculpted by Thomas Gaffin almost two centuries later in 1836.

A rhyming inscription on his tomb describes him as

Both good and great, and yet beloved;
In judgment just, in trusts approved.

== Sources ==
- Duffin, Anne & Hunneyball, Paul, biography of Coryton (Currington), William (1579-1651), of West Newton Ferrers, St. Mellion, Cornwall, published in The History of Parliament: the House of Commons 1604-1629, ed. Andrew Thrush and John P. Ferris, 2010

Parliament of England
| Preceded by Bevil Grenville; John Arundell | Member of Parliament for Cornwall; 1624; With: Bevil Grenville | Succeeded by Sir Robert Killigrew; Charles Trevanion |
| Preceded by William Wrey; Nicholas Hele | Member of Parliament for Liskeard; 1625; With: Nicholas Hele | Succeeded by Sir Francis Steward; Joseph Jane |
| Preceded by Sir Robert Killigrew; Charles Trevanion | Member of Parliament for Cornwall; 1626–1629; With: Sir Francis Godolphin 1626; Sir John Eliot | Parliament suspended until 1640 |
| Parliament suspended since 1629 | Member of Parliament for Grampound; 1640; With: John Trevanion; Warwick Mohun; James Campbell | Succeeded by Sir John Trevor; James Campbell |
| Preceded by Bevil Grenville; Ambrose Manaton | Member of Parliament for Launceston; 1640–1641; With: Ambrose Manaton | Succeeded by John Harris; Ambrose Manaton |
