= Sir Bourchier Wrey, 4th Baronet =

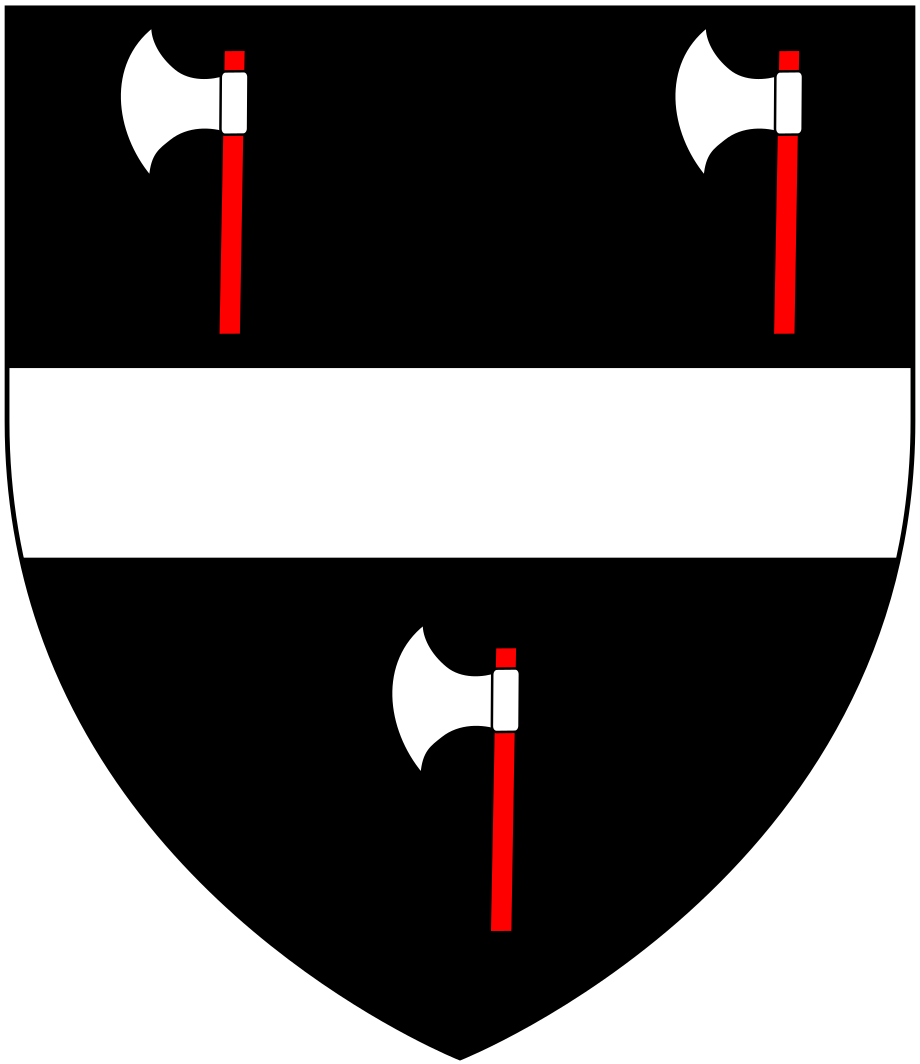
Arms of Wrey of Trebeigh, Cornwall and Tawstock, Devon: Sable, a fesse between three pole-axes argent helved gules

Sir Bourchier Wrey, 4th Baronet (1653–1696) of Tawstock Court in North Devon, was a Member of Parliament and a noted duellist. He commanded a regiment of horse after the Restoration of the Monarchy in 1660, serving under James Scott, 1st Duke of Monmouth.

== Origins ==
He was the eldest son and heir of Sir Chichester Wrey, 3rd Baronet (1628–1668), of Trebeigh in the parish of St Ive, Cornwall and of North Russell in the parish of Sourton, Devon, by his wife Lady Anne Bourchier, a daughter and coheiress of Edward Bourchier, 4th Earl of Bath (d.1636) of Tawstock Court in North Devon, and widow of Lionel Cranfield, 1st Earl of Middlesex. The Wreys had been seated for several generations at the manor of Trebigh, but by the marriage of Sir Chichester with Lady Anne Bourchier they inherited the manor of Tawstock, thenceforth the family seat (in which parish the present baronet still lives in 2015), and several other estates.

== Political career ==
He served as Member of Parliament for Liskeard in Cornwall from 1678 to 1679, was elected for the county seat of Devon 1685, and sat for Liskeard again from 1689 to 1696.

== Duels ==
In Hyde Park, Westminster, on 4 February 1691–92 he fought a duel with Thomas Bulkeley (d. 1708), MP for Beaumaris, in which of the six men engaged as principals and seconds five were MPs, as noted by Luttrell. Two of the seconds were slightly wounded.

In May 1694 at Falmouth in Cornwall, he fought another duel with James Praed (d. 1706) of Trevethowe, MP for St. Ives and "was run through the body, Mr. Praed being only hurt slightly in the face". Although on 1 June 1694 he was reported as having died from his wounds, he lived on until 21 July 1696. He was buried in Tawstock Church.

== Marriage and children ==
He married Florence Rolle, daughter of Sir John Rolle (d.1706) of Stevenstone, Devon, a great landowner.

== See also ==
- Wrey baronets

== Sources ==
- Vivian, Lt.Col. J.L., The Visitations of Cornwall: Comprising the Heralds' Visitations of 1530, 1573 & 1620; with Additions by J.L. Vivian, Exeter, 1887, pp.564-566, pedigree of "Wrey of Trebeigh"

Baronetage of England
Preceded by Chichester Wrey	Baronet (of Trebitch); 1668–1696	Succeeded by Bourchier Wrey
