= William Wrey =

William Wrey may refer to:

- Sir William Wrey, 1st Baronet, High Sheriff of Cornwall in 1598
- Sir William Wrey, 2nd Baronet, MP for Liskeard, Cornwall in 1624

== See also ==
- William Wray (disambiguation)
