= Bernard Smith (MP) =

English politician

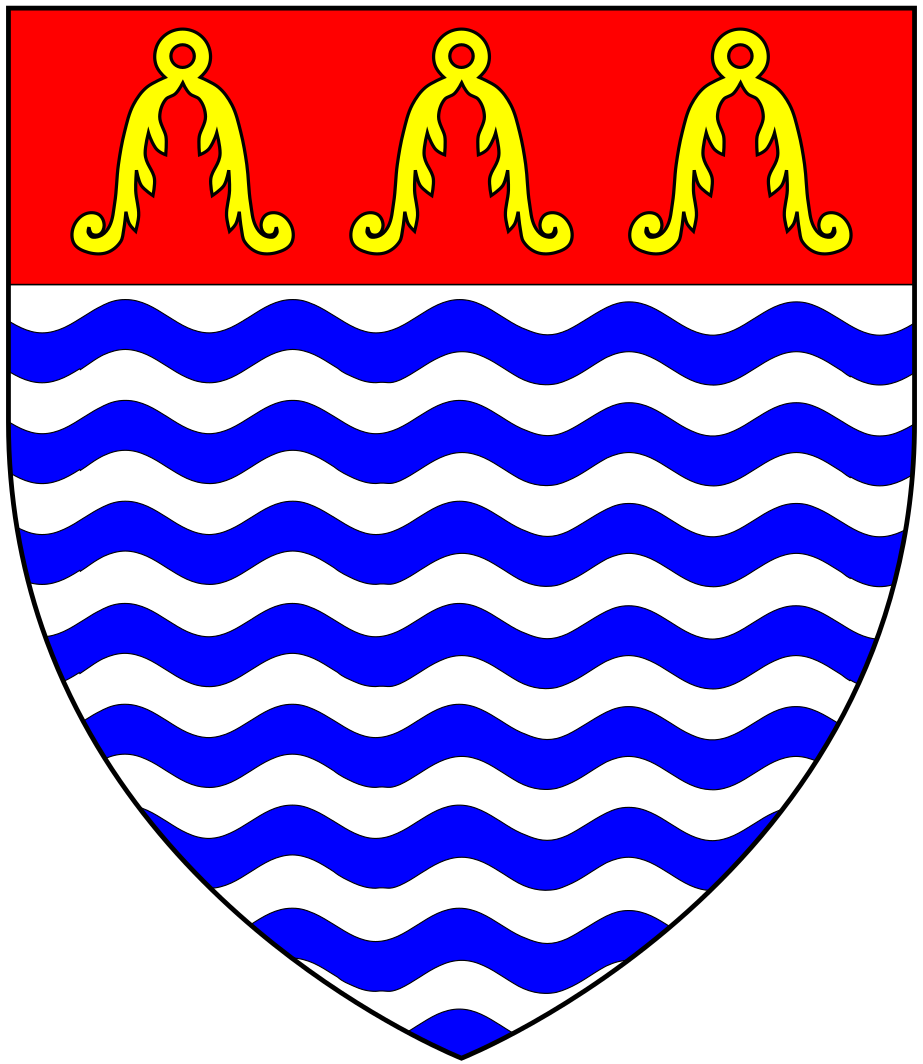
Arms of Smith of Totnes, as seen impaled by Wrey on monument to John I Wrey (died 1597) in Tawstock Church, Devon. Wrey's son John II Wrey was the 3rd husband of Smith's daughter Eleanor Smith: Barry undé of sixteen argent and azure on a chief gules three barnacles or. Pole (d. 1635) gives the arms as: Barry undé of six argent and azure on a chief gules three barnacles or

Bernard Smith (c. 1522 – 1591) of Totnes in Devon was MP for Totnes in 1558. He was mayor of Totnes in 1549–50 and c. 1565–6, and was escheator of Devon and Cornwall in 1567–8.

== Origins ==
He was the son of Walter Smith (d.1555), a merchant of Totnes, whose Easter Sepulchre type monument survives in the south chancel aisle of St Mary's Church, Totnes. At the Dissolution of the Monasteries Walter had purchased Totnes Priory and some of its lands which in 1544 he conveyed to feoffees for the uses of himself and his son Bernard. Bernard's sister Alice Smith was the wife firstly of John Hurst (died 1555) (son of William Hurst (died 1568), merchant of Exeter, thrice MP for Exeter) and secondly of John II Petre (died 1581) of Exeter and Bowhay, MP for Exeter in 1554 and governor of the Exeter Merchant Adventurers.

== Career ==
One of the earliest surviving recorded events of his career was his seizure in 1545 of a Spanish ship and its cargo which resulted in his censure by the Privy Council and an order for him to restore both to their owner. In several ventures he was a business partner of Christoper Savery MP and his brother Richard Savery MP, whom he later accused in the Star Chamber of assault and theft.

== Lands held ==
He purchased further lands near to those formerly belonging to Totnes Priory inherited from his father, and was subjected to a lawsuit due to his having cut-off the water supply to the mills of Totnes Castle.

== Marriage and progeny ==
The name of Bernard Smith's wife, whom he had married by 1547, is not known, but by her he left a daughter and sole heiress:

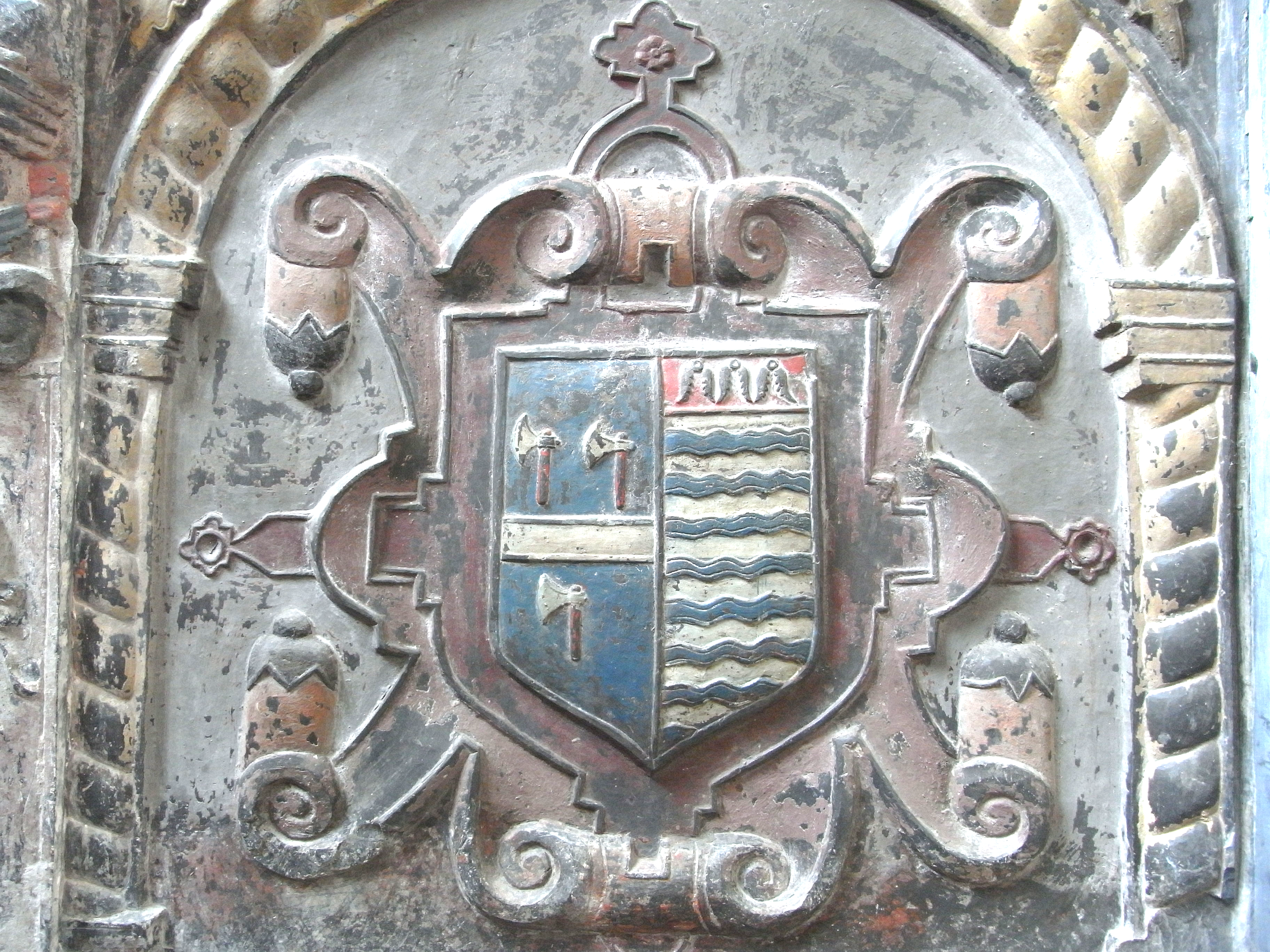
Arms of Wrey (Sable, a fesse between three pole-axes argent helved gules) impaling Smith of Totnes; detail from monument, now in Tawstock church, of John II Wrey (d.pre 1596), 3rd husband of Eleanor Smith

- Eleanor Smith, a substantial heiress who married four times, but produced no issue:
  - Firstly to John Charles (1543–68) of Tavistock, whose great-great-grandfather John Charles of Morton Hampstead in Devon had married Margery Foorde, daughter and heiress of Richard Foorde long seated at the estate of Foorde in the parish of Moretonhampstead, which estate had been given to his ancestor Ely (or Elias) Foorde by William de Mandeville, 3rd Earl of Essex (died 1189). Without issue.
  - Secondly on 30 January 1569/70 at Totnes Eleanor married, as his 2nd wife, Sir John Fulford (1524-1580) of Great Fulford, Dunsford, Devon, Sheriff of Devon in 1557 and 1576. Without issue.
  - Thirdly Eleanor married John II Wrey (d.pre 1596) of North Russell in Devon and Trebeigh, St Ive, in Cornwall, eldest son of John I Wrey (d.1597), Sheriff of Cornwall in 1587, and brother of Sir William Wrey, 1st Baronet (d.1636). The large chest tomb monument to John Wrey I showing kneeling effigies of him and his wife Blanche Killigrew (d.1595), heiress of Trebeigh, survives in the north transept of St Peter's Church in Tawstock, Devon, a later seat of the Wrey family, having been removed in 1924 from St Ive Church in Cornwall. The arms of Smith of Totnes Barry undé of sixteen argent and azure, on a chief gules three barnacles or are shown on the front of the chest tomb impaled by Wrey. Without issue.
  - Fourthly in 1596 Eleanor married Ambrose Bellot (c. 1561–1637) of Bochym, Cornwall and of "Downton", Devon MP for East Looe, Cornwall, in 1597.

== Death and succession ==
Bernard Smith died in Totnes on 16 July 1591. He was succeeded by his daughter and sole heiress Eleanor Smith, then the wife of John Wrey. His will has not survived.

== Sources ==
- Hawkyard, A.D.K., biography of Bernard Smith published in History of Parliament: the House of Commons 1509-1558, ed. S.T. Bindoff, 1982
