= Chichester Wrey =

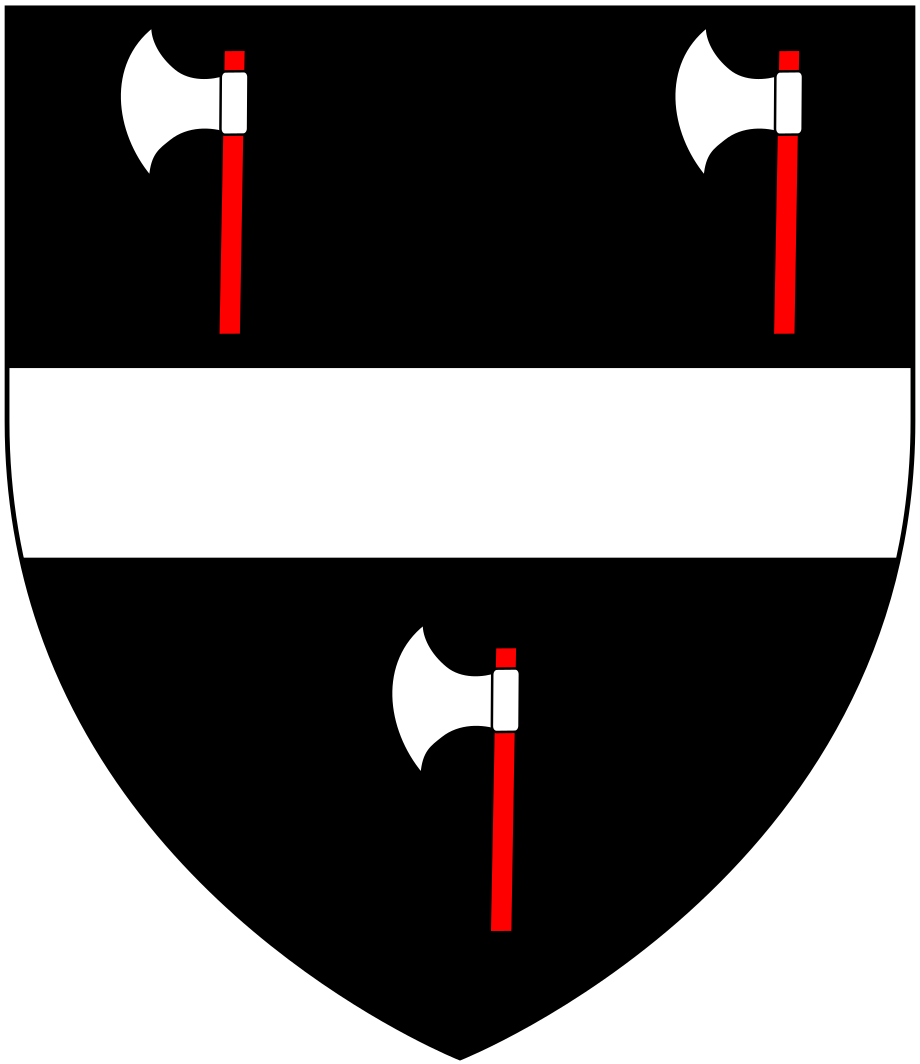
Arms of Wrey of Trebeigh, Cornwall and Tawstock, Devon: Sable, a fesse between three pole-axes argent helved gules

Sir Chichester Wrey, 3rd Baronet (1628–1668) of Trebeigh in the parish of St Ive, Cornwall and of North Russell in the parish of Sourton, Devon, was an active Royalist during the Civil War and was Colonel of the Duke of York's Regiment and served as Governor of Sheerness.

== Origins ==
He was the eldest son and heir of Sir William Wrey, 2nd Baronet (1600–1645) of Trebeigh in the parish of St Ive, Cornwall and of North Russell in the parish of Sourton, Devon, a Member of Parliament for Liskeard, Cornwall, in 1624. At the start of the Civil War the 2nd Baronet was a Royalist and in 1642 was appointed a Commissioner of Array in Cornwall, responsible for raising local militia troops for the King's army. His mother was the 2nd Baronet's wife Elizabeth Chichester, daughter of Edward Chichester, 1st Viscount Chichester (1568–1648) of Eggesford in Devon.

== Career ==
During the Civil War, like his father, he was an active Royalist and fought for the King's cause with much bravery, and was knighted by King Charles I at Bristol Castle on 3 August 1643. He succeeded to the baronetcy on his father's death in 1645, during the Civil War. He was Colonel of the Duke of York's Regiment and served as Governor of Sheerness.

After the Restoration of the Monarchy he was elected to the Cavalier Parliament in 1661 as a member for Lostwithiel in Cornwall, sitting until his death in 1668.

== Marriage and children ==
Canting arms of Bourchier: Argent, a cross engrailed gules between four water bougets sable, subsequently quartered by Wrey, as survives on several Wrey monuments in Tawstock Church, frequently also with the Bourchier knot

He married Lady Anne Bourchier, the third daughter and eventual co-heiress of Edward Bourchier, 4th Earl of Bath (died 1636) of Tawstock Court in North Devon, and widow of James Cranfield, 2nd Earl of Middlesex. The Wreys had been seated for several generations at the manor of Trebigh, but by the marriage of Sir Chichester Wrey with Lady Anne Bourchier, and following the death without children of Henry Bourchier, 5th Earl of Bath (1593–1654), they inherited the manor of Tawstock, thenceforth the family seat (in which parish the present baronet still lives in 2015), and several other estates. By his wife he had children as follows:

- Sir Bourchier Wrey, 4th Baronet (1653–1696), eldest son and heir, of Tawstock Court, a Member of Parliament and a noted duellist. He commanded a regiment of horse after the Restoration of the Monarchy in 1660, serving under James Scott, 1st Duke of Monmouth.
- Col. Chichester Wrey (died 1706), second son, who died in Spain.
- Edward Wrey, third son.
- John Wrey, fourth son, a soldier "killed before Tangier", at some time before its evacuation by the English garrison in 1684.
- Anne Wrey, who married Sir Francis Northcote, 3rd Baronet (1659–1709).

== Sources ==
- Vivian, Lt.Col. J.L., The Visitations of Cornwall: Comprising the Heralds' Visitations of 1530, 1573 & 1620; with Additions by J.L. Vivian, Exeter, 1887, pp.564-566, pedigree of "Wrey of Trebeigh"

Baronetage of England
Preceded by William Wrey	Baronet (of Trebitch); 1645–1668	Succeeded by Bourchier Wrey
