= Coryton House =

Coryton House may refer to:

- Coryton House, Cardiff, a historic house in Coryton, Cardiff, Wales
- Coryton House, Devon, a historic house in Coryton, Devon, England
