= Sir William Wrey, 2nd Baronet =

MP for Liskeard, Cornwall in 1624

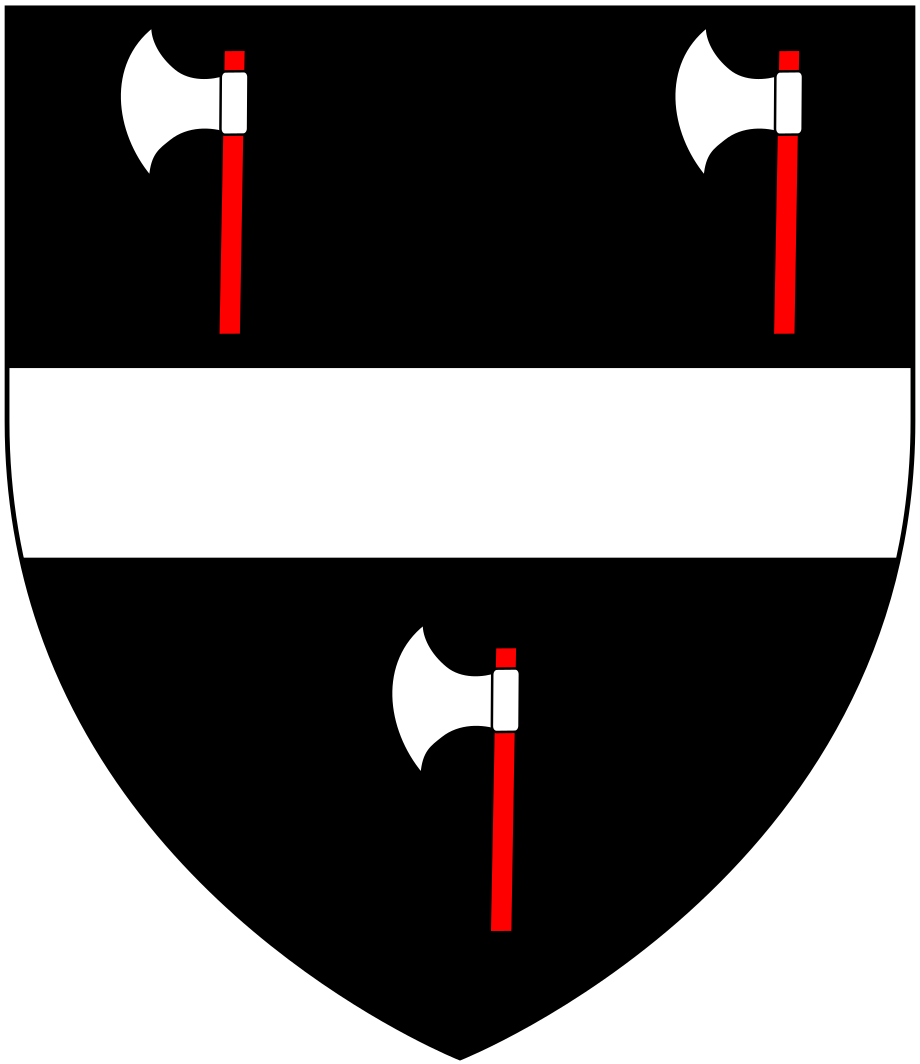
Arms of Wrey of Trebeigh, Cornwall and Tawstock, Devon: Sable, a fesse between three pole-axes argent helved gules

Sir William Wrey, 2nd Baronet (1600 – August, 1645) of Trebeigh, St Ive, Cornwall and North Russell, Sourton, Devon, was MP for Liskeard, Cornwall in 1624.

== Origins ==
He was the only son of Sir William Wrey, 1st Baronet (d.1636) of Trebeigh, St Ive, Cornwall and North Russell, Sourton, High Sheriff of Cornwall in 1598, by his wife Elizabeth Courtenay, a daughter of Sir William V Courtenay (1553–1630) of Powderham in Devon (by his wife Elizabeth Manners, daughter of Henry Manners, 2nd Earl of Rutland (1526-1563)).

== Inheritance ==
He inherited on his father's death an estate of over 6,000 acres including four manors in Cornwall and a share in four others.

== Career ==
William Wrey was MP for Liskeard, Cornwall, in 1624. He was knighted before March 1634 and in 1636 he succeeded his father as 2nd Baronet. At the start of the Civil War he was a Royalist and in 1642 was appointed a Commissioner of Array in Cornwall, responsible for raising local militia troops for the King's army. His son Chichester Wrey was also an active Royalist, and fought for the King's cause with much bravery.

== Marriage and children ==
In about 1624 he married Elizabeth Chichester, daughter of Edward Chichester, 1st Viscount Chichester (1568-1648) of Eggesford in Devon, who brought with her a large dowry of £2,000. He left three sons and three daughters including:

- Sir Chichester Wrey, 3rd Baronet (1628-1668), of Trebeigh, eldest son and heir, MP for Lostwithiel in Cornwall.
- Elizabeth, married into the Bluett family of Holcombe Rogus, Devon
- Daughter, name unknown, married into the Erisey family of Cornwall
- Daughter, name unknown, married into the family of Nichols

== Death ==
Wrey died in August 1645.

== See also ==
- Wrey Baronets

== Sources ==
- Betham, William, Baronetage of England, Vol.1, 1771, pp.300-303, Wrey Baronets
- Hunneyball, Paul, biography of Wrey, William (c.1601-1645), of Trebigh, St. Ive, Cornwall, published in The History of Parliament: the House of Commons 1604-1629, ed. Andrew Thrush and John P. Ferris, 2010
- Vivian, Lt.Col. J.L. & Drake, H.H., (Eds.) The Visitation of the County of Cornwall in the year 1620, Harleian Society, 1st series, Volume 9, London, 1874, p. 268, pedigree of Wrey
- Vivian, Lt.Col. J.L., The Visitations of Cornwall: Comprising the Heralds' Visitations of 1530, 1573 & 1620; with Additions by J.L. Vivian, Exeter, 1887, pp.564-566, pedigree of "Wrey of Trebeigh"

Baronetage of England
Preceded by William Wrey	Baronet (of Trebitch); 1636–1645	Succeeded by Chichester Wrey
