= Lily-Mae Fisher =

British Royal Navy Commando

- Born: 23 August 1994; Virginia Water, England
- Died: 3 June 2026 (aged 31); Sourton Down, England
- Cause of death: Helicopter crash
- Education: Reading Blue Coat School; Imperial College, London
- Occupation: Royal Navy officer

Lily-Mae Fisher (23 August 1994 – 3 June 2026) was a British lieutenant in the Royal Navy who had represented England at junior lacrosse and pole vault, and Great Britain at triathlon. At the time of her death in a helicopter crash, she was Britain’s only serving woman Royal Navy commando in the Commando Helicopter Force.

== Early life ==
Fisher was born in Virginia Water, Surrey. She went to school at Reading Blue Coat School. She then studied for a masters degree in Geology at Imperial College, London. She graduated in 2016, and then worked for BP for two years. While at university, she joined the Officer Training Corps and began to learn to fly with the University of London Air Squadron. Fisher was a contestant on the television dating show Take Me Out in 2014, and on the assault course game show Ninja Warrior UK in 2018.

== Military career ==
Fisher took a commission with the Royal Navy in 2019, where she completed her elementary flying training, and completed the All Arms Commando Course to become the only woman serving as a Royal Navy commando. She joined 846 Naval Air Squadron in 2025, where she was completing her flying training in Merlin Mk4 helicopters.

== Sporting achievements ==
While at school, Fisher represented England at junior lacrosse and pole vault. In 2021, she represented Great Britain at the European age group triathlon championships in Valencia, and in 2026 she had been invited to train with the GB Snowsport Telemark squad.

== Death ==
Fisher and two colleagues from the Royal Navy died on 3 June 2026 during routine training, when their helicopter crashed into a field near Sourton Down, Devon. She was 31.
