= Edward Chichester, 1st Viscount Chichester =

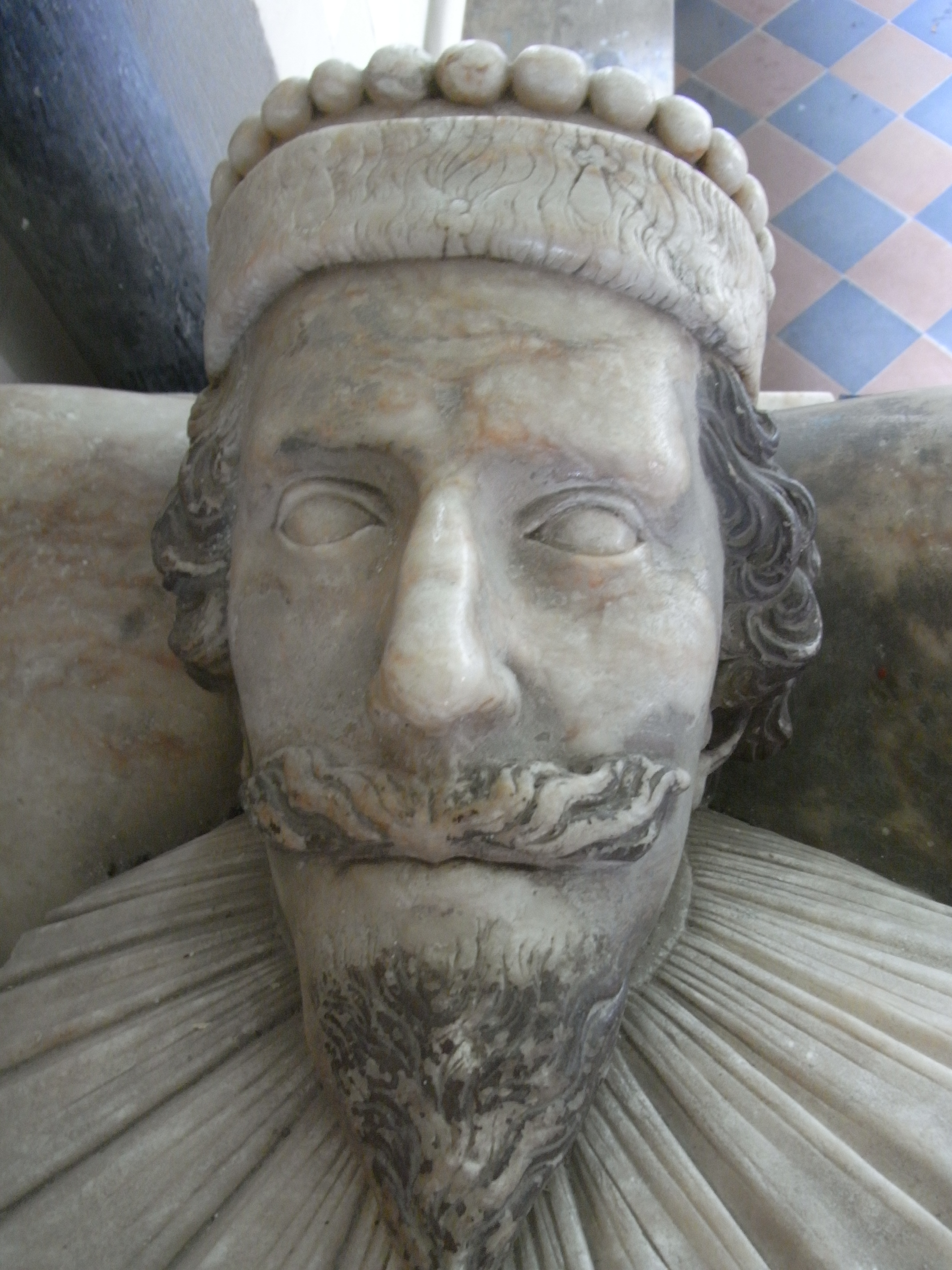
Edward Chichester (died 1648), Effigy in Eggesford Church, Devon. He wears the Coronet of a viscount

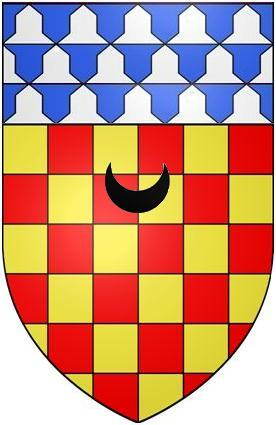
Arms of Chichester of Eggesford: Chequy or and gules, a chief vair a crescent sable for difference

Edward Chichester, 1st Viscount Chichester (1568 – 8 July 1648), was an English peer.

== Origins ==
He was the third son of Sir John Chichester (died 1569), knight, lord of the manor of Raleigh, in the parish of Pilton, Devon, about three-quarters of a mile north-east of the historic centre of Barnstaple, by his wife Gertrude Courtenay (1521–1566), a daughter by his second marriage of Sir William Courtenay (1477–1535) "The Great" of Powderham, MP for Devon 1529–1535, and a distant cousin of the Earl of Devon. He was thus the younger brother of Arthur Chichester, 1st Baron Chichester of Belfast (1563–1625), founder of Belfast.

== Career ==
He was knighted in 1616, and after his brother's death in 1625 was in his memory ennobled as Baron Chichester, of Belfast, and Viscount Chichester, of Carrickfergus, both in the County of Antrim, both in the Peerage of Ireland. He succeeded his brother in his extensive estates as well as in his offices of Governor of Carrickfergus and Lord High Admiral of Lough Neagh. He took his seat in the Irish House of Lords in 1634.

== Marriages and children ==
Edward Chichester married twice:

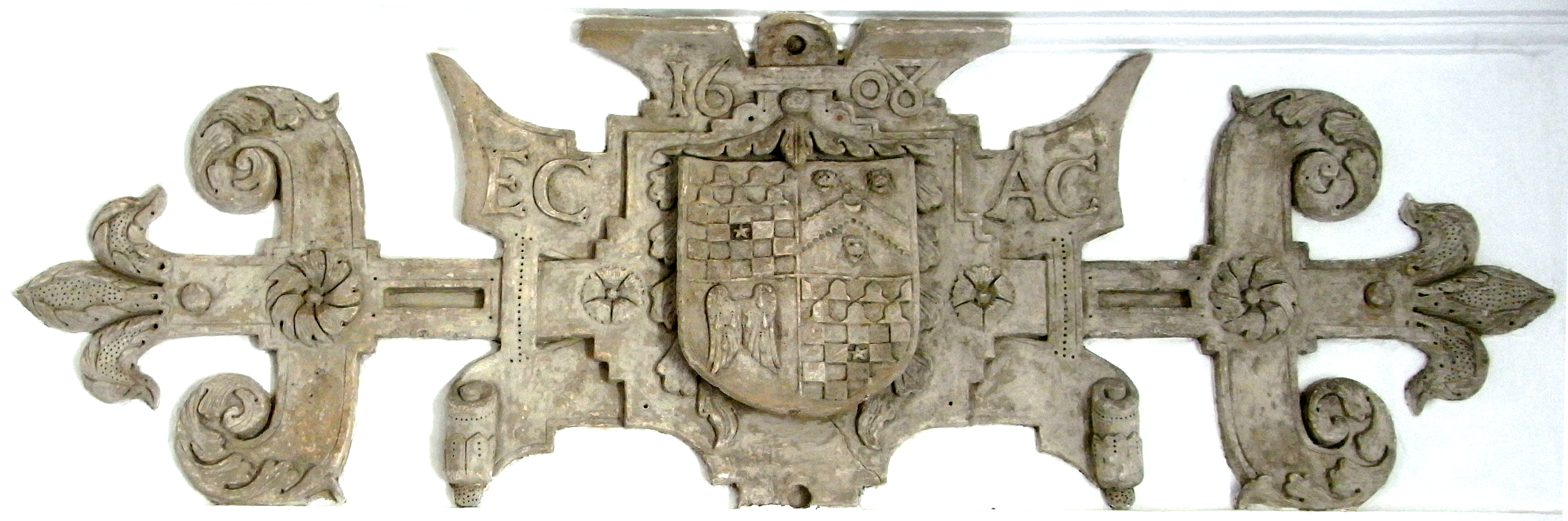
1608 strapwork plaster escutcheon of four quarters in upstairs bedroom of Ruxford Barton, near Crediton, Devon, with initials "EC" and "AC" for Edward Chichester, 1st Viscount Chichester (1568–1648), and his wife Anne Copleston (1588–1616).

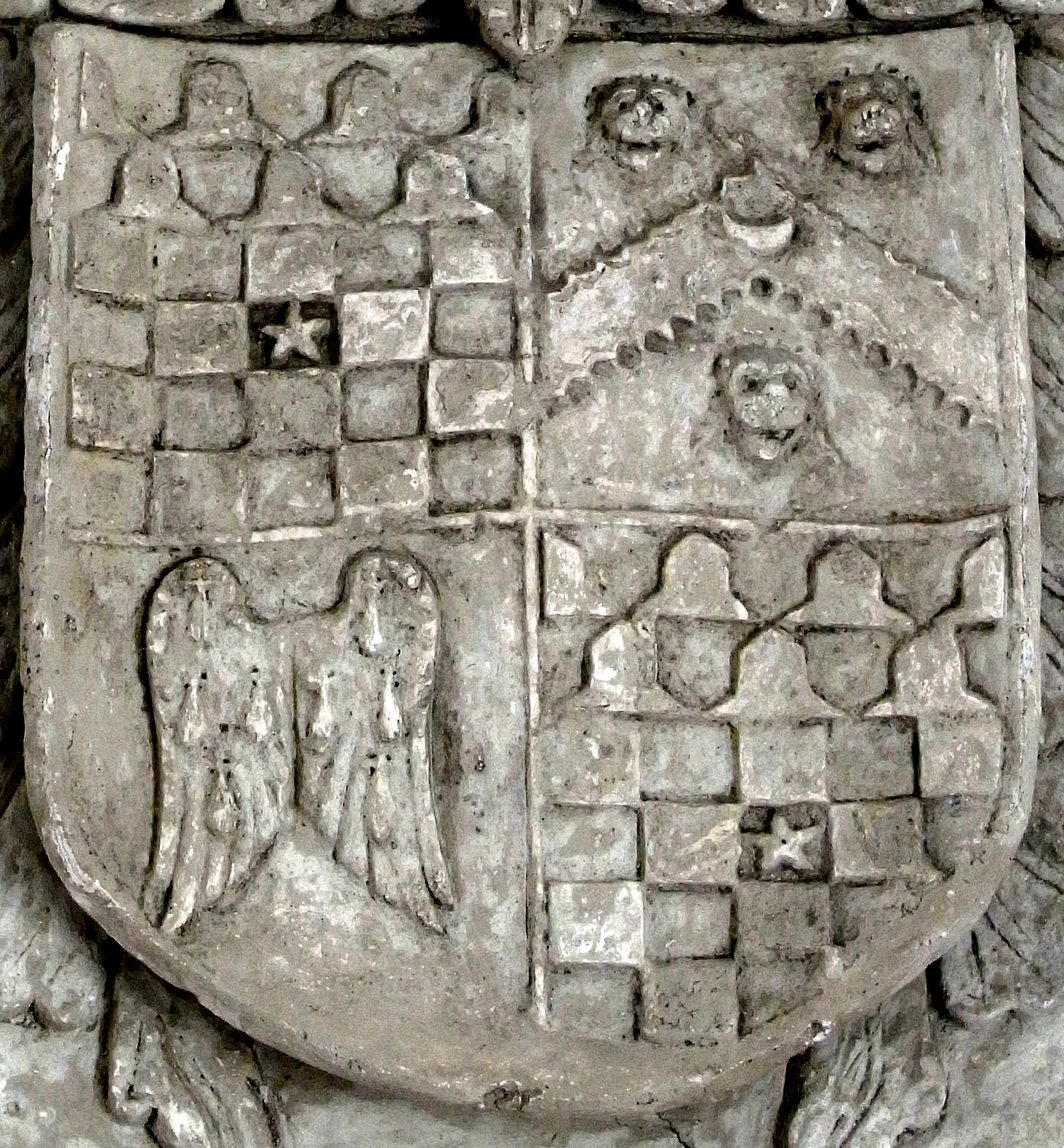
Detail of Chichester escutcheon, Ruxford. Armorials quarters 1&4: Chequy or and gules, a chief vair a mullet for difference (Chichester); 2: Argent, a chevron engrailed gules between three lion's faces azure a crescent for difference (Copleston of Eggesford); 3: Gules, a pair of wings conjoined ermine (de Reigny of Eggesford)

- Firstly in 1605 to Anne Copleston (1588–1616), the sole daughter and heiress of John Copleston Esq., (died 1606) of Eggesford by his wife Dorothy Biston (died 29 July 1601). They had the following children:
  - Arthur Chichester, 1st Earl of Donegall (1606–1674) the eldest son.
  - Col. John Chichester (died 1647), a Royalist during the Civil War, who married Mary Jones, eldest daughter of Roger Jones, 1st Viscount Ranelagh (d. 1643), an Irish peer and Lord President of Connaught.
  - Lt-Col. Edward Chichester (born 1611), a Royalist during the Civil War, who married Elisabeth Fisher, 5th daughter of Sir Edward Fisher, Knight, the latter who in 1611 had obtained letters patent from King James I for extensive lands in Wexford, Ireland, from which he ejected the local population by force of arms and formed into the "Manor of Chichester", and in 1617 renamed Fisherstown, with his seat at "Fisher's Prospect".
  - Elizabeth Chichester, eldest daughter, wife of Sir William Wrey, 2nd Baronet (1600–1645) of Trebeigh, St Ive, Cornwall, and North Russell, Sourton, Devon, MP for Liskeard, Cornwall, in 1624. Her eldest son was Sir Chichester Wrey, 3rd Baronet (1628–1668), of Trebeigh, MP for Lostwithiel in Cornwall. Both the 2nd and 3rd Baronets were Royalists during the Civil War.
  - Mary Chichester, younger daughter, who married firstly Thomas Wise of Sydenham in the parish of Marystow, Devon, and secondly John Harris of Radford.
- Secondly after 1616 and before 1626, as evidenced by a date stone on Eggesford Barton bearing the inscription: "E.C.M. 1626", to Mary Denham.

== Death and burial ==
Lord Chichester died on 8 July 1648 at his manor of Eggesford in Devon, where he was buried.

== Monument ==
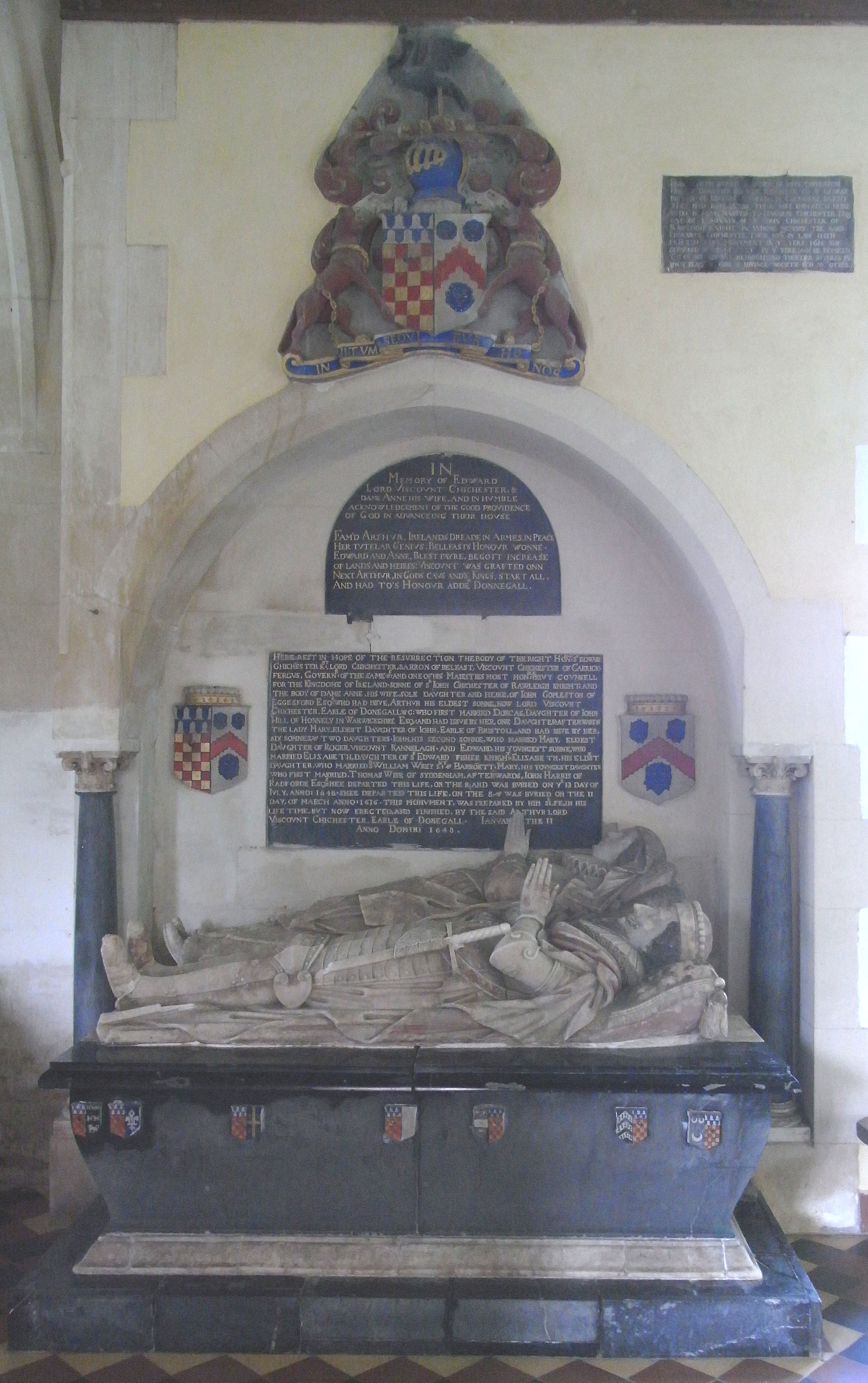
Monument to Edward Chichester (1568–1648), 1st Viscount Chichester, and his wife Anne Copleston (1588–1616), Eggesford Church, Devon. The heraldic achievement above shows an escutcheon of Chichester impaling Copleston, with the supporters of Chichester, two wolves and the Chichester crest of a heron rising with an eel in her beak proper. The Latin motto of Chichester is: Invitum Sequitur Honor, literally translated as "Honour follows against one's will", rendered generally as "Honour is awarded when unsought"

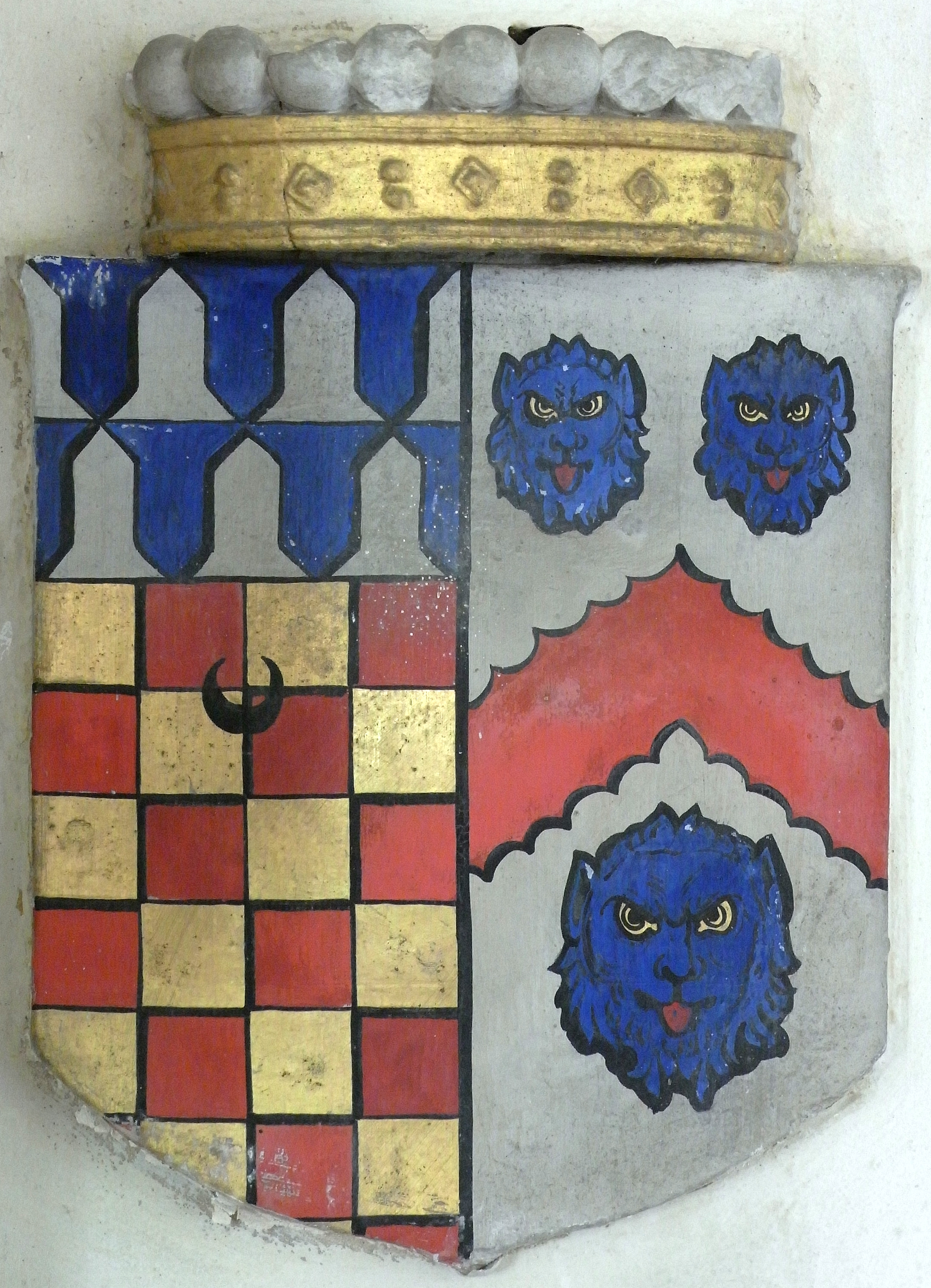
Heraldic escutcheon from monument to Edward, 1st Viscount Chichester (1568–1648), and his wife Anne Copleston (1588–1616), Eggesford Church, Devon. Arms of Chichester impaling Copleston: Baron: Chequy or and gules, a chief vair a crescent sable for difference (Chichester); Feme: Argent, a chevron engrailed gules between three lion's faces azure (Copleston), surmounted by the coronet of a viscount showing 9 of its 16 pearls. The difference of a crescent indicates the arms of a second son

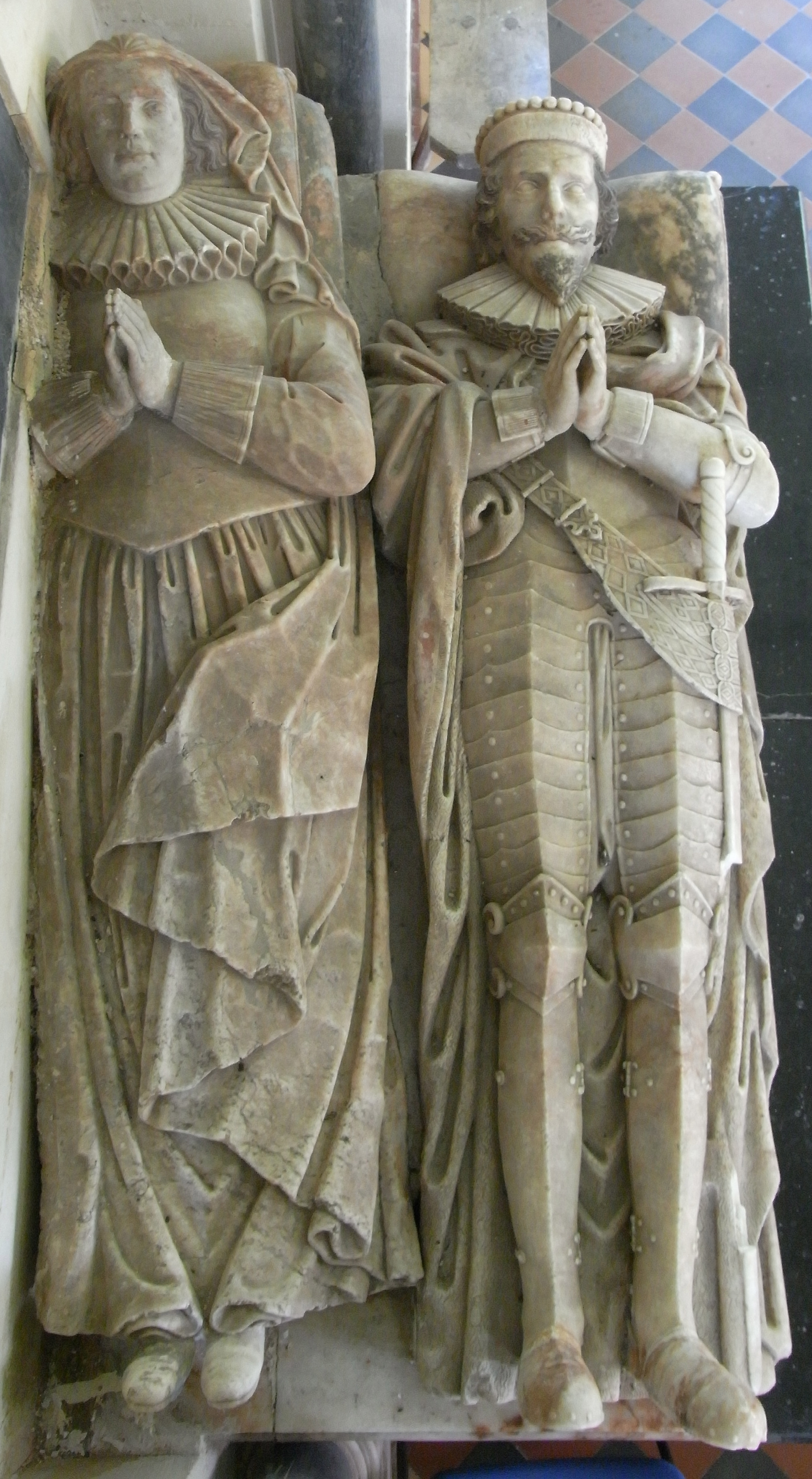
Alabaster effigies of Edward, 1st Viscount Chichester (1568–1648), and his wife Anne Copleston (1588–1616), Eggesford Church, Devon

Lord Chichester has a particularly fine alabaster effigy and monument against the north wall of the north aisle (Chichester Chapel) in Eggesford Church, Devon, to the immediate west of which stood his manor house, Eggesford House, demolished in 1824. The monument shows recumbent effigies of himself and his first wife with two tablets above inscribed as follows:

"Here rest in hope of Resurrection the body of the Right Hon.bl Sr. Edward Chichester knt., Lord Chichester, Barron of Belfast. Viscount Chichester of Carrickfergus, governor of the same &c., and one of His Majesties most hon.ble Privy Counsell for the Kingdome of Ireland, sonne of Sr. John Chichester of Rawleigh knight; and the body of Dame Anne his wife sole daughter and heire of John Copleston of Eggesford Esq.r. who had issue Arthur his eldest sonne now Lord Viscount Chichester, Earle of Donegall &c, who first married Dorcas, daughter of John Hill of Honnely in Warwickshire, Esq. and had issue by her one daughter; afterwards the Lady Mary eldest daughter of John, Earle of Bristol and had issue by her six sonnes & two daughters. John his second sonne who married Mary, eldest daughter of Roger Viscount Rannelagh and Edward his youngest sonne who married Elisabeth daughter of Sr. Edward Fisher knight; Elisabeth his eldest daughter who married Sr. William Wrey knt. & Barro.ett; Mary his youngest daughter who first married Thomas Wise of Syddenham afterwards John Harris of Radforde Esq. Hee departed this life on the 8 and was buried on ye 13-day of July Anno 1648. Shee departed this life on the 8 and was buried on the 11-day of March Anno 1616. This monument was prepared by himself in his lifetime but now erected and finished by the said Arthur Lord Viscount Chichester, Earle of Donegall, January the 11 Anno Domini 1648".

On a lunette above, probably the text planned by the deceased himself:

"In memory of Edward Lord Viscount Chichester & Dame Anne his wife and in humble acknowledgement of the good providence of God in advancing their house".

"Fam'd Arthur Ireland's dreade in armes in peace,
Her tutelar genius Bellfast's honour wonne,
Edward and Anne, blest payre, begott increase,
Of lands and heires: Viscount was grafted onn,
Next Arthur in God's caus and King's stak't all,

And had to's honour added Donnegall".

On the wall to the right above the monument is a black stone tablet inscribed as a memorial to Anne Copleston's parents:

"Here lyeth buried ye bodies of John Copleston Esq., & Dorothie his wife daughter to Sr. George Biston of Biston Castel in Chelshere, knight. They had issue Anne their sole daught. & heire who is now maryed to Edwarde Chichester Esq., one of ye sonnes of Sr. John Chichester of Rawleigh, knight, in whose memory the said Edwarde Chichester their son in law hath erected this monument in ye yere 1614. She departed ye 29 July in ye yere 1601 he departed ye 11 of ... in ye yere 1606, living together 30 yeres in much peace w.th God & lovinge societie e.ch w.th other".

Sir George Beeston (c. 1520 – 1601) of Beeston House near Bunbury, Crewe, Cheshire, acquired Beeston Castle from the Crown shortly before his death. He was a naval captain who commanded the Dreadnought against the Spanish Armada in 1588, and was knighted at sea on board the Ark Royal by Lord Howard of Effingham the Lord High Admiral. He served as MP for Cheshire in 1589. His wife, and Dorothy's mother, was Alice Davenport (died 1591), daughter of Thomas Davenport Esq., of Henbury. Sir George's effigy and elaborate monument exist against the north wall of the sanctuary in St Boniface's Church, Bunbury.

== Sources ==
- Armstrong, R. M. "Chichester, Arthur". Oxford Dictionary of National Biography (online ed.). Oxford University Press. doi:10.1093/ref:odnb/5275. (Subscription, Wikipedia Library access or UK public library membership required.), on the son.
- Axe, Matthew, Chapman, Lesley & Miller, Sharon. The Lost Houses of Eggesford, published by Eggesford Gardens Ltd., Eggesford, 1995.
- Lauder, Rosemary, Devon Families, Tiverton, 2002, Chichester of Hall and Arlington, pp. 35–40.

Peerage of Ireland
New creation	Baron Chichester; 2nd creation 1625–1648	Succeeded by Arthur Chichester
New creation	Viscount Chichester; 1625–1648	Succeeded by Arthur Chichester
