= Wrey baronets =

Title in the Baronetage of England

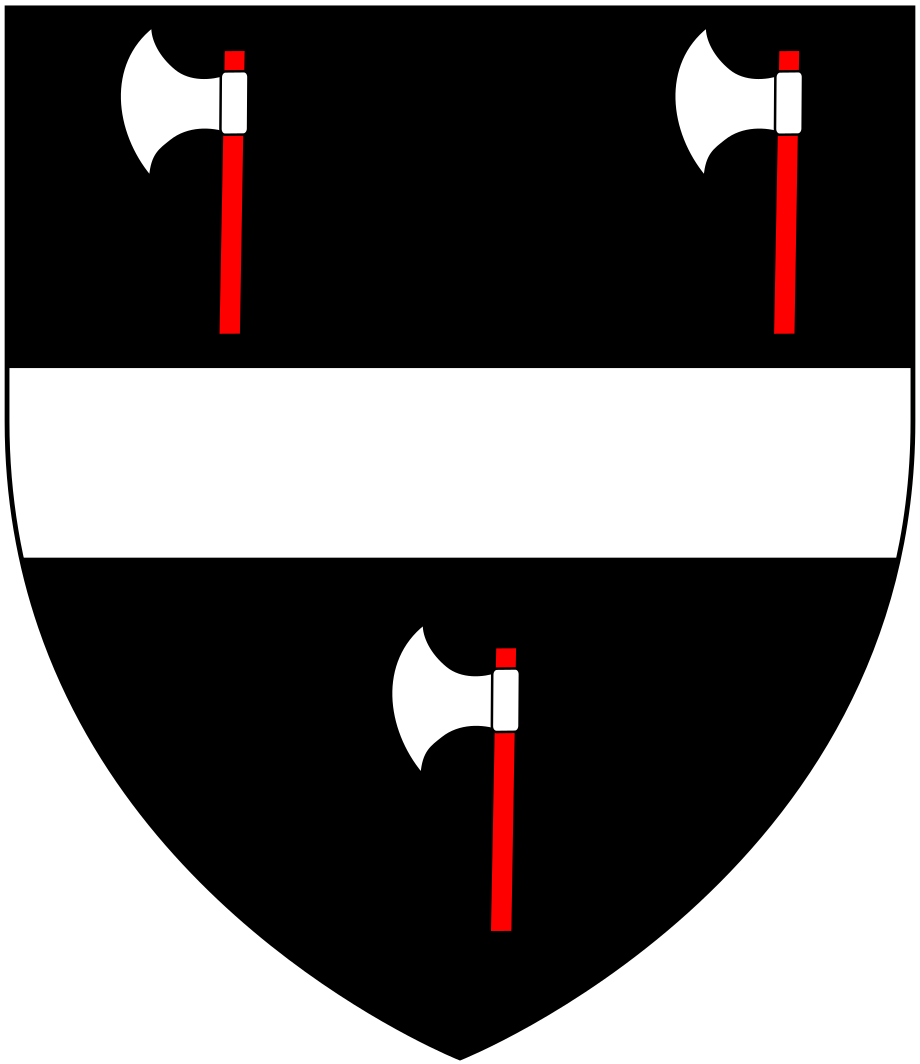
Arms of Wrey of Trebeigh, Cornwall and Tawstock, Devon: Sable, a fesse between three pole-axes argent helved gules

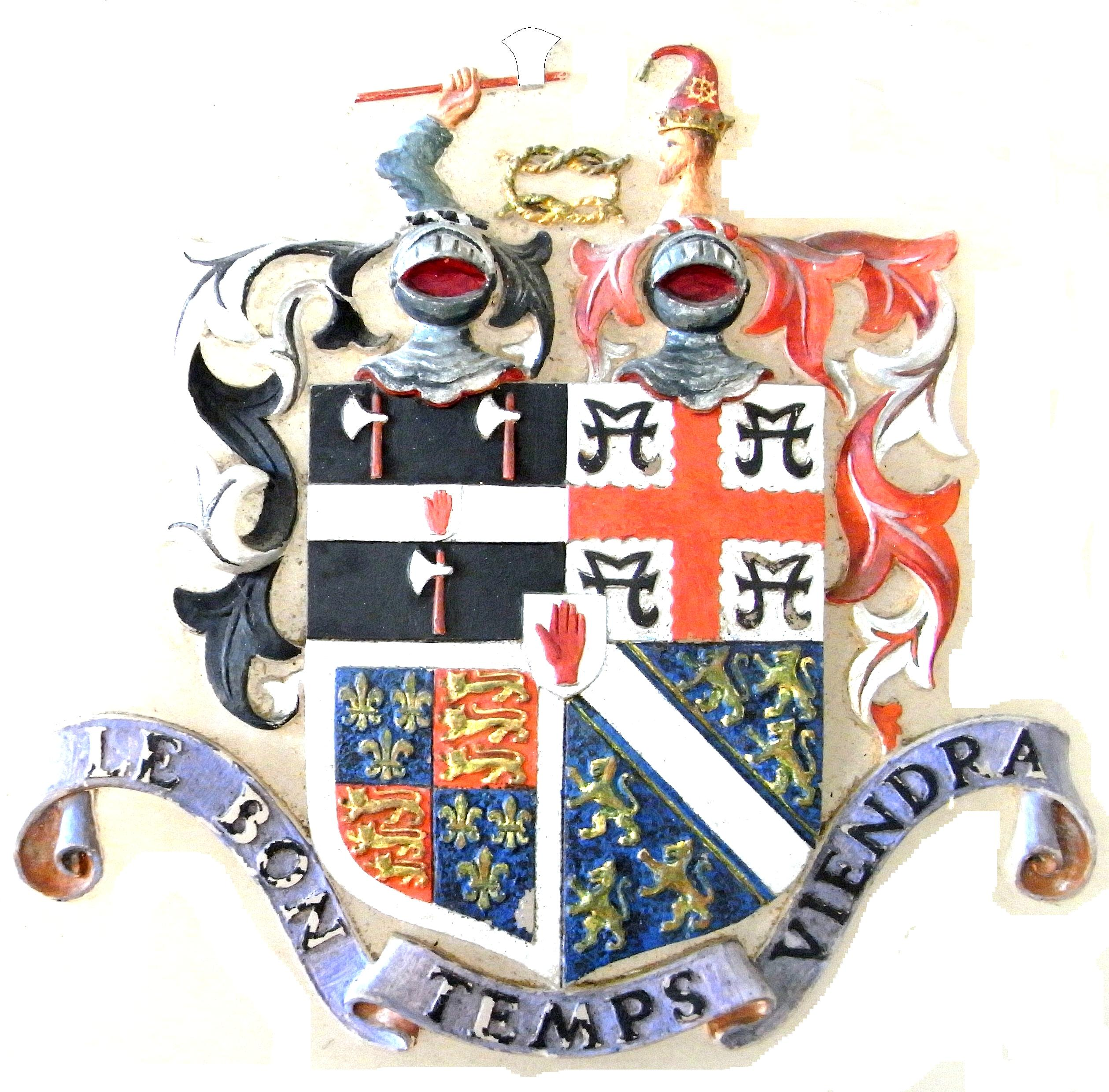
Arms of Wrey Baronets, with quarterings and crests, as seen on mural monument in Tawstock Church, Devon, to Sir Philip Bourchier Sherard Wrey, 12th Baronet: Quarterly: 1st: Sable, a fesse between three pole-axes argent helved gules (Wrey);' 2nd: Argent, a cross engrailed gules between four water-bougets sable (Bourchier); 3rd: Within a bordure argent the Royal Arms of England (Plantagenet); 4th: Azure, a bend argent cotised or between six lions rampant or (de Bohun). The last two quarterings refer to the wife of William Bourchier, 1st Count of Eu (d.1420), namely Anne of Gloucester, Countess of Stafford, the daughter of the Plantagenet prince, Thomas of Woodstock, 1st Duke of Gloucester by his wife Eleanor de Bohun elder daughter and coheiress of Humphrey de Bohun, 7th Earl of Hereford (1341–1373), Earl of Essex and Northampton. Over-all is the Red Hand of Ulster. Above the shield in the centre is a Bourchier knot or. Above the dexter is the crest of Wrey: A cubit arm embowed holding a pole-axe argent helved gules, on the sinister side is the crest of Bourchier: A man's head in profile proper ducally crowned or with a pointed cap gules On a scroll underneath the motto of Bourchier: Le Bon Temps Viendra ("The right time will come")

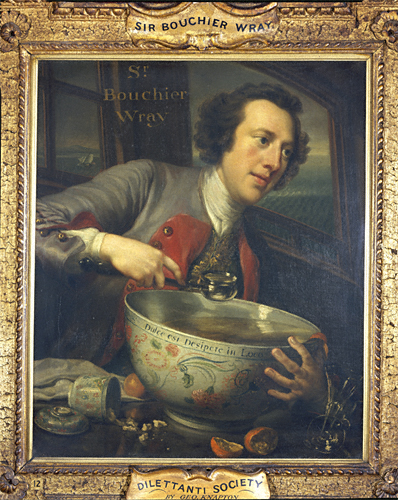
Sir Bourchier Wrey, 6th Baronet (c. 1715–1784), 1744 portrait by George Knapton (1698–1778) for the Society of Dilettanti. Getty Center, Brentwood, Los Angeles

The Wrey Baronetcy, of Trebitch (modern: Trebeigh Manor, St Ive, 4 miles NE of Liskeard) in the Duchy of Cornwall, is a title in the Baronetage of England. It was created on 30 June 1628 for William Wrey (d.1636), 2nd son of John Wrey (died 1597) of Trebeigh, St Ive, Cornwall, a member of an ancient Devon family.

The third Baronet was a supporter of the Royalist cause and sat as Member of Parliament for Lostwithiel after the Restoration. He married Lady Anne, third daughter of Edward Bourchier, 4th Earl of Bath. The fourth Baronet represented Liskeard and Devon in the House of Commons. The fifth Baronet was Member of Parliament for Camelford while the sixth Baronet represented Barnstaple.

== Trebeigh Manor ==
Trebeigh, St Ive, Cornwall was a manor listed in Domesday Book as held by the Earl of Mortain, the largest landholder in that county. He is said to have taken it away wrongfully from the church.

It was given in 1150 by King Stephen to the Knights Templar, and thenceforth formed, together with that order's other nearby manor of Temple on Bodmin Moor, the Preceptory of Trebeigh, which also held the advowson of the parish church of St Ive. Following the suppression of the Knights Templar, the preceptory passed in 1312 to the Knights of Malta. Following the Dissolution of the Monasteries the manor of Trebeigh was granted by Queen Elizabeth I in 1573 to Henry Wilbye and George Blyke, from whom it was acquired by John Wrey, who made it his family's chief seat until his descendants inherited Tawstock in Devon from the Bourchiers in 1654.

== Wrey baronets, of Trebitch (1628) ==
- Sir William Wrey, 1st Baronet (died 1636)
- Sir William Wrey, 2nd Baronet (c. 1600–1645)
- Sir Chichester Wrey, 3rd Baronet (1628–1668)
- Sir Bourchier Wrey, 4th Baronet (c. 1653–1696)
- Sir Bourchier Wrey, 5th Baronet (c. 1683–1726)
- Sir Bourchier Wrey, 6th Baronet (c. 1715–1784)
- Sir Bourchier Wrey, 7th Baronet (1757–1826)
- Sir Bourchier Palk Wrey, 8th Baronet (1788–1879)
- Sir Henry Bourchier Wrey, 9th Baronet (1797–1882)
- Sir Henry Bourchier Toke Wrey, 10th Baronet (1829–1900). He was the son of the 9th Baronet by Ellen Maria Toke, daughter of Nicholas Roundell Toke. He was educated at Trinity College, Oxford, where he graduated in 1851. He was a captain in the 4th (Militia) Battalion Devonshire Regiment, a Justice of the Peace and Deputy Lieutenant for Devonshire, and High Sheriff of Devonshire in 1891. Wrey succeeded his father in 1882. He married in 1854 Hon. Marianne Sherard (died 1895), daughter of the 9th Baron Sherard.
- Sir Robert Bourchier Sherard Wrey, 11th Baronet (1855 – 16 January 1917). (son) He was the son of Sir Henry Bourchier Toke Wrey, 10th Baronet. He served in the Royal Navy, seeing action in the 1882 Anglo-Egyptian War and with the Naval Brigade landed in the Third Anglo-Burmese War. He retired from the service with the rank of captain, and later served as the honorary lieutenant-colonel of the Royal North Devon Hussars. Wrey was married, with one daughter, Rachel Wrey (born 1911). In 1900 he succeeded his father in the baronetcy and the family estates. He was the last to live at Tawstock Court and "to keep house in the old manner" and moved to Corffe a nearby house on the estate, having let the Court. On his own death in 1917 the title passed to his younger brother, Sir Philip Bourchier Sherard Wrey, 12th Baronet (1858–1936), who in 1919 sold 2,500 acres of the estate for £67,000, leaving some 7,000 acres remaining.
- Sir Philip Bourchier Sherard Wrey, 12th Baronet (1858–1936) (brother), left only female progeny.
- Rev. Sir Albany Bourchier Sherard Wrey, 13th Baronet (1861–1948) (brother), died without progeny.
- Sir (Castel Richard) Bourchier Wrey, 14th Baronet (1903–1991) (nephew, son of Edward Castell Wrey, 7th son of 10th Bt.)
- Sir George Richard Bourchier Wrey, 15th Baronet (born 1948)

The heir apparent to the baronetcy is Harry David Bourchier Wrey (born 1984), eldest son of the 15th Baronet.

== See also ==
- Earl of Bath
- Baron Fitzwarine

== Sources ==
- Vivian, Lt. Col. J.L., The Visitations of Cornwall: Comprising the Heralds' Visitations of 1530, 1573 & 1620; with Additions by J.L. Vivian, Exeter, 1887, pp. 564–566, pedigree of "Wrey of Trebeigh"

== Notes ==
Baronetage of England
Preceded by Fenwick baronets	Wrey baronets of Trebitch; 30 June 1628	Succeeded by Trelawny baronets
