= Sir Bourchier Wrey, 5th Baronet =

English Tory politician (c.1683–1726)

Sir Bourchier Wrey, 5th Baronet (c.1683 – November 1726) was an English Tory politician.

== Biography ==
Wrey was the eldest son of Sir Bourchier Wrey, 4th Baronet and Florence Rolle, daughter of Sir John Rolle. He was educated at Eton College before withdrawing and continuing his education with a private tutor. On 28 July 1696 he succeeded to his father's baronetcy and estates while still a minor. The same year, he was left the inheritance of his father's friend, Sir William Williams, 6th Baronet; this resulted in prolonged legal proceedings to secure possession of the Williams estate in Wales. He matriculated at Christ Church, Oxford on 12 July 1700, but did not graduate.

Wrey was returned as a Member of Parliament for Camelford at a by-election in 1712 on the interest of George Granville, 1st Baron Lansdowne. Wrey retained his seat at the 1713 British general election and was recorded in lists of the subsequent Commons as a Tory. In August 1714 he was commissioned as a deputy lieutenant of Cornwall. He stood down from parliament at the 1715 British general election. He contested the 1722 British general election in Barnstaple, but was defeated. Despite his public offices, by 1723 a parliamentary inquiry into the Atterbury Plot named Wrey as an active Jacobite in the west of England. Wrey died in November 1726 and was succeeded in his title by his eldest son and namesake, Bourchier Wrey.

Parliament of Great Britain
Preceded by Bernard Granville; Paul Orchard	Member of Parliament for Camelford with Paul Orchard (1712–1713); James Nicholls (1713–1715); 1712–1715	Succeeded by James Montagu; Richard Coffin
Baronetage of England
Preceded by Bourchier Wrey	Baronet (of Trebitch); 1696–1726	Succeeded by Bourchier Wrey
