= Coryton, Devon =

Hamlet in Devon, England

Coordinates: 50.6302°N 4.1831°W

Coryton
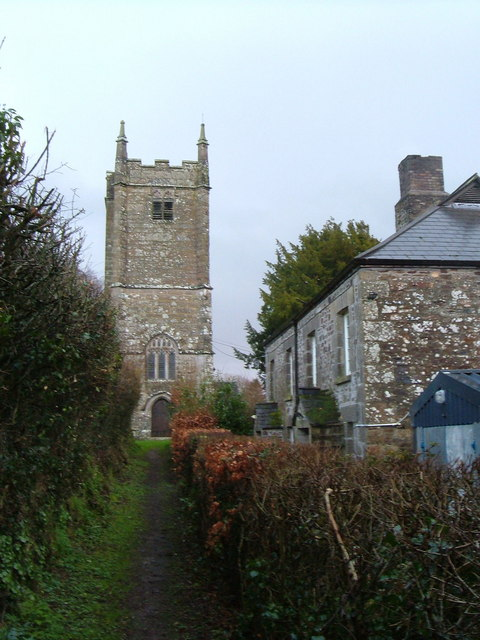
- St Andrew's church, Coryton

- Location within Devon
- OS grid reference: SX456835
- District: West Devon
- Shire county: Devon
- Region: South West
- Country: England
- Sovereign state: United Kingdom
- Post town: OKEHAMPTON
- Postcode district: EX20
- Dialling code: 01822
- Police: Devon and Cornwall
- Fire: Devon and Somerset
- Ambulance: South Western
- UK Parliament: Torridge and West Devon

Coryton is a hamlet and civil parish in the West Devon district of Devon, England, to the north west of Tavistock.

Coryton is in the valley of the River Lyd. It has a church and a former mill. There was formerly a railway station on the Launceston and South Devon Railway (later part of the GWR), closed in 1962.

Coryton House is a former rectory built in 1836. It is a Grade II listed building.

== Notable residents ==
- Sir Kenneth Grange, industrial designer, and his wife lived near Coryton in a barn conversion designed by Grange himself.
