= Tawstock =

Village in Devon, England

Coordinates: 51.05°N 4.05°W

- St Peter's Church, Tawstock

- Location within Devon
- Population: 2,093 (2001)
- OS grid reference: SS5529
- Civil parish: Tawstock
- District: North Devon
- Shire county: Devon
- Region: South West
- Country: England
- Sovereign state: United Kingdom
- Post town: BARNSTAPLE
- Postcode district: EX31
- Dialling code: 01271
- Police: Devon and Cornwall
- Fire: Devon and Somerset
- Ambulance: South Western
- UK Parliament: North Devon

Tawstock is a village, civil parish and former manor in North Devon in the English county of Devon. The parish is surrounded clockwise from the north by the parishes of Barnstaple, Bishop's Tawton, Atherington, Yarnscombe, Horwood, Lovacott and Newton Tracey and Fremington. In 2001 it had a population of 2,093. The estimated population in June 2019 was 2,372.

== Parish Church ==
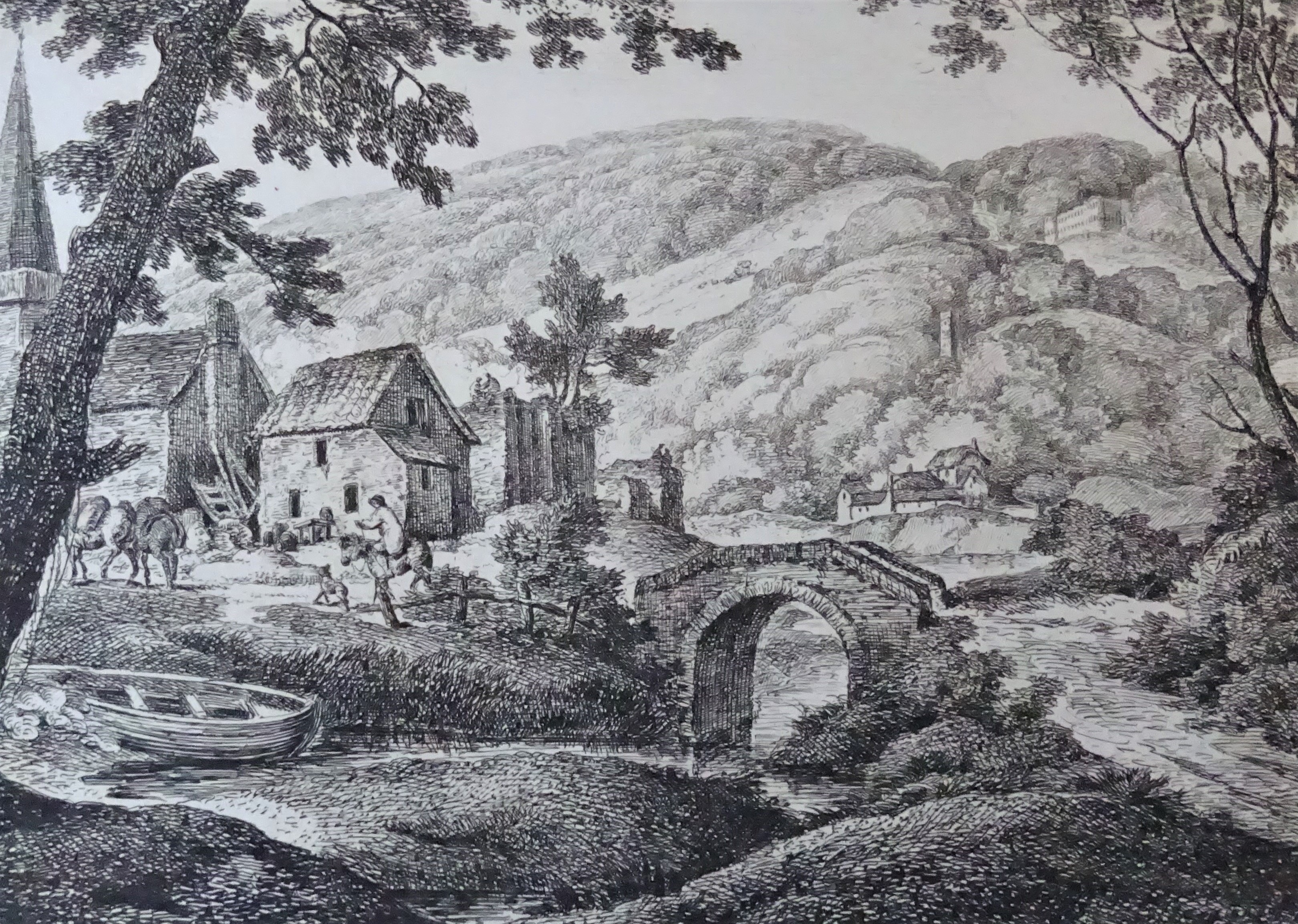
Tawstock Church and village in 1805

A Grade I listed building, St Peter's church is, unusually for Devon, a church largely of the 14th century. A church existed on this location circa the 12th century, but was extensively modified and enlarged. According to the listing summary, "the crossing tower, north and south transepts and aisles were added" in the 14th century; additional modifications were made in the next two centuries before a restoration in 1867-1868.

The plan is cruciform and the site is in the former park of the Earls of Bath. The collection of church monuments is particularly fine: most of the persons commemorated are members of the family of the Earls, connections of theirs, or household officers. Features of interest include the 16th century gallery, the manorial pew of the Earls of Bath (Renaissance in style) and two ceilings of Italian plasterwork.

The tomb of Lady Fitzwarren and the monument of Rachel, Countess of Bath (with figure by Burman) are in the south chancel aisle. The tomb of Sir John Wrey (died 1597) is a large slate-covered tomb-chest with decorated slate back-plate. The tomb was originally at St Ive in Cornwall because a Wray had married a Bourchier in 1652 and it was brought here in 1924.

== Manor of Tawstock ==
The manor of Tawstock was an important one in North Devon, being at times a residence of the feudal barons of Barnstaple. It was held successively by the families of de Totnes, de Braose, de Tracy, FitzMartin, Audley, FitzWarin, Hankford, Bourchier and Wrey. The present Wrey baronet still lives within the former manor and retains ownership of much of the land within the parish, but no longer owns Tawstock Court, the manor house.

=== Tawstock Court ===
Tawstock Court east front and St Peter's Church, Tawstock, viewed from Codden Hill looking westwards

All that remains of the Elizabethan mansion re-built by William Bourchier, 3rd Earl of Bath is the gatehouse, with date-stone 1574. The house burned down in 1787 and was rebuilt in the Neo-Gothic style by about 1800. In about 1940 Rev. Sir Albany Bourchier Sherard Wrey, 13th Baronet, let Tawstock Court to St Michael's Preparatory School. The 14th Baronet sold it to the school which continued to occupy it until it went into administration in 2012. Later that year it was bought by a property investor and developer, as a private residence. As part of the sale the nursery school division of St Michael's School continued to operate as of 2013 in the stable blocks to the immediate west of the house.

A building described as "a folly, built in form of look-out tower" located near the Manor was dubbed "The Tower" in its 1965 Grade II listing report (Entry Number 1253651). The structure was restored and converted into a home that was listed for sale in 2019/2020 as "Tawstock Castle". Some reports states that the tower was thought to have been built by Sir Bourchier Wrey of the Manor and subsequently expanded. The Historic England summary simply indicates that it probably originated in the late 18th century. An article in Country Life magazine referred to the structure as a "baby Windsor Castle".

== Estate of Corffe ==
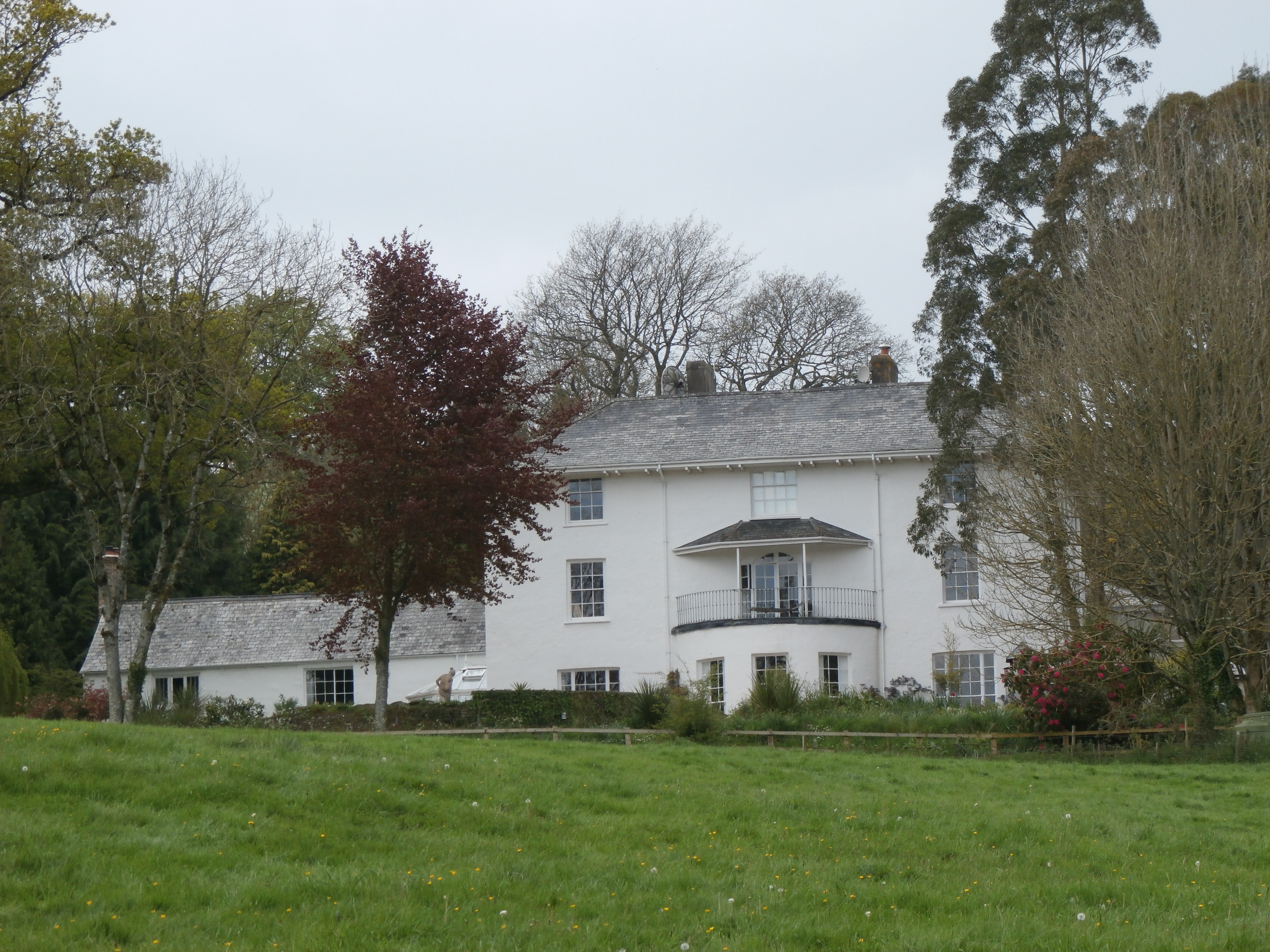
Corffe, Tawstock, as rebuilt sometime between 1790 and 1822

The estate of Corffe belonged formerly to the Hearle family, and came to the Lovett family by the marriage of Edward Lovett (1627–1702), whose mural monument survives in Tawstock Church (a son of Sir Robert Lovett (1577–1643) of Liscombe House, Soulbury, Buckinghamshire, Sheriff of Buckinghamshire in 1610) with Joan Hearle (1642–1709), the heiress of Corffe. The Lovett family is very ancient and William Lovett is said to have been "Wolf Hunter" (Louvetier) to William the Conqueror, hence the family's arms of Argent, three wolves passant in pale sable, which can be seen on various mural monuments in Tawstock Church. The family retained its ancient seat of Liscombe until 1907.

Edward Lovett's sister Anne Lovett (born 1615/19) became the second wife of Edward Bourchier, 4th Earl of Bath (1590–1636), of Tawstock Court, but the marriage was without children. She married secondly (as his second wife) to Baptist Noel, 3rd Viscount Campden (1611–1682). Sir Henry Northcote, 4th Baronet (1655–1730), a physician, married Penelope Lovett, daughter and heiress of Edward Lovett. He lived at Corffe, and died there in 1730. His mural monument is situated in Tawstock Church. Sir Henry Northcote's elder brother was Sir Francis Northcote, 3rd Baronet (died 1709), of Hayne in the parish of Newton St Cyres, Devon, who was the husband of Anne Wrey, a daughter of Sir Chichester Wrey, 3rd Baronet (1628–1668), who had married Lady Anne Bourchier, one of the three daughters and co-heiresses of Edward Bourchier, 4th Earl of Bath (1590–1636), and heiress of Tawstock.

In 1790 Corffe was exchanged with the Rector of Tawstock for glebe land, and the parsonage-house (standing in 1822) was built on the premises by the Rev. Bourchier William Wrey, rector in 1822. The advowson of Tawstock, thus control of the Rectory, was held by the Wrey family. Sir Robert Bourchier Sherard Wrey, 11th Baronet (1855–1917) made Corffe his residence, having let Tawstock Court.
