= St Ive =

Village in Cornwall, England

Coordinates: 50.480°N 4.382°W

St Ive: Cornish: Sen Iv
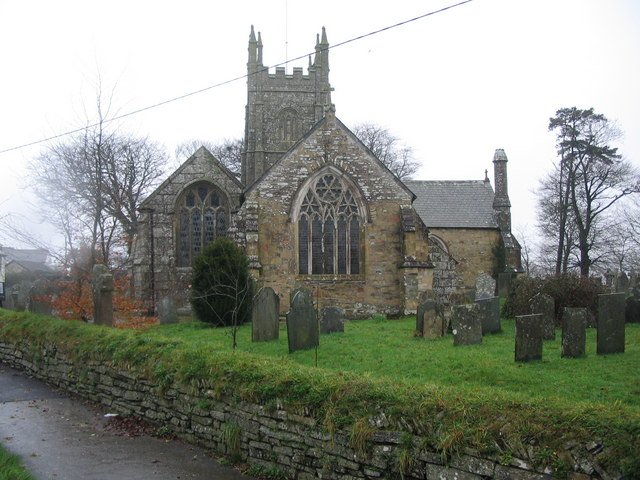
- The parish church in St Ive Church End, constructed c. 1338

- Location within Cornwall
- Population: 2,231 (United Kingdom Census 2011 including Bodway )
- OS grid reference: SX311672
- Civil parish: St Ive and Pensilva
- Unitary authority: Cornwall
- Ceremonial county: Cornwall
- Region: South West
- Country: England
- Sovereign state: United Kingdom
- Post town: LISKEARD
- Postcode district: PL14
- Dialling code: 01579
- Police: Devon and Cornwall
- Fire: Cornwall
- Ambulance: South Western
- UK Parliament: South East Cornwall

St Ive (/ˈiːv/ EEV; Cornish: Sen Iv) is a village in the civil parish of St Ive and Pensilva in eastern Cornwall, United Kingdom. The village is split into four parts: St Ive Church End, St Ive Cross, St Ive Keason and St Ive Parkfield. In addition to the parish an electoral ward exists stretching north of St Ive. The population at the 2011 census was 4,246.

== History and geography ==
The parish used to be a large rural area of rolling landscape with wooded valleys and the population was sparse with the largest village being St Ive itself, located on the A390. The hamlet of Woolston lies to the northwest of St Ive. The demography of the parish was radically altered with the mid-Victorian mining boom centred on Caradon Hill. South Caradon Mine situated just over the parish border was at one time the largest and most prosperous copper mine in the world. Until 1 April 2021 the parish was called St Ive, when it was renamed to "St Ive and Pensilva".

Emily Hobhouse, the social activist, and her brother Leonard Hobhouse, the politician and sociologist, were both born in St Ive.

== Parish church ==
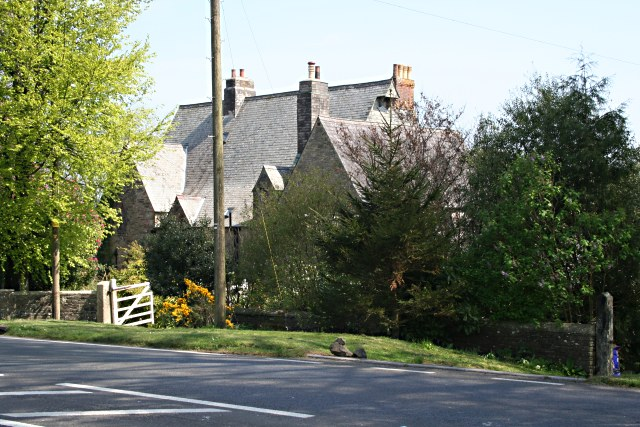
The old vicarage, St Ive

The parish church is probably dedicated to Saint Ive. However it is not certain whether he was a supposedly Persian bishop whose body was found in 1001 at St Ives in Cambridgeshire. The building is mainly 14th century and similar to the church of South Hill, though more elaborate in detail. The consecration of the church in 1338 is recorded in the diocesan register. The south aisle, south porch and the top of the tower were added either in the 15th or early 16th century: (the tower has 12 pinnacles). The pulpit is dated 1700 but is in the Jacobean style. A monument to J. Lyne, d. 1791, is by Robert Isbell; another monument to John Wrey, of the Wrey family, formerly of Trebeigh Manor within the parish, was moved to their principal seat of Tawstock, Devon, in 1924.

There are two stone crosses in the churchyard. One is a Latin wayside cross which was found in use as a gatepost in one of the glebe fields near the churchyard in 1932. A month later it was erected in its present position. The other is an incomplete cross which was found in the vicarage garden in 1965. In 1982 it was erected in the churchyard.

== Trebeigh Manor ==
Trebeigh, St Ive, in Cornwall was a manor listed in Domesday Book as held by the Earl of Mortain, the largest landholder in that county. He is said to have taken it away wrongfully from the church. Contrary to popular belief, it was never owned by the Knights Templar. In 1338 Trebeigh belonged to the Hospital of St John or Knights Hospitaller, later the Knights of Malta, and formed the Preceptory of Trebeigh. Following the Dissolution of the Monasteries the manor of Trebeigh was granted by Queen Elizabeth I in 1573 to Henry Wilbye and George Blyke, from whom it was acquired by John Wrey, who made it his family's chief seat until his descendants inherited Tawstock in Devon from the Bourchiers in 1654. The family owned the Wheal Wrey mine in the parish.

== Notable residents ==
- Emily Hobhouse, (1860–1926), welfare campaigner, who is primarily remembered for bringing the appalling conditions in the British concentration camps in South Africa, built for Boer women and children during the Second Boer War, to the attention of the British public, and campaigning to change these appalling conditions. Her ashes were ensconced at the foot of the National Women's Monument.
- Leonard Hobhouse (1864–1929), an English liberal political theorist and sociologist, brother of Emily,
- Jacquetta Marshall (1878–1961), the first female Lord Mayor of Plymouth in 1950–51.
