= John Lambrick Vivian =

English genealogist and historian (1830–1896)

Lieutenant Colonel John Lambrick Vivian (1830–1896), Inspector of Militia and Her Majesty's Superintendent of Police and Police Magistrate for St Kitts, West Indies, was an English genealogist and historian. He edited editions of the Heraldic Visitations of Devon and of Cornwall, standard reference works for historians of these two counties. Both contain an extensive pedigree of the Vivian family of Devon and Cornwall, produced largely by his own researches.

== Origins ==
He was the only son of John Vivian (1791–1872) of Rosehill, Camborne, Cornwall, by his wife Mary Lambrick (1794–1872), eldest daughter of John Lambrick (1762–1798) of Erisey, Ruan Major, and co-heiress of her infant brother John Lambrick (1798–1799). His maternal grandmother was Mary Hammill, eldest daughter of Peter Hammill (d. 1799) of Trelissick in Sithney, Cornwall, the ancestry of which family he traced back to the holders of the 13th century French title Comte de Hamel. He stated himself to be the senior representative of the family of Hamel.

== Publications ==
=== Visitations of Cornwall ===
==== 1874 edition ====
- Vivian, J. L.; Drake, H. H., eds. (1874). The Visitation of the County of Cornwall in the year 1620. Harleian Society, 1st ser. Vol. 9. London. (see also: Cornish heraldry)
  - His 1874 work was a series of very brief, largely unannotated, pedigrees, covering only a few generations for each family. It merely transcribes the often very brief Heraldic Visitation return documents signed by the senior member of each family. Even blazons of coats of arms are omitted from the 1874 work. This work was greatly expanded in his 1887 work.

==== 1887 edition ====
- Vivian, J. L., ed., The Visitations of Cornwall: comprising the Heralds' Visitations of 1530, 1573 & 1620; with additions by J. L. Vivian , Exeter, 1887, published by W. Pollard. (Index pp. 643–672)
  - His 1887 work was a greatly expanded version of his 1874 work. It contains not only the genealogical data from the Heraldic Visitations stated, but also a great deal of further research and annotations by Vivian, much taken from parish registers and published family histories. Frequently he extends pedigrees back as far as the Norman Conquest and forward to his own times. He also notes where church monuments exist for certain individuals, using the letters "MI".

=== Visitations of Devon ===
==== 1895 edition ====
- Vivian, Lt.Col. J. L., (Ed.) The Visitations of the County of Devon: Comprising the Heralds' Visitations of 1531, 1564 & 1620, Exeter, 1895.
  - This is a work on the lines of his 1887 work on Cornwall and contains a huge amount of additional annotation derived from Vivian's own researches. Much of the information from the 1887 Cornwall work is repeated, due to the extensive inter-marriages of the gentry families of Devon and Cornwall, which can be explained due to the geographic isolation of these two adjoining counties on the south western peninsula of England. Several prominent Devon families had their origins in Cornwall and vice versa. The pedigree for the Vivian family, in all its branches, occupies pages 747 to 763 of his 1895 work, surpassing in volume even that of the great Devon family of Courtenay, extending to only 10 pages. He commences the pedigree of Vivian with the entry "Henry III, King of England", whose descendants actually play no role in the family's pedigree until the 16th century.

=== Other works ===
- Collection of Wills from Devon & Cornwall.
  - A collection of about 5,000 detailed abstracts of wills and administrations from Devon and Cornwall. They are mostly from the Prerogative Court of Canterbury and also include Exeter, Barnstaple and Totnes wills plus some from the Archdeaconry Court of Cornwall. The only available copy of this work resides in the British Library

== Residence ==
His residence in 1882 was 7 Clifton Road, Camden Square, London NW.

== Sources ==
- Vivian, Lt.Col. J. L., (Ed.) The Visitations of the County of Devon: Comprising the Heralds' Visitations of 1531, 1564 & 1620, Exeter, 1895, p. 763, pedigree of Vivian of Rosehill
