= Sourton =

Village in Devon, England

Coordinates: 50.694°N 4.076°W

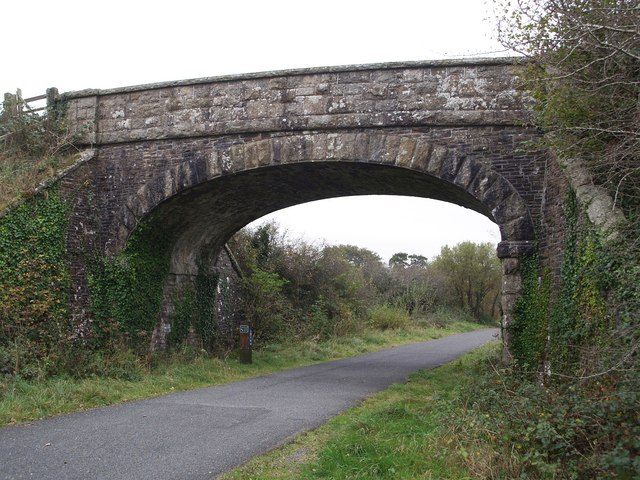
- The bridge in Sourton

- Location within Devon
- Population: 420 2011 census
  - London: 205 miles (330 km)
- Civil parish: Sourton
- Shire county: Devon
- Region: South West
- Country: England
- Sovereign state: United Kingdom
- Post town: OKEHAMPTON
- Postcode district: EX20
- Police: Devon and Cornwall
- Fire: Devon and Somerset
- Ambulance: South Western
- UK Parliament: Torridge and West Devon

Sourton is a small village and civil parish in West Devon, England. It lies about 4 miles (6 km) south-west of Okehampton. It is at the north-western extremity of Dartmoor, a National Park of England and Wales, and lies along the A386 road. The historic map of Sourton shows that it is located near a river and the Sourton forest this can be seen in the image below.

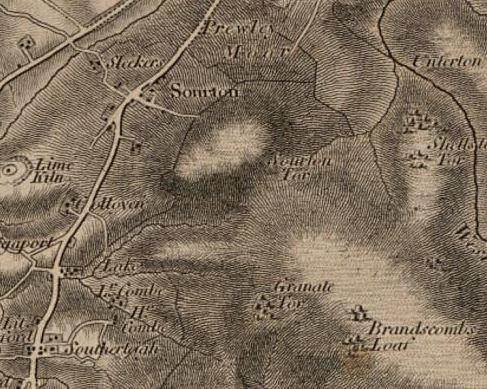
A historical map showing Sourton

According to the 2001 census Sourton parish had a population of 406, and according to the 2011 census it had a population of 420. There is a public house in Sourton. In the 1870s Sourton was described as

SOURTON, a parish, with a few small hamlets, in Okehampton district, Devon; 5 miles SW of Okehampton r. station. Post town, Bridestow, North Devon

One of Sourton's main tourist attractions is the Highwayman Inn, built in 1812. In 1959, the inn was transformed into a fairy-tale and Aladdin's cave; this included the old Launceston to Tavistock coach being installed as the entrance to the inn. It is claimed to be the most unusual inn in Britain and is said to have a ghost.

== Housing ==
Many of the houses in Sourton are bungalows with a count of 191, or detached households with a count of 146. This is typical of a small village parish. This also is supported by the occupations in Sourton showing that the income in the area fits with the fact that there are very few terraced houses which make up a total of 9 houses in Sourton. The majority of houses in Sourton are owned outright, with very few council houses or rented houses recorded on the 2011 data set. The average number of rooms per house in Sourton is 5 or more. The number of houses in Sourton decreased from 135 in 1841 to just 86 in 1901, which is consistent with the decrease in population; it then increases to 105 houses in 1931.

== Occupations ==
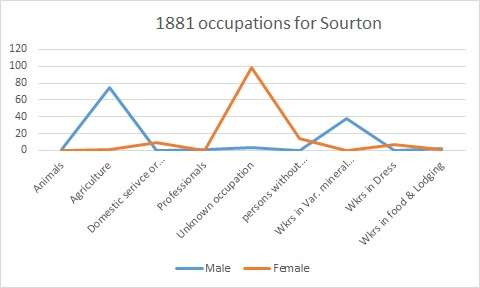
A graph showing the different occupations of men and women in Sourton in 1881

From the 1881 occupational data that is available, the main occupation was in agriculture with around 75 men working in agriculture, showing that the occupation within agriculture was dominated by the male workforce. However, the majority of the female work force in 1881 was unknown or within the domestic services which would have been the typical role of the female in this time period. From the data that is available in 2001, the average distance that people travelled to work was 10 km with the majority of people remote working. The main occupation in 2001 was in the skilled trade, which was mainly related to agriculture. However, there are more people within managers, senior officials and professionals within the technical occupations. In 2011, there is an increase in skilled jobs with a higher number of people working as managing directors and senior officials and with fewer people working with agriculture showing that Sourton has changed from an agriculture workforce to a more skilled and higher paid occupations. Also from the 2001 data available, the majority of occupations are full-time with the average person working between 30-60 hours a week.

== Population ==
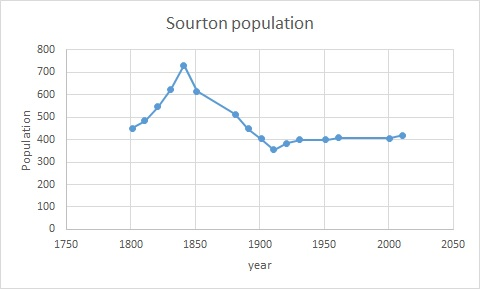
Population of Sourton civil parish, Devon, as reported by the census of population from 1881-2011

Sourton's population is mainly dominated by the older population, with 233 people aged between 45 and 75 years old with only 103 people aged between 20 and 44 this was the recorded figure in 2001; this gives a sense that there is an ageing population; this is also supported by the fact that there are only 62 dependants in Sourton according to the data available from the 2001 census data, indicating that the area is attractive to an older population. The graph shows there is a population drop between 1841 and 1891; this could be due to a boundary change. Within 1901, the population had levelled out to around 400 up until 2011, where it has started to increase slightly. From the 2011 data available the main ethnic group is White: Irish/British, with the main religion in Sourton being Christian

== 2026 Helicopter Crash ==
On the 3 June 2026, a Royal Navy Merlin Mk4 (Callsign: Sword 01 & Registration: ZJ131) of 846 Naval Air Squadron had departed RNAS Yeovilton, Somerset a night time training exercise with another Merlin, The helicopter crashed into a field at 03:45 GMT in Sourton Down, killing its three occupants. The three casualties were named as Royal Navy aircrew Lieutenant Lily-Mae Fisher, Petty Officer Owen Green and Lieutenant Commander Chris Gayson.
