= Tuchet =

Tuchet is a surname, and may refer to:

- John Tuchet, 4th Baron Audley (1371–1408) (abeyance terminated 1408 (or 1403?))
- James Touchet, 5th Baron Audley (c. 1398 – 1459)
- John Tuchet, 6th Baron Audley (died 1490)
- James Tuchet, 7th Baron Audley (c. 1463 – 1497) (forfeit 1497)
- John Tuchet, 8th Baron Audley (c. 1483 – 1558) (restored 1512)
- George Tuchet, 9th Baron Audley (died 1560)
- Henry Tuchet, 10th Baron Audley (died 1563)
- George Tuchet, 1st Earl of Castlehaven (c. 1551 – 1616), Baron Audley
- Mervyn Tuchet, 2nd Earl of Castlehaven (1593–1631), Baron Audley
- James Tuchet, 3rd Earl of Castlehaven (c. 1617 – 1684), Baron Audley of Hely
- Mervyn Tuchet, 4th Earl of Castlehaven (died 1686), Baron in the Peerage of England
- James Tuchet, 5th Earl of Castlehaven (died 1700), Baron in the Peerage of England
- James Tuchet, 6th Earl of Castlehaven (died 1740), Baron in the Peerage of England
- James Tuchet, 7th Earl of Castlehaven (1723–1769), Baron in the Peerage of England
- John Tuchet, 8th Earl of Castlehaven (1724–1777), Baron Audley

== See also ==
- Baron Tuchet
- Tuchet-Jesson
- Earl of Castlehaven
- Baron Audley
