= Touchet =

Touchet is a surname, and may refer to:

Members of the English peerage:

- James Touchet, 5th Baron Audley, (c. 1398–1459)
- George Thicknesse-Touchet, 19th Baron Audley (1758–1818)
  - George Thicknesse-Touchet, 20th Baron Audley, (1783–1837)
    - George Edward Thicknesse-Touchet, 21st Baron Audley (1817–1872)
      - Mary Thicknesse-Touchet, 22nd Baroness Audley (1868–1942)
        - Thomas Touchet-Jesson, 23rd Baron Audley (1913–1963)

Other people:

- George Anselm Touchet (died c. 1689), Roman Catholic chaplain of Queen Catherine of Braganza, the wife of King Charles II
- Jacques Touchet (fl. 1917), French illustrator
- Marie Touchet, (1549– 1638), mistress of Charles IX of France
- Stanislas Touchet (1842–1926), French Cardinal of the Roman Catholic Church

== See also ==
- Touchet, Washington, US
- Touchet River, US
- Touchet Formation
- Touche (disambiguation)
