= James Tuchet =

James Tuchet (or Touchet) may refer to:

- James Tuchet, 5th Baron Audley (1398–1459)
- James Tuchet, 7th Baron Audley (c. 1463–1497), forfeit 1497
- James Tuchet, 3rd Earl of Castlehaven (1617–1684)
- James Tuchet, 5th Earl of Castlehaven (?–1700)
- James Tuchet, 6th Earl of Castlehaven (?–1740)
- James Tuchet, 7th Earl of Castlehaven (1723–1769)
