= John Tuchet =

John Tuchet may refer to:

- John Tuchet, 4th Baron Audley (1371–1408), English peer
- John Tuchet, 6th Baron Audley (1423–1490), English politician
- John Tuchet, 8th Baron Audley (c. 1483–1557), English peer
- John Tuchet, 8th Earl of Castlehaven (1724–1777), Irish peer
