= George Tuchet =

George Tuchet may refer to:

- George Tuchet, 9th Baron Audley (died 1560)
- George Tuchet, 1st Earl of Castlehaven (c. 1551 – 1617)
- George Anselm Touchet, also spelt Tuchet, Roman Catholic chaplain
