= Maria Thynne =

Maria, Lady Thynne
- Born: Maria Tuchet; 1578
- Died: 1611 (aged 32–33)
- Other name: "Mall"
- Occupation: gentlewoman
- Known for: a romance similar to "Romeo and Juliet" and the legal dispute
- Spouse: Thomas Thynne
- Children: Two
- Parent: Lord Audley

Maria, Lady Thynne born Maria Tuchet nicknamed "Mall" (1578 – 1611) was an English gentlewoman whose marriage was against her and her husband's family's wishes and this led to a long legal dispute. It is possible that this story influenced William Shakespeare to start to rewrite the Italian story of Romeo and Juliet. Maria and her mother-in-law's correspondence is extant and gives an insight into their disagreement.

== Life ==
Thynne was born in 1578 she was the second daughter of Lucy and Lord Audley. Her grandfather was Sir James Marvin or Mervyn.

In May 1594, at the age of sixteen she served at the court of Queen Elizabeth. There she met and married Thomas Thynne at an inn at Beaconsfield. In the 1500s it was possible for a couple to marry by just saying "“I (name) take thee (name) to my wedded wife/husband and there unto I plight my troth” to each other and with witnesses this was legally binding. Thynne was the son and heir of Sir John Thynne of Longleat, a knight of the shire. The two were married on the day they first met and for some time kept their marriage secret because their fathers were bitterly opposed to each other, continuing a feud which had begun in the previous generation. When their story became known, Thynne's parents and Joan Thynne in particular, tried unsuccessfully to have the marriage annulled. The dispute over the marriage was resolved in 1601 by Daniel Donne who was the Dean of the Court of Arches, who ruled against Joan Thynne's claim. When Joan's husband John died in 1604 Longleat went into the hands of Maria (her enemy). Joan was not beaten and in 1605 she, on behalf of her daughters, took her son to the chancery court.

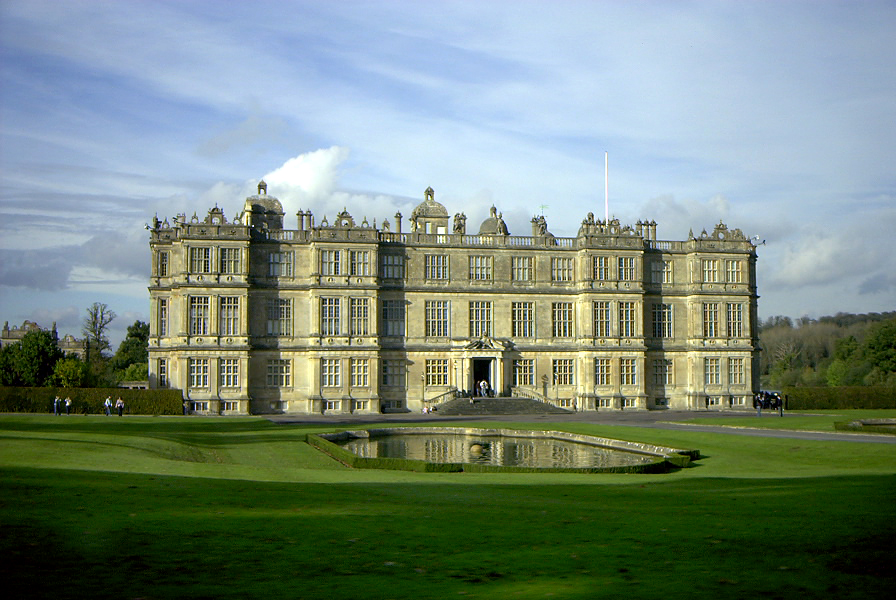
Longleat House in 2005

These events may have provided the impetus (or not), the next year, for William Shakespeare to produce the play Romeo and Juliet, based on an earlier Italian story that begins with a similar clandestine marriage between feuding families. Thomas and Maria Thynne had three sons, before she died in childbirth. Two of these sons survived childhood, James Thynne (died 1670) and Sir Thomas Thynne. Thomas's mother did not forgive him for his marriage and she took out a court case on behalf of her daughter against Thomas.

Eventually her husband, who had since been knighted, inherited his father's estates, including Longleat House. During his frequent absences, Maria managed the estates, including forestry and livestock. She hired servants and negotiated with tenants and retainers. She accepted the leases and reported to her husband about late payers. In 1609 and 1610 she took over the financial management of the purchase of the Manor of Warminster from her brother Mervyn Tuchet.

Thynne's surviving correspondence between 1595 and 1611 was published by the Wiltshire Record Society in 1983 as part of the title Two Elizabethan Women: correspondence of Joan and Maria Thynne. After the death of Maria in 1611, her husband married secondly Catherine Howard, a daughter of Hon. Charles Howard, son of the first Viscount Howard and niece of Lord Howard of Bindon. With her he had further sons, including Sir Henry Frederick Thynne, 1st Baronet (1615–1680), ancestor of the Marquesses of Bath.
