= Mervyn Tuchet =

Mervyn Tuchet may refer to:

- Mervyn Tuchet, 2nd Earl of Castlehaven
- Mervyn Tuchet, 4th Earl of Castlehaven
