= Cabbage Garden, Dublin =

Former burial ground in Dublin, Ireland

Cabbage Garden Burial Ground
- Garraí an Chabáiste
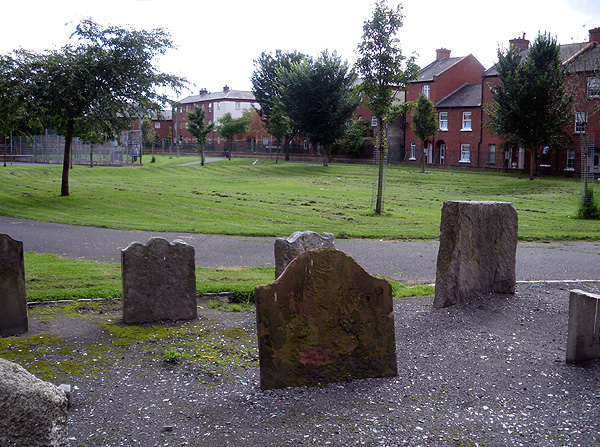
- Part of the burial ground was converted into a public park in 1982
- Interactive map of Cabbage Garden Burial Ground

Details
- Established: 1666
- Closed: 1896
- Location: Cathedral Lane, Dublin
- Country: Ireland
- Coordinates: 53.337°N 6.271°W
- Type: Public
- Owned by: Chapter of St. Patrick's Cathedral
- Size: 0.56 hectares (1.4 acres)
- Website: Official website
- Find a Grave: Cabbage Garden Burial Ground

The Cabbage Garden (Irish: Garraí an Chabáiste), also known as the Cabbage Patch, is a former burial ground in Dublin, Ireland. It is located off Upper Kevin Street in Dublin's south inner city. Used as a cemetery from 1666 until the 1890s, it is now laid-out as a public park.

== History ==
The name of the plot can be traced back to the arrival of Oliver Cromwell in Dublin during 1649, whose forces rented the land from a local landowner, and planted cabbages as a food source.

The ground was consecrated by James Margetson, Church of Ireland Archbishop of Armagh in 1668. It consisted of a plot of land which was set apart by the Dean and Chapter of St. Patrick's Cathedral in 1666 for the purposes of a cemetery for the inhabitants of St. Patrick's Close and of the parish of St. Nicholas Without, as their cemetery had become overcrowded. Later part of this plot was reserved for the burial of Huguenots, who worshipped in the Lady Chapel in the cathedral.

The burial ground was closed in 1878 to all but 14 families. The last interment took place in 1896 and the cemetery closed early in the 20th century. Towards the end of the 20th century, part of the ground was converted into a public park while the rest was covered by public housing constructed by Dublin Corporation at the junction of Cathedral Lane and Upper Kevin Street. Dublin City Council opened the park in 1982.

The park, which is referred to by Dublin City Council as the "Cabbage Patch", can be reached by way of Cathedral Lane (until 1792 called Cabbage Garden Lane).

== Notable burials ==
- Historian Edward Ledwich and a number of members of his family.
- Members of the La Touche family.
