= James Audley (died 1369) =

Founder knight of the Order of the Garter (1318–1369)

Sir James Audley KG
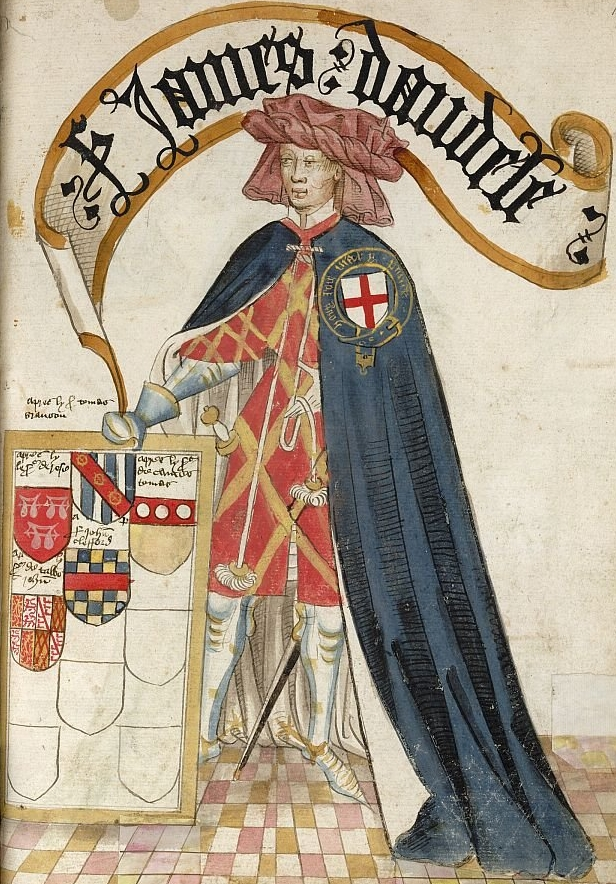
- Sir James Audley
- Born: 1318
- Died: 1369 (aged 50–51); Fontenay-le-Comte
- Known for: One of the original knights, or founders, of the Order of the Garter

Sir James Audley, KG (also Audeley; c. 1318 – 1369) was one of the original knights, or founders, of the Order of the Garter. He was the eldest son of Sir James Audley of Audley in Staffordshire.

== Biography ==
When the order of the Garter was founded, he was initiated as one of its first members and his stall in St. George's Chapel, Windsor was the eleventh on the side of Edward, the Black Prince. He served in France in 1346, where, at Crecy, he fought in the rearguard under Richard Fitzalan, Earl of Arundel. In August 1350 he took part in the naval Battle of Winchelsea. When hostilities were renewed between England and France in 1354 Sir James was in constant attendance upon the Black Prince, and earned a great reputation for valour.

The Black Prince Thanking Lord James Audley for his Gallantry in the Battle of Poitiers by Benjamin Robert Haydon, 1842

At the Battle of Poitiers on September 19, 1356 he took his stand in front of the English army, and after fighting for a long time was severely wounded and carried from the fight. After the victory, the prince inquired after Sir James, who was brought to the royal tent, where Edward told him he had been the bravest knight on his side, and granted him an annuity of five hundred marks. Sir James made over this gift to the four esquires who had attended him during the battle, and received from the prince a further pension of six hundred marks. A variation of this story states that, after commending highly his four esquires, and attributing his success mainly to their enterprising spirit, made over to them the donation of five hundred marks. This act of generosity coming to the ear of the prince Edward, and, approving what he had done, confirmed the grant to the esquires, assigning to sir James an annual rent of six hundred marks.

In 1359 he was one of the leaders of an expedition into France. In 1360 he took the fortress of Chaven in Brittany, as well as the castle of Ferte-sous-Jouarre, and was present at Calais when peace was made between England and France in October 1360. He was afterwards governor of Aquitaine and great seneschal of Poitou, and took part in the capture of the town of La Roche-sur-Yon by Edmund, earl of Cambridge. He died in 1369 at Fontenay-le-Comte, where he had gone to reside, and was buried at Poitiers.

Hr was the subject of a large history painting The Black Prince Thanking Lord James Audley for his Gallantry in the Battle of Poitiers by Benjamin Robert Haydon, commissioned by his descendant George Thicknesse-Touchet, 20th Baron Audley and completed in 1842.

Arms

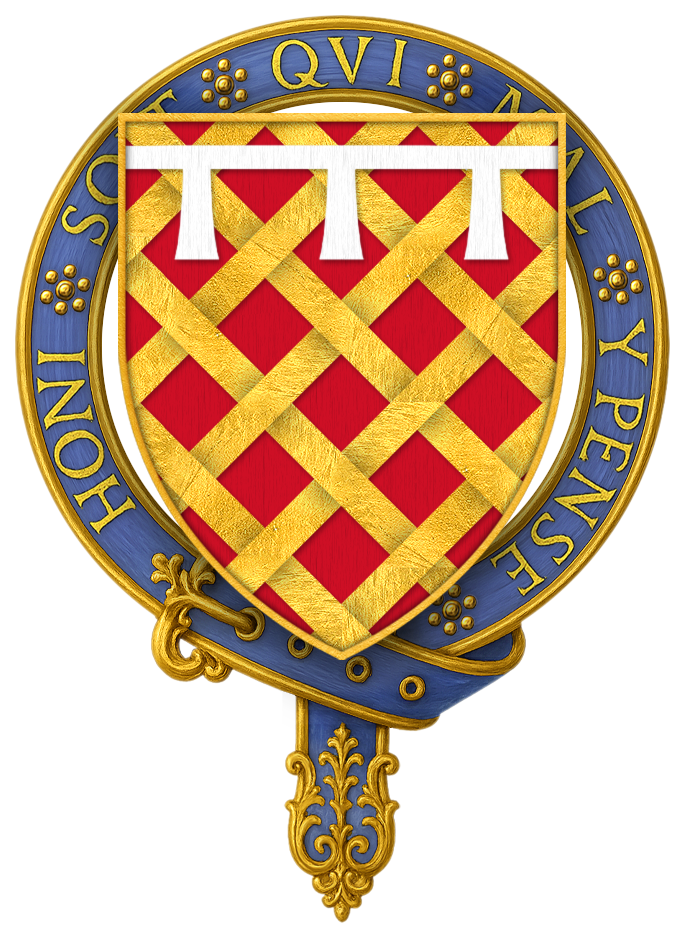
Arms of Sir James Audeley, KG

"Gules fretty Or" – Henry de Aldithley (or Audley), 1st in the line of Lord Audeley who died in 1246, had a seal with a fretty shield and his descendants bore a shield described as 'gules fretty or'. That is a red shield with a gold lattice. Information from Complete Peerage Vol 1 page 337 by G E Cokayne.

== Attribution ==
- Endnotes
  - Jean Froissart, Chroniques, translated by Thomas Johnes (Hafod, 1810);
  - George Frederick Beltz, Memorials of the Most Noble Order of the Garter (London, 1841).
