= Philip Thicknesse =

British Army officer and writer (1719–1792)

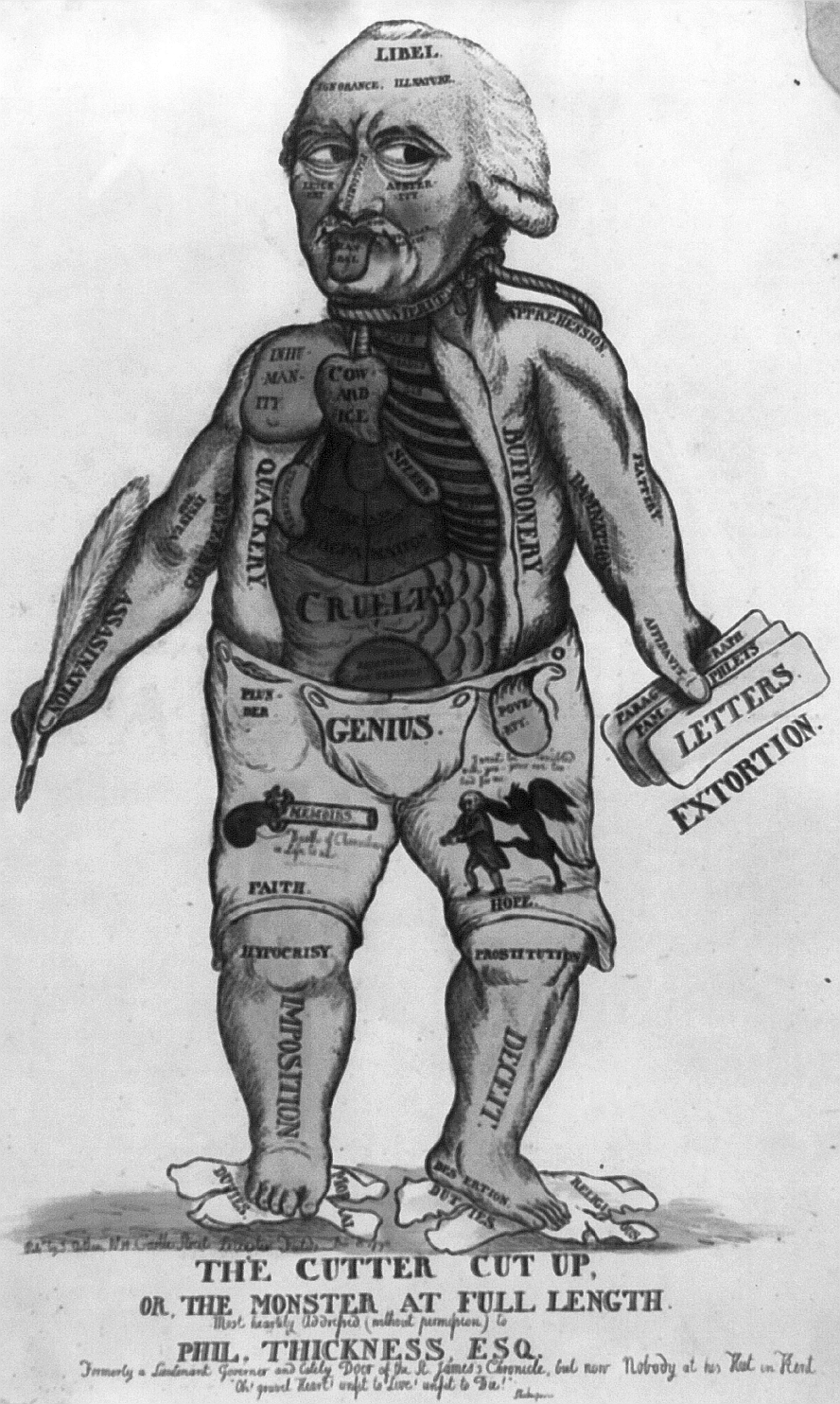
A 1790 caricature of Philip Thicknesse, trampling on moral and religious duties, his person covered with defamatory inscriptions

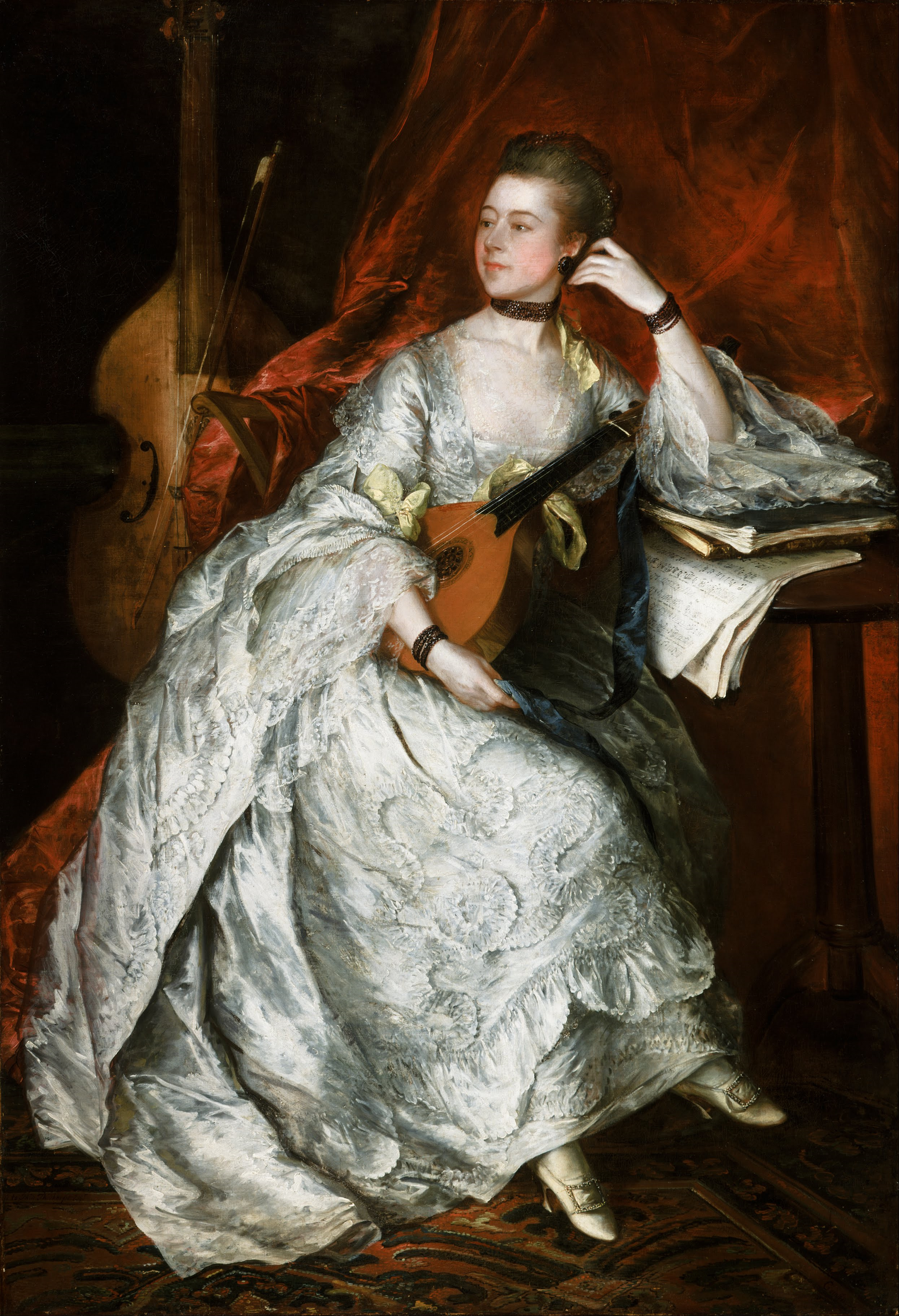
Thomas Gainsborough, Ann Ford, later Mrs Philip Thicknesse, 1760

Captain Philip Thicknesse (1719 – 23 November 1792) was a British Army officer and writer who was a friend of the artist Thomas Gainsborough. He wrote several travel guides.

== Early life ==
Philip Thicknesse was born in Staffordshire, England, son of John Thicknesse, Rector of Farthinghoe, Northamptonshire, and Joyce (née Blencowe) Thicknesse. He was brought up in Farthinghoe. His brother George Thicknesse was a schoolmaster.

== Career ==
Thicknesse visited the Province of Georgia in September 1736 but returned to England in 1737, claiming to be the first of the emigrants to return. He obtained a commission as a captain of an independent company of the British Army in Jamaica after 1737. On an expedition against Jamaican Maroons in the Blue Mountains, he wrote of encounters with Windward Maroon leaders Quao and Queen Nanny. He transferred to a marine regiment as a Captain-Lieutenant in 1740. He was later Lieutenant-Governor of Landguard Fort, Suffolk (1753–1766).

Thicknesse was a friend of the society artist Thomas Gainsborough, whom he met in about 1753, and of his less well-known brother, the inventor Humphrey Gainsborough. As an author, he wrote for The Gentleman's Magazine. He also published The Speaking Figure and the Automaton Chess Player, Exposed and Detected, a none-too-accurate exposé of a chess-playing machine, The Turk.

== Marriages and family ==
In 1742, Thicknesse eloped with Maria Lanove, a wealthy heiress, whom he abducted from a street in Southampton. They moved to Bath, taking advantage of the social whirl. In 1749, Maria and his children (by then three) contracted diphtheria. She and two children died, leaving a daughter, Anna. When Maria's parents died some time later (his mother-in-law committing suicide), he spent much time trying to claim their fortune.

Thicknesse then married Lady Elizabeth Tuchet, daughter of James Tuchet, 6th Earl of Castlehaven, and Hon. Elizabeth Arundell, on 10 May 1749. They had a daughter, Elizabeth, (b.1750) and a son George (1758–1818), later 19th Baron Audley. Lady Elizabeth died in childbirth in 1762.

His third wife was his late wife's companion, Anne Ford (1732–1824), daughter of Thomas Ford, whom he married on 27 September 1762. She was a gifted, well-educated musician with a beautiful voice and knew five languages. She gave Sunday concerts at her father's house, but her ambition was to become a professional actress, and despite fatherly disapproval, left home to go on the stage. She and Thicknesse had a son, Captain John Thicknesse. RN (c. 1763–1846). The couple spent time travelling in Europe.

In later life, he lived in the Royal Crescent, Bath in a house he then let out and sold. He moved to another, St. Catherine's Hermitage, and landscaped the grounds to create a "hermit's cell" for himself.

== Death and will ==
Thicknesse died on a journey near Boulogne, Pas-de-Calais, France and was buried there. In his later life, he had become an "ornamental hermit". His will stipulated that his right hand be cut off and delivered to his son, George, who was inattentive, "to remind him of his duty to God after having so long abandoned the duty he owed to a father, who once so affectionately loved him."

== Books ==
- 1768: Useful Hints to those who Make the Tour of France. This gains a mention from a character in Tobias Smollett's epistolary novel The Expedition of Humphry Clinker.
- 1772: A Treatise on the Art of Decyphering, And of Writing in Cyphers, With An Harmonic Alphabet
- 1777: A Year's Journey through France and Part of Spain. 2 vols. Bath: printed by R. Cruttwell, for the author; and sold by Wm. Brown, London
- 1778: The New Prose Bath Guide : for the year 1778. [London?]: Printed for the author and sold by Dodsley
- 1786: A Year's Journey Through The Pais Bas: or, Austrian Netherlands. London, printed for J. Debrett
- 1788: Memoirs and Anecdotes of Philip Thicknesse, Late Lieutenant-Governor of Land Guard Fort, and unfortunately Father to George Touchet, Baron Audley. Printed for the Author, MDCCLXXXVIII. [1788]. A third volume followed in 1791.
- He also contributed to 'A View of the Poorhouse of Datchworth in Herts Addressed to the Overseers of England
