= Joan Thynne =

English gentlewoman

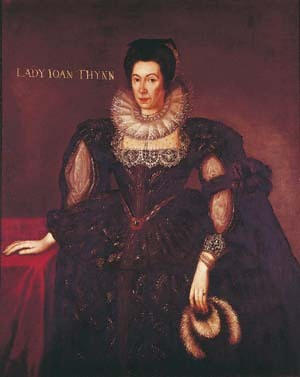
- by an unknown artist
- Born: Joan Hayward baptised 1558
- Died: 3 March 1612 (aged 53–54); London
- Occupation: gentlewoman
- Spouse: John Thynne
- Parent(s): Lady, Joan (born Tyllesworth) and Sir Rowland Hayward

Joan, Lady Thynne, born Joan Hayward (1558 – 3 March 1612) was an English gentlewoman. She took an active role in managing property including Caus Castle. The secret marriage of her son is said to have inspired Shakespeare's retelling of the Romeo and Juliet story. Joan fought the marriage for seven years; she did not forgive her son and took him to court again after he inherited Longleat House.

== Life ==
She was baptised in 1558. Her parents were Lady Joan (born Tyllesworth) and Sir Rowland Hayward, the first Lord Mayor of London. Her mother died in 1580 and her father married again, giving her in time three surviving brothers and two surviving sisters.

She had an arranged marriage with John Thynne (died 1604) and they had two sons including Thomas. As part of the marriage settlement, her father gave them property including Caus Castle, Shropshire, but Edward Stafford, 3rd Baron Stafford disputed the ownership and refused to allow them to occupy the property. Joan was credited with teaching her husband and she was a very involved partner. She advised on tactics and management and she handled the legal disputes with Stafford about the property.

After he and Joan took Caus Castle by force in 1591, Joan lived at Caus whilst John was based at Longleat, Wiltshire. The letters between them illustrate their partnership. Joan appears to have managed many aspects of their estate. She not only managed but is credited with defending Caus Castle, keeping guns and gunpowder in her bedroom.

In 1594, her son Thomas made a secret and – in her opinion, ill-advised – marriage to Maria Tuchet, who was the daughter of George Tuchet, then Lord Audley. Joan was involved in unsuccessful attempts to have that marriage annulled. The story is said to have contributed to the inspiration for Shakespeare's Romeo and Juliet. The dispute over the marriage was resolved in 1601 by Daniel Donne, the Dean of the Court of Arches, who ruled against her claim. When her husband John died in 1604, Longleat passed into the hands of her enemy Maria Thynne. Joan did not forgive her son and in 1605 she, on behalf of her daughters, took him to the Chancery court.

She was a patron of the arts; John Maynard dedicated his satirical music titled The XII Wonders of the World to her in 1611.

Thynne died suddenly in London in 1612. She had made plans for this which she had detailed in her will. Her daughters, not her son, were the executors but they were thwarted as the funds available were insufficient to fund her bequests.
