= Eleanor Davies (poet) =

English poet

Eleanor Davies (formerly Eleanor Tuchet) (1590–1652) was a prolific English writer publishing almost seventy pamphlets during her lifetime.

== Biography ==
The fifth daughter of George Tuchet, 11th Baron Audley, she was learned in Latin, theology and law. In 1609, she married Sir John Davies, by whom she had three children, including their heiress, Lucy Hastings, Countess of Huntingdon. In 1625, she began caring for George Carr, a 13-year-old Scottish boy who was deaf-mute. While living with Davies, he began to utter prophecies and on 28 July 1625, Davies herself began prophesying.

The same year she published her first pamphlet, A Warning to the Dragon and All his Angels, which related the Book of Daniel to contemporary political events.

Davies's husband disliked her prophesying and burned at least one of her manuscripts. Scholar Diane Watt recounts that she responded "by dressing in widow's weeds and predicting that he would die in less than three years. One day in December of the following year, she began to weep uncontrollably during dinner, and three days later her husband died."

In 1627, Davies married Sir Archibald Douglas, a professional soldier. He would also destroy her manuscripts.

Many of Davies's prophecies were based on anagrams. For instance, she read her own name Eleanor Audelie as "Reveale O Daniel".

Queen Henrietta Maria consulted her during her first pregnancy, although her relationship with the royal family was rocky. (She had foretold the death of the Duke of Buckingham, to the king's displeasure.)

Davies was involved in several legal disputes during her life. After her first husband's death, she lost possession of her home at Englefield for a time, as well as her estate at Pirton. In 1634, after smuggling her illegally printed prophecies back into England from Amsterdam, she was arrested and fined £3000 and imprisoned. After her release, she was arrested again and sent to Bedlam for pouring tar over the altar at Lichfield Cathedral. Later in 1638 she was moved to the Tower, from which she was released in 1640. She was arrested twice more for debt and infringement of publishing laws.

== Bibliography ==
- A Warning to the Dragon and All His Angels (1625)
- The Word of God (1644)
- The Everlasting Gospel (1649)
- Bethlehem Signifying the House of Bread (1652)
- Prophetic Writings of Lady Eleanor Davies. Ed. Esther S. Cope. Oxford: Oxford University Press, 1995.
