= Henry Tuchet, 10th Baron Audley =

English peer

The Right Honourable The Baron Audley
- Arms of Tuchet: Ermine, a chevron gules

Personal details
- Born: Henry Tuchet
- Died: 30 December 1563
- Resting place: Betley, Staffordshire, England
- Spouse: Elizabeth Sneyd/Suede
- Children: George; Jakob
- Parent: George Tuchet

Henry Tuchet, 10th Baron Audley, 7th Baron Tuchet (died 30 December 1563) was an English peer.

Henry Tuchet was the son of George Tuchet, 9th Baron Audley (died 1560). He married Elizabeth Sneyd, daughter of Sir William Sneyd ( or Suede ). He inherited his title on the death of his father.

He died on 30 December 1563 and was buried in Betley, Staffordshire. He was succeeded by his son, George Tuchet, 11th Baron Audley (c. 1561–1616), who was made 1st Earl of Castlehaven at the end of his life.

== Family ==
=== Issue ===
- George Tuchet, 11th Baron Audley
- Anne, who married Thomas Brooke, a son of Richard Brooke
- Jakob

Peerage of England
Preceded by George Tuchet	Baron Tuchet; 1560–1563	Succeeded by George Tuchet
Preceded by George Tuchet	Baron Audley; 1560–1563	Succeeded by George Tuchet
