= John Hickey (sculptor) =

Irish sculptor

- Born: 7 November 1751; Dublin, Ireland
- Died: 12 January 1795 (aged 43); London
- Occupation: Sculptor
- Notable work: Monument to David La Touche in Delgany, County Wicklow

John Hickey (7 November 1751–12 January 1795) was an Irish sculptor.

== Life ==
Born in Dublin on 7 November 1751, John was the fourth son of Noah Hickey (1689–1766), a confectioner in Capel Street, and his wife Anne. He had five brothers and two sisters. The artist Thomas Hickey was his older brother.

Hickey was apprenticed to the Dublin carver, Richard Cranfield, and attended the Dublin Society Schools before travelling to London in 1776 to study further at the Royal Academy Schools. He lived in 34 Gerrard Street, Soho. In 1778 he won the Royal Academy Gold Medal for his sculpture Slaughter of the Innocents. He exhibited at the Royal Academy in London from 1777 until death.

Edmund Burke was enthusiastic in promoting his work to create a statue of Henry Grattan in Dublin. Burke also sat for Hickey for two portrait busts in 1785 and 1791. Endorsing Hickey for the commission to create the Grattan statue, Burke wrote:

"It will be a pleasure to you to know that at this time a young man of Ireland is here who, I really think, as far as my judgment goes, is fully equal to the best statuaries both in taste and execution. If you employ him you will encourage the rising arts in the decoration of the rising virtue of Ireland; and though the former, in the scale of things, is infinitely below the latter, there is a kind of relationship between them. I am sure there has ever been a close connexion between them in your mind. The young man's name, who wishes to be employed, is Hickey"

The planned monument to Grattan was never erected. In 1786 he was appointed Sculptor to the Prince of Wales, and designed "a statue of Time supporting a clock for Carlton House".

Hickey suffered with alcoholism, referred to as "intemperate habits" by Strickland, and which Strickland attributes his early death. He died at his lodgings on Oxford Street in London on 12 January 1795.

== Works ==
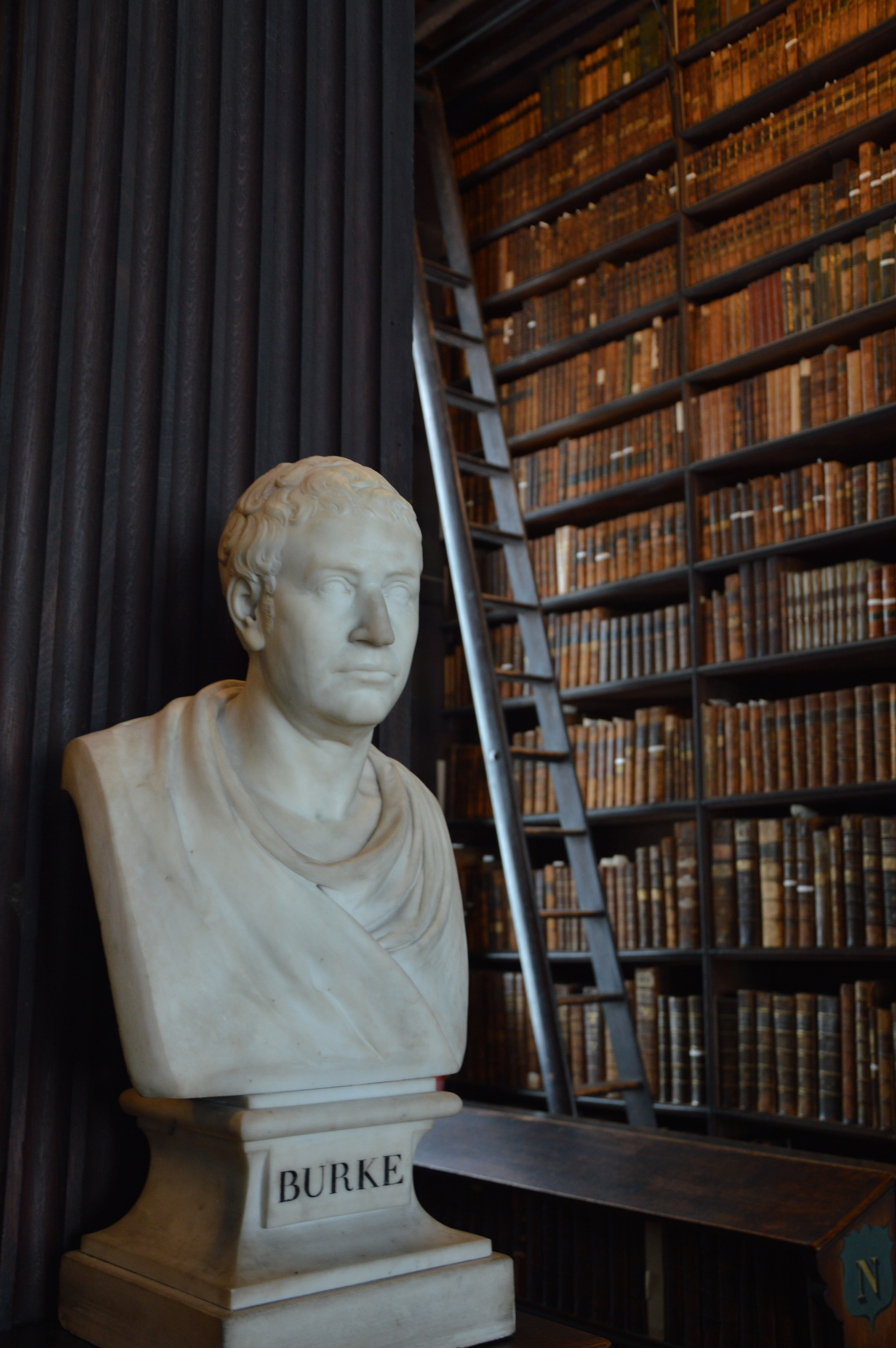
One of Hickey's busts of Edmund Burke in the Library of Trinity College

- Monument to William Dowdeswell at Bushley (1775)
- Monument to Samuel Foster at Grantham (1778)
- Monument to Lord Andrew Archer at the Church of St Mary Magdalene, Tanworth-in-Arden (1778)
- Monument to Mrs Hawkins in St Helen's Church in Abingdon-on-Thames (1780)
- Monument to Mary Child at St Nicholas's Church in Abingdon-on-Thames (1782)
- Monument to General William Haviland at Penn, Buckinghamshire (1784)
- Bust of Lord Loughborough (his patron) (1785)
- Monument to John Spencer at Cawthorne (1786)
- Bust of Mrs Sarah Siddons as Cassandra (1786) (copy held at the Fitzwilliam Museum)
- Monument to Sir Richard Hoare, 1st Baronet in Barnes Parish Church (1787)
- Monument to John Story at Leyton, Essex (1787)
- Statue of "Time" supporting a huge clock at Carlton House (1788)
- Statue of Henry Singleton in St Peter's Church in Drogheda (1788)
- Monument to Mrs Burrell in Beckenham (1789)
- Monument to Joseph Baker in Chichester Cathedral 1789)
- Monument to David La Touche in Delgany, County Wicklow (1790)
- Bust of Edmund Burke (1791) destroyed in Blitz 1941 but a plaster copy exists at Wentworth Woodhouse
- Bust of Mr Thickness of St Paul's School, London (1792)
