= Church of St Nicholas Without, Dublin =

Church in Dublin, Ireland

Coordinates: 53°20′22″N 6°16′17″W

St. Nicholas Without is a former Church of Ireland parish church in Dublin, Ireland. For several hundred years the north transept of St. Patrick's Cathedral formed the church, with a wall separating it from the cathedral.

== The church ==
It received its name during the episcopate of Alexander de Bicknor (1317–1349), when the parish of St Nicholas was extended outside the city so as to include the Manor of St. Sepulchre and the Deanery of St Patrick. The parish was divided into two parts: St Nicholas Within the Walls and St Nicholas Without. In records dating to 1509 and 1662 the parish church continued to be the north transept of St Patrick's Cathedral.

The church was dedicated to Saint Nicholas of Myra, the patron saint of sailors.

The north transept fell into disrepair in the 18th century, and the Lady Chapel (formerly called the French Church, as it had been used by the Huguenots) of the cathedral was rented by the parishioners of St Nicholas Without for £30 per annum. The transept was rebuilt in 1822. It was in use up to 1861, when the parish of St Nicholas Without was united to that of St Luke. Shortly afterwards the Cathedral was renovated, and the north transept re-built.

The church was subject to the Chapter of St Patrick's Cathedral.

== The parish ==
The parish was first mentioned in Pope Celestine's Bull of 1191, listing prebends. In documents from the 14th century (1326 and 1382) the extent of the parish was described as taking in both sides of Patrick Street (except Patrick's Close), New Street and most of Kevin Street. All the names of house-holders are English, except for one, a man named Begg in New Street, described as hibernicus. In 1479 King Edward IV gave permission to John Chevir and other merchants of Dublin to endow a chantry in St Nicholas.

In 1708, an act of parliament was passed, dividing the parish of St Nicholas Without and giving part of it the denomination of St Luke. The two parishes were re-united in 1861.

== The cemetery ==
In 1666 a plot of ground off Kevin Street was set aside for the use of the parish as a burial ground. This became the Cabbage Garden burial ground.

== References and sources ==
Notes

Sources

- George Newenham Wright (2005). "An Historical Guide to the City of Dublin". Online book. Archived from the original on 31 October 2007.
- Donnelly, N (1916). A Short History of Dublin Parishes. Dublin.
- Bernard, J H (1905). The Cathedral Church of Saint Patrick. London: George Bell and Sons.
