= John Maynard (composer) =

English composer

John Maynard (baptised 1577 – in or before 1633) was an English composer at the time of James I of England, with an idiosyncratic sense of humour.

His best known work is the musical setting of The Twelve Wonders of the World by Sir John Davies, possibly written for a banquet arranged by the poet Thomas Sackville, 1st Earl of Dorset on the eve of Epiphany served on trenchers, large wooden plates, in sets of twelve, the underside of which were found epigrams or verses for the guests to share. The twelve verses were set by Maynard after the poems had already gained popularity.

== Works ==
- The XII wonders of the world – dedicated to Lady Joan Thynne
- The Book of Lute Music – dedicated to his patroness widow of Sir John II of Longleat.

== Editions ==
- The XII Wonders of the World; For the Violl de Gambo, the Lute & the Voyce edited by Edward Vernon Utterson 1842
- The XII wonders of the world: 1611 edited Anthony Rooley 1985 – 47 pages

== Recordings ==
- The XII wonders of the world: 1611 – complete – The Consort of Musicke dir. Anthony Rooley, L'Oiseau Lyre LP 1975, Australian Eloquence CD 2010.
- The Wonders of the world – eight of the twelve – Echo du Danube, Miriam Allan soprano, Rob Wyn Jones narrator, Accent 2007 CD.
