= Caus Castle =

12th-century castle in England built within an Iron Age hillfort

- Westbury, Shropshire in England
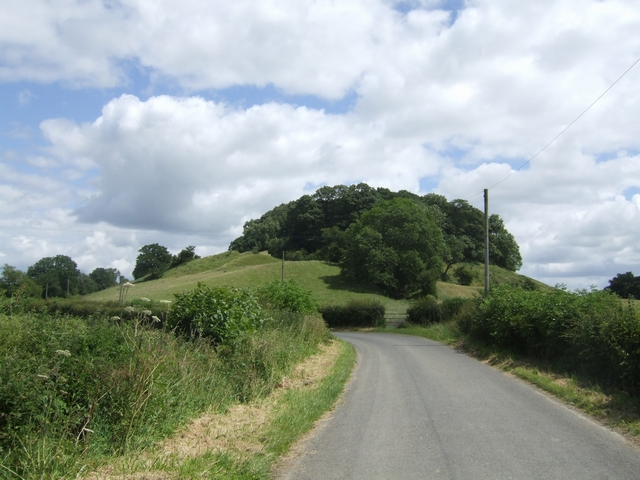

Site information
- Type: Hill fort and medieval castle

Location
- Location within Shropshire
- Coordinates: 52.662539°N 2.976543°W
- Grid reference: SJ340076

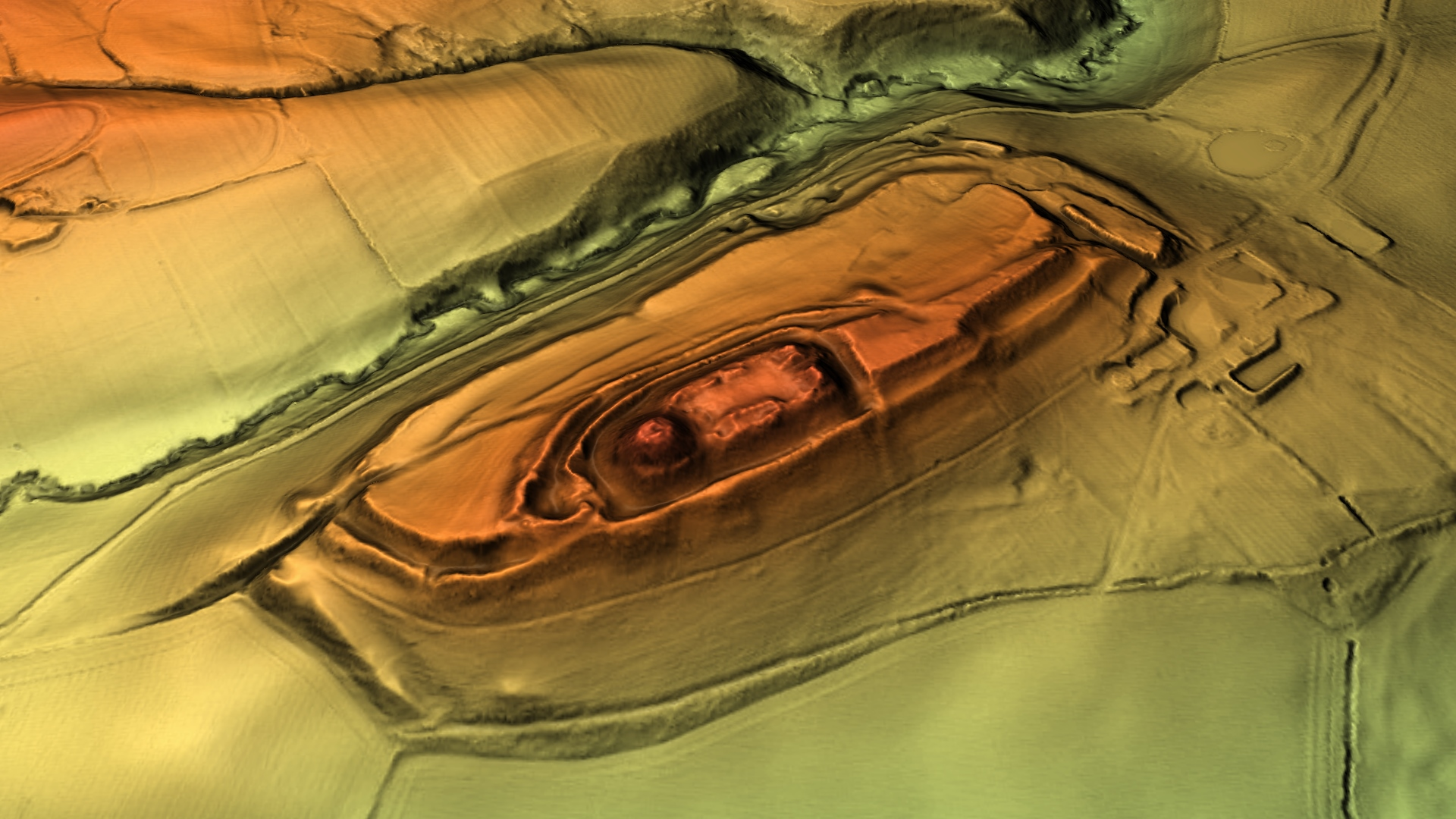
3D view of the digital terrain model

Caus Castle is a ruin of a hill fort and medieval castle in the civil parish of Westbury in the English county of Shropshire. It is situated up on the eastern foothills of the Long Mountain guarding the route from Shrewsbury, Shropshire to Montgomery, Powys, on the border between England and Wales. It was destroyed during the English Civil War and has been in ruins since.

== History ==
The early outer earthworks of the site are probably an Iron Age hillfort, while the later motte-and-bailey is of Norman construction.

Roger le Corbet (or Fitz Corbet) was granted several manors in Shropshire in 1069 by William the Conqueror as the Barony of Caus for his role in the Norman Conquest and invasion of England. They were named after his Normandy estate in the Pays de Caux, in France. The Corbets owed fealty to Roger de Montgomery, the first Earl of Shrewsbury to help control Welsh Marches with absolute control over their demesne. Caus Castle was built by Roger le Corbet in the late 11th century as a high motte with a very small summit on which stood a tower and a strongly defended inner bailey.

The castle was sufficiently important that the Crown took an interest in its maintenance. Henry II of England had it garrisoned in 1165.

The Welsh Prince Llywelyn the Great (1173-1240) is believed to have spent part of his childhood at Caus after his widowed mother Marared remarried into the Corbet family.

In 1198 Roger Corbet re-built the tower, keep and curtain wall in stone. During the late 12th century a town or borough was founded in the large outer bailey. A royal grant of 50 marks was made in 1263 towards further building work when D-shape towers were added to the curtain wall. The town contained a church of St Margaret as well as the castle's church of St Nicholas, and the names of two thoroughfares, Castle Street and St Margaret Street are recorded. On the death of Beatrice Corbet in 1347, Caus passed to the Earl of Stafford. At its height, the borough had 58 burgesses resident in 1349, a year coinciding with the arrival of the Black Death in England.

Caus (alternatively spelt Caux or Cause) was garrisoned by the Seneschal Griffith ap Ieuan ap Madoc ap Gwenwys against the rebellion of Owain Glyndŵr in the 15th century, but following calls from Welsh graduates in law and students in the University of Oxford he changed sides and supported Glyndŵr. As a result, his family lands and role at Caus Castle were forfeited in 1404, only to be restored by Henry V of England in 1419 after his sons Ieuan ap Griffith and Sir Gruffudd Vychan captured John Oldcastle for Lord Charlton of Powys.

On 10 August 1443, at Caus Castle Sir Gruffudd Vychan pierced with a lance the heart of his master, Sir Christopher Talbot (1419–1443), son of John Talbot, 1st Earl of Shrewsbury, and the champion tilter of England. He was outlawed, a reward of 500 marks (£166 6s 8d) offered for his capture, and his lands were passed to John Sutton, 1st Baron Dudley, as the death of the young knight was not regarded as an accident. The Earls and Barons Stafford rarely used the castle in the 15th and 16th centuries so that it was recorded in great decay in 1521, and had only two resident tenants in 1541. Henry Stafford, 1st Baron Stafford (fourth creation) recordedly died there in 1563 when he was buried at Worthen.

The castle was given as part of a marriage settlement to John Thynne (died 1604) and Joan (née Hayward), but Edward Stafford, 3rd Baron Stafford disputed the ownership. After he and Joan forcibly ejected Stafford from Caus Castle, in 1591, Joan lived at Caus whist John was based at Longleat, Wiltshire. The letters between them illustrate their partnership. Joan appears to have managed many aspects of their estate. She is also credited with defending Caus Castle, keeping guns and gunpowder in her bedroom.

A 15th century wooden screen from Caus Castle was later installed in Minsterley Hall, which was built by the Thynne family in 1581.

The castle was finally deserted after it was destroyed during the English Civil War after falling as a minor Royalist garrison in June 1645.

However, Katherine Lowther is said to have been born in Caus Castle in 1653 into the Thynne family. She was a daughter of Sir Henry Thynne, 1st Baronet and Mary Coventry, a daughter of Thomas Coventry, 1st Baron Coventry.

== Sources ==
- Barker, P.A. (1981). 'Caus Castle and Hawcocks Mount' Archaeological Journal Vol 138 p34
- Chitty, L. F. (1954). Caus Castle The Hundred-and-First Annual Meeting: Programme, CAA p19-21
- Williams G. (1998). 'Sir Gruffydd Fychan (?-1447)' Montgomeryshire Collections Vol 86, p17-28
