= Earl of Castlehaven =

Earldom of Castlehaven
- Arms of Tuchet: Ermine, a chevron gules
- Creation date: 6 September 1616
- Created by: James I
- Peerage: Peerage of Ireland
- First holder: George Tuchet, 1st Earl of Castlehaven
- Last holder: John Tuchet, 8th Earl of Castlehaven
- Remainder to: Heirs male of the first earl's body lawfully begotten
- Subsidiary titles: Baron Audley of Hely; Baron Audley of Orier
- Extinction date: 22 April 1777
- Seat: Heighley Castle
- Motto: Je le tiens ("I hold it")

Earl of Castlehaven was a title in the Peerage of Ireland, created on 6 September 1616. It was held in conjunction with the Barony of Audley (created 1312 in the Peerage of England), the Barony of Audley of Orier (created with the earldom in the Peerage of Ireland), and the Barony of Audley of Hely (created for the third Earl in 1633, in the Peerage of England).

Upon the attainder and execution of the second earl for sodomy, under the Buggery Act 1533 in 1631, he forfeited his English peerage, but not his Irish titles; this was because his English barony of Audley had been created for heirs general, but his Irish earldom and barony was an entailed honour protected by statute De Donis. His son, the third earl, was created Baron Audley of Hely on 3 June 1633 by letters patent, with the precedence of his grandfather, in an attempt to restore to him the original Barony of Audley. However, this was deemed insufficient to do so; a bill was passed in Parliament in 1678 which allowed him to inherit the original Barony despite the attainder. Within months he was barred from the House of Lords as a Roman Catholic under the Second Test Act.

With the death of the eighth earl, the Earldom of Castlehaven and the Baronies of Audley of Hely and Audley of Orier became extinct. The Barony of Audley created by writ of 1312 devolved upon his nephew, George Thicknesse, 19th Baron Audley.

== Earls of Castlehaven (1616) ==
- George Tuchet, 1st Earl of Castlehaven (1551–1617)
- Mervyn Tuchet, 2nd Earl of Castlehaven (1593–1631)
- James Tuchet, 3rd Earl of Castlehaven (c. 1617–1684)
- Mervyn Tuchet, 4th Earl of Castlehaven (died 1686)
- James Tuchet, 5th Earl of Castlehaven (died 1700)
- James Tuchet, 6th Earl of Castlehaven (died 1740)
- James Tuchet, 7th Earl of Castlehaven (1723–1769)
- John Tuchet, 8th Earl of Castlehaven (1724–1777)
