= George Thicknesse =

English schoolmaster

- Born: 1714
- Died: 18 December 1790 (aged 75–76)
- Occupation: Schoolmaster

George Thicknesse (1714 – 18 December 1790) was an English schoolmaster.

== Biography ==
Thicknesse was the third son of John Thicknesse, rector of Farthinghoe in Northamptonshire. He was born in 1714. His mother, Joyce Blencowe, was niece of Sir John Blencowe. Philip Thicknesse, lieutenant-governor of Landguard Fort, was a younger brother. George Thicknesse entered Winchester College in 1726. In 1737 he was appointed chaplain (third master) of St. Paul's school, in 1745 surmaster, and in 1748 high master. The school, which had been declining in his predecessor's time, flourished under his rule. Philip Francis, the reputed author of ‘Junius,’ was one of his scholars. In 1759 he suffered for a time from mental derangement (Gent. Mag. 1814, ii. 629), but did not retire from his office till 1769, when the governors of St. Paul's awarded him a pension of 100l. a year, and requested him to name his successor.

Thicknesse, on his retirement, resided with an old schoolfellow, William Holbech, at Arlescote, near Warmington, Northamptonshire, till the death of the latter in 1771. He himself died, unmarried, on 18 December 1790, and was buried on the north side of Warmington churchyard, in accordance with somewhat singular directions which he had given (ib. p. 412). A marble bust of him by John Hickey, with an inscription, the joint work of Sir Philip Francis and Edmund Burke, was placed in St. Paul's school by his pupils in 1792. The inscription is no longer extant (Notes and Queries, 8th ser. ix. 148).
