= Touche =

Touché or Touche may refer to:

== Sports ==
- Touché (fencing), French for "touched", a term used to acknowledge a hit

== Arts and entertainment ==
- Touché (Hush album), by Australian band Hush, 1977
- Touché (Ryan Stout album), by comedian Ryan Stout, 2011
- Touché (band), a German boy band
- "Touché" (Godsmack song), 2004
- Touché (Sarah song), 2023
- Touché: The Adventures of the Fifth Musketeer, a 1995 video game
- Touché Turtle, a cartoon character

== People ==
- Touche (surname), including a list of people with the name
- DJ Touche, real name Theo Keating, also known as Fake Blood, a British DJ, musician and record producer

== See also ==
- Touch (disambiguation)
- Haute Touche Zoological Park, Obterre, France
- Touchet
- Touche pas à mon poste !, French talk show
