= Gruffudd Vychan =

Welsh knight (c. 1395 – 1447)

Sir Gruffudd Vychan (c. 1395 – 1447), also spelt in English sources as Griffith Vaughan, was a Welsh knight who supported the rebellion of Prince Owain Glyndŵr against the English, and captured the Lollard John Oldcastle, who was later immortalized by Shakespeare as John Falstaff. He was finally executed after the murder of Sir Christopher Talbot, son of John Talbot, 1st Earl of Shrewsbury.

== Family ==
Lord of Burgedin, Treflydan, Garth and Gearfawr, Vychan was the second son of Gruffudd ap Ieuan ap Madoc ap Wenwys by Maud, daughter of Griffri ap Rhys Fongam.

The Gwenwys clan traced its ancestry from King Brochwel Ysgithrog through descent from Elisedd ap Cyngen, the eldest son of the last King of Powys, from whom they inherited their lands and titles. Their principal houses lay in the parish of Guilsfield, in the commote of Ystrad Marchell. The name is variously spelt Gruffudd Vychan, Griffith Vaughan, or Gruffydd Fychan: Gruffudd Fychan is the standard orthography in Welsh.

Gruffudd married twice, first to Margaret (Margred), daughter of Madoc of Hope (or Hob). They had two sons, David Lloyd and Cadwaladr. His second wife was also known as Margaret (Margred), daughter of Griffith ap Jenkin Broughten, by whom he had a third son, Reinallt.

== The Glyndŵr rebellion ==
Griffith ap Ieuan ap Madoc ap Gwenwys was appointed Seneschal of Caus Castle by Sir Hugh Stafford, Lord of Caus, to defend it against the rebellion of Prince Owain Glyndŵr in the 15th century. Following calls from Welsh graduates in law and students in the University of Oxford, he and his two sons, Ieuan and Griffith, changed sides and supported Glyndŵr. As a result, his family's lands and role at Caus Castle were forfeited in 1404.

== Capture of Sir John Oldcastle ==
The family honours were reaffirmed as a result of his role in the capture of the renegade Lord Cobham in November 1417. The reward for his capture was awarded to the Lord of Powys, but he died before receiving it, though a portion was paid to his widow in 1422. The principal agents in the capture were four of the tenants of the lord of Powys, Ieuan and Griffith, sons of Gruffudd ap Ieuan, being two of them.

By a charter dated at Mathrafal, 6 July 1419, Sir Edward de Cherleton pardoned the murders and felonies committed by them on the occasion. At Shrewsbury, 4 March 1420, in the presence of Henry V and of Humphrey, Duke of Gloucester, the four acknowledged satisfaction by the Lord of Powys for their portion of the reward for the capture of Oldcastle. On 10 March 1420, the lordship of Broniarth was constituted a mesne manor in favour of Ieuan and Sir Griffith Vaughan, empowering the brothers to hold tri-weekly courts.

== A knight banneret at Agincourt? ==
There is a persistent tradition that Gruffudd Vychan was in the band of Welshmen who are said to have saved the life of King Henry V when he rushed to rescue his brother, Humphrey, Duke of Gloucester, at the Battle of Agincourt, 1415. The belief grew that he, like Dafydd Gam, Roger Vaughan, and others, was knighted on the field. These knights are not recorded in Shaw's Knights of England. If Gruffudd Vychan was of age he could well have been at Agincourt, for two of his territorial lords, John Grey, 1st Earl of Tankerville, son-in-law of Sir Edward de Cherleton, Lord of Powis, and Sir Hugh Stafford, Lord of Caus, were in that campaign, in the retinue of Humphrey, Duke of Gloucester. The view that he was the "Griffin Fordet" of a French chronicle of Agincourt must be rejected.

A Welsh poet, in a cywydd, wrote that Gruffudd Vaughan was made an esquire in London and knighted in a town beyond Rouen in France. It may be gathered that his promotion was largely due to the patronage of Duke Humphrey after Sir John Grey fell at the Battle of Baugé in March 1421, and Sir Gruffydd arranged for the body to be returned to Welshpool for an impressive funeral.

He was styled knight in the poem and was probably knighted by Henry VI after the death of Henry V in 1422 in recognition of his valour as a leading captain in the King's service at home in Powis, in England, and the field in France – maybe after Pontoise fell in 1441.

== Later life and execution ==
This was still a time when any discussion of Welsh independence or pretensions of royal title were extremely dangerous occupations.

However, by virtue of his ancient pedigree and local connections, as time went on, his rise in stature became increasingly apparent, and probably fearing a "second Glyndŵr," the local English lord allowed him no quarter.

On 10 August 1443, at Caus Castle, Sir Gruffydd pierced with a lance the heart of his master, Sir Christopher Talbot (1419–1443), son of John Talbot, 1st Earl of Shrewsbury, and the champion tilter of England. It is not known whether the blow was struck by accident or design. He was outlawed, and a reward of 500 marks (£333 6s 8d) was offered for his capture, as the death of the young knight was not regarded as an accident. For the next four years, Sir Gruffydd remained at large as an outlaw.

A year later, on 18 July 1444, his estates and those of his eldest son, Reynold, and nephew David Lloyd, were made over to John Sutton, 1st Baron Dudley. In April 1447, a general pardon was issued for those involved in the affair, but Sir Gruffydd was excluded from it.

Vychan was summarily executed by Henry Grey, 2nd Earl of Tankerville at Powis Castle in 1447, in violation of a safe conduct given. It is not known whether Vychan was suspected of Yorkist sympathies, whether it was in retribution for the death of Sir Christopher Talbot at Sir Gruffydd's hand, or whether he wished to eliminate Vychan's claim to Powis.

The Welsh poets were infuriated by Grey's treachery, and the indignant elegies of Lewis Glyn Cothi and Dafydd Llwyd ap Llywelyn ap Gruffudd (Dafydd Llwyd o Fathafarn) have survived. In the second of these, Dafydd Llwyd o Fathafarn expresses the deep sense of anger and loss in Powys at the taking of his life:

For the man with the golden collar whom I loved best, the breast is pining.
If Gruffudd Fychan, thou art alive and well why dost thou not kindle a fire?
If thou art, tall hero, unrecorded killed, may God avenge thy beauteous brow.
No man with wrathful hand could have slain thee unless he were a fiend inspired with jealousy.
My friend, I did not counsel reliance on the sign-manual of a Saxon!
Miserable remnants of Troy! For ages have we known the perfidy of the Saxons, were it not for our madness!
The head of the Prince of Wales in Buellt;
The head of Gruffudd Fychan (whose long ruddy lance was like the lightning) the firm support of his country.
A Knight with a brave hero's arm they cut off! A head that would not be sold for pounds:
A holy head like John (the baptist); a fair head even when it was made a present of;
A head that long gave law to Powys, a sacred head, the head of an illustrious prince.
A beautiful head until he was betrayed. Was not the 'safe conduct' execrable?
When this head was severed in violence it was struck off by the double tongued Earl,
Harry Grey! Long may he hang

== Descendants ==
Gruffudd was succeeded by his children David Lloyd (who inherited Garth), Cadwaladr, Reinallt (Reginald) Vychan, Gwenhwyvar, Catherine, Anne, and Margaret. Reinallt and David Lloyd received the royal pardon on 21 December 1448.

On David Lloyd's death in 1497, his wide estates were divided between the children of his two marriages, who founded numerous families of Montgomeryshire Lloyds. David Lloyd's son, Humphr(e)y Lloyd, became the first High Sheriff of Montgomeryshire in 1541.

Reinallt, or Reginald, was the ancestor of the Wynnes and Myttons of Garth and the Derwes family.

== Sources ==
- Shaw, William A. The Knights of England: A Complete Record from the Earliest Time 2v. London: Central Chancery, 1906 (Baltimore: Genealogical Publishing Co., 1970)
- Williams, G. (1998). Sir Gruffydd Fychan (?–1447) Montgomeryshire Collections Vol 86, pp. 17–28
