= Touche (surname) =

Touche is a surname related Touchet and Touchette.

== People with the surname ==
- George Touche (1861–1935), Scottish banker, founder of Touche accountancy firm (later Deloitte & Touche)
- Sir Gordon Touche, 1st Baronet (1895–1972), British politician
- Touche baronets, related to above-mentioned George and Gordon

== See also ==
- Touche (disambiguation)
