= George Anselm Touchet =

English Roman Catholic monk

Anselm; OSB
- Chaplain to the Queen; Catherine of Braganza
- Installed: 1671
- Term ended: 1678

Orders
- Ordination: 1643

Personal details
- Born: George Touchet Stalbridge, Dorset, England
- Died: c. 1689
- Denomination: Roman Catholic
- Parents: Mervyn Tuchet; Elizabeth Brydges

George Anselm Touchet, also spelt Tuchet, (born after 1618 – died 1689 or earlier) was an English Roman Catholic monk who was chaplain of Catherine of Braganza, consort of Charles II, from 1671 till his banishment in 1675.

The second son of Mervyn Tuchet, 2nd Earl of Castlehaven, by his marriage to Elizabeth Barnham, and a younger brother of James Tuchet, 3rd Earl of Castlehaven, Touchet began life as George Tuchet in Stalbridge, Dorset. In 1631, his father was convicted and executed for various sexual crimes, including rape and sodomy. In 1643 Touchet became a Benedictine at St Gregory's, Douai, and was clothed a monk under the name of Anselm. After the Restoration of the Stuarts he was made chaplain to Queen Catherine, with an apartment at St James's Palace and subsequently another at Somerset House, and with an allowance of £100 a year.

Touchet's Historical collections, a work of Catholic controversy, appeared in 1674, and he was banished from England the following year. The 1678 private act of Parliament reversing his father's attainder, Baron Audley of Hely (Restoration of Honour) Act 1677 (29 & 30 Cha. 2. c. 17 Pr.), specifically excluded him from succeeding to his elder brother's peerages and estates, which in 1684 passed to their younger brother, Mervyn. An abridged version of his manuscript translation of a devotional work by the French mystic Constantine Barbanson (1581–1632) was published in 1928 as The Secret Paths of Divine Love.

== Works ==
- Historical collections out of several grave Protestant historians concerning the changes of religion and the strange confusions following from thence, 1674. Reissued 'with an Addition' in 1686.
- The Secret Paths of Divine Love, 1928. Tr. from French of Constantine Barbanson, abridged by a nun of Stanbrook Abbey, ed. with introduction by Dom Justin McCann
