= John Tuchet, 8th Earl of Castlehaven =

Irish noble

The Right Honourable John Tuchet
- Earl of Castlehaven
- Coat of arms
- Tenure: 1769–1777
- Predecessor: James Tuchet, 7th Earl of Castlehaven (as Earl of Castlehaven and Baron Audley)
- Successor: George Thicknesse, 19th Baron Audley (as Baron Audley)
- Born: 2 August 1724
- Died: 22 April 1777 (aged 52)
- Father: James Tuchet, 6th Earl of Castlehaven
- Mother: Hon. Elizabeth Arundell

John Talbot Tuchet, 8th Earl of Castlehaven (2 August 1724 – 22 April 1777) was the son of James Tuchet, 6th Earl of Castlehaven, and his wife, née Elizabeth Arundell. He succeeded his brother as Earl of Castlehaven and Baron Audley on 6 May 1769.

He died unmarried, at which time the Earldom of Castlehaven and two of its subsidiary titles (Baron Audley of Orier and Baron Audley of Hely) became extinct as the Irish earldom and baronies were entailed honours. The Barony of Audley created by writ of 1312 is deemed to have devolved upon his nephew, namely George Thicknesse (later Thicknesse-Touchet). George was the son of his sister Elizabeth, who had married Philip Thicknesse

Peerage of Ireland
Preceded by James Tuchet	Earl of Castlehaven; 1769–1777	Extinct
Peerage of England
Preceded by James Tuchet	Baron Audley; 1769–1777	Succeeded by George Thicknesse
