= Mary Thicknesse-Touchet, 22nd Baroness Audley =

Mary Thicknesse-Touchet, 22nd Baroness Audley (13 August 1858 – 27 May 1942).

Mary Thicknesse-Touchet was eldest daughter of George Edward Thicknesse-Touchet, 21st Baron Audley (1817–1872) and Emily Mitchell. She never married.

She obtained her title by writ on the death of her younger sister, Anne, on 17 May 1937. It had been in abeyance since the death of her father in 1872.

Mary Thicknesse-Touchet died on 27 May 1942. On her death her title passed by writ to her second cousin, Thomas Touchet-Jesson, 23rd Baron Audley (1913–1963).

Peerage of England
Preceded by George Edward Thicknesse-Touchet	Baron Audley; 1937 (by writ) –1942	Succeeded by Thomas Touchet-Jesson
