= George Edward Thicknesse-Touchet, 21st Baron Audley =

George Edward Thicknesse-Touchet, 21st Baron Audley (26 January 1817 – 18 April 1872).

George Edward Thicknesse-Touchet was the eldest son of George John Thicknesse-Touchet, 20th Baron Audley (1783–1837) and Anne Jane Donelly. He married twice: firstly on 16 April 1857 in Sydney, Australia Emily Mitchell, daughter of Sir Thomas Livingstone Mitchell; and secondly on 15 February 1868 in London, Margaret Anne Hudson (24 December 1802 – 22 August 1888). By his first wife he had two children, Mary and Emily.

Thicknesse-Touchet died on 18 April 1872 in Bad Homburg, Germany and was buried in Frankfurt. On his death his title went into abeyance until restored by writ to his eldest daughter, Mary Thicknesse-Touchet, 22nd Baroness Audley (1858–1942) on the death in 1937 of her younger sister.

Peerage of England
Preceded by George John Thicknesse-Touchet	Baron Audley; 1837–1872 (abeyant)	Succeeded by Mary Thicknesse-Touchet
