= Jacques Touchet =

French illustrator

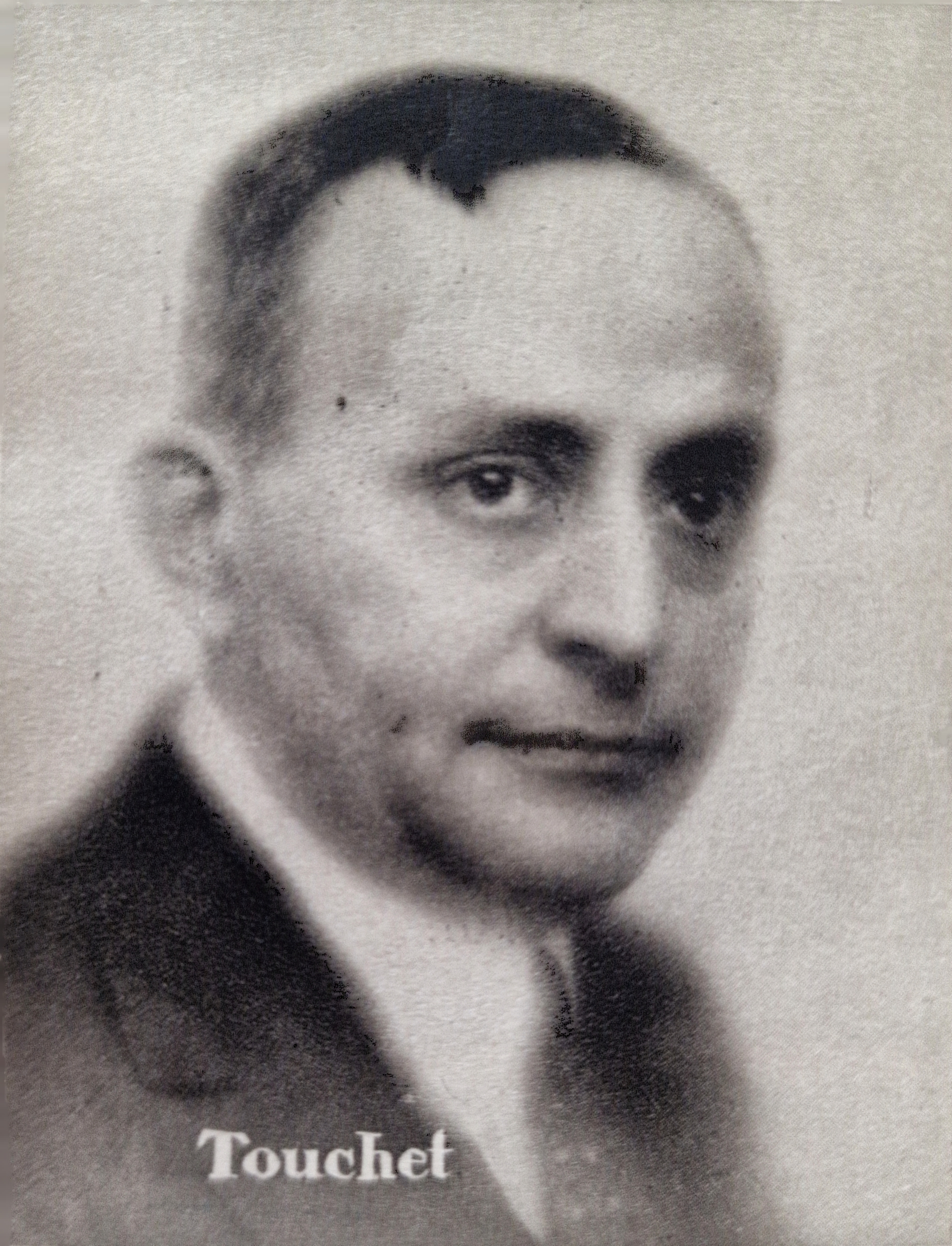
- Born: September 18, 1887; 6th Arrondissement of Paris
- Died: November 20, 1949 (62 years old); 7th arrondissement of Paris
- Resting place: Cemetery of Montparnasse
- Notable work: Croquis d'un Prisonnier de Guerre
- Children: Line Touchet

Jacques Touchet (18 September 1887 — 20 November 1949) was a French illustrator. His first book, Croquis d'un prisonnier de guerre (Sketch of a War Prisoner) was published in 1917. He illustrated numerous French books until his death.

== Biography ==
Jaques Touchet was born in Paris, France on 17 September 1887, to Narcisse Touchet, a department manager at Le Bon Marché, and Louise Marguerite Félicie Marlier.

He was a student of Paul Renouard and Louis Morin, and was an illustrator for the magazine L'Illustration.

In the First World War, he was deployed into the French Army and stationed in Thessaloniki in Greece. He produced several paintings and illustrations during this time.

== Publications ==
Title	Printer	Year
Croquis d'un prisonnier de guerre	Marty	1917
L'amour Vainqueur	L'édition	1921
Les petits métiers de Salonique	Laurent Vibert	1926
Merveilleuses histoires de Nasr'edinne	Kieffer	1926
Eloge de la folie	Kieffer	1926
Honorable partie de campagne	Bibliophiles de Papier	1927
Droits de l'homme et du citoyen	Kieffer	1927
Dictionnaire portatif et philosophique	Babou	1928
Le mariage de Panurge	Plique	1929
Les Rencontres de Monsieur de Bréot	Kieffer	1929
Voyages de Gulliver	Kra	1929–1930
Les Malheurs de Sophie	Piazza	1930
Les Contes de Perrault	Piazza	1930
Les cinquante judgements de Salomon ou les arrêts des bons juges	Kieffer	1930
L'oiseau Bleu	Piazza	1931
Contes de Courteline	Piazza	1931
Les quinze joies du mariage	Kieffer	1932
Histoire comique ou Voyage dans la lune	Les Bibliophiles de l'aéroclub de France	1932
Vie Anecdotique de Jean de la Fontaine	Briffaut	1933
La redoute des contrepèteries	Briffaut : Le coffret du bibliophile	1934 (numerous other editions)
Gargantua et Pantagruel	Aux éditions du Rameau d'Or	1935
LES PAPIERS POSTHUMES DU PICKWICK-CLUB	Aux éditions du Rameau d'Or	1937
L'Homme qui Voulut Etre Roi.	Librairie Delagrave	1937
Les aventures du Roi Pausole.	Rombaldi	1937
Nuances	Kieffer	1938
Les Vies des Dames galantes	Editions de la Belle Etoile	1938
Les aventures du roi Pausole	Piazza	1939
Contes des mille et une nuits	Editions de la belle étoile	1939
Des passions de l'âme	Kieffer	1939–1940
Contes de La Fontaine	Editions de la belle étoile	1941
Fables de La Fontaine	Editions de la belle étoile	1941
Lysistrata	Chamotin	1941
Tartarin de Tarascon	Aux éditions du Rameau d'Or	1942
La guerre des boutons	Editions du Nord	1942
Le capitaine fracasse	Aux éditions du Rameau d'Or	1943
Clochemerle	Editions du Nord	1943
Ces dames aux chapeaux verts	Editions du Nord	1943
Trente-deux fables de La Fontaine		1944
La Négresse blonde	Corti	1945
Don Quichotte	Aux éditions du Rameau d'Or	1945
La Farce de la Marmite	Chamotin	1946
Les héritiers Euffe	Editions du Nord	1947
Les mémoires de Casanova	Aux éditions du Rameau d'Or	1947
Knock	Jacques-Petit	1947
Sainte-Colline	Librairie de France	1947
Un Soir Quand on Est Seul	L'Edition Française Illustrée	1947
Thémidore ou mon histoire et celle de ma Maîtresse	Eryx	1948
Le paysan et la paysanne pervertis	Les éditions du Mouflon	1948
De tapioca à la grand'mère Dubrovna		1948
L'Heptaméron	André Vial	1949
Mémoires d'un petit artisan	Berger-Levrault	1949
Mémoires d'un petit comédien	Berger-Levrault	1949
Mémoires d'un petit tambour	Berger-Levrault	1949
La Muse gaillarde		1949
Vie et aventures de Salavin - Confessions de Minuit	Albert Guillot	1950
François Villon	Editions Rombaldi	1950
La rôtisserie de la Reine Pédauque	Aux Editions Terres Latines	1952
Un client sérieux	Grund	1947–1949
L'Ether Alpha	Librairie Hachette	1929
Les artistes du Livre	Babou	
LE MEDECIN MALGRE LUI	Innothera	
Les voix fantaisistes - La voix de l'actionnaire	Editions Artistiques des Laboratoires Denis	
Gens de France au labeur		
L'histoire de France en chansons	Nouvelle Librairie Française	
