= John Tuchet, 8th Baron Audley =

English peer

The Right Honourable The Lord Audley
- Arms of Tuchet: Ermine, a chevron gules

Personal details
- Born: John Tuchet c. 1483
- Died: before 20 January 1557/8
- Spouse: Mary Griffin
- Children: George Tuchet
- Parent: James Tuchet; Margaret Dayrell

John Tuchet, 8th Baron Audley, 5th Baron Tuchet (c. 1483 – before 20 January 1558) was an English peer.

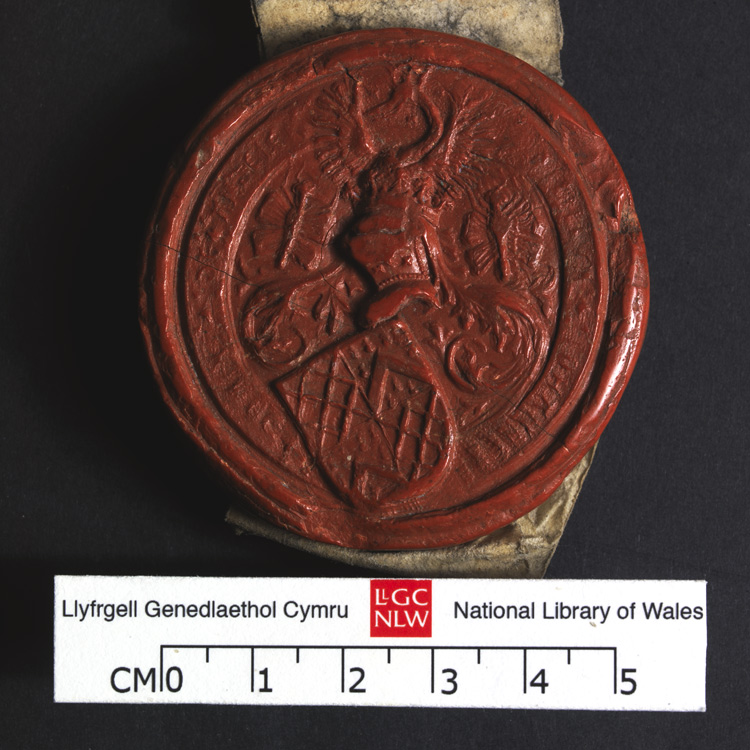
Coat of arms of John Tuchet. 28 September 1522. NLW Bronwydd 7012

== Life ==
John Tuchet was the son of Sir James Tuchet, 7th Baron Audley (c. 1463–1497) by his first wife, Margaret Dayrell, the daughter of Richard Dayrell, sub-treasurer of England and Margaret Beaufort, Countess of Stafford, widow of Humphrey Stafford, styled Earl of Stafford, and daughter and coheir of Edmund Beaufort, 2nd Duke of Somerset. He acquired his titles by writ in 1512 after they had been forfeited to his father in 1497 for taking part in the Cornish Rebellion. He was restored as Lord Audley in name, blood, title and estate by an act of restitution in 1512. The restitution of his title cost him 6,500 marks, to be paid in yearly instalments of 250 marks.

In 1513 he was appointed to lead the defence of Hampshire against an expected French invasion; once that threat had was over, he joined the king in France with a retinue of 123 footmen. He was one of only two barons knighted by the king for his service in France.. In 1520 was still struggling to pay his debt to the Crown, which may explain his failure to attend the Field of the Cloth of Gold, although he is not known to have attended any of the great state occasions of Henry VIII's reign. In 1529 he was named as one of the triers of petitions from Gascony in the House of Lords, a mark of distinction although the role had no practical purpose.

In 1540 he sought Thomas Cromwell's help in obtaining Athelney Abbey, Somerset following its dissolution, but obtained only a lease and a life annuity of £20.

== Family ==
Restitution of John Audley Act 1513
- Act of Parliament
- Parliament of England
- Long title: The Restitucion of John Audeley.
- Citation: 5 Hen. 8. c. 15 (Note: This is the citation in The Statutes of the Realm.); 5 Hen. 8. c. 7 Pr. (Note: This is the citation in The Statutes at Large.)
- Territorial extent: England and Wales

Dates
- Royal assent: 4 March 1514
- Commencement: 4 February 1512 (Note: Start of session.)
- Repealed: 16 June 1977
Other legislation
Repealed by	Statute Law (Repeals) Act 1977

Status: Repealed

Text of statute as originally enacted

He married Mary Griffin, daughter of John Griffin, 9th Baron of Latimer of Braybrook.

He died before 20 January 1558 and was succeeded by his only son, George Tuchet, 9th Baron Audley (died 1560).

== Bibliography ==
- Arthurson, Ian (2004). "Tuchet, James, seventh Baron Audley (c.1463–1497)". Oxford Dictionary of National Biography (online ed.). Oxford University Press. doi:10.1093/ref:odnb/27576. (Subscription, Wikipedia Library access or UK public library membership required.)
- Burke, John (1831). A General and Heraldic Dictionary of the Peerages of England, Ireland and Scotland, Extinct, Dormant and in Abeyance. London: Henry Colburn and Richard Bentley. p. 73. "sir richard page."
- Cokayne, George Edward (1910). The Complete Peerage, edited by Vicary Gibbs. Vol. I. London: St Catherine Press. pp. 341–2.
- Foster, Joseph (1886). The Royal Lineage of Our Noble and Gentle Families. London. p. 88.
- Lee, Sidney, ed. (1899). "Touchet, James, seventh Baron Audley (1465?-1497)". Dictionary of National Biography. Vol. 57. London: Smith, Elder & Co. p. 76-7.

Peerage of England
Preceded by James Tuchet	Baron Tuchet; 1512 - c. 1557	Succeeded by George Tuchet
Preceded by James Tuchet	Baron Audley; 1512 - c. 1557	Succeeded by George Tuchet
