= Baron Audley =

Title in the Peerage of England

Barony of Audley
- Arms borne by the Tuchet Barons Audley: Quarterly: 1st and 4th: Ermine, a chevron gules (Tuchet); 2nd and 3rd: Gules, a fret or (Audley)
- Creation date: 8 January 1313
- Created by: Edward II
- Peerage: Peerage of England
- First holder: Nicholas Audley, 1st Baron Audley
- Last holder: Richard Michael Thomas Souter, 25th Baron Audley
- Heir apparent: Abeyant since 1997
- Remainder to: Heirs general
- Motto: Je le tiens ("I hold it")

Baron Audley is a title in the Peerage of England first created in 1313, by writ to the Parliament of England, for Sir Nicholas Audley of Heighley Castle, a member of the English Audley family of Staffordshire.

The third Baron, the last of the senior Audley line, died without issue in 1391, when the barony fell into abeyance; it was revived in 1408 for the descendants of his sister Joanne Audley, and her husband, Sir John Tuchet, KG (b. 1327); the 11th Baron Audley was created Earl of Castlehaven and his son, the 2nd Earl, was attainted of felony and executed, forfeiting the ancient English barony but not the Irish earldom. (The Castlehavens also held two other different baronies Audley of Orier (1616) and Audley of Hely (1633).) The titles were revived by Act of Parliament in 1678 for his son, James Tuchet, 3rd Earl of Castlehaven, devolving in the same line until the death of John Tuchet, 8th Earl of Castlehaven in 1777, when the earldom became extinct, and the Audley title passed to George Thicknesse-Tuchet as the 19th Baron Audley. The title has been abeyant since the death of Richard Souter, 25th Baron Audley in 1997, leaving three daughters.

The title of Baron Audley was created a second time on 20 November 1317, again by writ of summons, in favour of Sir Hugh Audley of Stratton Audley, grandson of James Audley of Audley (1220–1272). He married Lady Margaret de Clare, daughter of the Gilbert, Earl of Hertford and Gloucester (of 1218 creation, extinct 1314)). Audley was created Earl of Gloucester in 1337, but upon his death in 1347, the earldom became extinct and the barony fell dormant. His only daughter and heir married Ralph Stafford, 1st Earl of Stafford, thus de jure the barony devolved with the earldom of Stafford until 1521 when Edward Stafford, 3rd Duke of Buckingham was attainted of his noble titles.

== Barons Audley (1313) ==
- Nicholas Audley, 1st Baron Audley (c. 1289–1316)
- James Audley, 2nd Baron Audley (1312–1386)
- Nicholas Audley, 3rd Baron Audley (c. 1328–1391) (abeyant 1391)
- John Tuchet, 4th Baron Audley (1371–1408) (abeyance terminated 1408)
- James Tuchet, 5th Baron Audley (c. 1398–1459)
- John Tuchet, 6th Baron Audley (d. 1490)
- James Tuchet, 7th Baron Audley (c. 1463–1497) (forfeit 1497)
- John Tuchet, 8th Baron Audley (c. 1483–1558) (restored 1512)
- George Tuchet, 9th Baron Audley (d. 1560)
- Henry Tuchet, 10th Baron Audley (d. 1563)
- George Tuchet, 11th Baron Audley (1551–1617); later created 1st Earl of Castlehaven

== Earls of Castlehaven (I. 1616) ==
- George Tuchet, 1st Earl of Castlehaven, 11th Baron Audley (1551–1617)
- Mervyn Tuchet, 2nd Earl of Castlehaven, 12th Baron Audley (1593–1631) (forfeit 1631)
- James Tuchet, 3rd Earl of Castlehaven, 13th Baron Audley (c. 1617–1684) (restored 1678)
- Mervyn Tuchet, 4th Earl of Castlehaven, 14th Baron Audley (d. 1686)
- James Tuchet, 5th Earl of Castlehaven, 15th Baron Audley (d. 1700)
- James Tuchet, 6th Earl of Castlehaven, 16th Baron Audley (d. 1740)
- James Tuchet, 7th Earl of Castlehaven, 17th Baron Audley (1723–1769)
- John Tuchet, 8th Earl of Castlehaven, 18th Baron Audley (1724–1777)

== Barons Audley (1313; Reverted) ==
- George Thicknesse-Touchet, 19th Baron Audley (1758–1818)
- George John Thicknesse-Touchet, 20th Baron Audley (1783–1837)
- George Edward Thicknesse-Touchet, 21st Baron Audley (1817–1872) (abeyant 1872)
- Mary Thicknesse-Touchet, 22nd Baroness Audley (1858–1942) (abeyance terminated 1937)
- Thomas Percy Henry Touchet-Jesson, 23rd Baron Audley (1913–1963)
- Rosina Lois Veronica MacNamee, 24th Baroness Audley (1911–1973)
- Richard Michael Thomas Souter, 25th Baron Audley (1914–1997) (abeyant 1997)

Co-heiresses: The Hon. Patricia McKinnon (b. 1946), The Hon. Jennifer Carrington (b. 1948), and The Hon. Amanda Souter (b. 1958), daughters of the 25th Baron.

== Barons Audley (1317) ==
- Hugh de Audley, 1st Baron Audley (d. 1347); created 1st Earl of Gloucester in 1337.
- Margaret de Audley, suo jure 2nd Baroness Audley, married Ralph Stafford, 1st Earl of Stafford.
- Hugh de Stafford, 3rd Baron Audley
  - See Earl of Stafford and Duke of Buckingham.

== See also ==
- Audley, Staffordshire
- Baron Audley of Hely
- Baron Audley of Orier
- Baron Audley of Walden
- Baron Tuchet

=== Notes ===
- Cokayne, George Edward, The Complete Peerage of England, Scotland, Ireland, Great Britain and the United Kingdom, Extant, Extinct or Dormant, A. Sutton, Gloucester, 1982. [originally 13 volumes, published by The St. Catherine Press Ltd, London, England, from 1910–1959; reprinted in microprint: 13 vol. in 6, Gloucester: A. Sutton, 1982]
- Cokayne, George Edward, The Complete Peerage of England, Scotland, Ireland, Great Britain and the United Kingdom, Extant, Extinct or Dormant: Addenda and Corrigenda, Hammond, Peter W., Sutton Publishing, Ltd., Gloucestershire, England, 1998.
- Herrup, Cyntha B., A House in Gross Disorder: Sex, Law, and the 2nd Earl of Castlehaven, Oxford University Press, Oxford, 1999.
- Hesilrige, Arthur G. M. (1921). Debrett's Peerage and Titles of courtesy. London: London: Dean & son, limited. p. 79.
