= George Tuchet, 9th Baron Audley =

English peer

The Right Honourable The Lord Audley
- Arms of Tuchet: Ermine, a chevron gules

Personal details
- Born: George Tuchet
- Died: c. June 1560
- Resting place: St. Margaret's Church, London, England
- Spouses: Elizabeth Tuke; Joan Platt (m. 1560)
- Children: Henry Tuchet
- Parent: James Tuchet; Mary Griffin

George Tuchet, 9th Baron Audley, 6th Baron Tuchet (died June 1560) was an English peer.

George Tuchet was the son of John Tuchet, 8th Baron Audley.

He married twice:

1) Elizabeth Tuke, daughter of Sir Brian Tuke before 30 August 1538

- Henry Tuchet, 10th Baron Audley

2) Joan Platt, widow of St Andrew's in Eastcheap, at his Oratory in Cheshire on 23 January 1560 by licence granted by the bishop of London the day before.

He inherited his title by writ, taking his seat in the House of Lords on 20 January, 1558.

He died in June and was buried 2 July 1560 in St Margaret's Church, Westminster. Administration of his estate was granted to his widow.

Peerage of England
Preceded by John Tuchet	Baron Tuchet c. 1557 – 1560	Succeeded by Henry Tuchet
Preceded by John Tuchet	Baron Audley c. 1557 – 1560	Succeeded by Henry Tuchet
