= John Tuchet, 6th Baron Audley =

English politician

The Right Honourable The Lord Audley
- Arms of Tuchet: Ermine, a chevron gules

Lord High Treasurer
- In office 1484–1485
- Monarch: Richard III
- Preceded by: Sir John Wood
- Succeeded by: The Baron Dynham

Personal details
- Born: John Tuchet; 1423 Staffordshire, England
- Died: 26 September 1490 (aged 66–67)
- Resting place: Shere, Surrey, England
- Spouse: Ann Echingham
- Children: 7, including James
- Parents: James Tuchet; Margaret de Ros

Military service
- Allegiance: Edward IV
- Rank: Joint Commander
- Battles/wars: Battle of Mortimer's Cross; Battle of Barnet; Battle of Tewkesbury

John Tuchet, 6th Baron Audley, 3rd Baron Tuchet (1423 – 26 September 1490) was an English politician.

John Tuchet was the son of James Tuchet, 5th Baron Audley (c. 1398 - 1459). He married Ann Echyngham (daughter of Sir Thomas Echyngham (died 1444) and Margaret Knyvet, and widow of John Rogers of Bryanston), with whom he had seven children. He acquired his title by writ in 1459 on the death of his father.

In 1460 at Calais, then belonging to the English crown, he was taken prisoner by the Earl of Warwick whilst on a military expedition during the Wars of the Roses. He there met the future Edward IV and was persuaded to defect to the Yorkist cause and fought for Edward at the Battles of Mortimer's Cross (1461), Barnet (1471) and Tewkesbury (1471). He was subsequently invested by Edward in 1471 as a Privy Counsellor (PC). He received commissions of Array. He was joint commander of the Army and held the office of Master of the King's Dogs in 1471. He was present when King Edward bestowed the title of Earl of Winchester upon Louis Seigneur de la Gruthuyse in 1472.

Richard III appointed him Lord High Treasurer in December 1484, in succession to Sir John Wood.

John Tuchet died on 26 September 1490 and was buried at Shere, Surrey. He was succeeded by his eldest son, Sir James Tuchet, 7th Baron Audley (1463–1497). His wife Anne, who outlived him, was later buried at Bermondsey. Her will was written in 1497 and proved in 1498.

Peerage of England
Preceded by James Tuchet	Baron Tuchet; 1459–1490	Succeeded by James Tuchet
Preceded by James Tuchet	Baron Audley; 1459–1490	Succeeded by James Tuchet
Political offices
Preceded by Sir John Wood	Lord High Treasurer; 1484–1485	Succeeded by The Baron Dynham
