= Daniel Donne =

English jurist

Sir Daniel Donne (or Dunn) (died 1617) was an English jurist.

== Life ==
He was the son of Robert Donne and descended from John Dwnn of Radnorshire, was educated at Oxford University, where he was a member of All Souls College, and was admitted to the degree of B.C.L. 14 July 1572. Eight years later the higher degree was conferred on him, when he became Principal of New Inn Hall.

He entered the College of Advocates 22 January 1582, and in 1598 was appointed Dean of Arches and master of requests. In the following year he sat with Sir Julius Caesar and others on two commissions which were appointed to inquire into the grievances of Danish and French fishermen and merchants respectively. In 1601 he ruled in favour of Sir Thomas Thynne whose secret marriage was disputed by his mother Joan Thynne. He was also a member of the commission formed in 1601 with the object of framing measures for the suppression of piracy by English sailors; and as John Whitgift's vicar-general he sat with five bishops on special commissions at the provincial synod and at convocation. About this time he was made a master in chancery, and was one of nine civilians who drew up an argument in support of oaths ex officio in ecclesiastical courts.

In 1602 he was appointed commissioner, together with Ralph Eure, 3rd Baron Eure and Sir John Herbert, to confer at Bremen with commissioners sent by the King of Denmark concerning the feasibility of a treaty which should put an end to the frequent quarrels between Danish and English fishermen. On the successful termination of this mission Donne was rewarded with a knighthood. Shortly after the accession of James I he was placed on a commission under the Archbishop of Canterbury to inquire into heresies and offences against the marriage laws in the diocese of Winchester, with powers of summary jurisdiction, and he also attended the conference held at Hampton Court in reference to ecclesiastical courts. In the same year (1604), when the universities were empowered to send representatives to parliament, he was one of the first two elected by Oxford University, and he was reelected in 1614. A pension was in the following year granted to him by royal warrant.

The last commission on which Donne sat was that appointed in 1616 to conduct an examination on the marriage of Robert Carr, 1st Earl of Somerset. Donne published nothing, but in Letters from the Bodleian Library, 1813, ii. 207–21, is an account of William Aubrey, printed from a manuscript supposed to be in his writing. He had married one of Aubrey's six daughters, and had succeeded him in the headship of New Inn. He died 15 September 1617.
