= Thomas Touchet-Jesson, 23rd Baron Audley =

English aristocrat

The Right Honourable The Lord Audley

23rd Baron Audley
- Tenure: 27 May 1942 — 3 July 1963
- Born: Thomas Percy Henry Touchet-Jesson; 15 September 1913; Herefordshire, England
- Died: 3 July 1963 (aged 49); Granada, Spain
- Spouses: June Chaplin (m. 1952; div. 1957) Sarah Churchill (m. 1962)
- Father: Thomas Touchet Tuchet-Jesson
- Mother: Annie Rosina Hammacott-Osler
- Relatives: Winston Churchill (father-in-law)

Thomas Percy Henry Touchet-Jesson, 23rd Baron Audley MBE (15 September 1913 – 3 July 1963) was born in Herefordshire, England, to Thomas Touchet Tuchet-Jesson and Annie Rosina Hammacott-Osler and educated at Lancing College. He married twice, initially to June Isabel de Trafford née Chaplin, daughter of Lt.-Col Reginald Chaplin, whom he divorced in 1957. His second marriage, on 26 April 1962, was to Sarah Churchill, daughter of former Prime Minister Sir Winston Churchill and his wife Clementine.

He inherited the title of 23rd Baron Audley on 27 May 1942 by writ, succeeding his second cousin Mary Thicknesse-Touchet, 22nd Baroness Audley on her death. He died during an excursion in Granada, Spain, and was buried in the English Cemetery in Málaga. As he died childless on 3 July 1963, the title passed to his sister Rosina (1911–1973).

Peerage of England
| Preceded by Mary Thicknesse-Touchet | Baron Audley; 1942 (by writ) – 1963 | Succeeded by Rosina Lois Veronica MacNamee |
