= George Tuchet, 1st Earl of Castlehaven =

The Right Honourable The Baron Audley
- Arms of Tuchet: Ermine, a chevron gules

Member of Parliament
- In office 30 September 1566 – 5 April 1614

Personal details
- Born: George Tuchet c. 1551
- Died: 20 February 1617
- Spouses: Lucy Mervyn (before 1584) Elizabeth Noel (m. 1611)
- Children: Eleanor Tuchet; Mervyn Tuchet; Ferdinando Tuchet; Anne Tuchet; Elizabeth Tuchet; Maria Tuchet; Christian Tuchet
- Parent: Henry Tuchet; Elizabeth Sneyd

George Tuchet, 1st Earl of Castlehaven (c. 1551 – 1617), was the son of Henry Tuchet, 10th Baron Audley (died 1563) and his wife, née Elizabeth Sneyd.

== Career ==
He succeeded his father as 11th Baron Audley and 8th Baron Tuchet on 30 December 1563, and served in the Parliament of England from 30 September 1566 to 5 April 1614. He was a Fellow of Magdalen College, Oxford. He was Governor of Utrecht in the Netherlands, and Governor of Kells, County Meath, Ireland. He was wounded at the Battle of Kinsale, 24 December 1601. He resided primarily in Ireland and was summoned by writ to the Irish House of Lords on 11 March 1613/1614.

He was created 1st Baron Audley of Orier (County Armagh) and 1st Earl of Castlehaven (County Cork) on 6 September 1616 in the Peerage of Ireland.

== Marriages ==
Before 28 August 1584, he married Lucy Mervyn, who died before April 1610, only daughter of Sir James Marvyn (1529–1611) and his first wife Amy Clarke from Fonthill Gifford, Wiltshire.

They had seven children:

- Eleanor Tuchet (1590–1652), who married:
1. Sir John Davies, attorney of the king.
2. Sir Archibald Douglas 7th of Tilquhillie (died 1644).
- Mervyn (1593–1631)
- Sir Ferdinando Tuchet K.B., who married the widow of Sir John Rodney.
- Anne Tuchet, who married Edward Blount Esq.
- Elizabeth Tuchet, who married:
1. Sir John Stawell of Cothelstone, and had a son John Stawell.
2. Sir Thomas Griffin. In 1603 Griffin hosted Anne of Denmark at Dingley, and Elizabeth, Lady Griffin attended the queen's funeral in 1619.
- Maria Tuchet, who secretly married Sir Thomas Thynne of Longleat creating years of litigation.
- Christian Tuchet (c.1587 – before 1646), who married Sir Henry Mervyn, son of Sir James's distant cousin Edmund Esq, of Durford Abbey, Sussex. Adopted son and co-heir of her grandfather Sir James Marvyn. Henry, who was knighted in 1619, sold the Fonthill estate to his brother-in-law, Mervyn. They had at least two sons:
1. James Mervyn
2. Sir Audley Mervyn

On 29 August 1611, at St. Mary-le-Strand, Middlesex, he married his second wife, Elizabeth Noel (died 1644), the daughter of Sir Andrew Noel (died 1607) and his wife, née Mabel Harington. The couple had no children.

The administration of his will was granted to his daughter Eleanor, wife of Sir Archibald Douglas. He was succeeded as Earl of Castlehaven by his son, Mervyn. His widow married Sir Piers Crosby on 6 March 1618/19, and was living in 1644.

Peerage of Ireland
New creation	Earl of Castlehaven; 1616–1617	Succeeded by Mervyn Tuchet
New creation	Baron Audley of Orier; 1616–1617	Succeeded by Mervyn Tuchet
Peerage of England
Preceded by Henry Tuchet	Baron Tuchet; 1613–1617	Succeeded by Mervyn Tuchet
Preceded by Henry Tuchet	Baron Audley; 1613–1617	Succeeded by Mervyn Tuchet
