= James Tuchet, 7th Earl of Castlehaven =

Irish noble

James Tuchet, 7th Earl of Castlehaven (15 April 1723 – 6 May 1769) was an Irish noble. He was the son of James Tuchet, 6th Earl of Castlehaven and his wife, née Elizabeth Arundell.

He succeeded his father as Earl of Castlehaven and Baron Audley on 12 October 1740.

He was unmarried, and was succeeded on his death in 1769 by his brother, John. He owned much land and donated parts of the proceeds to the church.

Peerage of Ireland
Preceded by James Tuchet	Earl of Castlehaven; 1740–1769	Succeeded by John Tuchet
