= James Tuchet, 7th Baron Audley =

British nobleman (d. 1497)

The Right Honourable The Lord Audley
- Arms of Tuchet: Ermine, a chevron gules

Personal details
- Born: James Tuchet c. 1463
- Died: 28 June 1497 (aged 33–34) Tower of London, England
- Cause of death: Beheaded
- Resting place: Blackfriars, London, England
- Spouses: Margaret Darrell (m. 1483) Joan Bourchier (m. 1488)
- Children: John Tuchet (c. 1483–1557/8)
- Parents: John Tuchet; Anne Echingham

James Tuchet, 7th Baron Audley (c. 1463 – 28 June 1497) was a British nobleman and the only lord to fully join the Cornish rebellion of 1497 opposing the rule of Henry VII of England. He was a leader in the rebel army's march to the edge of London, and in its defeat at the Battle of Deptford Bridge. Captured on the battlefield, he was sentenced for treason and beheaded. His peerage was forfeited, but restored to his son in 1512.

== Birth, succession, marriages, and issue ==
Tuchet was born in Heleigh Castle, Staffordshire to John Tuchet, 6th Baron Audley and Anne Echingham. He succeeded to the title of 7th Lord Audley, of Heleigh on 26 September 1490.

About 1483 he married Margaret Darrell, the daughter of Richard Darrell of Littlecote, Wiltshire by Margaret Beaufort, Countess of Stafford, widow of Humphrey Stafford, styled Earl of Stafford, and daughter and coheir of Edmund Beaufort, 2nd Duke of Somerset, by whom he had a son and heir, John Tuchet, 8th Baron Audley (c. 1483 – 20 January 1557/8).

Audley married secondly, about Michaelmas 1488, Joan Bourchier (died 3 March 1532), daughter of Fulk Bourchier, 10th Baron FitzWarin, and Elizabeth Dynham.

== Roots of disaffection ==
James Tuchet's father, John, the 6th Baron Audley, had joined the Yorkist side in the Wars of the Roses, and prospered under both King Edward IV and King Richard III, becoming Lord High Treasurer under the latter. James himself had, as a child, been made a Knight Bachelor by Edward IV when the latter's young son was created Prince of Wales. But under Henry VII, who overthrew the Yorkist dynasty of kings, the Tuchets were out of favour. Compared with other nobility, the family's landed wealth was small. Nevertheless, having succeeding to the Audley barony on the death of his father, on 26 September 1490, James Tuchet was called to join King Henry's expeditionary force against the French in 1492. The Siege of Boulogne resulted in a favourable treaty for Henry, but the expedition was probably personally costly for James.

Audley was summoned to attend sessions of Parliament from 1492. In 1496 he was compelled to contribute £200 as part of a bond guaranteeing the loyalty of another Yorkist, the Marquess of Dorset. In early 1497, King Henry levied heavy taxes to raise an army against the Scots and the Yorkist rebellion of the pretender Perkin Warbeck. Audley objected to the subsidy granted in Parliament. At home it was his role to collect taxes, and at the same time he was ordered to provide 100 men for Henry's army. When a new uprising began in Cornwall later that year, the rebels’ grievances evidently accorded with Audley's own. Francis Bacon (writing 125 years later) stated that his character was “unquiet and popular and aspiring to ruin”. Twentieth-century historian A. L. Rowse further surmised that Audley "cherished some disappointment that his services had not been better rewarded by the king".

== Cornish rebellion of 1497 ==
The rebel army from Cornwall was led by a blacksmith, Michael Joseph (known as An Gof), and a lawyer, Thomas Flamank. Audley met it when it reached Wells in Somerset. It seems Audley had already been in correspondence with An Gof and Flamank. Now, as a nobleman with military experience, he was acclaimed by the rebels as their commander. His exact qualities in this role are unclear but it was to turn out that he failed to provide a sound strategy or create a unified sense of purpose, and militarily he led the army only to defeat.

The force approached London via Salisbury and Winchester, and then skirted to the south, via Guildford, evidently in the hope of gaining popular support in Kent. No such uprising materialised, however. Reaching Blackheath near Deptford, south-east London, they were opposed by an army of King Henry's under Lord Daubeny and the Earl of Oxford. Many of the rebels were dismayed and wanted to submit themselves to the king. Reportedly it was An Gof (not Audley) who insisted on fighting. After desertions, Audley commanded a greatly outnumbered army against better-equipped opposition. The rebels were soundly defeated in the ensuing Battle of Deptford Bridge on Saturday 17 June 1497.

Audley was captured on the battlefield. Like An Gof and Flamank he was imprisoned in the Tower of London; the three were examined by the King in Council in the Tower on Monday 19 June. A week later, An Gof and Flamank were tried and, the following day, executed by hanging & beheading. Audley, as a nobleman, was instead taken to Westminster to be sentenced by the office of the Earl Marshal. Being condemned to death, he spent the night in Newgate Gaol. On Wednesday 28 June 1497, he was transported to Tower Hill on display with his coat of arms painted on paper upside-down and torn, and there beheaded. His head was stuck on London Bridge and his body was buried at Blackfriars.

Audley's lands were confiscated, later to be returned to his son John in 1533. The manor of Honybere was granted for life to Sir John Arundell, for the latter's service against the rebels. The Audley title was forfeit but was restored to John Tuchet in 1512.

== Notes ==
Peerage of England
Preceded by John Tuchet	Baron Audley; 1490–1497 (forfeit)	Succeeded by John Tuchet
