= George Thicknesse, 19th Baron Audley =

English peer

George Thicknesse, later Thicknesse-Touchet, 19th Baron Audley (4 February 1757 – 24 August 1818) was an English peer.

George Thicknesse-Touchet was the son of Captain Philip Thicknesse and Lady Elizabeth Tuchet, daughter of James Tuchet, 6th Earl of Castlehaven. Upon the deaths of his mother's two brothers, the Earldom became extinct, but the barony passed in the female line. He gained the rank of ensign in the 2nd (The Queen's Royal) Regiment of Foot.

He married, Elizabeth Delaval, daughter of Sir John Hussey Delaval, 1st Baron Delaval of Seaton Delaval and Susannah Robinson, on 21 May 1781 in Hanover Square, Mayfair, London, England. Later he married Augusta Henrietta Catherina Boisdaune, daughter of Rev. André Boisdaune and Elizabeth Strode, on 2 May 1792.

Thicknesse-Touchet died in Sandridge Lodge, near Melksham, Wiltshire and was buried in Melksham. He was succeeded by his eldest surviving son, George Thicknesse-Touchet (1781–1837). His second son John was killed at the battle of Copenhagen in 1801.

Peerage of England
Preceded by John Tuchet	Baron Audley; 1777–1818	Succeeded by George Thicknesse-Touchet
