= James Tuchet, 3rd Earl of Castlehaven =

Irish nobleman (c. 1612–1684)

The Right Honourable; The Earl of Castlehaven
- The 3rd Earl of Castlehaven
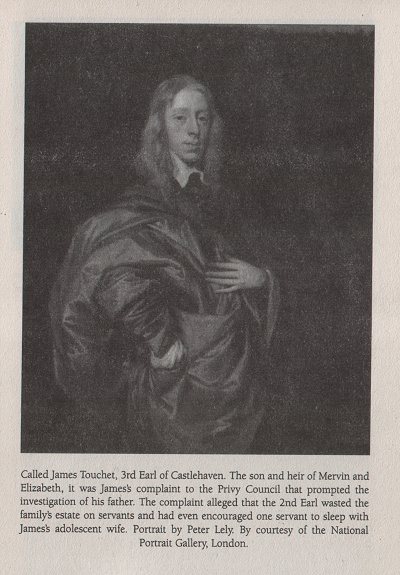
- Other names: Baron Audley of Orier
- Known for: Wars of the Three Kingdoms
- Born: c. 1612
- Died: 11 October 1684; Kilcash Castle, County Tipperary, Ireland
- Spouses: Elizabeth Brydges (died 1678); Elizabeth Graves (m. 1679)
- Parents: Mervyn Tuchet; Elizabeth Barnham

James Tuchet, 3rd Earl of Castlehaven (c. 1612 – 11 October 1684) was the son of Mervyn Tuchet, 2nd Earl of Castlehaven and his first wife, Elizabeth Barnham (1592 – c. 1622). Castlehaven played a prominent role in the Wars of the Three Kingdoms that took place in the middle of the 17th century, and was particularly active in the conflicts in Ireland at this time.

== Titles ==
He succeeded to the Irish earldom of Castlehaven and Baron Audley of Orier on 14 May 1631, when his father was attainted and beheaded. Most of his estates in England were taken over by others.

Baron Audley of Hely (Restoration of Honour) Act 1677
- Act of Parliament
- Parliament of England
- Long title: An Act for restoring the Honour of Baron Audley, of Hely, to James Lord Audley, and others herein mentioned.
- Citation: 29 & 30 Cha. 2. c. 17 Pr.
- Territorial extent: England and Wales

Dates
- Royal assent: 13 May 1678

Status: Current legislation

He was created Baron Audley of Hely with remainder "to his heirs forever" on 3 June 1633, with the place and precedency of George, his grandfather, formerly Baron Audley, in an effort to nullify his father's attainder. However, this was considered insufficient, legally, until the Baron Audley of Hely (Restoration of Honour) Act 1677 (29 & 30 Cha. 2. c. 17 Pr.) was passed by Parliament in 1678 allowing him to inherit the original Barony of Audley.

== War in Ireland ==
Castlehaven was involved in the defence of Ireland during the Confederate Wars of the 1640s and in the subsequent Cromwellian invasion. During the outbreak of the Irish uprising in 1641–42, Castlehaven volunteered to help suppress the Irish rebels, but because he was a Catholic he was not trusted to take command. Shortly afterwards, he was arrested and detained at Dublin Castle. Fearing that he would meet the same fate as the Earl of Strafford, Tuchet manage to escape 27 September, with the help of a friend and fled south into the Wicklow Mountains. His intention was 'to gain a passage by Wexford into France, and from thence into England;’ but coming to Kilkenny, the headquarters of the confederate Catholics, he was persuaded to accept a command in the army, and was appointed general of horse under Sir Thomas Preston, 1st Viscount Tara. It was believed among the northern Irish that his escape was a contrivance on the part of the Earl of Ormonde 'to work an understanding' between him and his kindred in rebellion, Castlehaven being related to him through the marriage of his sister with Edmund Roe Butler.

Even though he considered himself English, he was appointed a member of the 25-strong Supreme council of the Confederation of Kilkenny. In 1644 the Irish Confederate Supreme Council decided to vote for Castlehaven as the commander of a 6,000-strong expedition force in a push against the Ulster-Scottish army under Robert Monro. The campaign under Castlehaven proved indecisive, the large army being mostly used to defend the stronghold of Charlemont. Historians generally consider the expedition to have been a wasted opportunity: as a result of this, Owen Roe O'Neill considered Castlehaven to be incompetent and Thomas Preston also developed a dislike of him. (Castlehaven somewhat unconvincingly later blamed O'Neill for the failure of the expedition). However, Castlehaven was not entirely lacking in military ability. Apart from Owen Roe O'Neill, he proved to be the only Irish Confederate commander capable of winning conventional set-piece battles. In 1643 he surprised and routed hundreds of Inchiquin's men in county Cork at the battle of Cloughleagh. In 1650 he won a second small (though inconsequential) victory over an English Parliamentarian force during the battle of Tecroghan with some aid from Ulick Burke. The great weakness of Castlehaven was that he was largely an amateur, lacking the patience to conduct sieges and somewhat touchy- it is said that some referred to him as Tiarna Beag or 'Little Lord.' The anonymous author of the Aphorismical Discovery, a contemporary account of events during the Confederate wars in Ireland, contemptuously referred to Castlehaven as the 'pigmeyan Goliath of Clanricarde.'

== Later years ==
In 1647 he, like many other Catholic nobles, moved to France and was present at Prince Rupert's siege of Landrécy, the capital of Hainault. He went back to Ireland, after seeing the Prince of Wales in Paris, to hold several commands in Leinster, Munster, and Clare but was unable to counter the actions of Cromwell and his son-in-law, Ireton. He was able to return to the continent in April 1652 to further his military career serving Prince de Condé in the Fronde, Charles II, and the Spanish Crown. He participated in the battles of Rocroy, Cambrai, Seneffe, Maestricht, Charleroi and Mons

Castlehaven wrote his memoirs in 1681 in response to the hysteria of the Popish Plot. Like all Catholic peers, he had been barred from the House of Lords (where he sat as Baron Audley) by the Test Act 1678, much to the regret of the Protestant peers, who held him in high regard. He took his leave on 30 November 1678, with a speech expressing his duty to the Crown, and his concern for the peace and welfare of the Kingdom. His fellow peers, knowing him to be in financial difficulty, wrote to Charles II recommending Castlehaven to his bounty.

== Marriage and issue ==
He married twice, first Elizabeth Brydges (died March 1678/9) in Kilkenny, daughter of Grey Brydges, 5th Baron Chandos and of his wife Lady Anne Stanley (1580–1647), who married the 2nd Earl of Castlehaven after Lord Chandos' death. (Anne Stanley was thus both the 3rd Earl's stepmother, and his mother-in-law.). Elisabeth was buried at St Martin-in-the-Fields. He married secondly, about 19 June 1679, Elizabeth Graves (died 1720).

He died without issue on 11 October 1684, at Kilcash Castle, County Tipperary, Ireland and was succeeded in the earldom by his youngest brother Mervyn. Mervyn's older brother George was passed over by virtue of being a Benedictine monk.

== Sources ==
- O Hannrachain, Tadhg (2002). Catholic Reformation in Ireland. Oxford: Oxford University press. ISBN 0-19-820891-X.
- Biography
- Leigh Rayment's Peerage Pages

Peerage of Ireland
Preceded by Mervyn Tuchet	Earl of Castlehaven; 1631–1684	Succeeded by Mervyn Tuchet
Peerage of England
Preceded by Mervyn Tuchet forfeit 1631	Baron Audley; 1678–1684	Succeeded by Mervyn Tuchet
New creation	Baron Audley of Hely; 1633–1684	Succeeded by Mervyn Tuchet
