= George Thicknesse-Touchet, 20th Baron Audley =

British noble

George John Thicknesse-Touchet, 20th Baron Audley (16 April 1781 – 14 January 1837) was a British peer.

The only son of George Thicknesse-Touchet, 19th Baron Audley (1758–1818) and Elizabeth Delaval, he married on 18 April 1816 in Brussels Anne Jane Donelly, daughter of Vice Admiral Sir Ross Donnelly. They had four sons, George Edward, John Nicholas, William Ross and James.

Audley suffered from financial difficulties; an appeal on his behalf in 1829 from Charles Tennant to Robert Peel, the Home Secretary, was met with the latter insisting that Audley had 'received more than his fair share of government assistance'.

The Black Prince Thanking Lord James Audley for his Gallantry in the Battle of Poitiers by Benjamin Robert Haydon, the painting of his ancestor commissioned by Lord Audley in 1836.

The year before his death, he had commissioned Benjamin Haydon to paint a six- by nine-foot canvas commemorating the distinguished service of his forebear, Lord James Audley, at the Battle of Poitiers (this being rewarded by an annuity that continued through the generations), agreeing a price of 500 guineas with an initial payment of 50 pounds. He visited the Haydons, complimenting their twelve-year-old daughter Mary and suggesting his younger son, William, was desirous of marrying her, in which event he would give the Haydons £50,000.

Haydon, wary of his benefactor's eccentricity but impressed by his claims of generosity, indulged him. Audley, a heavy drinker, was made 'excessively tipsy' by the sharing of two bottles of wine and sherry with dinner, and took a cab to Covent Garden where he would stay the night. Some days later, he visited, paying Haydon £85, but no further mention was made of his previous ambitions regarding his son's marriage to Mary Haydon. In response to that young lady's observation of the difference in Lord Audley's conduct, Haydon attributed it to the fact that on the latter visit Audley was sober. Despite paying Haydon a few further advances, the artist was placed in dire financial straits, observing 'Lord Audley has completely deceived me about his resources... after telling me he was the richest peer, it turns out he is the poorest!' At the time of Audley's death ('...with little more to his name than the pension given to his ancestor by the Black Prince nearly five centuries before'), only half of Haydon's work had been accounted for; the artist applied to the 21st Lord Audley for recompense, or he would sell it. Receiving no answer, the painting, 'The Black Prince Thanking Lord James Audley for his Gallantry in the Battle of Poitiers' thus came to be owned by Haydon's landlord William Newton, who already possessed a number of his works.

Audley died on 14 January 1837 and was buried in Melksham. At the time of his death, Audley was observed to be 'somewhat above the ordinary stature' and of considerable weight, with his laden coffin said to be 'about 8 hundredweight' (almost nine hundred pounds); he was an alcoholic, and 'undoubtedly... insane'. He was succeeded by his eldest son, George Edward Thicknesse-Touchet (1817–1872).

Peerage of England
Preceded by George Thicknesse-Touchet	Baron Audley; 1818–1837	Succeeded by George Edward Thicknesse-Touchet
