= Mervyn Tuchet, 4th Earl of Castlehaven =

English noble

Mervyn Tuchet
- 4th Earl of Castlehaven
- Arms of Tuchet, Earl of Castlehaven: Tuchet (Ermine, a chevron gules) quartering Audley (Gules, a fret or)
- Title held: 1684 – 1686
- Predecessor: James Tuchet, 3rd Earl of Castlehaven
- Successor: James Tuchet, 5th Earl of Castlehaven
- Other titles: 14th Baron Audley; 2nd Baron Audley of Hely
- Died: 2 November 1686
- Spouse: Mary Talbot (before 1686)
- Issue: James Tuchet; John Tuchet; Talbot; George; Mary Tuchet; Elizabeth; Eleanor/Helena; Anne
- Father: Mervyn Tuchet, 2nd Earl of Castlehaven
- Mother: Elizabeth Barnham

Mervyn Tuchet, 4th Earl of Castlehaven (died 2 November 1686) was the third son of Mervyn Tuchet, 2nd Earl of Castlehaven, and his first wife, Elizabeth Barnham (1592 - c. 1622). He succeeded his brother James Tuchet as Earl of Castlehaven on 11 October 1684. He also held the subsidiary titles 14th Baron Audley and 2nd Baron Audley of Hely.

== Marriage and issue ==
He married Mary Talbot (buried 15 March 1710/1 in Clewer, Berkshire), 3rd daughter of John Talbot, 10th Earl of Shrewsbury (ante 1601–1654) and his wife, Mary, daughter of Sir Francis Fortescue. She was the widow of Charles Arundel, Esq, son to William Arundell second son to Thomas Arundell of Wardour.

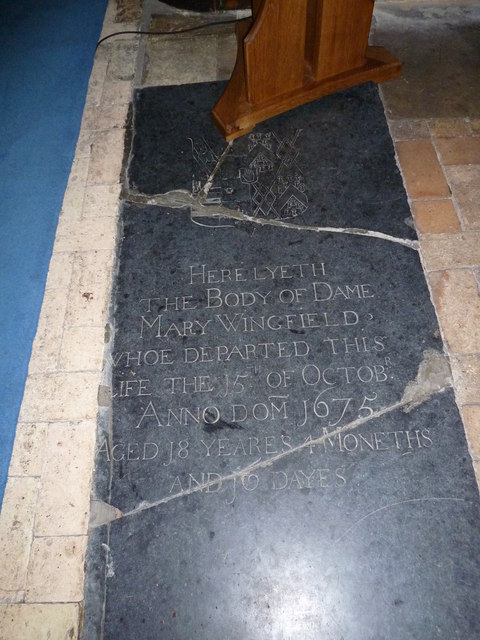
Ledger stone of Mary Tuchet, wife of Sir Henry Wingfield, 4th Baronet. All Saints Church, Easton, Suffolk

They had the following children:

- James Tuchet, 5th Earl of Castlehaven (died 9 August 1700), eldest son and heir;
- John Tuchet, who married Elizabeth Savile, daughter of Thomas Savile Earl of Sussex 1st husband of Anne Villiers, daughter of Christopher Villiers 1st Earl of Anglesey by his wife Elizabeth Sheldon;
- Talbot Tuchet, died young
- George Tuchet, died young
- Mary Tuchet (1657–1675), who married Sir Henry Wingfield, 4th Baronet (c. 1655–1677) of Easton, Suffolk, younger son of Sir Richard Wingfield, 2nd Baronet (died c. 1656) by his second wife, the daughter of Sir John Winter of Lidney in Gloucestershire. Dame Mary died aged 18 in 1675 (as is recorded on her ledger stone in Easton Church, Suffolk), and her husband died two years later, aged 22, while in Dulward, Lorraine, serving the French army, when his leg was shot off. He had at the age of 16 succeeded his elder brother Sir Robert Wingfield, 3rd Baronet (c. 1652–c. 1671). He left two sons:
1. Henry Wingfield (died 1712) Married without issue male
2. Mervin Wingfield (died 1765) Married twice and had issue
- Elizabeth, died young
- Eleanor/Helena
- Anne, who died unmarried

Peerage of Ireland
| Preceded by James Tuchet | Earl of Castlehaven; 1684–1686 | Succeeded by James Tuchet |
