= James Tuchet, 5th Earl of Castlehaven =

Irish noble

James Tuchet
- 5th Earl of Castlehaven
- Predecessor: Mervyn Tuchet
- Successor: James Tuchet
- Died: 12 August 1700
- Cause of death: Apoplexy
- Buried: Winchester Cathedral
- Noble family: Tuchet
- Spouse: Anne Pelson
- Issue: James Tuchet, 6th Earl of Castlehaven
- Father: Mervyn Tuchet, 4th Earl of Castlehaven
- Mother: Mary Talbot

James Tuchet, 5th Earl of Castlehaven (died 12 August 1700) was the son of Mervyn Tuchet, 4th Earl of Castlehaven and Mary Talbot.

He succeeded his father as Earl of Castlehaven on 2 November 1686.

He married Anne Pelson, daughter of Richard Pelson and his wife, née Anne Villiers, daughter of Christopher Villiers, 1st Earl of Anglesey.

They had one son, James, who succeeded him as Earl of Castlehaven.

He died of apoplexy. His gravestone is in the floor of the south aisle of the retrochoir at Winchester Cathedral.

Peerage of Ireland
Preceded by Mervyn Tuchet	Earl of Castlehaven; 1686–1700	Succeeded by James Tuchet
