= Mervyn Tuchet, 2nd Earl of Castlehaven =

English nobleman

The Right Honourable The Earl of Castlehaven
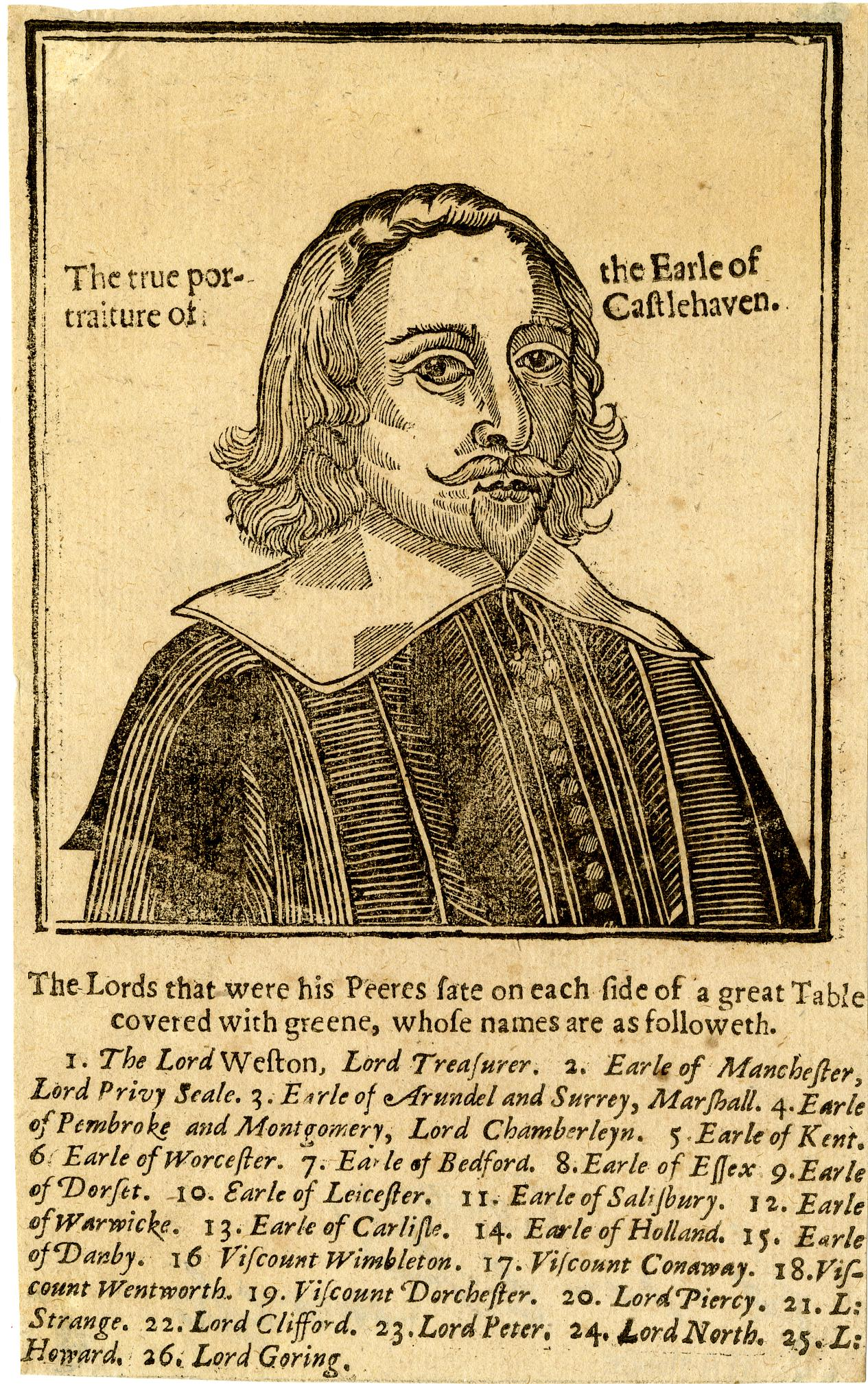
- The 2nd Earl of Castlehaven, from a contemporary print published in the wake of his notorious trial.

Member of Parliament Dorset
- In office 5 April 1614 – 7 June 1625

Justice of the Peace Dorset
- In office 1614–1625

Justice of the Peace Somerset
- In office 1614–1626

Justice of the Peace Wiltshire
- In office 1614–1626

Personal details
- Born: Mervyn Tuchet; 1593
- Died: 14 May 1631 (aged 37–38) Tower Hill, London, England
- Cause of death: Beheaded
- Spouses: Elizabeth Barnham (died 1622) Anne Stanley (m. 1624)
- Children: James Tuchet, 3rd Earl of Castlehaven; Frances Touchet; George Touchet; Mervyn Tuchet, 4th Earl of Castlehaven; Lucy Touchet; Dorothy Touchet; Anne Touchet
- Parent: George Tuchet, 1st Earl of Castlehaven; Lucy Mervyn

Mervyn Tuchet, 2nd Earl of Castlehaven (1593 – 14 May 1631; also spelled Mervin, Touchet), was an English nobleman who was convicted of rape and sodomy and subsequently executed.

A son of George Tuchet, 1st Earl of Castlehaven and 11th Baron Audley, by his wife, Lucy Mervyn, he was known by the courtesy title of Lord Audley during his father's lifetime, so is sometimes referred to as Mervyn Audley.

He was knighted by James I in 1608, before he studied law at the Middle Temple. He served as Member of the Parliament of England for Dorset in the Addled Parliament of 1614 and was a Justice of the Peace for the counties of Dorset, Somerset, and Wiltshire. He succeeded his father on 20 February 1616 or 1617 as Earl of Castlehaven and Baron Audley. He left six children upon his death.

Sometime before 1608 (records of the marriage are lacking), Lord Audley married Elizabeth Barnham, a sister-in-law of the philosopher and scientist Francis Bacon, and with her, he had six children. By all accounts the marriage was a loving and successful one, ending with her death in 1622. His second marriage, on 22 July 1624, at Harefield, Middlesex, was to the former Lady Anne Stanley (1580–1647), elder daughter and co-heiress of Ferdinando Stanley, 5th Earl of Derby (by his wife, Alice Spencer), and widow of Grey Brydges, 5th Baron Chandos. They had a daughter, Anne Touchet, who died young. Lady Anne was significantly older than Castlehaven, and the marriage was not a success, but in 1628 Lord Castlehaven's son was married to her thirteen-year-old daughter, Elizabeth; a marriage of step-children.

== Trial on charges of rape and sodomy ==
In 1630, Castlehaven was publicly accused of allowing another man to rape his wife and committing sodomy with two of his servants. Castlehaven's son, James, claimed that it was the extent of Castlehaven's "uxoriousness" toward his male favourites which led to his initial lodging of a complaint.

At a trial by his peers, it was stated that one such favourite, Henry Skipwith, had arrived at Fonthill Gifford in 1621 and that within a few years he was so close to Castlehaven that he sat at the family's table and was to be addressed as "Mister Skipwith" by the servants. Several years later, Giles Broadway arrived at the house and received similar treatment. It was not long before Castlehaven was providing Skipwith with an annual pension, and he was accused of attempting to have Skipwith inseminate both Anne and her daughter Elizabeth, to produce an heir from Skipwith instead of his son.

Charges were brought against Castlehaven on the complaint of his eldest son and heir, who feared disinheritance, and were heard by the Privy Council under the direction of Thomas Coventry, Lord High Steward. Lady Castlehaven gave evidence of a household which she said was infested with debauchery, and the Attorney-General acting for the prosecution explained to the court that Castlehaven had become ill because "he believed not God", an impiety which made Castlehaven unsafe. However, he insisted he was not guilty and that his wife and son had conspired together in an attempt to commit judicial murder. All witnesses against Castlehaven would gain materially by his death (as the defendant put it: "It is my estate, my Lords, that does accuse me this day, and nothing else") and "News writers throughout England and as far away as Massachusetts Bay speculated about the outcome."

Castlehaven maintained his innocence, and the trial aroused considerable public debate. After some deliberation, the Privy Council returned a unanimous verdict of guilty on the charge of rape. The sodomy charge was also upheld, but by a slim margin as not all jurors agreed that actual penetration had taken place. The case remains of interest to some as an early trial concerning male homosexuality, but ultimately its greatest influence proved to be as a precedent in spousal rights, as it became the leading case establishing an injured wife's right to testify against her husband.

Castlehaven was convicted for his sexual crimes: namely the "unnatural crime" of sodomy, committed with his page Laurence (or Florence) FitzPatrick; and assisting Giles Browning (alias Broadway) in the rape of his wife Anne, Countess of Castlehaven, in which Lord Castlehaven was found to have participated by restraining her. Attainder was decreed. Under the terms of the attainder, Castlehaven forfeited his English barony of Audley, created for heirs general, but retained his Irish earldom and barony since it was an entailed honour protected by the statute De Donis.

== Confession of Faith and Execution ==
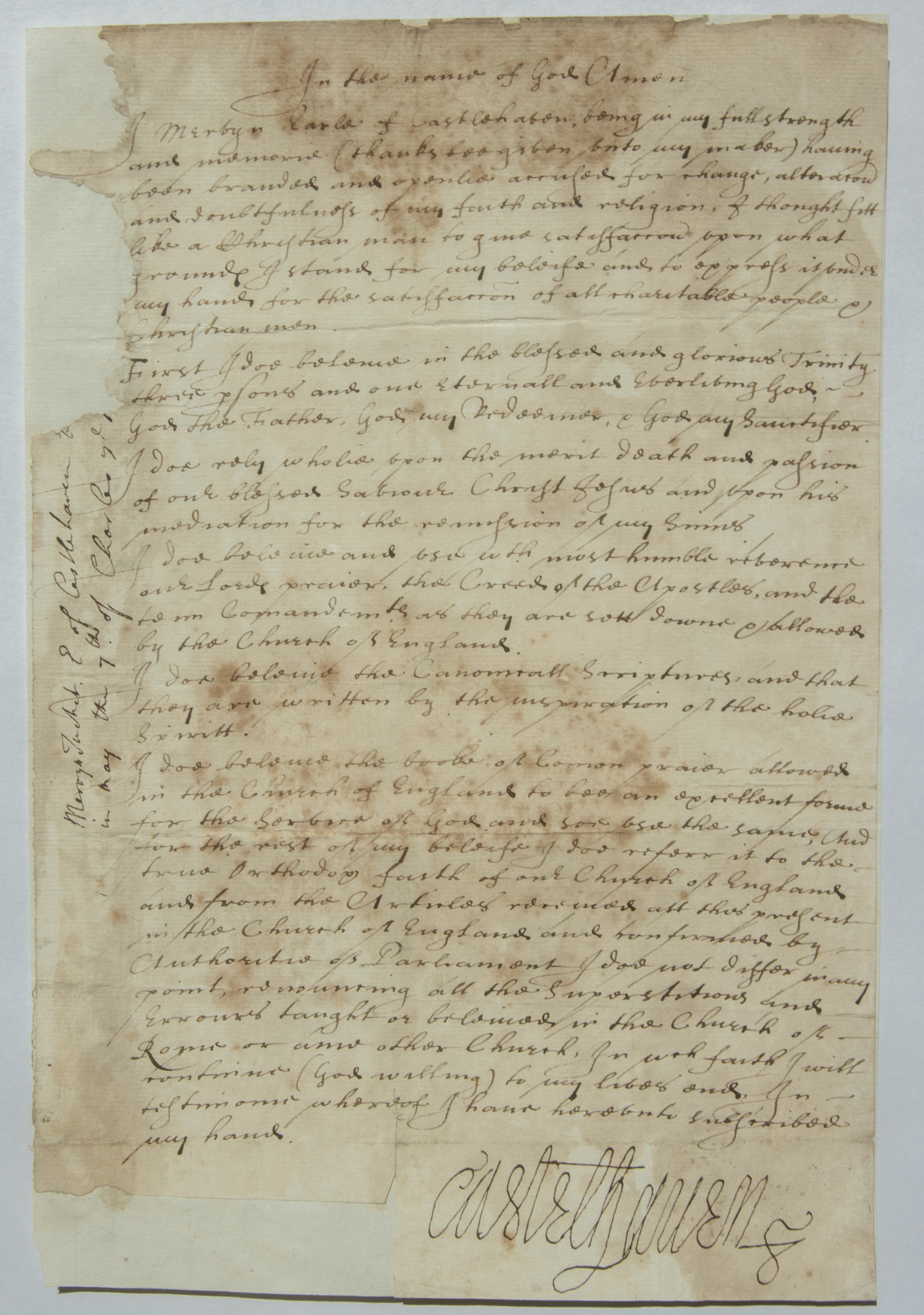
The original signed Confession of Faith of Mervyn Tuchet, 2nd Earl of Castlehaven that was read out at his request on the scaffold on 14 May 1631 at Tower Hill in London immediately prior to his execution by beheading.

In the days leading up to Castlehaven's execution, Thomas Winniffe the Dean of St Paul's and a Doctor Wickham visited Castlehaven daily, both to comfort him and settle him in his religion. Winniffe drafted a Confession of Faith and Castlehaven signed it.

On Saturday 14 May 1631, Castlehaven, accompanied by Winniffe and others, left the Tower of London and ascended the scaffold at Tower Hill which had been constructed for his execution. Concerned about rumours suggesting his lack of faith had prompted his downfall, he said the following to the assembled crowd:

Now forasmuch as there hath been speech and rumour of my unsettledness in my religion, I have for explanation, thereof, not only made Confession of my Faith to two worthy doctors; but for better satisfaction to the world in that point, express the same in writing under my hand signed; which as it is here set down, I desire may be publicly read.

That signed Confession of Faith was then read aloud on the scaffold by a young gentleman:

In the name of God Amen

I Mervyn Earle of Castlehaven, being in my full strength and memorie (thanks bee given unto my maker) having been branded and openlie accused for change, alteration and doubtfulness of my faith and religion, if thoughtfull like a Christian man to give satisfacction upon what grounds I stand for my belieifes and to express it under my hand for the satisfaccion of all charitable people & Christian men.

First I doe believe in the blessed and glorious Trinity three persones and one eternall and everliving God, God the Father, God my Redeemer, & God my Sanctifier. I doe rely wholie upon the merit death and passion of oue blessed Saviour Christ Jesus and upon his mediation for the remission of my Sinnes.

I doe believe and use wth most humble reverence Our Lordes praire, the Creed of the Apostles, and the ten Comandemts as they are sett downe & allowed by the Church of England.

I doe believe the Canonicall Scriptures, and that they are written by the inspiration of the holie Spiritt.

I doe believe the booke of Comon praier allowed in the Church of England to bee an excellent forme for the Service of God and soe use the same, and for the rest of my beliefe I doe referr it to the true Orthodox faith of oue Church of England and from the Articles received att this present In the Church of England and confirmed by Authoritie of Parliament I doe not differ in any point, renouncing all the superstitions and Erroures taught or believed in the Church of Rome or anie other Church, in wch faith I will confirme (God willing) to my lives end, in testimonie whereof I have hereunto subscribed my hand.

Castelhaven

After that, Castlehaven acknowledged the King’s mercy; said a short private prayer; laid his head on the block and was beheaded with a single stroke.

== Aftermath ==
Castlehaven's Irish titles passed to his son James.

Elizabeth was estranged from her husband and left to fend for herself in England, often in the company of Lady Elizabeth Petre, herself estranged from her husband William Petre, 4th Baron Petre. James was married to Elizabeth Graves within months of his first wife's death.

Laurence FitzPatrick and Giles Browning were each put on trial for their roles in the offences. FitzPatrick testified that Lady Castlehaven "was the wickedest woman in the world, and had more to answer for than any woman that lived". Both men were convicted and subsequently executed.

The historian Cynthia B. Herrup, writes that Anne "always insisted upon her innocence, and in theory, her husband’s condemnation should have vindicated her" but that "her life after 1631 was a very partial exoneration" and "The most popular verse circulating after the trial portrayed Castlehaven as a cuckold rather than the Countess as a victim." In The Complete Peerage, Cokayne adds that the death of Castlehaven was certainly brought about by his wife's manipulations and that her undoubted adultery with one Ampthill and with Henry Skipwith renders her motives suspicious.

== Children ==
Mervyn Touchet's first marriage (before 1608) was with Elizabeth Barnham (1592 – c. 1622–4), daughter of London alderman Benedict Barnham and his wife, Dorothea Smith, and they had six surviving children:

- James Tuchet, 3rd Earl of Castlehaven (1612–1684), who married Elizabeth Brydges (1614 or 1615 – 1679), daughter of his stepmother, but left no surviving children
- Lady Frances Touchet (born 1617)
- Hon. George Touchet (died c. 1689), who became a Benedictine monk
- Mervyn Tuchet, 4th Earl of Castlehaven (died 1686)
- Lady Lucy Touchet (died 1662)
- Lady Dorothy Touchet (died 1635)

His second marriage was with Lady Anne Stanley, 22 July 1624, daughter of Ferdinando Stanley and Alice Spencer. From this marriage there was one daughter:

- Anne Touchet, died young.

Peerage of Ireland
Preceded by George Tuchet	Earl of Castlehaven; 1617–1631	Succeeded by James Tuchet
Peerage of England
Preceded by George Tuchet	Baron Audley; 1617–1631	Forfeit Title next held by James Tuchet
