= James Tuchet, 6th Earl of Castlehaven =

Irish noble (d. 1740)

The Right Honourable James Tuchet
- Earl of Castlehaven
- Coat of arms
- Tenure: 1700–1740
- Predecessor: James Tuchet, 5th Earl of Castlehaven
- Successor: James Tuchet, 7th Earl of Castlehaven
- Died: October 12, 1740
- Spouse: Hon. Elizabeth Arundell (m. 1722)
- Issue: James Tuchet, 7th Earl of Castlehaven; John Tuchet, 8th Earl of Castlehaven; Lady Elizabeth Tuchet
- Father: James Tuchet, 5th Earl of Castlehaven
- Mother: Anne Pelson

James Tuchet, 6th Earl of Castlehaven (died 12 October 1740) was the son of James Tuchet, 5th Earl of Castlehaven and his wife Anne Pelson.

He succeeded his father as Earl of Castlehaven and Baron Audley on 9 August 1700.

He married, on 14 May 1722, Elizabeth Arundell (1693–1743), daughter of Henry Arundell, 5th Baron Arundell of Wardour and his wife, née Elizabeth Panton.

They had two sons and at least one daughter:

- James Tuchet, 7th Earl of Castlehaven (1723–1769)
- John Tuchet, 8th Earl of Castlehaven (1724–1777)
- Lady Elizabeth Tuchet

He is buried at the church of St. Sulpice in Paris, France.

Peerage of Ireland
Preceded by James Tuchet	Earl of Castlehaven; 1700–1740	Succeeded by James Tuchet
