= Baron Tuchet =

Extinct barony in the Peerage of England

Baron Tuchet was a title that was twice been created in the Peerage of England.

== Baron Tuchet; First creation (1299) ==
- William Tuchet, 1st Baron Tuchet (d. 1322), title extinct.

== Baron Tuchet; Second creation (1403) ==
- John Tuchet, 4th Baron Audley, 1st Baron Tuchet (1371–1408)
- James Tuchet, 5th Baron Audley, 2nd Baron Tuchet (c. 1398–1459)
- For further barons, see Baron Audley
