= Manor of Tawstock =

Former manor in Devon, England

The Tawstock House and St. Peter's church, Devon, from Codden Hill, by Thomas Bonner for Rev. Richard Polwhele's History of Devonshire, 1797-98. (slightly cropped). 'TAWSTOCK HOUSE, To Sir Bourchier Wrey, Bart

The historic manor of Tawstock was situated in North Devon, in the hundred of Fremington, 2 miles south of Barnstaple, England. According to Pole the feudal baron of Barnstaple Henry de Tracy (died 1274) made Tawstock his seat, apparently having abandoned Barnstaple Castle as the chief residence of the barony. Many of the historic lords of the manor are commemorated by monuments in St Peter's Church, the parish church of Tawstock (situated to the east of the manor house) which in the opinion of Pevsner contains "the best collection in the county (of Devon) apart from those in the cathedral", and in the opinion of Hoskins "contains the finest collection of monuments in Devon and one of the most notable in England".

The manor house, known in the 17th century as Tawstock House and today known as Tawstock Court, is situated at the west end of the parish church and is in the Georgian neo-gothic architectural style, having replaced the former Tudor mansion which was destroyed by fire in 1787. The only survival from the earlier house is the splendid Tudor gatehouse with the 1574 datestone, one of only a few in Devon. Some of the buildings on this property are Heritage listed including St Michael's School (now a residence), the Stable Block, garden structures, the Gatehouse and other gates, and the Coach House (all Grade II).

The Church of St Peter is a Grade I listed property. A church existed at this location circa the 12th century, but was extensively modified and enlarged. According to the listing summary, "the crossing tower, north and south transepts and aisles were added" in the 14th century; additional modifications were made in the next two centuries before a restoration in 1867-1868.

== Tawstock Court ==
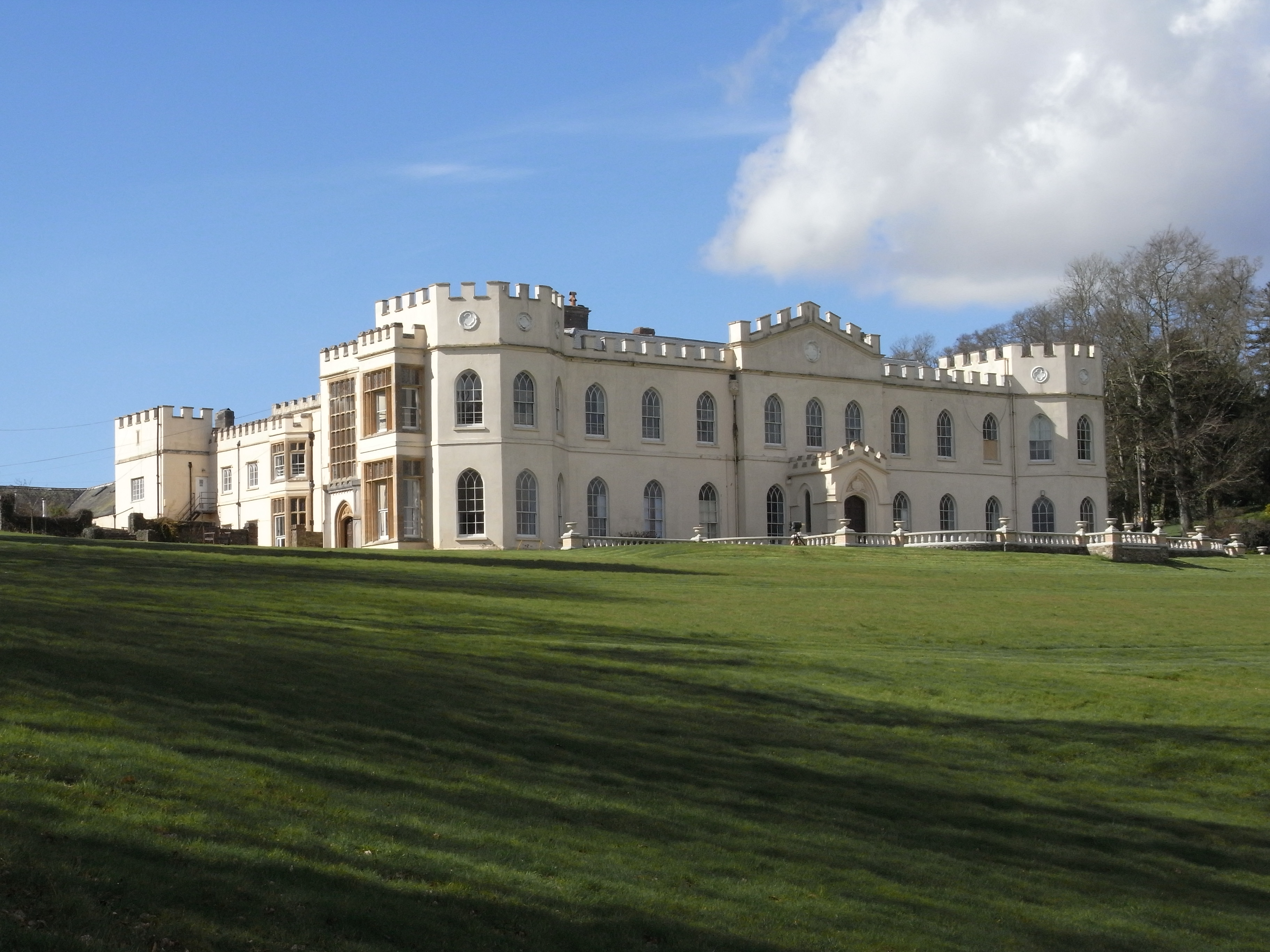
Tawstock Court, view from south-east. Parts of the Elizabethan building, including large mullioned windows, survive in the south wing (left), which faces the surviving Elizabethan gate-house

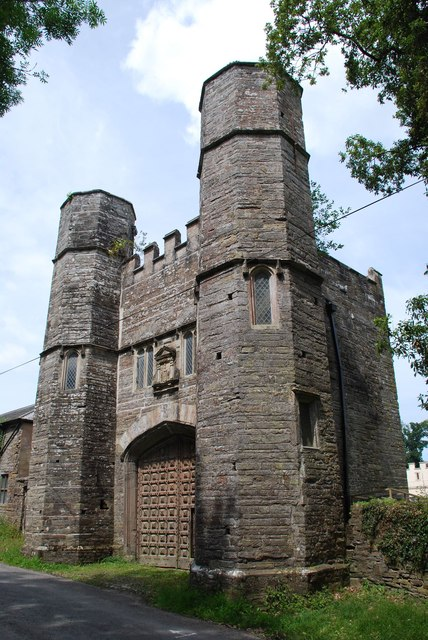
Elizabethan gatehouse built in 1574 of Tawstock Court, viewed from south-east; a Grade II listed building

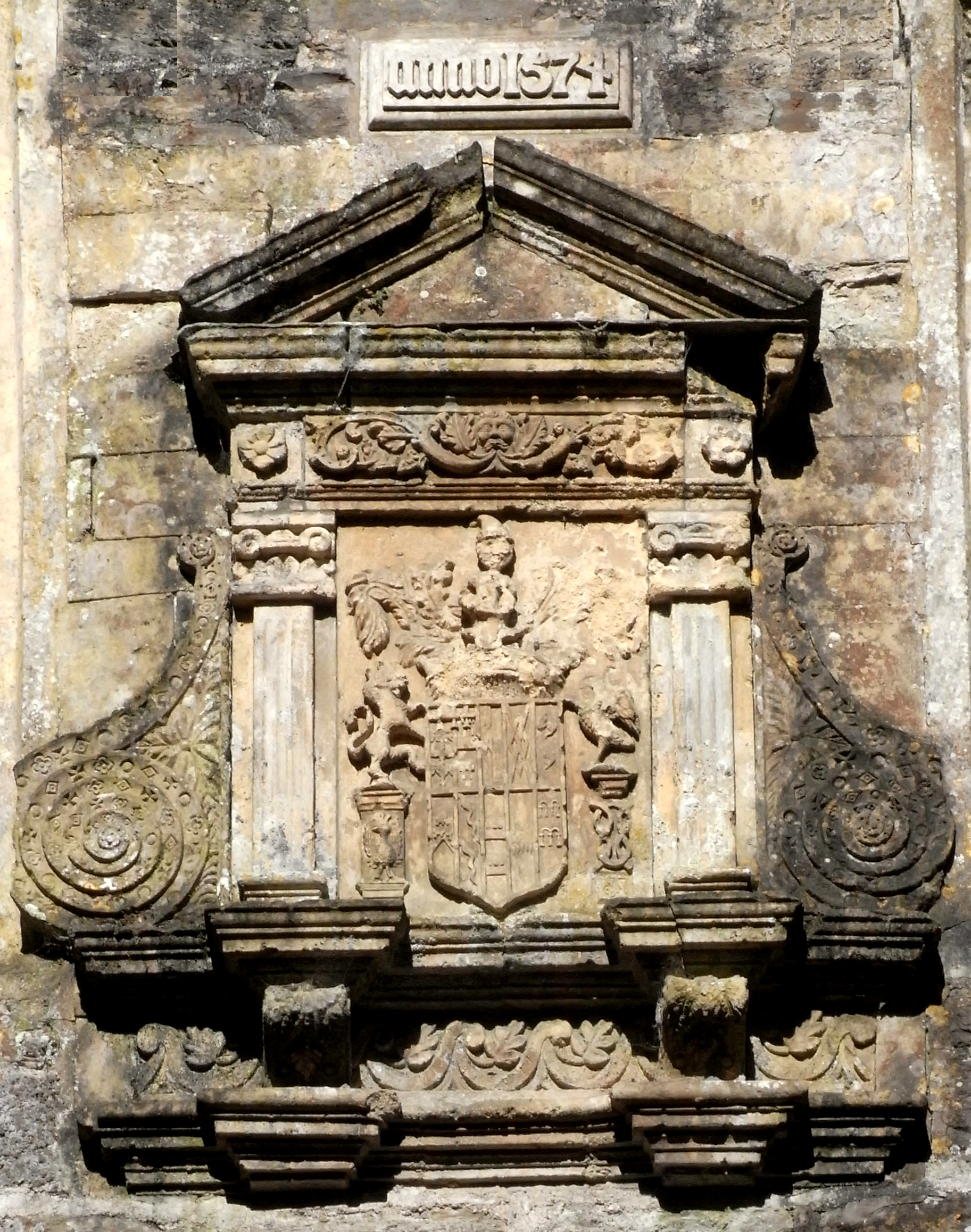
Renaissance aedicule (with (restored) date-stone "Anno 1574" above) over gateway on south facade of Elizabethan gatehouse, Tawstock Court. Contains the heraldic achievement of William Bourchier, 3rd Earl of Bath (died 1623).

The Elizabethan mansion re-built by William Bourchier, 3rd Earl of Bath, no longer exists apart from the gatehouse, with date-stone 1574. Four years after Sir Bourchier Wrey, 7th Baronet, inherited the estate the house burned down in 1787 and was rebuilt by him in the Neo-Gothic style by about 1800, when Rev. John Swete described visiting it in his travel journal: "Entering through a gateway of antient date by the stables I arrived in front of Tawstock House the seat of Sir Bourchier Wrey which when completed (for it is now but a shell) will be one of the finest houses in the county". Part of the Elizabethan house survives today on the south front. The north front was re-modelled in 1885.

The principal east front, with crenellated parapet and two end turrets, faces towards St Peter's Parish Church and has an extensive view across the River Taw to Bishops Tawton village and Codden Hill. Sir Robert Bourchier Sherard Wrey, 11th Baronet (1855–1917) was the last to live at Tawstock Court and "to keep house in the old manner". In about 1940 it damaged by fire and was restored and let by the 13th Baronet to St Michael's Preparatory School. His nephew and heir, the 14th Baronet sold Tawstock Court to the school in the 1970s.

The school continued to occupy Tawstock Court until 2012 when it closed due to insolvency. On 17 July 2012 the property with 32 acres was purchased from the administrator by a property investor and developer, as a private residence. As a condition of the sale, the nursery school division of St Michael's School continued to operate (in 2013) in the stable blocks to the immediate west of the house.

A building described as "a folly, built in form of look-out tower" located near the Manor was dubbed "The Tower" in its 1965 Grade II listing report (Entry #1253651). The structure was restored and converted into a home that was listed for sale in 2019/2020 as "Tawstock Castle". Some reports states that the tower was thought to have been built by Sir Bourchier Wrey and subsequently expanded. The Historic England summary simply indicates that it probably originated in the late 18th century. An article in Country Life (magazine) referred to the structure as a "baby Windsor Castle".

=== Church of St Peter ===
This church is very unusual in having a tower over the crossing and not as usual at the west end. Only a few other churches in Devon display this feature, for example at Crediton, Colyton and Axminster.

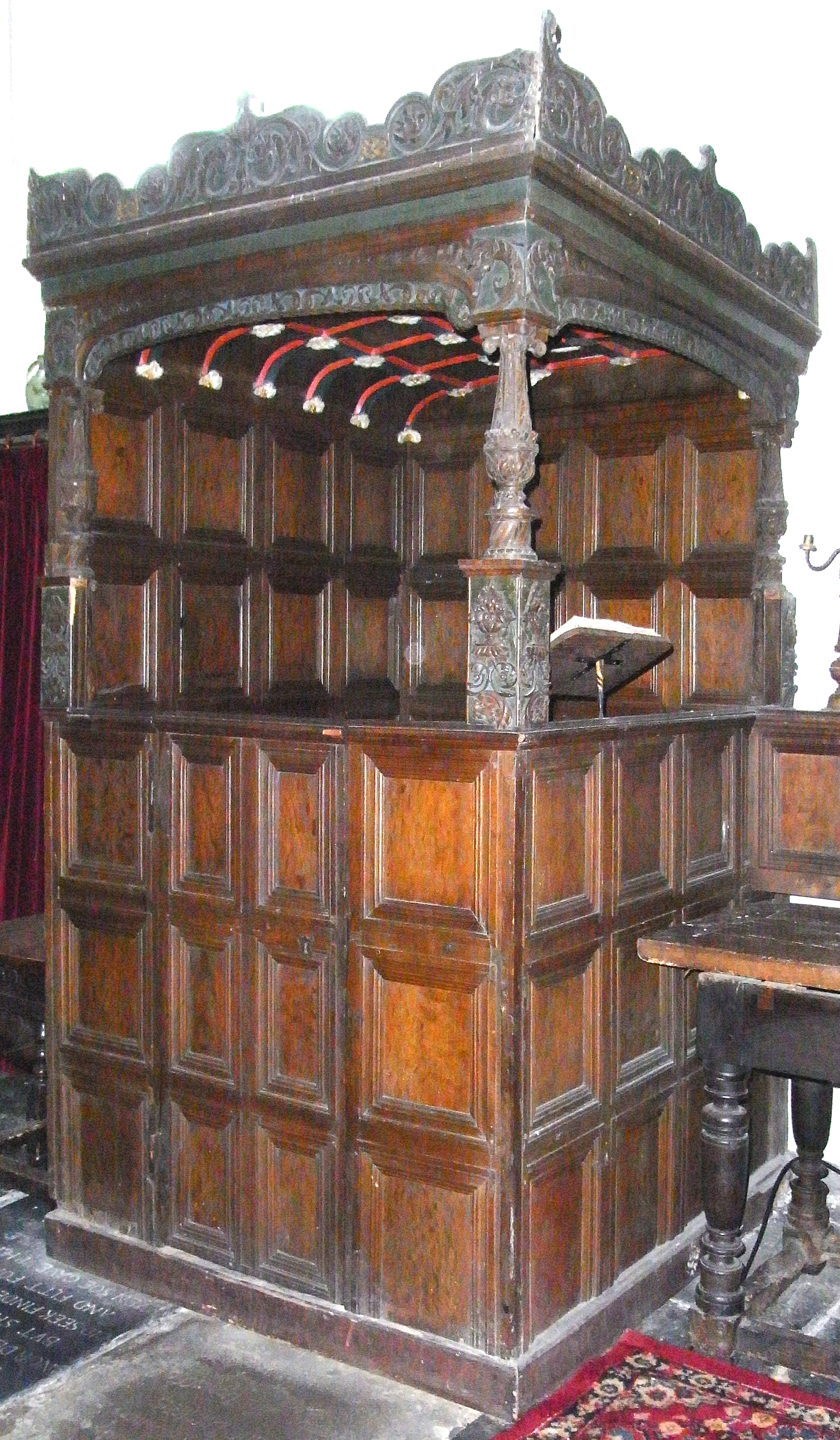
The "Bourchier Pew"

The "Bourchier Pew" (or "Manorial Pew") in the north transept was made in about 1550 in Franco-Flemish early Renaissance style, and decorated with Bourchier knots, it was used by the lords of the manor of Tawstock. The unusual and small manorial pew (Note: "The Renaissance of the South-West, whether in clerical or in secular woodwork, is nearly always richer in detail than in the East of England. It is also, as a rule, exceedingly varied, yet possessing marked characteristics which are typical and recognisable. Such examples as the fine Wrey pew in Tawstock Church...may be cited as representative of the expression of the French Renaissance in Devonshire. So closely was the style assimilated, and so fine in execution and full in design are many of these Devonshire examples, that the hand of the French carver and designer has often been suspected, and with reason. In spite of this foreign character, very strong in such details as the balusters supporting the tester of this rich pew, there is no question as to its English origin, although French collaboration may be granted in its designing".) has been mistaken for a confessional due to its box-like appearance.

The Bourchier knot is much in evidence within the church, in windows, on bench-ends and on monuments. Much detail concerning the administration of the manor in the 17th century survives in the form of the household accounts maintained by the 5th Earl of Bath and his wife and include a complete inventory of the household contents room by room in 1648.

== Descent of the manor ==
=== Royal demesne ===
In the Domesday Book of 1086 it was recorded as TAVESTOCHE, the 40th of 72 holdings in Devon held in demesne by King William the Conqueror. There were approximately 48.5 households in the settlement at that time making it larger than about 80 percent of other settlements.

=== de Totnes ===
Juhel de Totnes
King Henry I (1100–1135) granted the manor to Juhel de Totnes (died 1123/30), feudal baron of Barnstaple (died 1123/30). Tawstock thus became one of the many manors which comprised the barony. He gave the tithes of the rectory to the Priory of St Mary Magdalene in Barnstaple which he had founded near his seat Barnstaple Castle in about 1107.

Alfred de Totnes
Juhel's son and heir was Alfred de Totnes, who died sine prole some time before 1139, leaving two sisters as his co-heiresses each to a moiety of the barony: Aenor, who married the Welsh Marcher Lord Philip de Braose (died 1134/55), 2nd feudal baron of Bramber, Surrey, and a sister whose name is unknown, who married Henry de Tracy (died before 1165). The inheritance of the barony of Barnstaple by two co-heiresses split its possession during the period c. 1139 to 1213 into two moieties, which later became re-united under the de Tracy family. Amongst the manors which were inherited by Aenor as her share was Tawstock.

Aenor de Totnes
Sister and co-heiress of Alfred de Totnes, who married Philip de Braose (died 1134/55), 2nd feudal baron of Bramber.

=== de Braose ===
William de Braose (died c. 1192/3)
Eldest son and heir.

William de Braose (died 1211)
Son and heir. He gave the manor of Tawstock to his daughter Loretta de Braose together with two other knight's fees within his moiety of the barony, as her marriage portion on her marriage to Robert FitzPernel, Earl of Leicester (alias Robert de Beaumont, 4th Earl of Leicester (died c.1204)). William III's son and heir was Reginald de Braose, who due to King John (1199–1216) having in 1208 confiscated his father's lands, never inherited the Braose moiety of the barony of Barnstaple.

Loretta de Braose
Daughter of William de Braose (died 1211) and wife of Robert FitzPernel, Earl of Leicester (alias Robert de Beaumont, 4th Earl of Leicester (died c.1204)). Loretta was childless and according to Pole gave Tawstock (2/3rds of the manor only according to Thorn) to her niece Matilda de Braose, daughter of the disinherited Reginald de Braose (son of William de Braose (died 1211)) and wife of Henry de Tracy (died 1274). Henry was the great-grandson of the second unnamed daughter and co-heiress of Alfred de Totnes, and thus had already inherited the other moiety of the feudal barony of Barnstaple. The remaining 1/3rd of the manor of Tawstock was given, apparently by Loretta, to Buckland Priory in Somerset, for the support of the sisters of the Order of St John of Jerusalem. In 1213 King John granted the Braose moiety which he had confiscated from William de Braose to Henry de Tracy (died 1274), the husband of his granddaughter Matilda de Braose. Thus were the two moieties of the barony re-united together and with 2/3rds of the manor of Tawstock.

=== de Tracy ===
Matilda de Braose was given 2/3rds of the manor of Tawstock by her childless aunt Loretta, Countess of Leicester. Matilda married Henry de Tracy (died 1274), feudal baron of Barnstaple, who according to Pole made Tawstock his seat, apparently having abandoned Barnstaple Castle as the chief residence of the Barons of Barnstaple. Tawstock then descended via her daughter Eve de Tracy., by her husband Henry de Tracy (died 1274), feudal baron of Barnstaple.

=== FitzMartin ===
Henry de Tracy's heir to the entire barony, including 2/3rds of the manor of Tawstock, was his granddaughter Maud de Brian (or Briene) (died before 1279), daughter of Guy de Brian of Laugharne Castle, Carmarthenshire by his wife Eve de Tracy, daughter of Henry de Tracy. Maud's first husband was Nicholas FitzMartin (died 1260), who had pre-deceased his father Nicholas FitzMartin (died 1282), feudal baron of Blagdon, Somerset. Maud married secondly Geoffrey de Camville (died 1308), of Clifton Campville, Staffordshire, who had summons to attend the king at Portsmouth, with horse and arms, to embark in the expedition then proceeding to Gascony. He was subsequently summoned to parliament as Baron Camville, of Clifton, in the county of Stafford, from 23 June 1295 to 22 February 1307. Camville survived her by about 29 years during which time he retained possession of the barony, including 2/3rds of the manor of Tawstock, under the curtesy of England.

The barony was recovered on Geoffrey's death by Maud's son William FitzMartin (died 1324) whose son and heir William FitzMartin died sine prole in 1326.

=== Audley ===
Arms of Audley: Gules a fret or.

The heirs of William FitzMartin (died 1326) were his surviving sister Eleanor FitzMartin (died 1342), who died childless, albeit having married twice, and James Audley, 2nd Baron Audley (died 1386), the son of his other sister Joan FitzMartin (died 1322), by her second husband Nicholas Audley, 1st Baron Audley (died 1316) of Heleigh Castle, Staffordshire. James Audley thus in 1342 inherited his childless aunt Eleanor's moiety of the barony of Barnstaple, giving him possession of the whole, including 2/3rds of the manor of Tawstock. In 1370 James Audley, 2nd Baron, settled the manor of Tawstock in tail male successively to his three sons from his second marriage, Thomas, Rodeland and James, who all died without children. On the death of James Audley, 2nd Baron Audley (1312/13–1386) in 1386 the barony of Barnstaple, including 2/3rds of the manor of Tawstock, passed to his surviving son, Nicholas Audley, 3rd Baron Audley (c. 1328 – 1391), who died without issue. His co-heiresses were his two full-sisters Joan and Margaret and his half-sister, also Margaret, who inherited Tawstock:

- Joan Audley (1331–1393) who married Sir John Tuchet (1327–1371),
- Margaret Audley (before 1351 – 1410/11), who married Sir Roger Hillary.
- Margaret Audley (died 1373), his half-sister, who according to Pole inherited Tawstock by a special entail, and married Fulk FitzWarin, 4th Baron FitzWarin (1341–1374).

=== FitzWarin ===
Arms of FitzWarin: Quarterly per fess indented argent and gules

The FitzWarin family were powerful Marcher Lords seated at Whittington Castle in Shropshire and at Alveston in Gloucestershire. The title Baron FitzWarin was created by writ of summons for Fulk FitzWarin in 1295. The descent of the manor of Tawstock in the FitzWarin family is as follows:

Fulk FitzWarin, 4th Baron FitzWarin (1341–1374)
Margaret Audley (died 1373), heiress of Tawstock, married Fulk FitzWarin, 4th Baron FitzWarin (1341–1374) of Whittington Castle, Shropshire and Alveston, Gloucestershire. In 1392 Margaret's 3-year-old grandson Fulk FitzWarin, 6th Baron FitzWarin (1389–1407), feudal baron of Bampton, Devon, inherited the manor of Tawstock.

Fulk FitzWarin, 5th Baron FitzWarin (1362–1391)
Son of Margaret Audley (died 1373), married Elizabeth Cogan, heiress of her brother John Cogan (died 1382), feudal baron of Bampton, Devon, who died as a minor in the wardship of the king. She was the daughter of Sir William Cogan by his second wife Isabel Loring, the elder daughter and co-heiress of Sir Nele Loring (c. 1320 – 1386), KG, of Chalgrave, Bedfordshire, a founding member of the Order of the Garter.

Fulk FitzWarin, 6th Baron FitzWarin (1389–1407)
In 1392 Margaret's 3-year-old grandson Fulk FitzWarin, 6th Baron FitzWarin (1389–1407), feudal baron of Bampton, Devon, inherited the manor.

Fulk FitzWarin, 7th Baron FitzWarin (1406–1420)
Son, died aged 14 when his heir became his sister Elizabeth FitzWarin.

=== Hankford ===
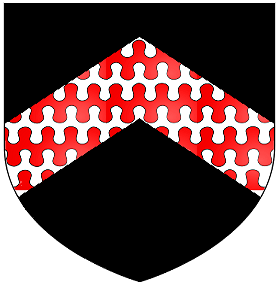
Arms of Hankford of Annery, Devon: Sable, a chevron barry nebuly argent and gules

Sir Richard Hankford (c. 1397 – 1431) (grandson and heir of Sir William Hankford (died 1422) of Annery, Devon, Lord Chief Justice of England) married as his first wife the heiress of Tawstock Elizabeth FitzWarin, 8th Baroness FitzWarin (c. 1404 – c. 1427). They had no male children. Upon her death the barony must have been in abeyance between her daughters Thomasine Hankford (1423–1453), born and baptised at Tawstock, and Elizabeth Hankford (c. 1424 – 1433) until the death of the latter in 1433, when Thomasine became 9th Baroness. By Thomasine's marriage to William Bourchier, 9th Baron FitzWarin (1407–1470), the estates including Tawstock passed into the Bourchier family, which originated at the manor of Little Easton in Essex.

=== Bourchier ===
Canting arms of Bourchier: Argent, a cross engrailed gules between four water bougets sable. Badge: Bourchier knot

The later heir of the FitzWarins was the Bourchier family, Earls of Bath and Barons FitzWarin, who made Tawstock their seat and were highly influential in Barnstaple society and politics. They also inherited via the Audleys other manors formerly part of the barony of Barnstaple, including Nymet Tracy, St Marychurch, Kingston, Marwood and Upexe. Another manor which descended from the Audleys was Holne on the River Dart, which was later used as a hunting estate ("Holne Chase") by the Wreys. Their 17th century landholdings in total comprised 36 manors in the counties of Devon, Cornwall, Somerset, Gloucestershire, Wiltshire and Berkshire. The Bourchier Barnstaple townhouse is thought to survive as no. 62 Boutport Street, with its surviving ornate plaster barrel-ceilings dated 1620 (or 1629), showing the arms of Bourchier, which survives next to the Royal and Fortescue Hotel, and was converted in about 1760 to premises of the "Golden Lion" coaching inn. It was converted to premises for the National Westminster Bank in 1936, in 1991 housed a branch of the Woolwich Building Society and in 2014 is a restaurant. The Bourchier family, the Devon branch of which, seated at Tawstock Court, was later created Earls of Bath, retained the manor of Bampton until at least the time of Risdon (died 1640) who states in his Survey of Devon that "the Earl of Bath is lord of this manor". The descent of Bampton was as follows:

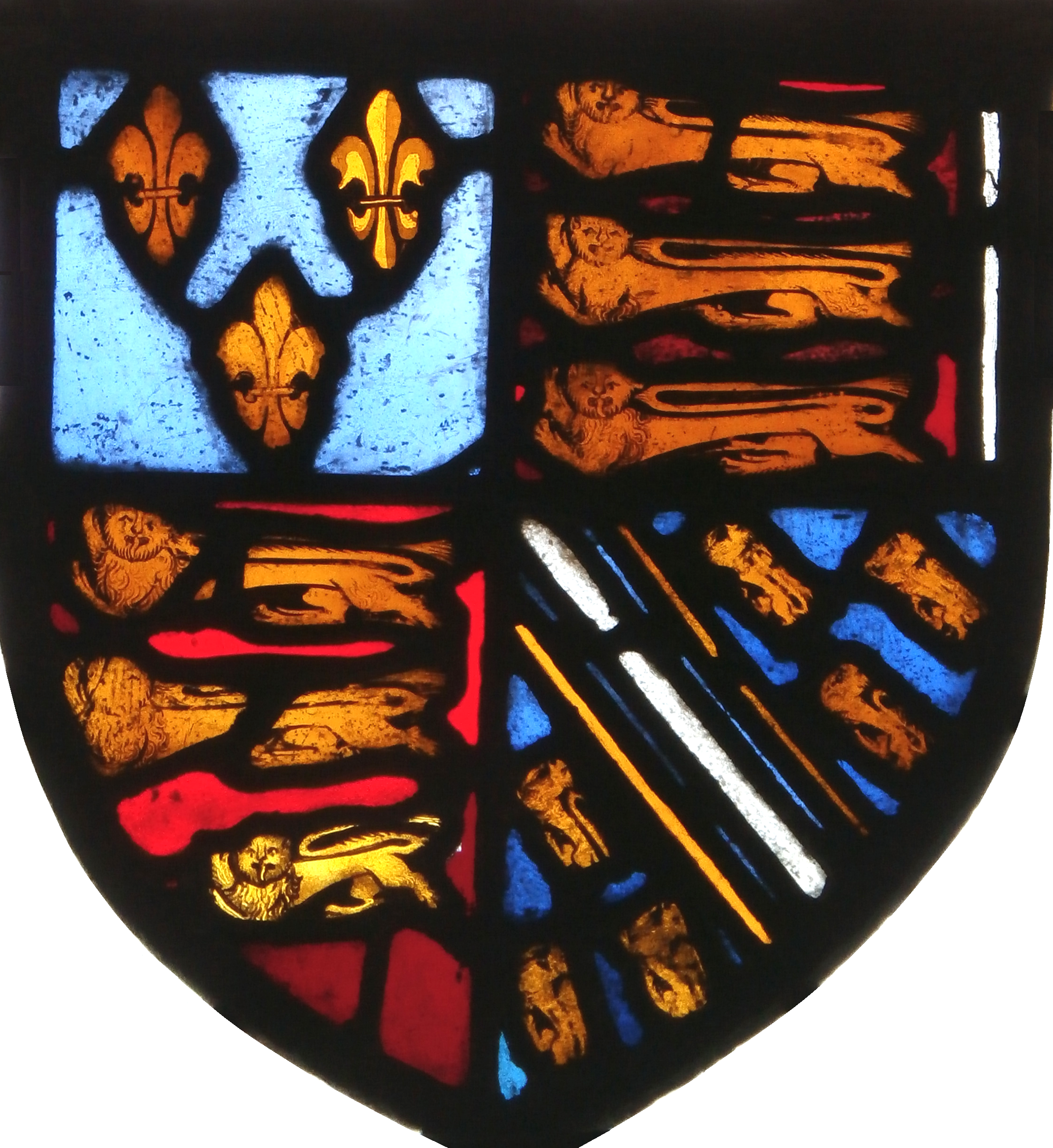
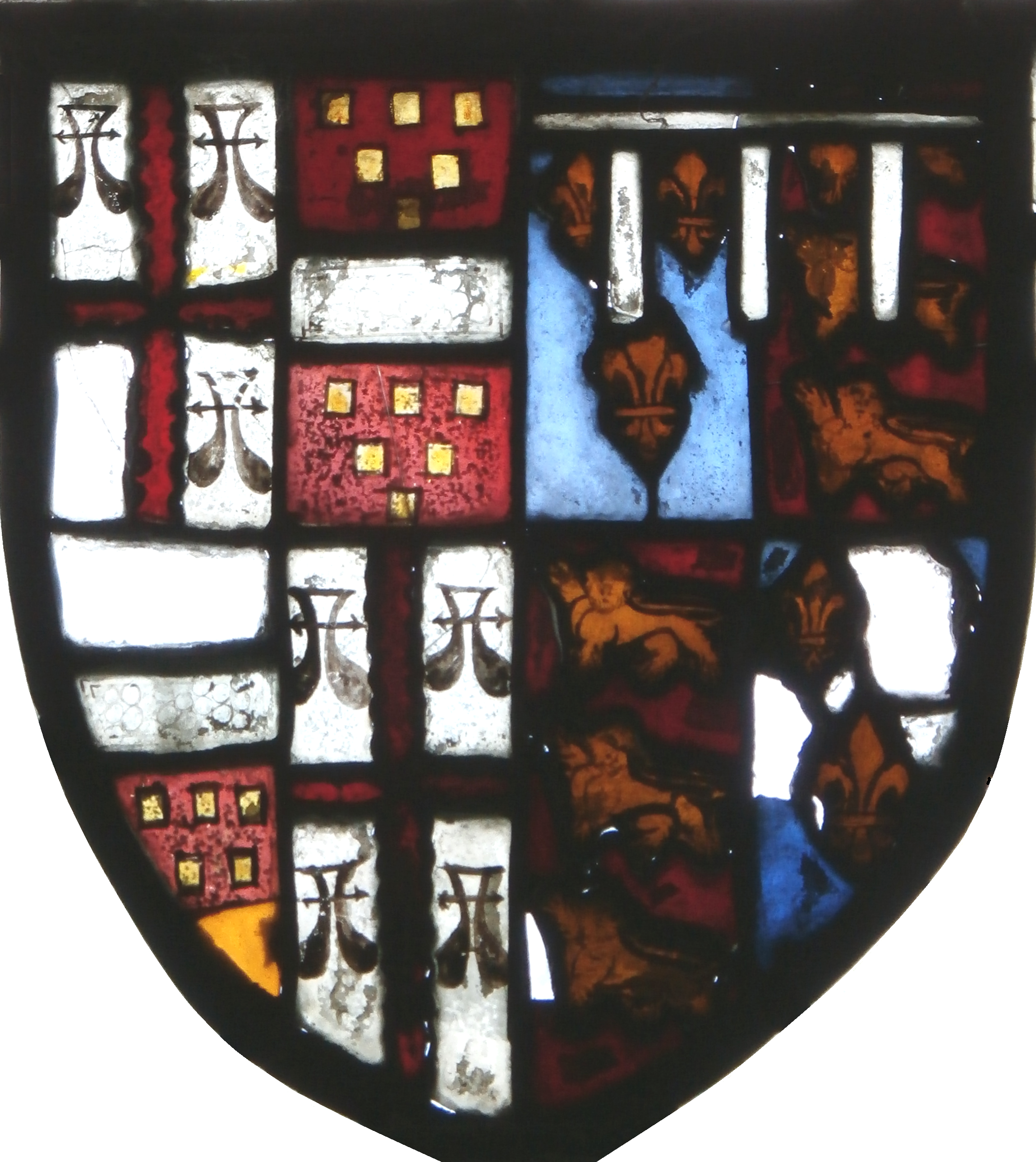
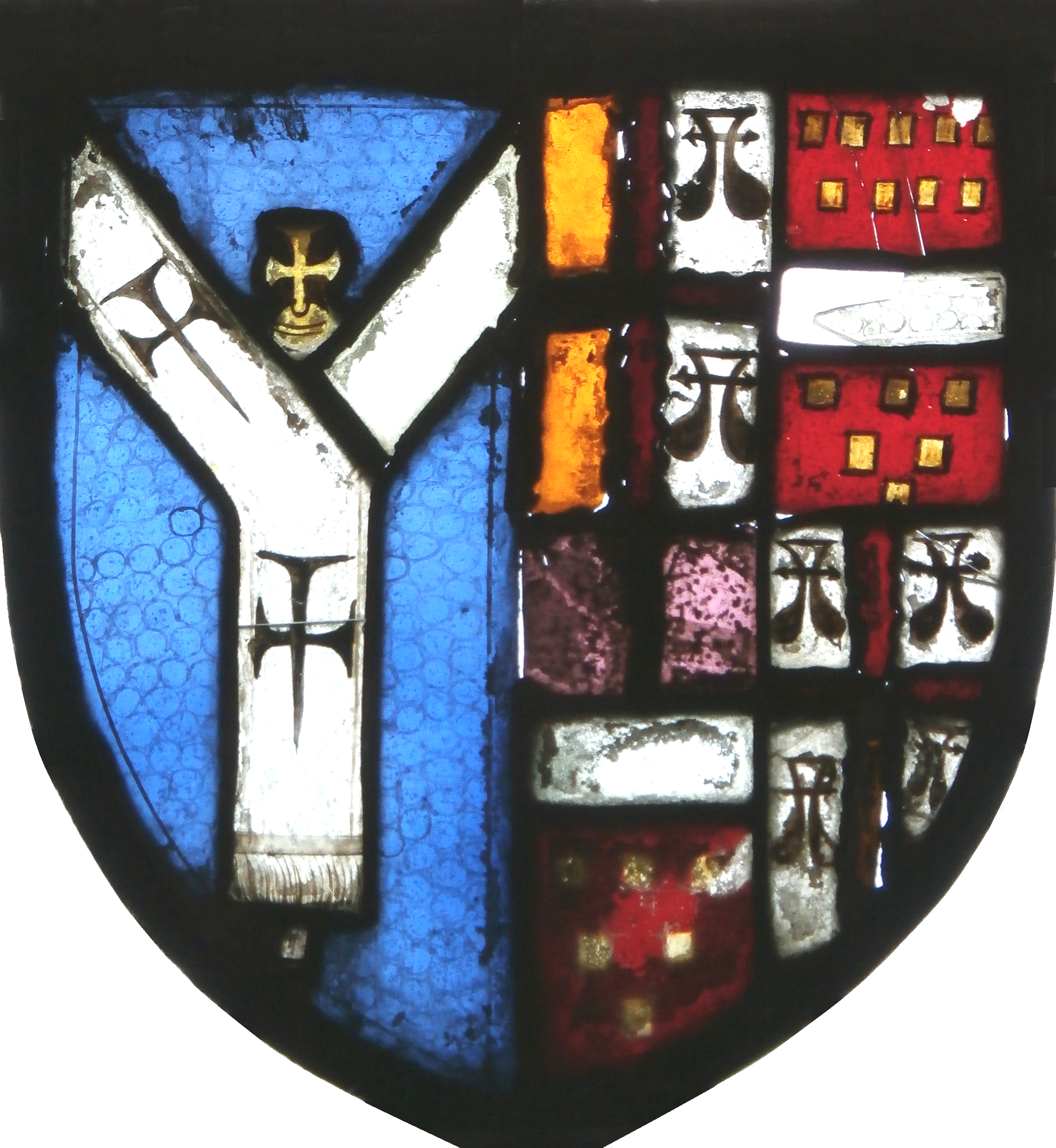
15th century heraldic stained glass relating to Bourchier family, north aisle, west window, Tawstock Church. Left: Arms of Thomas of Woodstock, 1st Duke of Gloucester (1355–1397) (youngest son of King Edward III) quartering the arms of his father-in-law Humphrey de Bohun, 7th Earl of Hereford (1341–1373), father of his wife Eleanor de Bohun (c. 1366 – 1399): Royal Arms of England with in the 4th quarter the arms of Bohun (Azure, a bend argent cotised or between six lions rampant or); Middle: Arms of William Bourchier, 1st Count of Eu (1374–1420) (Quarterly Bourchier and Lovain) impaling arms of his father-in-law Thomas of Woodstock: Royal Arms of England, a label of three points argent for difference; Right: Arms of the See of Canterbury impaling arms of Thomas Bourchier (c. 1404 – 1486), Archbishop of Canterbury (1454–1486) (Bourchier quartering Lovain, feudal barons of Little Easton, Essex)

William Bourchier, 9th Baron FitzWarin (1407–1470)
Husband of Thomasine Hankeford, 9th Baroness FitzWarin (1423–1453), heiress of Tawstock. He was the 2nd son of William Bourchier, 1st Count of Eu (1386–1420) by his wife Anne of Gloucester (1383–1438), eldest daughter of Thomas of Woodstock, 1st Duke of Gloucester (1355–1397) (by his wife Eleanor de Bohun daughter and co-heiress of Humphrey de Bohun, 7th Earl of Hereford (1341–1373)), youngest son of King Edward III. The 15th century heraldic stained glass in the west window of the north aisle of Tawstock Church displays this ancestry of the Bourchiers, and their heirs at Tawstock the Wreys (see below) continue to quarter the arms of Bourchier, the Royal Arms of England and Bohun, visible on several of the Wrey monuments in Tawstock Church. William was summoned to Parliament as Lord FitzWarin in right of his wife and is thus deemed to have become 9th Baron FitzWarin. William Bourchier had three distinguished brothers: Henry Bourchier, 1st Earl of Essex (1404 – 4 April 1483), eldest brother; John Bourchier, 1st Baron Berners (1415–1474), younger brother; and Thomas Bourchier, (c. 1404 – 1486), Archbishop of Canterbury and a cardinal, youngest brother. His sister Eleanor Bourchier, (c. 1417 – 1474) married John de Mowbray, 3rd Duke of Norfolk. Thomasine was buried in Bampton Church, and the surviving fragments of a tomb chest there re-set into the north wall of the chancel and displaying in a row within quatrefoils Bourchier Knots alternating with water bougets of the Bourchier arms is said by Pevsner to be that of Thomasine Hankford (died 1453), wife of William Bourchier (1407–1470) William Bourchier died before 12 December 1469 and was buried in the Church of the Austin Friars in London. His will was dated at Bampton 13 February 1466/7.

Fulk Bourchier, 10th Baron FitzWarin (1445–1479) (son)
He requested in his will to be buried at Bampton near the graves of his parents. He married Elizabeth Dinham, one of the four sisters and co-heiresses of John Dynham, 1st Baron Dynham (1433–1501), KG, of Nutwell and Hartland, Devon. Elizabeth remarried to Sir John Sapcotes, and a stained glass heraldic escutcheon survives in Bampton church showing the arms of Sapcotes impaling Dinham.

John Bourchier, 1st Earl of Bath, 11th Baron FitzWarin (1470–1539) (son)
created in 1536 Earl of Bath. He married Cecilia Daubeny, daughter of Sir Giles Daubeney and heiress of her brother Henry Daubeney, 1st Earl of Bridgewater and 9th Baron Daubeny (1494–1548). His tomb, with effigies of himself, his wife and their eight children, was situated in the Bourchier Chapel of Bampton Church until its destruction after 1770

John Bourchier, 2nd Earl of Bath, 12th Baron FitzWarin (1499–1561) and 10th Baron Daubeny (son)
He inherited the title Baron Daubeny in 1548 on the death of his maternal uncle Henry Daubeney, 1st Earl of Bridgewater and 9th Baron Daubeny (1494–1548). He married three times:

- Firstly to Elizabeth (or Isabel) Hungerford, daughter of Sir Walter Hungerford (died 1516), of Farleigh, younger son of Robert Hungerford, 3rd Baron Hungerford (1428–1464). By Elizabeth he had one daughter:
  - Elizabeth Bourchier
- Secondly (before 25 May 1524) to Eleanor Manners, daughter of George Manners, 11th Baron de Ros by his wife Anne St. Leger. He and his second wife built the south aisle chapel in Tawstock Church, in which she was buried. Above the external door of the aisle are sculpted his arms impaling the arms of Manners. His children by Eleanor included:
  - John Bourchier, known by the courtesy title "Lord FitzWarin", who predeceased his father. He married his step-sister Frances Kitson (died 1586), the daughter of his father's 3rd wife from her 1st marriage to Sir Thomas Kitson (died 1540) (see below). Her monument with recumbent effigy exists in Tawstock Church and is covered by the earliest six-columned canopy in Devon. His son by Frances Kitson was William Bourchier, 3rd Earl of Bath.
  - Sir George Bourchier (died 1605), 3rd son, an English soldier who settled in Ireland and who gained there vast estates. He married Martha Howard (c. 1555 – 1598), daughter of William Howard, 1st Baron Howard of Effingham, by whom his 5th son, who was probably born and was certainly brought up in Ireland, was Henry Bourchier, 5th Earl of Bath (died 1654).
- Thirdly, on 4 December 1548, to Margaret Donnington (died 1562) daughter and sole heiress of John Donnington (died 1544) of Stoke Newington, a member of the Worshipful Company of Salters, by his wife Elizabeth Pye. Margaret Donnington was the widow successively of Sir Thomas Kitson (died 1540), the builder of Hengrave Hall in Suffolk, and next of Sir Richard Long (died 1546) of Wiltshire, Great Saxham and Shingay, Cambridgeshire, Gentleman of the Privy Chamber to King Henry VIII. Margaret Donnington was a strong-minded lady who insisted that at the same time as her marriage to Bourchier, his son and heir should marry her own daughter Frances Kitson. The double marriage took place at Hengrave on 11 December 1548. Thus the 2nd Earl's eldest son from his 2nd marriage to Eleanor Manners, John Bourchier, Lord FitzWarin (who predeceased his father), married his own step-sister, Francesca Kitson, and was by her the father of William Bourchier, 3rd Earl of Bath. Margaret Donnington and Bourchier made Hengrave their home and Bourchier was buried at Hengrave with his wife in a significant marble tomb. Stained glass in the cloister of Hengrave Hall survives memorialising the Bourchier residency, showing ten quarterings of Bourchier (Bourchier, Louvaine, FitzWarin, Audley, Cogan, Hankford, Brewer, (Note: Per Rokewood, p.219: Gules, two bendlets wavy or. In this 7th position are shown elsewhere the arms of Stapledon (of Annery, Monkleigh): Argent, two bars wavy sable, e.g. on monument of Lady Frances Bourchier (d.1612) in the Earl of Bedford's Chenies Chapel, Bucks. (www.middlesex-heraldry.org.uk) and sculpted on gatehouse of Tawstock Court, Devon) Martin, Dinham, Arches) impaling Donnington (Argent, three pallets azure on a chief gules three bezants)

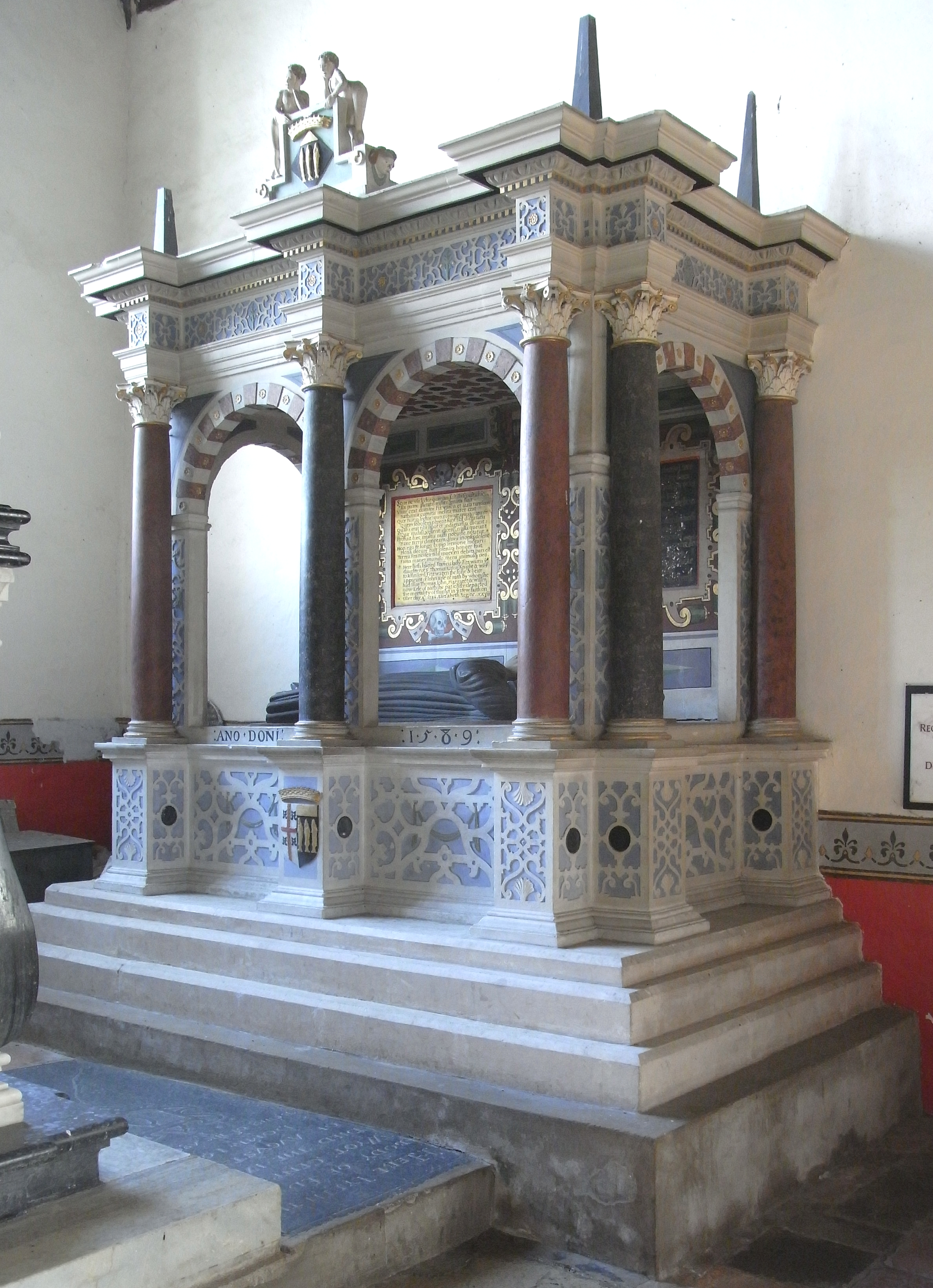
1589 monument to Frances Kitson (died 1586) "Lady FitzWarren", mother of 3rd Earl of Bath. South aisle, St Peter's Church, Tawstock

William Bourchier, 3rd Earl of Bath, 13th Baron FitzWarin, 11th Baron Daubeny (bef. 1557–1623) (grandson)
Son of John Bourchier, "Lord FitzWarin" (1529–1556) (by his wife Frances Kitson), who predeceased his own father). By his time the family had its main seat at Tawstock, and in the church there the 3rd Earl is buried and where survives his tomb and effigy. He married Elizabeth Russell, daughter of Francis Russell, 2nd Earl of Bedford (died 1585)
The monument erected in 1589 to Frances Kitson (died 1586) "Lady FitzWarren", mother of the 3rd Earl of Bath survives in the south aisle of St Peter's Church, Tawstock. It consists of a recumbent effigy covered by the earliest six-columned canopy in Devon with strapwork decoration.

Edward Bourchier, 4th Earl of Bath, 14th Baron FitzWarin, 12th Baron Daubeny (1590–1636) (son)
He died leaving three daughters and one son, William (11 Apr 1624 – 19 Feb 1689) who refused the Earldom, which them went to his cousin, Henry Bourchier who became the 5th Earl of Bath. Henry Was the son of George Bourchier, who was the son of John Bourchier, 2nd Earl of Bath.

Henry Bourchier, 5th Earl of Bath (1593–1654)
His father's second cousin and heir male. He was the fifth son of Sir George Bourchier (died 1605) (third son of the 2nd Earl), an English soldier who settled in Ireland and who gained there vast estates. Henry's mother was Martha Howard (c. 1555 – 1598), daughter of William Howard, 1st Baron Howard of Effingham. He was probably born and was certainly brought up in Ireland, where his father had gained vast estates. He married Rachael Fane (1612/13–1680), fifth daughter of Francis Fane, 1st Earl of Westmorland (1580–1629), but produced no children and on his death the Earldom of Bath became extinct. Rachel erected in the south aisle chapel of Tawstock Church a large monument (deemed "splendid" by Pevsner, "massive and ugly" by Hoskins and "almost unequalled in singularity and absurdity" by Marland) to her husband, consisting of a free standing base of black and white marble on which sit four white marble dogs supporting on their shoulders a big black square bulging sarcophogus. On each of the four corners is a black obelisk. Rachel's own monument stands next to that of her husband in Tawstock Church, given by the Diocese of Bath and Wells.

=== Wrey ===
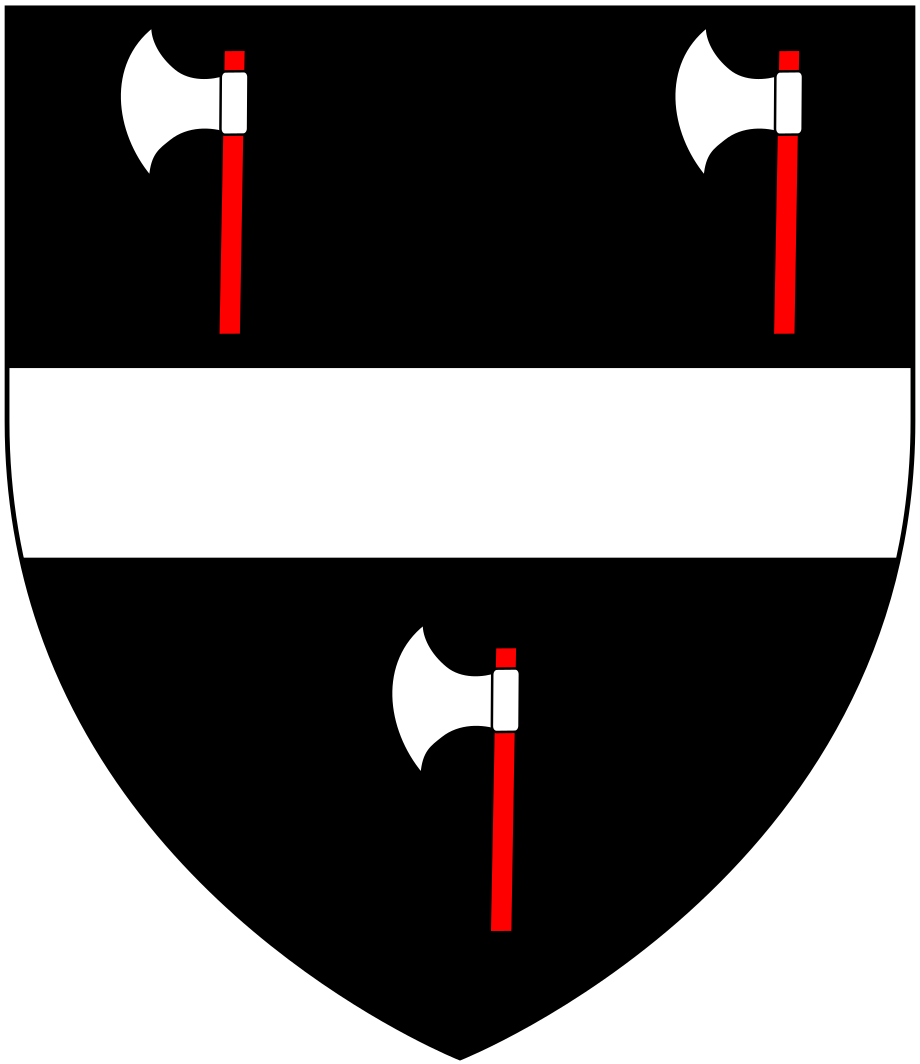
Arms of Wrey of Trebeigh, Cornwall, and Tawstock, Devon: Sable, a fesse between three pole-axes argent helved gules

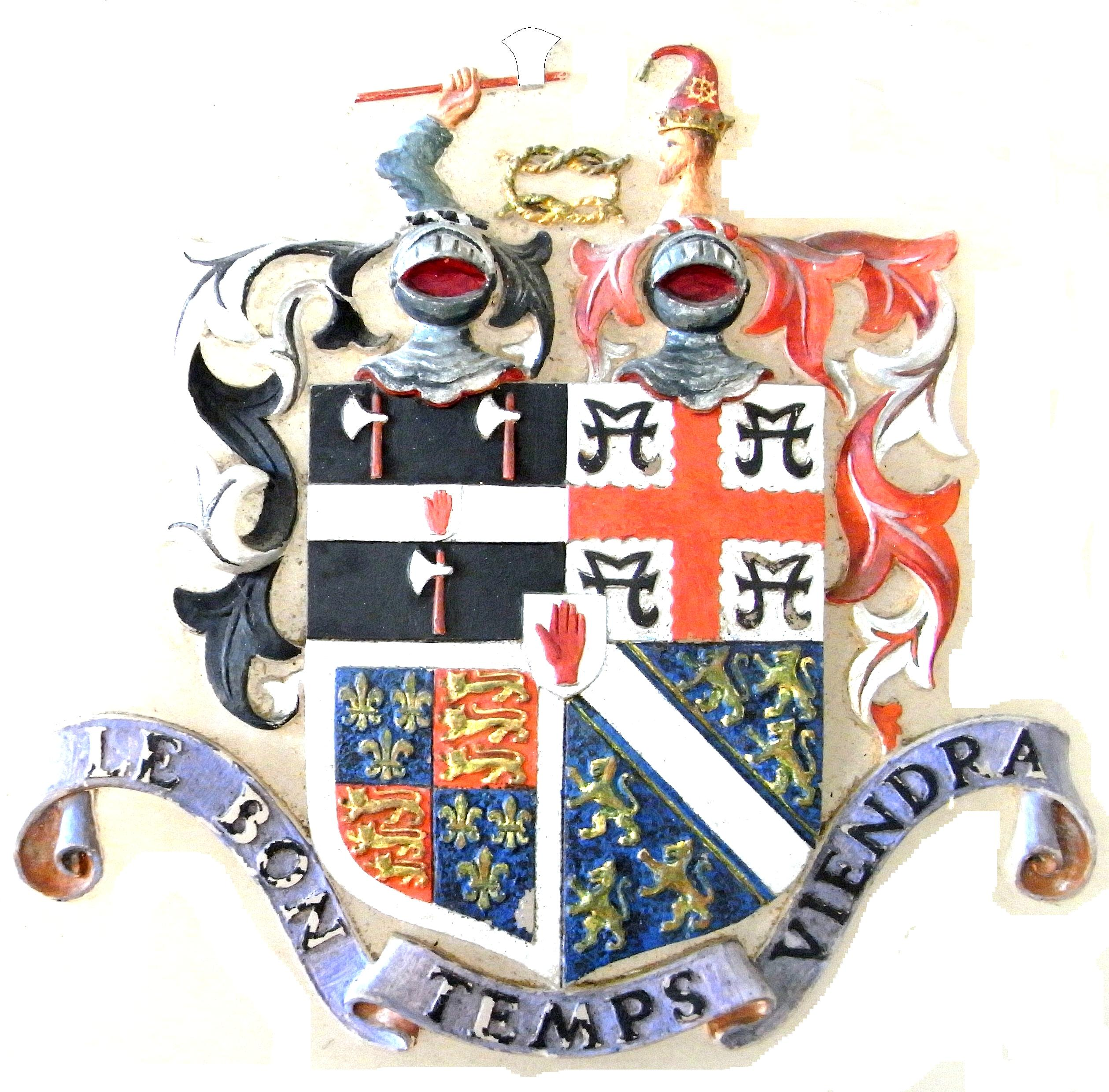
Arms of Wrey Baronets, with quarterings and crests, shown on mural monument in Tawstock Church to Sir Philip Bourchier Sherard Wrey, 12th Baronet. (Note: The arms are blazoned thus: Quarterly: 1st: Sable, a fesse between three pole-axes argent helved gules (Wrey); 2nd: Bourchier; 3rd: Within a bordure argent Plantagenet; 4th: de Bohun. Over-all is the Red Hand of Ulster. The last two quarterings refer to the wife of William Bourchier, 1st Count of Eu (died 1420), namely Anne of Gloucester, Countess of Stafford, the daughter of the Plantagenet prince, Thomas of Woodstock, 1st Duke of Gloucester (youngest son of King Edward III) by his wife Eleanor de Bohun elder daughter and coheiress of Humphrey de Bohun, 7th Earl of Hereford (1341–1373), Earl of Essex and Northampton. Above the shield in the centre is a Bourchier knot or. Above to the dexter is the crest of Wrey: A cubit arm embowed holding a pole-axe argent helved gules, on the sinister side is the crest of Bourchier: A man's head in profile proper ducally crowned or with a pointed cap gules On a scroll underneath the motto of Bourchier: Le Bon Temps Viendra ("The right time will come"))

The heir of the Bourchiers was the Wrey family of Trebeigh Manor, St Ive, Cornwall. On the death of Henry Bourchier, 5th Earl of Bath (died 1654), the last in the male line, the title became extinct. The co-heiresses to the Bourchier lands became the three daughters of his first cousin once removed Edward Bourchier, 4th Earl of Bath (1590–1636). The 3rd daughter, Lady Anne Bourchier (1631-?), married firstly James Cranfield, 2nd Earl of Middlesex, the issue of which marriage was soon extinct and secondly to Sir Chichester Wrey, 3rd Baronet (1628–1668), whose descendants inherited the principal Bourchier seat of Tawstock. The Devon biographer John Prince (died 1723) stated that in his day the most part of Bampton remained the posterity of the former Earls of Bath and was the "noble seat" of Lady Wrey, dowager of Sir Bourchier Wrey, 4th Baronet (died 1696).

The descent of Tawstock in the Wrey family was as follows:

Sir Chichester Wrey, 3rd Baronet (1628–1668)
In 1654 he married, as her second husband, the heiress of Tawstock, Holne, Ilfracombe (Note: Ilfracombe had been the dowry of Elizabeth Cogan (died 1397), heiress of the feudal barony of Bampton and wife of Fulk FitzWarin, 5th Baron FitzWarin (1362–1391), son of the heiress of Tawstock Margaret Audley, 3rd daughter and co-heiress of James Audley, 2nd Baron Audley (died 1386) (Cokayne, The Complete Peerage, new edition, vol. V, p.500-1; p.503, note (a))) and other manors, Lady Anne Bourchier (1631-?), third daughter of Edward Bourchier, 4th Earl of Bath (1590–1636). Sir Chichester fought for the Royalists during the Civil War and after the Restoration of the Monarchy of 1660 became MP for Lostwithiel in Cornwall and was Colonel of the Duke of York's Regiment.

Sir Bourchier Wrey, 4th Baronet (c. 1653 – 1696) (son)
He was also like his father Colonel of the Duke of York's Regiment. He served as MP for Liskeard, Cornwall from 1678 to 1679 and from 1689 to 1696 and for Devon in 1685. He was a noted duellist and died in 1696 from wounds suffered in a duel fought at Falmouth in 1694 with the MP for St. Ives, James Praed (died 1706). In 1681 he married Florence Rolle, daughter of Sir John Rolle (1626–1706) of Stevenstone, near Great Torrington, Devon, Sheriff of Devon in 1682 and one of the largest landowners in Devon. A mural monument exists in St Peter's Church, Tawstock to Florence's mother, Florence Rolle (died 1705), daughter and sole heiress of Denys Rolle (1614–1638) of Stevenstone and wife of Sir John Rolle (died 1706) of Marhayes. It was erected by her daughter Margaret Rolle, a spinster and sister of Florence Rolle (Lady Wrey), the widow of Sir Bourchier Wrey, 4th Baronet (died 1696). Mural monuments to the 4th Baronet and his wife exist in Tawstock Church.

Sir Bourchier Wrey, 5th Baronet (c. 1683 – 1726) (son)
who married, as her second husband, his first cousin Diana Rolle (born 1683), a daughter of his uncle John Rolle (died 1689) of Stevenstone.

Sir Bourchier Wrey, 6th Baronet (c. 1715 – 1784) (son)
He was a Jacobite sympathiser. He made his Grand Tour in 1737–40 and in 1742 was elected to the Society of Dilettanti. He served as MP for Barnstaple in 1747 and went to Bremen, Hamburg and Lübeck in 1752 as a delegate for the "Society for Carrying on the Herring Fishery". In 1760 he rebuilt the pier at Ilfracombe, originally built by the Bourchiers, and established better arrangements for English fishermen in Bremen, Hamburg, Lübeck and Copenhagen.

A "stately" (Pevsner) monument to the 6th Baronet exists in the south transept of Tawstock Church, being a plain free-standing urn on a big square pedestal, railed off by iron railings.

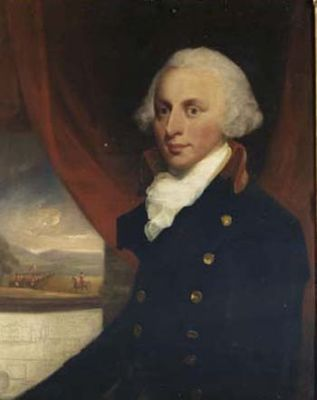
Sir Bourchier Wrey, 7th Baronet (1757–1826). 1787 portrait by Gilbert Stuart (1755–1828)

Sir Bourchier Wrey, 7th Baronet (1757–1826)
His first wife whom he married in 1786 was Anne Palk (c. 1763 – 1791), a daughter of Sir Robert Palk, 1st Baronet (1717–1798) of Haldon in South Devon, a wealthy officer of the East India Company. In 1787 Tawstock Court was destroyed by fire, and the 7th baronet took the opportunity in 1789 to rebuild the former Tudor mansion in the fashionable new gothic style, (deemed by Hoskins "remarkably ugly") with the assistance of the architect Sir John Soane. It is of similar appearance to nearby Hartland Abbey, especially as regards the castellated parapet which rises to a central pediment, rebuilt in 1779 by its then owner Paul Orchard. In 1793 he remarried to Ann Osborne, daughter of John Osborne.

Sir Bourchier Palk Wrey, 8th Baronet (1788–1879)
His father's only son by his first marriage, in 1818 he married Ellen Caroline O'Brien the nanny of his sister's children, whose husband had gone missing, presumed dead. The husband "had the bad taste to turn up again" (Lauder), thereby invalidating the marriage, and died in 1828, four after which Sir Bourchier remarried her. He had by her a daughter Ellen Caroline Wrey (1819–1866). He married secondly in 1843 to Eliza Coles a daughter of one of the lodge-keepers of the Tawstock estate, who had been lady's maid to his first wife. Despite the above, no evidence was ever adduced to prove that the marriage of 1818 was bigamous. In 1879, on the death of the 8th Baronet, the personal representatives of Ellen Caroline Weld (née Wrey) sued for her portion and won their case, which they would not have done had she been illegitimate. The whole issue was then exhaustively considered by the Committee for Privileges of The House of Lords in 1914, which determined that Ellen Caroline's eldest son, Reginald Joseph Weld, was coheir to the Baronies of Martin and Fitzwaryn, which he would not have been had she been illegitimate. It is of course also impossible to prove that the marriage of 1818 was not bigamous, but the presumption in law is that all public acts, including marriages, are duly and lawfully performed unless the contrary be shown.

Rev. Sir Henry Bourchier Wrey, 9th Baronet (1797–1882)
Half-brother of the 8th baronet, son by father's second wife), Rector of Tawstock. He married his first cousin Ellen Toke (1801–1864), daughter of Nicholas Toke (1764–1837) of Godinton House in Kent, by his wife Anna Maria Wrey, a daughter of the 6th baronet. He died at Corffe, a house on the estate.

Sir Henry Bourchier Toke Wrey, 10th Baronet (1829–1900) (son)
He attended Trinity College, Oxford. In 1854 he married Marianne Sherard, daughter of Philip Castel Sherard, 9th Baron Sherard (1804–1886). He served as High Sheriff of Devon in 1891, and as Deputy Lieutenant and JP and was a major in the 4th Battalion, Devonshire Regiment. In 1885 he sold the former Bourchier manor of Holne on the River Dart to Hon. Richard Maitland Westenra Dawson (1845–1914), 3rd son of Richard Dawson, 1st Earl of Dartrey. In the same year of 1885 he made substantial improvements to Tawstock Court, most notably to the two long wings extending westwards, forming a long narrow courtyard, which received terracotta mullioned windows and dressings, probably made at Lauder & Smith's Barnstaple pottery. He also added a western gatehouse to close off this western courtyard, with terracotta datestone "1885" above the arched gateway.

Sir Robert Bourchier Sherard Wrey, 11th Baronet (1855–1917) (son)
He served in the Royal Navy, seeing action in the 1882 Anglo-Egyptian War and with the Naval Brigade landed in the Third Anglo-Burmese War. He retired from the service with the rank of captain, and later served as the honorary lieutenant-colonel of the Royal North Devon Hussars. He married Jessie Fraser, daughter of William Thomson Fraser and granddaughter of John Fraser, of Mongewell Park, Oxfordshire. He left no sons, only a daughter Rachel Wrey (1911–1991), wife of John Henry Peyto Verney, 20th Baron Willoughby de Broke (1896–1986). He was the last to live at Tawstock Court and "to keep house in the old manner" (Lauder) and moved to Corffe a nearby house on the estate, having let the Court.

Sir Philip Bourchier Sherard Wrey, 12th Baronet (1858–1936), CBE (younger brother)
In 1919 he sold 2,500 acres of the estate for £67,000, leaving some 7,000 acres remaining. In 1889 he married Alice Mary Borton, daughter of Captain Borton, but left only two daughters. In 1924 he erected against the east wall of the north transept of Tawstock Church the large monument formerly in St Ive Church near Callington, Cornwall of his ancestor Sir John Wrey (died 1597) and his wife.

Rev. Sir Albany Bourchier Sherard Wrey, 13th Baronet (1861–1948) (younger brother)
He attended Hertford College, Oxford and was Rector of Tawstock and a JP for Devon. In World War I he received the Reserve Decoration, Barnstaple, 1912–18 and was Chaplain to the Royal North Devon Hussars. He was a member of the Devon County Education Committee and was Chairman of the Barnstaple division of the RDC 1916–48. He was awarded the Silver Jubilee Medal in 1935 and the Coronation Medal in 1937. In 1896 he married Isabel Frances Sophia Fleet, daughter of Thomas Horn Fleet, but died childless. In about 1940 he let Tawstock Court to St Michael's Preparatory School.

Sir (Castel Richard) Bourchier Wrey, 14th Baronet (1903–1991) (nephew)
Son of Edward Castell Wrey, 7th son of 10th Bt., he inherited about 7,000 acres, forming the nucleus of the former larger estate. He lived at Webbery, near Bideford, about 4 1/4 miles SW of Tawstock Court. In 1973 he moved to South Africa, his wife's country of origin, and in the 1970s sold Tawstock Court to its tenant St Michael's School and sold most of the remaining land.

Sir George Richard Bourchier Wrey, 15th Baronet (born 1948) (son)
He inherited only a farmhouse with a few hundred acres, and in 2002 was running a family property business, entirely unconnected with the former Wray estates. St Michael's School continued to occupy Tawstock Court until 2012 when it became insolvent and went into administration, upon which the preparatory school closed. On 17 July 2012 the property with 32 acres was purchased for an undisclosed sum from the administrator Grant Thornton UK LLP, joint administrators of St Michael's School Tawstock Ltd., by Mr Rik Peryer, a property investor and developer, as a private residence. As part of the sale the nursery school division of St Michael's School continues to operate (in 2013) in the stable blocks to the immediate west of the house.

The heir apparent to the baronetcy is Harry David Bourchier Wrey (born 1984), eldest son of the 15th Baronet.

== Sources ==
- Gray, Todd, Devon Household Accounts, 1627–59, Part II, "Henry, Fifth Earl of Bath and Rachel, Countess of Bath, 1637–1655", Devon and Cornwall Record Society, Exeter, 1996
- Gray, Todd & Rowe, Margery (Eds.), Travels in Georgian Devon: The Illustrated Journals of The Reverend John Swete, 1789–1800, 4 vols., Tiverton, 1999
- Lauder, Rosemary, Devon Families, Tiverton, 2002, pp. 151–156, Wrey of Tawstock
- Pevsner, Nikolaus & Cherry, Bridget, The Buildings of England: Devon, London, 2004.
- Pole, Sir William (died 1635), Collections Towards a Description of the County of Devon, Sir John-William de la Pole (ed.), London, 1791.
- Risdon, Tristram (died 1640), Survey of Devon. With considerable additions. London, 1811.
- Sanders, I.J., English Baronies, Oxford, 1960.
- Vivian, Lt.Col. J.L., (Ed.) The Visitations of the County of Devon: Comprising the Heralds' Visitations of 1531, 1564 & 1620. Exeter, 1895.
