= Feudal barony of Barnstaple =

English barony, established AD 1066

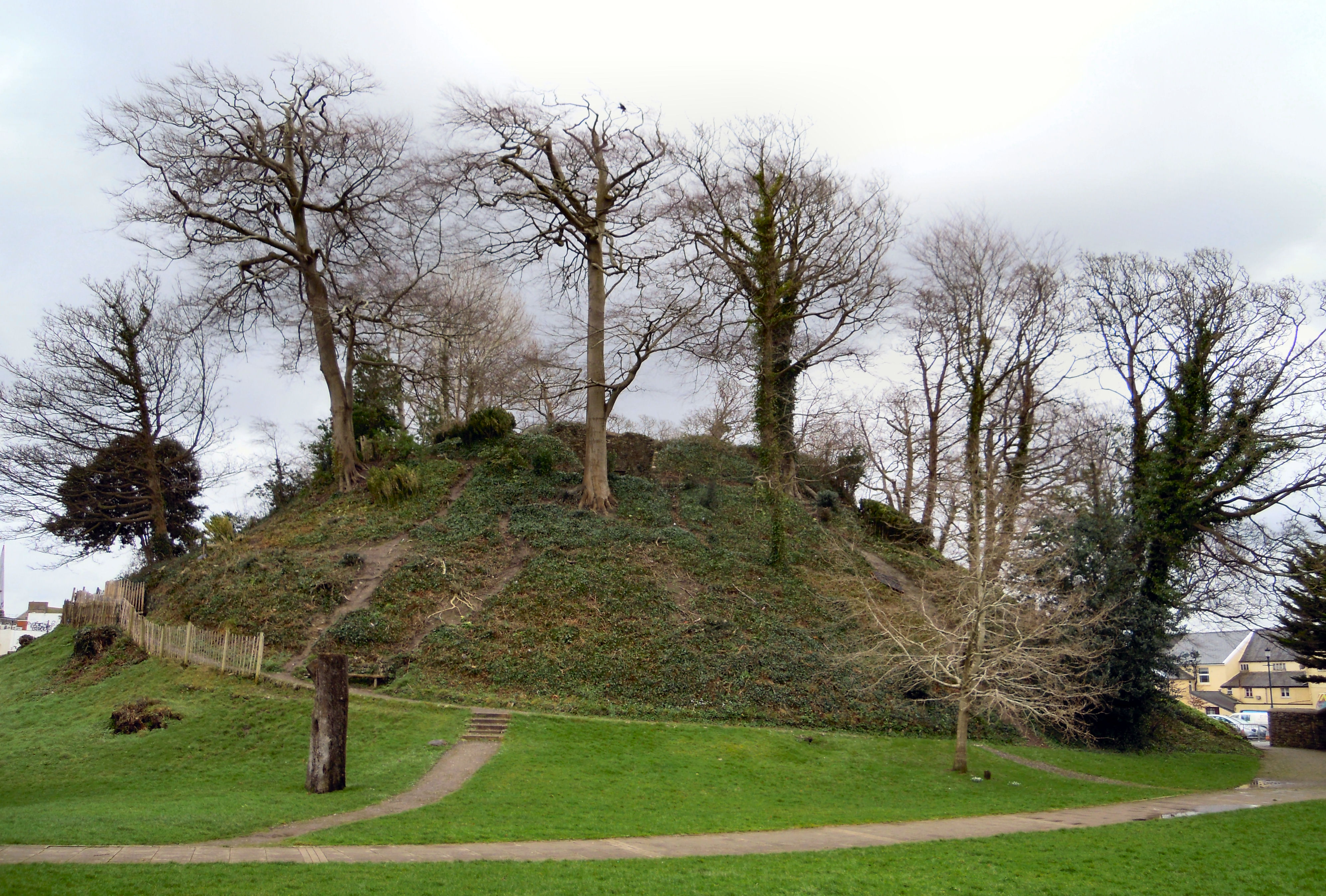
The remains of the Norman motte of Barnstaple Castle

From AD 1066, the feudal barony of Barnstaple was a large feudal barony with its caput at the town of Barnstaple in north Devon, England. It was one of eight feudal baronies in Devonshire which existed in the Middle Ages. In 1236 it comprised 56 knight's fees or individual member manors. The feudal service owed for half the barony in 1274 was the provision to the royal army of two knights or four sergeants for forty days per annum, later commuted to scutage.

== Descent ==
=== de Mowbray ===
The barony was first granted by William the Conqueror (1066–1087) to Geoffrey de Mowbray (died 1093), Bishop of Coutances, who is recorded as its holder in the Domesday Book (1086). His heir was his nephew Robert de Mowbray (died 1125), Earl of Northumberland, son of Geoffrey's brother Robert de Mowbray. In 1095 Robert II rebelled against King William II (1087–1100) and his barony escheated to the crown.

=== de Totnes ===
At some time before his death in 1100 King William II re-granted the barony of Barnstaple to Juhel de Totnes (died 1123/30), a Breton formerly feudal baron of Totnes, from which barony the king had expelled him after the death of his father William the Conqueror in 1087. In about 1107, Juhel, who had already founded Totnes Priory, founded Barnstaple Priory, of the Cluniac order, dedicated to St Mary Magdalene. Juhel's son and heir was Alfred de Totnes, who died sine prole some time before 1139, leaving two sisters as his co-heiresses each to a moiety of the barony: Aenor and a sister whose name is unknown.

=== de Braose and de Tracy moieties ===
Per party fesse gules and azure, three garbs or. These arms were attributed to William de Braose (died 1211) by Matthew Paris in Historia Anglorum, Chronica Majora, Part III (1250-59) British Library MS Royal 14 C VII f. 29v (shown there inverted to denote his death). He apparently adopted them at the start of the Age of Heraldry c. 1200–1215, but Matthew Paris's attribution may be dubious as his descendants in the Braose family bore different arms

The inheritance of the barony of Barnstaple by two co-heiresses split its possession during the period c. 1139 to 1213 into two moieties, which became re-united under the de Tracy family. The descent of the two co-heiresses was as follows:

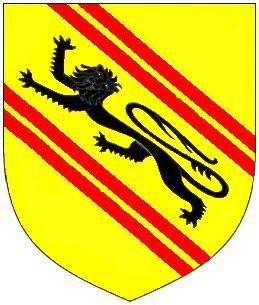
Arms of de Tracy: Or, a lion passant sable between two bends gemelles gules

- Aenor de Totnes married the Welsh Marcher Lord Philip de Braose (died 1134/55), 2nd feudal baron of Bramber, Surrey, son of William de Braose, 1st Lord of Bramber (died 1093/6). The moiety descended to her eldest son and heir William de Braose, 3rd Lord of Bramber (died c. 1193), and thence to his son William de Braose, 4th Lord of Bramber (died 1211). According to Sanders (1960) in 1208 King John (1199–1216) confiscated the lands of William de Braose (died 1211) and in 1213 granted his moiety of the barony of Barnstaple to Henry de Tracy (died 1274), the husband of his granddaughter Matilda de Braose.
- The other de Totnes sister, whose name is unknown, married Henry de Tracy (died pre-1165), leaving a son and heir Oliver de Tracy (died c. 1184), who in 1165 was charged scutage on 25 knights' fees for his moiety. In 1166 he declared 23 1/3 and in 1168 30 1/2 knights' fees. Oliver left a son and heir Oliver (died 1210), who left as his heir Henry de Tracy (died 1274), who also inherited in 1213 the other moiety as described above. Henry de Tracy (died 1274), according to Pole, had married Matilda de Braose, daughter of Reginald de Braose, son of William de Braose (died 1211). In 1236 he answered for 56 knights' fees, representing the whole barony. In 1246 he answered for 28 knights' fees formerly relating to the Braose moiety and for his 28 paternal knights' fees "of the honour of Oliver de Tracy". Pole further stated that his wife Matilda de Braose had been given the manor of Tawstock, two miles south of Barnstaple, by her childless aunt Loretta de Braose, wife of Robert FitzPernel, Earl of Leicester (i.e. Robert de Beaumont, 4th Earl of Leicester (died c. 1204)), which manor had been one of three knight's fees of the barony given as her marriage portion by her father. Thenceforth Henry de Tracy (died 1274) made Tawstock his seat.

Henry de Tracy's heir to the entire barony was his granddaughter Maud de Brian (or Briene) (died pre-1279), daughter of Guy de Brian of Laugharne Castle, Carmarthenshire by his wife Eve de Tracy, daughter of Henry de Tracy.

=== FitzMartin ===
Arms of FitzMartin: Argent two bars gules

Maud de Brian's first husband was Nicholas FitzMartin (died 1260), who had pre-deceased his father Nicholas FitzMartin (died 1282), feudal baron of Blagdon, Somerset. Maud married secondly Geoffrey de Camville (died 1308), of Clifton Campville, Staffordshire, who had summons to attend the king at Portsmouth, with horse and arms, to embark in the expedition then proceeding to Gascony. He was subsequently summoned to parliament as Baron Camville, of Clifton, in the county of Stafford, from 23 June 1295 to 22 February 1307. Camville survived her by about 29 years during which time he retained possession of the barony under the curtesy of England.

The barony was recovered on Geoffrey's death by Maud's son William Martin (died 1324) whose son and heir William FitzMartin died childless in 1326.

=== Audley ===
Arms of Audley: Gules a fret or.

The heirs of William Martin (died 1326) were his surviving sister Eleanor Martin (died 1342), who died without children, albeit having married twice, and James Audley, 2nd Baron Audley (died 1386), the son of his other sister Joan Martin (died 1322), by her second husband Nicholas Audley, 1st Baron Audley (died 1316) of Heleigh Castle, Staffordshire. James Audley thus in 1342 inherited his childless aunt Eleanor's moiety of the barony of Barnstaple, giving him possession of the whole. On the death of James Audley, 2nd Baron Audley (1313–1386) in 1386 the barony of Barnstaple passed to his son, Nicholas Audley, 3rd Baron Audley (c. 1328 – 1391), who died without issue. His co-heiresses were his two full-sisters, Joan and Margaret and his half-sister Margaret and their descendants:

- Joan Audley (1331–1393) who married Sir John Tuchet (1327–1371). Their son was John Tuchet, 4th Baron Audley and 1st Baron Tuchet.
- Margaret Audley (born before 1351, died 1411), married Sir Roger Hillary.

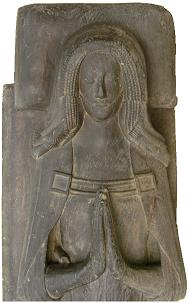
Detail from oak wood effigy of Margaret Audley (died 1373), wife of Fulk FitzWarin, 4th Baron FitzWarin (1341–1374) and heiress of a moiety of the feudal barony of Barnstaple, including the later capital manor of Tawstock. Effigy formerly in Tawstock Church under a recessed arch in wall of north chancel, now in Museum of Barnstaple and North Devon

- Margaret Audley (died 1373), who married Fulk FitzWarin, 4th Baron FitzWarin (1341–1374) of Whittington Castle, Shropshire and Alveston, Gloucestershire. In 1392 Margaret's 3-year-old grandson Fulk FitzWarin, 6th Baron FitzWarin (1389–1407), feudal baron of Bampton, Devon, inherited the manor of Tawstock in Devon, 2 miles south of Barnstaple, thought to have been a later seat of the feudal barons of Barnstaple, but which had certainly been a possession of Judhael and later of de Braose, and which had been settled in 1370 by James Audley, 2nd Baron, in tail male successively to his three sons from his 2nd marriage, Thomas, Roland and James, who all died without male issue. The later heir of the FitzWarins was the Bourchier family, Earls of Bath and Barons FitzWarin, who made Tawstock their seat and were highly influential in Barnstaple society and politics. They also inherited via the Audleys other manors formerly part of the barony of Barnstaple, including Nymet Tracy, St Marychurch, Kingston, Marwood, Upexe and Creedy Wiger. The Bourchier Barnstaple townhouse is thought to be no. 62 Boutport Street, with its surviving ornate plaster barrel-ceilings dated 1620 (or 1629), showing the arms of Bourchier, which survives next to the Royal and Fortescue Hotel, and was converted in about 1760 to premises of the "Golden Lion" coaching inn. It was converted to premises for the National Westminster Bank in 1936, in 1991 housed a branch of the Woolwich Building Society and in 2014 is a restaurant.

=== King Richard II ===
James Audley, 2nd Baron Audley (died 1386) during his life had settled the feudal barony of Barnstaple by means of an entail on his heirs male, with remainder to the crown. As all his sons from his two marriages died without male issue, the barony thus became the inheritance of King Richard II (1377–1399), who granted the barony firstly to Robert de Vere, who however was attainted in 1388, when it escheated to the crown. King Richard II then granted it to his half-brother John Holland, 1st Duke of Exeter (c. 1352–1400), in tail-male. Audley had also been feudal baron of Dartington, inherited from the Martin family, and this too passed to the crown and was similarly granted to the Duke of Exeter. The feudal barony of Great Torrington was also similarly granted. Holland was loyal to Richard II, and following the latter's deposition by Henry Bolingbroke in 1399, later King Henry IV (1399–1413), Holland rebelled and was executed in 1400. The barony passed to his eldest son, Richard Holland (c. 1390 – 1400), who died later the same year.

From 1425 the barony was held by John Holland, 2nd Duke of Exeter (c. 1395 – 1447), son and heir of the 1st Duke. On his death in 1447 it passed to his son Henry Holland, 3rd Duke of Exeter (1430–1475), who was attainted in 1461 whereupon his possessions were granted to his wife, Anne of York (1439–1476), the second child and eldest surviving daughter of Richard Plantagenet, 3rd Duke of York and an elder sister of Kings Edward IV and Richard III. She divorced her husband and remarried to Thomas St Leger (1440–1483), who held the lands after her death in 1476 by Courtesy of England until his beheading in 1483. In 1483 King Richard III (1483–1485) granted "the Castle and Borough of Barnstaple" to Thomas Everingham, who held it until King Henry VII (1485–1509) deposed Richard III in 1485 and two years later granted it to his mother, Margaret Beaufort.

=== Queen Mary I ===
Queen Mary (1553–1558) granted the barony to Thomas Marrow, MP, though apparently shorn of all its constituent fees and manors, held thenceforth by their tenants directly from the crown as tenants-in-chief. Thus the feudal barony was now one in name only, with no substantial constituent lands or tenants, and conferred no right on its holder of taking a seat in parliament.

=== Castle Manor ===
This so-called "castle-manor" was soon after acquired from "Samuel Marowe" by Sir John Chichester (died 1569) of Raleigh, in the parish of Pilton just over the River Yeo from Barnstaple, and several leases were granted by him to townspersons of orchards gardens and houses within the walls of the castle. In 1566 Sir John Chichester assigned to the Mayor, Corporation and Burgesses of Barnstaple all his rights and interests in the Manor of Barnstaple. He remained however as lord of the manor of "Castle Court" and as part of the agreement under which he relinquished some of his rights, the corporation was obliged to provide for him two annual "fish dinners". Later this was voluntarily relinquished by his descendant on condition that the Corporation paid instead two annuities of 20 shillings each to various charities in Barnstaple. The ancient "Manor of Hogsfee/Hoggfee" etc. appears to have been connected with the castle manor. In 1732 the Mayor and Aldermen acquired 1/3 of it from John Carew and in 1734 the remaining 2/3 from Thomas Saltren and John Weddon.

== Fees in 1326 ==
The 1326 Inquisition post mortem of William FitzMartin (died 1326) lists his fees pertaining to the Barony of Barnstaple as follows:

Name of fee	no. of knight's fees	Tenant
Hesel & Rewes (Rewe including Hazel Barton)	1	Walter Tauntefer
Essewalter (Ashwater)	1	Robert de Karnidon
Tappelegh (Tapeley)	1	Oliver de Wibbebury
Teyngcomb (Teigncombe in Chagford)	1	Oliver de Wibbebury
Heales (alias Hehales)	1/2	Oliver de Wibbebury
Pydikwell and Gratton (alias Gretton) (in High Bray)	1 1/2	Robert de Cruwes and Jordan le Vautort, co-heirs of Mauger de Sancto Albino
Boclonnd and Hurtelegh (Buckland Filleigh)	1	Thomas de Fillegh
Estboclannd (East Buckland)	1	Thomas de Fillegh
West Bray (Bray in South Molton)	1/2	Thomas de Fillegh
Bremelrugg and South Alre (Bremridge & South Aller)	1	John Tracy
Suttecombe (Sutcombe)	1	Richard de Merton
Merton	1	Richard de Merton
Hengestecote (Henscott)	1/3	Robert Crues and Jordan de Valle Torta
Pillonnd & Barlinton (Pilland and Great Barlington)	1	Walter de Pillonnd and of him by Roger de Cornu and Mabel his wife for life of Mabel
Rowesbugh (Roborough)	1	Baldwin le Fleming
wanteslegh & Ebberlegh	1/20	John de Lodehiwich
Mollond Champens (Molland-Champson)	1	John de Whiteby
Est Stodelegh (East Stoodleigh)	1/2	Robert Marchaunt, which Thomasia relict of Robert his father holds in dower
Bonelegh & Little Hampteford (Bondleigh)	2	Walter Gaboun
Hwich (Huish Beaple)	1	Robert Beaupel
Wlrington (alias Wolrington)	1/2	Matthew de Crouthorn
Estbray (East Bray)	1/4	Matthew de Crouthorn
Mortehoo (Mortehoe)	1/2	John de Hardeshull
Bitteden (Bittadon)	1	Heir of Thomas de Bitteden, a minor
Bere & Puppecote (Beara Charter)	1	Nicholas Martyn and of him by John Chatri for life
Wlrington (West Worlington)	1	Nicholas Martyn
Medeneford	1/21	John de Lodehiwish (alias Lidehewyssh)
Middleton	1	John de Wes(ton)
Hautebray (High Bray)	1	Baldwin le Flemyng
Little Bray	1/2	Baldwin le Flemyng
Matting(ho) (Martinhoe)	1	John de Penris & Philip ap Wylim
Kynewalton	3/4	John de Penris & Philip ap Wylim
Whetefeld (alias Whitfeld) (Whitefield in Highbray)	1/3	John de Penris & Philip ap Wylim
Roughlee (Rowley)	1/2	John de Penris & Philip ap Wylim
Pleystowe (Plaistow)	1	Ralph de (Esse of) Thesbergh
Ans(ty le Moygne) (Anstey)	1	Robert de Stokhey
Combe Mounceaux	1/6	Heir of Nicholas Marchaunt, a minor
Coueleye (Cowley)	1/2	Henry de Ca(mpo Arnulphi)
Colrigge (Coldridge)	1	Henry de Ca(mpo Arnulphi)
Lockesbere (Loxbeare)	1	(Thomas de Waunford)
westdoune & Dene (West Down)	1	(Philip de Columbariis)
T(helebrugge & Chatemere) (Thelbridge & Chapmoor)	1	Heir of John de Benelighe
Cloteworthy (Clotworthy)	1/14	Oliver de Clotew(orthy)
Horton	1/4	(Robert de Horton)
R(alegh & Choldecombe) (Raleigh, Pilton & Challacombe)	1	Thomas son & heir of William de Raleghe, a minor
Walworthy, Kuttenore, Trendeleshoo, Sevenash, P(acheshole, Northcote, Cambes)cote & Bridewik	5	Thomas son & heir of William de Raleghe, a minor
crakeweye (Crackaway later known as Stowford)	1/4	Robert Crus
Clistracy (Clist House)	1	Bishop of Exeter
Braunford Speke (Brampford Speke)	1/2	Robert de Curteny
Northcote Prior's (in Buckland Brewer)	1/2	Prior of Pilton in frankalmoin
Coriton (Coryton)	1	Henry de Chambernoun
Wlvelegheye	1/4	Robert Beaupiel
Aylardesford	1/20	William de Aylardesford
Little Boy (alias Bovy)	1/2	Alwardus Homaz, William le Leche & John de Pount Jordan (Punchardon)
Peadehull	1/2	Thomas de Peadehull
Nether Exe	1/2	Baldwin Flemyng
Chaggeford (Chagford)	1	Oliver de Wybbebury
Surton, Milford, North Phrisshel, Thorne, Roude, Kymworthe & Neulond (Sourton, Milford, Northrussel, Thorne, Kimworthy in Bradworthy, Newland)	2	William Spek
Combe Acastre & Combe Regni	1	"Whereof Oliver de Ess holds Combe Acastre & a certain tenant holds Combe Regni"
Croulegh (Crealy)	1	Prior of St James, Exeter, in frankalmoin
Farweye (Farway)	1	Abbot of Quarera (Quarr Abbey)in frankalmoin
Westhorwode	3/4	Walter Gamboun of Merston

== Sources ==
- Lamplugh, L., Barnstaple: Town on the Taw, 2002, Cullompton
- Pole, Sir William (died 1635), Collections Towards a Description of the County of Devon, Sir John-William de la Pole (ed.), London, 1791.
- Risdon, Tristram (died 1640), Survey of Devon. With considerable additions. London, 1811.
- Sanders, I.J., English Baronies, Oxford, 1960
