= Lords of Cemais =

Lords of Cemais - Wales - Ruling Families - 12th Century

The Lords of Cemais were the ruling families, from the early 12th century of the Marcher Lordship (a.k.a. Palatine Barony) of Kemes, and in later centuries of the barony of Cemais (Dyfed).

- Martin de Turribus, fl. 1090's.
- Robert fitz Martin, c.1095? - died c.1159
- William I FitzMartin, c.1155-1209, husband of Angharad, daughter of Rhys ap Gruffydd, prince of the briefly re-established Deheubarth.
- William II FitzMartin, 1177? -1216
- Sir Nicholas I FitzMartin, 1210–1282, who granted land in the Preseli Hills to a son of Cuhelyn the Bard, a famous poet.
- Nicholas II FitzMartin (1235 - 1285)
- William Martin, 1st Baron Martin, 1257–1324
- William, Lord Martin, 1296–1326; his sole heir was his cousin, the son of his deceased aunt, Joan, the wife of the first Baron Audley:
- James Audley, 2nd Baron Audley, 1312–1386
- Nicholas Audley, 3rd Baron Audley, c.1330-1391; title went into abeyance until being inherited by his sister's son:
- John Tuchet, 4th Baron Audley, d. 1409
- James Tuchet, 5th Baron Audley, d. 1459
- John Tuchet, 6th Baron Audley, d. 1491
- James Tuchet, 7th Baron Audley, c.1465-1497, who was executed for treason and the Marcher Lorship forfeit. It was eventually re-established as a Barony, in the year of the Laws in Wales Acts (which abolished all Marcher Lordships), for his son:
- John Tuchet, 8th Baron Audley, d. 1558, who sold it in 1539 to
- William Owen, c. 1488–1574, a local lawyer
- George Owen, 1552–1613
- Alban Owen, 1580–1656
- David Owen, fl. 1651
- William Owen, c.1654-1721
- Elizabeth Owen, d. 1746
- Anne Owen, d. c.1720?
- William Lloyd, d. 1734
- Anne Lloyd, c. 1715-1775
- Colonel Thomas Lloyd, 1740–1807
- Thomas Lloyd, 1788–1845
- Sir Thomas Davies Lloyd, bart., 1820–1877
- Sir Marteine Lloyd, bart., 1851–1933
- Nesta Lloyd Withington, d.1943
- Morfa Withington Winser, 1920–1958
- Joan Gregson Ellis, d. 1973
- Hyacinthe Hawkesworth, married John Hawkesworth in 1943, d. 2011

Heir presumptative: John Phillip Cemaes Hawkesworth, 1947–2006

- Alexander Hawkesworth, b 1984
