= Margaret Audley (FitzWarin) =

English heiress (??–1373)

The Right Honourable; The Lady FitzWarin
- Baroness FitzWarin
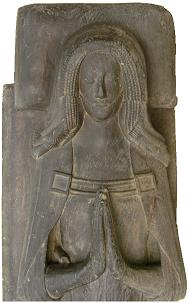
- Detail from oak wood effigy believed to represent Lady Margaret II Audley, formerly in Tawstock Church under a recessed arch in wall of north chancel, now in the Museum of Barnstaple and North Devon
- Born: Margaret Audley
- Died: 1373; Devon, England
- Spouse: Fulk VIII FitzWarin
- Issue: Fulk IX FitzWarin
- Parents: James Audley; Isabel LeStrange

Arms of Audley: Gules a fret or.

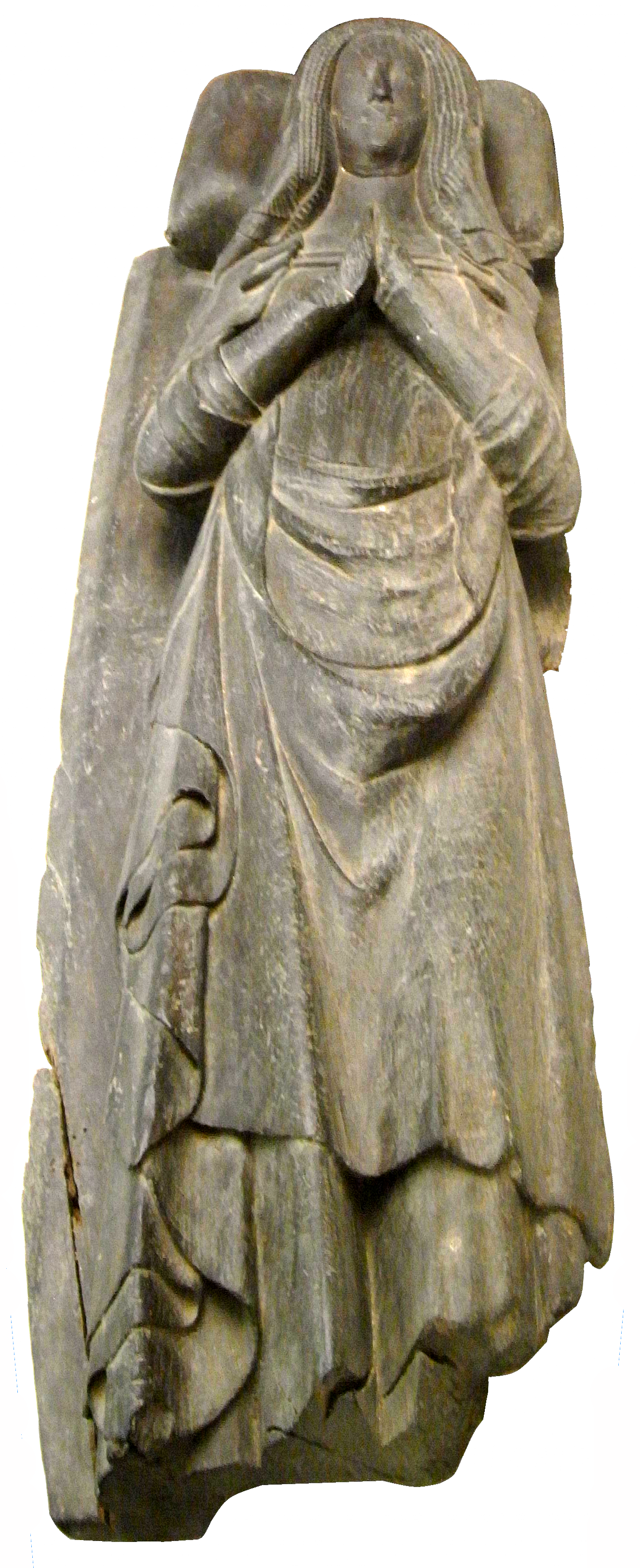
Margaret Audley, her supposed effigy in the Museum of Barnstaple and North Devon

Margaret II Audley (died 1373) was a co-heiress to the feudal barony of Barnstaple in Devon, England.

== Origins ==
Margaret was a daughter of James Audley, 2nd Baron Audley (1312/13–1386), seated at the manor of Tawstock, feudal baron of Barnstaple, by his second wife Isabel LeStrange, daughter of Roger le Strange, 5th Baron Strange (c. 1327–1382) of Knokyn. In 1370 James Audley settled the manor of Tawstock in tail male successively to his three sons from his second marriage, thus Margaret's brothers, Thomas, Rodeland and James, who all died childless. On the death of James Audley in 1386 the barony of Barnstaple, including two thirds of the manor of Tawstock, passed to his surviving son (from his first marriage) Nicholas Audley, 3rd Baron Audley (c.1328–1391), who died childless. Nicholas's co-heiresses were his two full-sisters Joan and Margaret I and his half-sister Margaret II, who inherited Tawstock:

- Joan Audley (1331–1393) who married Sir John Tuchet (1327–1371),
- Margaret I Audley (pre-1351–1410/11), who married Sir Roger Hillary,
- Margaret II Audley, his half-sister, who, according to William Pole, inherited Tawstock by a special entail, wife of Fulk VIII FitzWarin, 4th Baron FitzWarin (1341–1374)

== Inheritance ==
The lands which descended via Lady Margaret Audley to the FitzWarins and Bourchiers included:

- Tawstock
- Nymet Tracy,
- St Marychurch,
- Kingston,
- Marwood,
- Upexe
- Creedy Wiger, near Crediton

== Marriage and children ==
Arms of FitzWarin: Quarterly per fess indented argent and gules

Margaret II Audley married Fulk VIII FitzWarin, 4th Baron FitzWarin (1341–1374). The FitzWarin family were powerful Marcher Lords seated at Whittington Castle in Shropshire and at Alveston in Gloucestershire. The title Baron FitzWarin was created by writ of summons for Fulk V FitzWarin in 1295. (For the descendants of Margaret Audley see Manor of Tawstock.) her son is Fulk FitzWarin, 5th Baron FitzWarin (1365–1391) who married Elizabeth Cogan granddaughter of Neil Loring. elizabeth married secondly Hugh Courtenay (died 1425)

== Death and burial ==
Margaret died in 1373 and it is believed that she is represented by the oak effigy of a recumbent lady formerly in a niche in the north wall of St Peter's Church, Tawstock, from where it was removed to the Museum of Barnstaple and North Devon in Barnstaple.

== Sources ==
- Lauder, Rosemary, Devon Families, Tiverton, 2002, pp. 151–156, Wrey of Tawstock, p. 152
- Sanders, I.J., English Baronies, Oxford, 1960, p. 104, Barony of Barnstaple
- Vivian, Lt.Col. J.L., (Ed.) The Visitations of the County of Devon: Comprising the Heralds' Visitations of 1531, 1564 & 1620, Exeter, 1895, p. 552, pedigree of Martyn, Barons of Barnstaple
