= William Martin, 1st Baron Martin =

English noble

Coat of arms of William Martin, 1st Baron Martin, Argent, two bars gules.

William Martin, 1st Baron Martin (died 1324), Lord of Cemais and Barnstaple was an English noble. He fought in the wars in Wales, Gascony, Flanders and Scotland. He was a signatory of the Baron's Letter to Pope Boniface VIII in 1301.

== Biography ==
William was the eldest son of Nicholas Martin and Maud de Brain. He served in Wales, Gascony, Flanders in 1297 and in Scotland. William took part in the battle of Falkirk on 22 July 1298. He was a signatory of the Baron's Letter to Pope Boniface VIII in 1301.

He died in 1324 and was succeeded by his second son William. His eldest son Edmund pre-deceased him.

== Marriages and issue ==
William married firstly Eleanor, the widow of John de Mohun, she was a daughter of Reginald FitzPiers and Joan de Vivonia.

They had the following children:

- Edmund Martin, married Margaret Hastings, the daughter of John Hastings, 1st Baron Hastings and Isabel de Valence. He died without any surviving children.
- William Martin, married Joan Hastings and died in 1326, without any surviving children. See Lords of Cemais.
- Eleanor Martin, married firstly Philip Colombers of Nether Stowey and heir to John de Columbers and Alice, daughter and co-heiress of Stephen de Penshurst, and secondly William de Hastings son of John Hastings, 1st Baron Hastings and Isabel de Valence.
- Joan Martin, married firstly Henry de Lacy, Earl of Lincoln and secondly Nicholas d'Audley, 1st Lord Audley. Nicholas and Joan had James Audley, 2nd Baron Audley and all the family baronies were inherited by James.

William married secondly Amicia, widow of Henry de Pomeroy, Baron of Berry Pomeroy, she was a daughter of Geoffrey de Camville.

=== Extinction of the Martin - FitzMartin lineage ===
The Martin line ceased to exist after the death of Edmund and William, Eleanor died without issue, and the titles revered to the heirs of Joan Martin.

William's eldest son inherited the family property and, via his marriage with Angharad, regained the lost territory of Kemes/Cemais. The family would continue to hold lands in both England and Wales until the extinction of the senior line in 1326. Cadet lines still flourish in England, Wales, Ireland and beyond.

== See also ==
- Robert fitz Martin

== Citations ==
Preceded by Nicholas II FitzMartin	Lord of Cemais before 1115–c. 1159	Succeeded by William fitz Martin
