= Bourchier Wrey =

Captain Sir Bourchier Wrey Bt DL JP
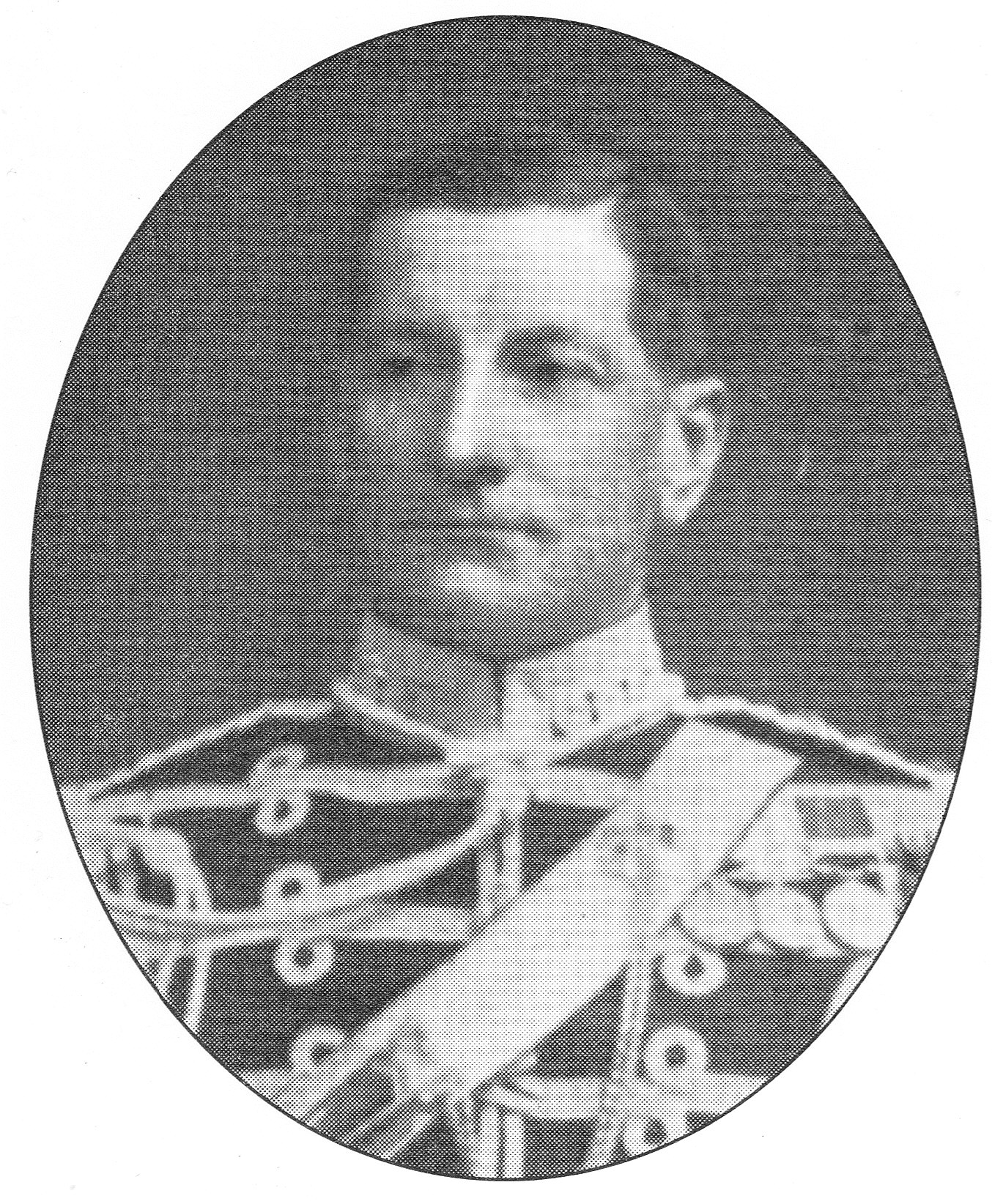
- Wrey in the uniform of the Royal North Devon Hussars

Personal details
- Born: Robert Bourchier Sherard Wrey; 23 May 1855
- Died: 16 January 1917 (aged 61)
- Spouse: Jessie Fraser (m. 1905)
- Relations: David Verney, 21st Baron Willoughby de Broke (grandson)
- Children: Rachel Wrey
- Parent(s): Sir Henry Wrey, 10th Baronet; Marianne Sherard

Military service
- Branch/service: Royal Navy; Royal North Devon Hussars
- Rank: Captain; Lieutenant-colonel
- Battles/wars: Anglo-Egyptian War; Third Anglo-Burmese War

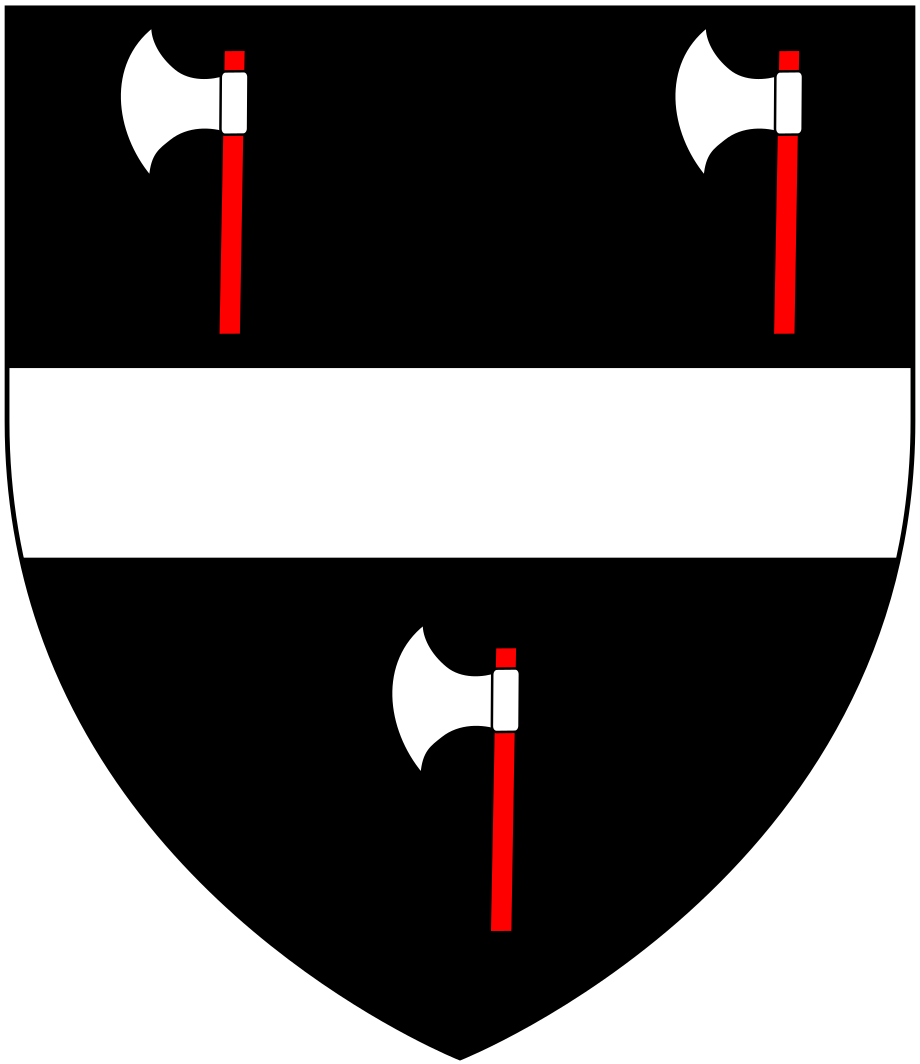
Arms of Wrey of Trebeigh, Cornwall and Tawstock, Devon: Sable, a fesse between three pole-axes argent helved gules

Sir Robert Bourchier Sherard Wrey, 11th Baronet, DL, JP (23 May 1855 – 16 January 1917) of Tawstock Court, North Devon, was a prominent member of the Devonshire gentry.

== Early life ==
He was the son and heir of Sir Henry Bourchier Toke Wrey, 10th Baronet (1829-1900) and the former Marianne Sherard. Among his many siblings were younger brothers Philip Bourchier Sherard Wrey and Reverend Albany Bourchier Sherard Wrey.

His paternal grandparents were the Rev. Sir Henry Bourchier Wrey, 9th Baronet and, his first wife, the former Ellen Maria Toke (a daughter of Nicholas Roundell Toke). His maternal grandparents were Philip Castel Sherard, 9th Baron Sherard and the former Anne Weekes (a daughter of Nathaniel Weekes).

== Career ==
He served in the Royal Navy, seeing action in the 1882 Anglo-Egyptian War and with the Naval Brigade landed in the Third Anglo-Burmese War. He retired from the service with the rank of captain, and later served as honorary lieutenant-colonel of the Royal North Devon Hussars.

In 1900, he succeeded his father in the baronetcy and the family estates. He was the last to live at Tawstock Court and "to keep house in the old manner" and moved to Corffe a nearby house on the estate, having let the Court. In 1913, Sir Robert unsuccessfully laid claim to the barony of FitzWarin, petitioning the Crown that the abeyance should be terminated in his favor and that he should be summoned to the House of Lords as Lord FitzWarin.

== Personal life ==
On 26 October 1905, Sir Robert was married to Jessie Maud Fraser, daughter of William Thomson Fraser and granddaughter of John Fraser, of Mongewell Park, Oxfordshire. He left no sons, only a daughter:

- Rachel Wrey (1911–1991), wife of John Henry Peyto Verney, 20th Baron Willoughby de Broke (1896–1986).

On his death in a nursing home in 1917 without sons, the title passed to his younger brother, Sir Philip Bourchier Sherard Wrey, 12th Baronet, who promptly in 1919 sold 2,500 acres of the estate for £67,000, leaving some 7,000 acres remaining. His widow later married Godfrey Heseltine, second son of John Postle Heseltine.

=== Descendants ===
Through his daughter Rachel, he was a grandfather of David Verney, 21st Baron Willoughby de Broke (b. 1938) and Hon. Susan Geraldine Verney (1942–2009).

Baronetage of England
| Preceded by Henry Wrey | Baronet (of Trebitch); 1900–1917 | Succeeded by Philip Wrey |
