= FitzMartin =

English and Welsh noble family

FitzMartin Martin, Martyn
- Noble family
- Argent two bars gules
- Country: United Kingdom
- Current region: Cornwall; Devon
- Origin: Anglo-Norman England
- Titles: Lord Martin
- Estates: Athelhampton Hall, Dorset; Treverbyn House, Cornwall

FitzMartin or Fitz Martin was the surname of a Norman family based in England and Wales between 1085 and 1342.

== Earliest Generations ==
The earliest well-documented progenitor of this family was Robert Lord of Cemais, whose charter to the monks at Montacute from around 1121 names his parents, Martin and Geva. Geva is known to have been the daughter and heiress of Serlo de Burci, bringing the lands of her father to her marriage, which included Low Ham, Pylle, and Hornblotton. By her second marriage to William de Falaise, which had occurred by 1086, she was to pass to her son and heir, Robert, additional land in Devonshire. From the patronymic of this Robert fitz Martin ("son of Martin") subsequent family members took 'fitz Martin' as a surname, independent of the names of their fathers, until in the mid-13th century, when they began to use simply Martin.

Robert Fitz Martin succeeded to the lands which Serlo de Burci had held in 1086, and also to land held by his stepfather. He was a benefactor to various monasteries, giving land at Compton to Goldcilffe, the church of Blagdon to Stanley in Wiltshire, and the manor of Teignton to Montacute Priory in Somerset. He founded the abbey of St. Dogmael c. 1118. Not later than 1120, Robert Fitz Martin and Maud Peverel, his wife, granted to the abbey of Savigny land at Vengeons (la Manche) which had belonged to William Peverel. In 1134, he joined with other Norman lords in South Wales in resisting the sons of Gruffydd, and witnessed several charters of the Empress Maud, to whom he was adhered. In 1155, Henry II confirmed to him the lands of his grandfather, Serlo de Burci, with all their liberties. Maud predeceased him, and he then married Alice de Nonant, daughter of Roger de Nonant, who survived him and remarried in or before 1175.

== William Fitz Martin (I) ==
William Fitz Martin, Lord of Cemais, son and heir of Robert and Alice, granted a messuage (dwelling house) and land in the manor of Blagdon to the canons of St. Augustine's in Bristol sometime between 1170 and 1183, and also confirmed to the church of St. Michael a grant of land in Uphill. In 1198 he made an exchange of lands in Combe Martin, Devon, with Warin de Morcells, who had married William's sister, Sibyl. William married Angharad, daughter of Rhys ap Gruffydd, Prince of South Wales, who nonetheless expelled William from his castle of Nevern, which Rhys then gave to his own son. William died in either 1208 or 1209, his widow Angharad ferch Rhys surviving him.

== William Fitz Martin (II) ==
William Fitz Martin, Lord of Cemais, son of William and Angharad, in 1209 had letters of protection while staying in Wales. In 1212 he held Blagdon, Dartington, and other manors. He died while still a relatively young man before 15 Feb 1215/6, when the custody of his lands and his heir was granted to Fulk de Breaute. William's wife, Avice de Toriton was likely a sister of Fulk. Avice remarried to Nicholas de Bolewill and was apparently still living in 1246.

== Nicholas Fitz Martin (I) ==
Nicholas Fitz Martin, Lord of Cemais was son of William II and Avice and a minor at the time of his father's death. In 1222, while still underage, the King granted him licence to have a fair at his manor of Combe Martin in Devon, every year until he should come of age, which occurred before September 1231. In 1245 he was ordered to take action against the King's enemies in Gloucestershire, and in 1253 he had orders to attend "diligently" to the King's affairs while he was abroad. In 1257 he had custody of the castles of Cardigan and Kilgarran, but in that year was taken prisoner by the Welsh, and his tenants were used by the King to contribute to his ransom. The following year he was constable of Carmarthen. In 1268, being a justice in Surrey, he was allowed 50 marks out of the fines of that county for his expenses. In 1271, the King's son, Edmund, gave him custody of the castles and counties of Carmarthen and Cardigan, and in 1278 he was one of the justices appointed to hear and determine complaints concerning the Bishop of St. David's in Wales. He died 1282, having married twice: the name of his first wife is not known but he remarried to Isabel in 1259 or 1260.

== Nicholas Fitz Martin (II) ==
Nicholas Fitz Martin, Lord of Cemais was heir to his father's feudal baron of Blagdon, Somerset, but died in his father's lifetime. His widow, Maud, whom he married before 1257, was heiress of the feudal barony of Barnstaple, Devon, as the daughter of Guy de Brian and Eve de Tracy. Maud then married Geoffrey de Camville (died 1308), of Clifton Campville, Staffordshire, who had summons to attend the king at Portsmouth, with horse and arms, to embark in the expedition then proceeding to Gascony. He was subsequently summoned to parliament as Baron Camville, of Clifton, in the county of Stafford, from 23 Jun 1295 to 22 February 1307. Camville survived her by about 29 years during which time he retained possession of the barony under the courtesy of England.

== William, Lord Martin (I) ==
The barony of Barnstaple was recovered on Geoffrey de Camville's death in 1308 by Maud's son William I Fitz Martin, who was aged 25 when he received livery of his inheritance on 1 April 1282. He had married before January 1281/82 to Eleanor Fitz Piers, daughter of Sir Reginald Fitz Piers and Joan de Vivonia. About this time, he was charged to have no dealings with the Welsh rebels, and in this and subsequent years was frequently summoned to service against the Welsh and was ordered to continually dwell in the Welsh Marches. In November 1290, he came to an agreement with William de Valence, Earl of Pembroke, as to the disputed rights in Kemeys. He was summoned to Parliament from 24 June 1295 to 24 September 1324, whereby he is held to have become Lord Martin. He served in Gascony between 1295 and 1297, and in September 1297, while staying at Ghent on the King's service, he made an agreement with John de Hastings, Lord of Abergavenny, by which William, son and heir of said John de Hastings was to marry Eleanor, elder daughter of William Martin, and Edmund, son and heir of William Martin should marry Joan, elder daughter of John de Hastings. This was confirmed by the King 3 November 1297, and on 10 April 1298, he was granted custodies and marriages, in recompense for his losses in a storm at sea while coming with the King from Flanders. In either 1300 or 1301, and later years, he was commissioner of over and terminer in Devon, and in 1304 he was one of a commission to treat with the Scots. In December 1307 he was one of the keepers of the peace in Devon during the King's absence. In September 1308, after the death of Geoffrey, Lord Camville, he succeeded to the inheritance of his mother. In 1309 he joined in the Barons' letter to the Pope and in 1310 he was chosen as one of the fifteen ordainers to draw up ordinances for the reform of the kingdom. He was conservator of the peace for Devon in 1314, and in February 1314 or 1315 he was appointed justice of the West and South Wales and keeper of the castle of Carmarthen and other of the King's castles there. In 1318, he was a member of the standing royal council and in November of that year he was in the King's service in the marches of Scotland. In November 1321, he and Hugh de Courtenay were ordered to attack any who might rise against the King in Cornwall and Devon, and he was also ordered to abstain from the meeting of the "good peers" convened by Thomas, Earl of Lancaster. The following February he was ordered to Coventry to resist the Earl of Lancaster. He died before 8 October 1324, when the writ to the escheator was issued.

== William, Lord Martin (II) ==
William Martin (II), son and heir of William and Eleanor, died without an heir before 4 April 1326, when by modern usage the Barony of Martin is held to have fallen into abeyance between: his surviving sister, Eleanor, wife of Philip de Columbers and widow of William de Hastings (who would herself die without progeny in 1342); and James, Lord Audley, son of his younger sister Joan (died 1322), who had first married Henry de Lacy, and secondly, Nicholas de Audley, 1st Baron Audley of Heleigh Castle, Staffordshire.

== End of the Line ==
The last of the senior line of the family, Eleanor, died in 1342. By this stage, junior branches of the family were already established in Waterston, Dorset (later of Athelhampton); St. David's, Wales; and by 1365 Thomas Martyn had settled in the town of Galway, Ireland. The Martyn family in Devon continued in several branches, at Oxton, Lindridge, Tonacombe, Hempston, Plymouth, etc.

== Family tree ==
FitzMartin tree

Serlo de Burcy
Roger de Nonaunt	Martin	Geva de Burcy	William de Falaise	Shaftsbury nun
Alice de Nonaunt d.1194	Robert fitz Martin d.1159	Maud Peverell fl.1133	Emma de Falaise	William Fitz; Humphrey	The Lord; Rhys
Robert; FitzMartin d.1162?	Sibyl; FitzMartin fl.1198	Warin de Morcells	William; FitzMartin d.1209	Angharad ferch Rhys d.1226
William; FitzMartin d.by 1216	Avice de Breaute fl.1246
? d.bef.d.1260	Nicholas; FitzMartin d.1282	Isabel; FitzWilliam	Robert; FitzMartin fl.1235
issue
Maud de Brian	Nicholas; FitzMartin d.1260	Robert; FitzMartin fl.1303	Warin; FitzMartin d.1328	Avice; FitzMartin	David; FitzMartin; Bishop d.1327	John; FitzMartin	William; FitzMartin fl. 1326
issue	issue
William; Lord Martin d.by 1324	Eleanor; Fitz Piers	Mary; Martin	Richard le Fleming
William; Hastings	Eleanor; Martin d.1342	Philip de Columbers	Henry de Lacy; Earl of Lincoln	Joan; Martin d.1322	Nicholas de Audley
no issue
Edmund; Martin fl.1297	Joan; Hastings	William; Lord Martin d.1326	Margaret; Hastings
no issue	no issue	James; Lord Audley (1313-86)

== See also ==
- John de Courcy

== Sources ==
- The Baronial Martins*, Lionel Nex, 1987.
- The Lords of Cemais, Dilwynn Miles, Haverfordwest, 1996.
- The Tribes of Galway, Adrian J. Martyn, Galway, 2001.
- Complete Peerage, Vol VIII, pp. 530–537
- Ancestral Roots of Certain Colonists, lines 63A, 71, 122.
- Maison Blois-Champagne
