= Sir Henry Wrey, 10th Baronet =

Major Sir Henry Wrey, Bt DL JP

High Sheriff of Devon
- In office 1891–1892
- Preceded by: Charles Robert Collins
- Succeeded by: Sampson Hanbury

Personal details
- Born: Henry Bourchier Toke Wrey; 27 June 1829 Devon, England
- Died: 10 March 1900 (aged 70) Ventnor, Isle of Wight
- Spouse: Marianne Sherard (m. 1854)
- Children: 14
- Education: Trinity College, Oxford

Sir Henry Bourchier Toke Wrey, 10th Baronet DL JP (27 June 1829 – 10 March 1900) of Tawstock Court, North Devon.

== Early life ==
He was the eldest son of the Rev. Sir Henry Bourchier Wrey, 9th Baronet, the Rector at Tawstock, and, his first wife, the former Ellen Maria Toke, who were first cousins. He had two siblings, the Rev. Bourchier William Toke Wrey (the Curate at Warmsworth who married Anne Caroline Crosthwait, daughter of Thomas Crosthwait) and Anna Maria Toke Wrey (who married Very Rev. Isaac Morgan Reeves, Dean of Ross, Ireland). After his mother's death in 1864, his father remarried to Jane Lamb (a daughter of Humble Lamb), in 1865.

His paternal grandparents were Sir Bourchier Wrey, 7th Baronet and the former Anne Osborne (a daughter of John Osborne). His maternal grandparents were Nicholas Roundell Toke and Anna Maria Wrey (a daughter of Sir Bourchier Wrey, 6th Baronet).

Wrey matriculated at Trinity College, Oxford in November 1846 and graduated in 1851.

== Career ==
Wrey captain in the 4th (Militia) Battalion Devonshire Regiment, later gaining the rank of Major. He succeeded as the 10th Baronet Wrey, of Trebitch, on 23 December 1882. In 1885, he sold the former Bourchier manor of Holne on the River Dart to Hon. Richard Maitland Westenra Dawson (third son of Richard Dawson, 1st Earl of Dartrey). In the same year of 1885 he made substantial improvements to Tawstock Court, most notably to the two long wings extending westwards, forming a long narrow courtyard, which received terracotta mullioned windows and dressings, probably made at Lauder & Smith's Barnstaple pottery. He also added a western gatehouse to close off this western courtyard, with terracotta datestone "1885" above the arched gateway.

Sir Henry held the office of Deputy Lieutenant, Justice of the Peace, and served as High Sheriff of Devon in 1891.

== Personal life ==
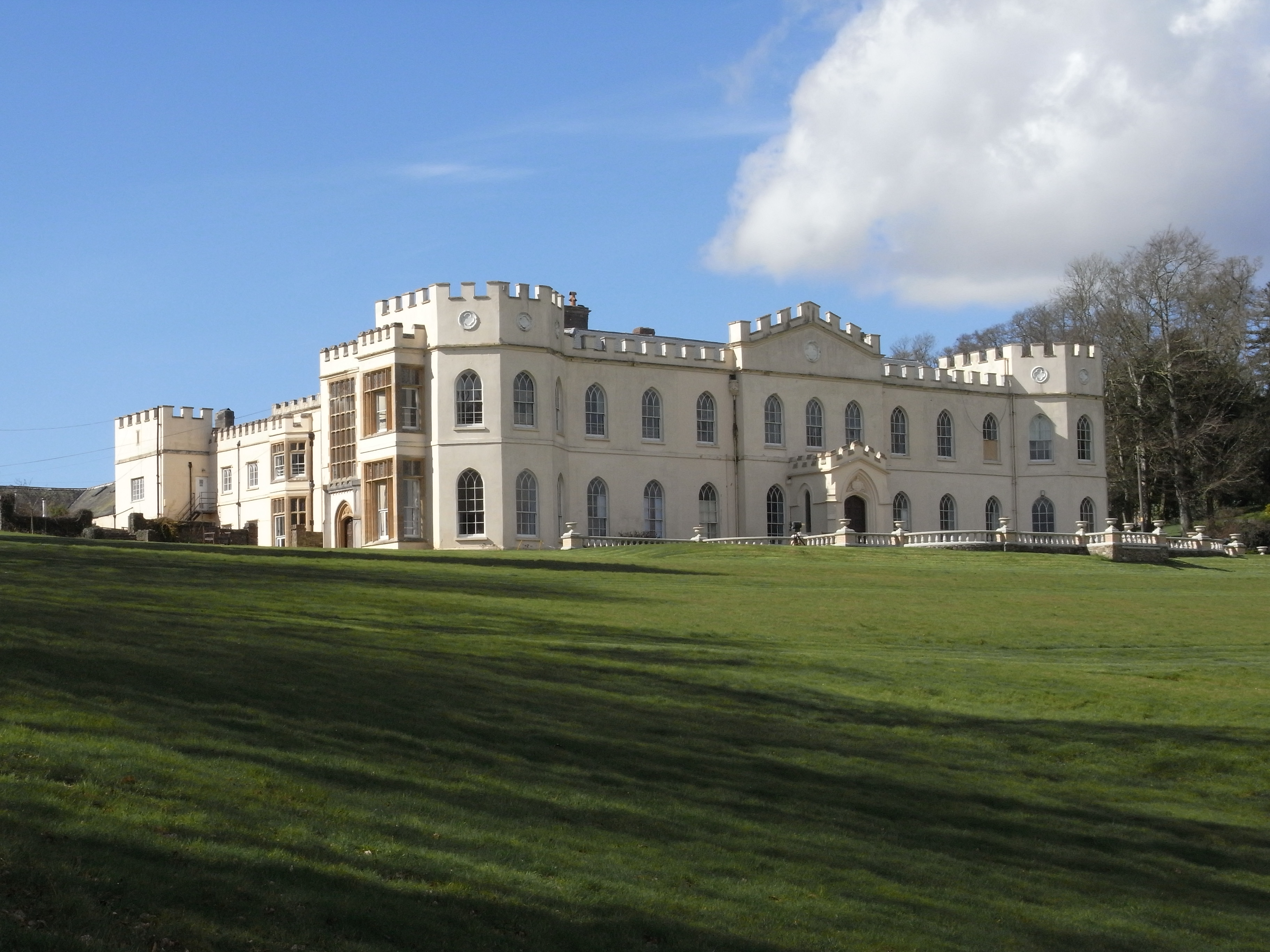
Tawstock Court

On 6 September 1854, Wrey was married to the Hon. Marianne Sarah Sherard at Sidmouth in Devon. Marianne was the only child of Philip Sherard, 9th Baron Sherard and the former Anne Weekes (a daughter of Nathaniel Weekes). Together, they were the parents of:

- Sir Robert Wrey, 11th Baronet (1855–1917), who married to Jessie Maud Fraser, daughter of William Thomson Fraser, in 1905. In 1913, Robert unsuccessfully laid claim to the barony of FitzWarin, petitioning the Crown that the abeyance should be terminated in his favor.
- Annie Marian Wrey (c. 1857–1926), who died unmarried.
- Emma Henrietta Wrey (c. 1858–1932), who died unmarried.
- Sir Philip Bourchier Sherard Wrey, 12th Baronet (1858–1936), who married Alice Mary Louisa Borton, a daughter of Captain Henry Borton.
- Augusta Eleanora Wrey (c. 1860–1951), who died unmarried.
- Reverend Sir Albany Bourchier Sherard Wrey, 13th Baronet (1861–1948), who married Isabel Frances Sophia Fleet, a daughter of Thomas Horn Fleet.
- Florence Amelia Wrey (c. 1862–1932), who died unmarried.
- Beatrice Alexandra Wrey (c. 1863–1961), who died unmarried.
- Captain William Bourchier Sherard Wrey (1865–1926), who married Flora Bathurst Greive, daughter of Vice-Admiral William Samuel Greive. Her sister Blanche married Lord Francis Osborne, a younger son George Osborne, 9th Duke of Leeds.
- Isabel Maria Wrey (c. 1866–1958), who died unmarried.
- Gerald Bourchier Sherard Wrey (1870–1902), who married Jane Ellen Handford, a daughter of William Handford.
- Arthur Henry Wrey (1872–1940), who married Florence Radmall, a daughter of Thomas Radmall.
- Edward Castell Wrey (1875–1933), who married Katherine Joan Dene, daughter of Rev. John Dene. Their son was Sir Castel Richard Bourchier Wrey, 14th Baronet.
- Reginald Charles Wrey (1876–1931), who married Evelyn Kenrick, a daughter of Rev. Charles William Herbert Kenrick.

Sir Henry died on 10 March 1900 in the seaside resort town of Ventnor, Isle of Wight. He was succeeded by his eldest son Robert, upon whose death in 1917 the baronetcy passed to Robert's younger brother, Philip, who in 1919 sold 2,500 acres of the family estate for £67,000, leaving some 7,000 acres remaining.

Baronetage of England
Preceded by Henry Wrey	Baronet (of Trebitch); 1882–1900	Succeeded by Robert Wrey
