= Thomas Marrow =

Thomas Marrow (died 1561) was an English lawyer, landowner, and Member of Parliament for Warwickshire in 1554.

== Career ==
He was a son of Thomas Marrow (died 1538) of Wolston, Warwickshire, and Rudfyn at Kenilworth, and was said to be a descendant of two mayors of London John Shadworth and William Marrow. Like his father, he was trained and practiced as a lawyer in London. Marrow bought up lands in Warwickshire around Berkswell; Mary I of England granted Marrow the Barony of Barnstaple and the Manor of Birmingham in 1555 or 1557.

A stained glass window at Knowle Parish Church commemorated his grandfather Thomas Marrow, and other windows had the arms of local landowners including Thomas Dabridgecourt and Edward Ferrers.

== Marriage and children ==
Thomas Marrow married Alice Young. Their ten children included:

- Samuel Marrow (died 1610), who married Margaret Lyttleton, a daughter of Sir John Lyttelton (1519–1590). Their daughter Bridget Marrow was a keeper of the jewels of Anne of Denmark.
- Thomas Marrow
