= Maps of castles in England by county =

Location maps of castles in England

The castles displayed on each map are those listed in the List of castles in England for the corresponding county. Click on the red or green dot to display a detailed map showing the location of the castle. Green dots represent for the most part castles of which substantial remains survive, red dots represent castles of which only earthworks or vestiges survive, or in a few cases castles of which there are no visible remains.

== Bedfordshire ==
Castles in Bedfordshire

== Berkshire ==
Castles in Berkshire

== Bristol ==
Castles in Bristol

== Buckinghamshire ==
Castles in Buckinghamshire

== Cambridgeshire ==
Castles in Cambridgeshire

== Cornwall ==
Castles in Cornwall

== Cumbria ==
Castles in Cumbria

== Derbyshire ==
Castles in Derbyshire

== Devon ==
Castles in Devon

== Dorset ==
Castles in Dorset

== Co. Durham ==
Castles in Durham

== East Riding of Yorkshire ==
Castles in East Riding of Yorkshire

== East Sussex ==
Castles in East Sussex

== Essex ==
Castles in Essex

== Greater London ==
Castles in Greater London

== Greater Manchester ==
Castles in Greater Manchester

== Hampshire ==
Castles in Hampshire

== Herefordshire ==
Castles in Herefordshire

== Hertfordshire ==
Castles in Hertfordshire

== Isle of Wight ==
Castles in Isle of Wight

== Isles of Scilly ==
Castles in Isles of Scilly

== Kent ==
Castles in Kent

== Lancashire ==
Castles in Lancashire
Castles in City of Lancaster

== Leicestershire ==
Castles in Leicestershire

== Lincolnshire ==
Castles in Lincolnshire

== Merseyside ==
Castles in Merseyside

== Norfolk ==
Castles in Norfolk

== Northamptonshire ==
Castles in Northamptonshire

== Northumberland ==
Castles in Northumberland

== North Yorkshire ==
Castles in North Yorkshire

== Nottinghamshire ==
Castles in Nottinghamshire

== Oxfordshire ==
Castles in Oxfordshire

== Rutland ==
Castles in Rutland

== Shropshire ==
Castles in Shropshire

== Somerset ==
Castles in Somerset

== South Yorkshire ==
Castles in South Yorkshire

== Staffordshire ==
Castles in Staffordshire

== Suffolk ==
Castles in Suffolk

== Surrey ==
Castles in Surrey

== Tyne and Wear ==
Castles in Tyne and Wear

== Warwickshire ==
Castles in Warwickshire

== West Midlands ==
Castles in the West Midlands

== West Sussex ==
Castles in West Sussex

== West Yorkshire ==
Castles in West Yorkshire

== Wiltshire ==
Castles in Wiltshire

== Worcestershire ==
Castles in Worcestershire

== See also ==
- Castles in England
- List of castles
