= Barnstaple Castle =

Castle in Devon, England

Coordinates: 51.08083°N 4.06289°W

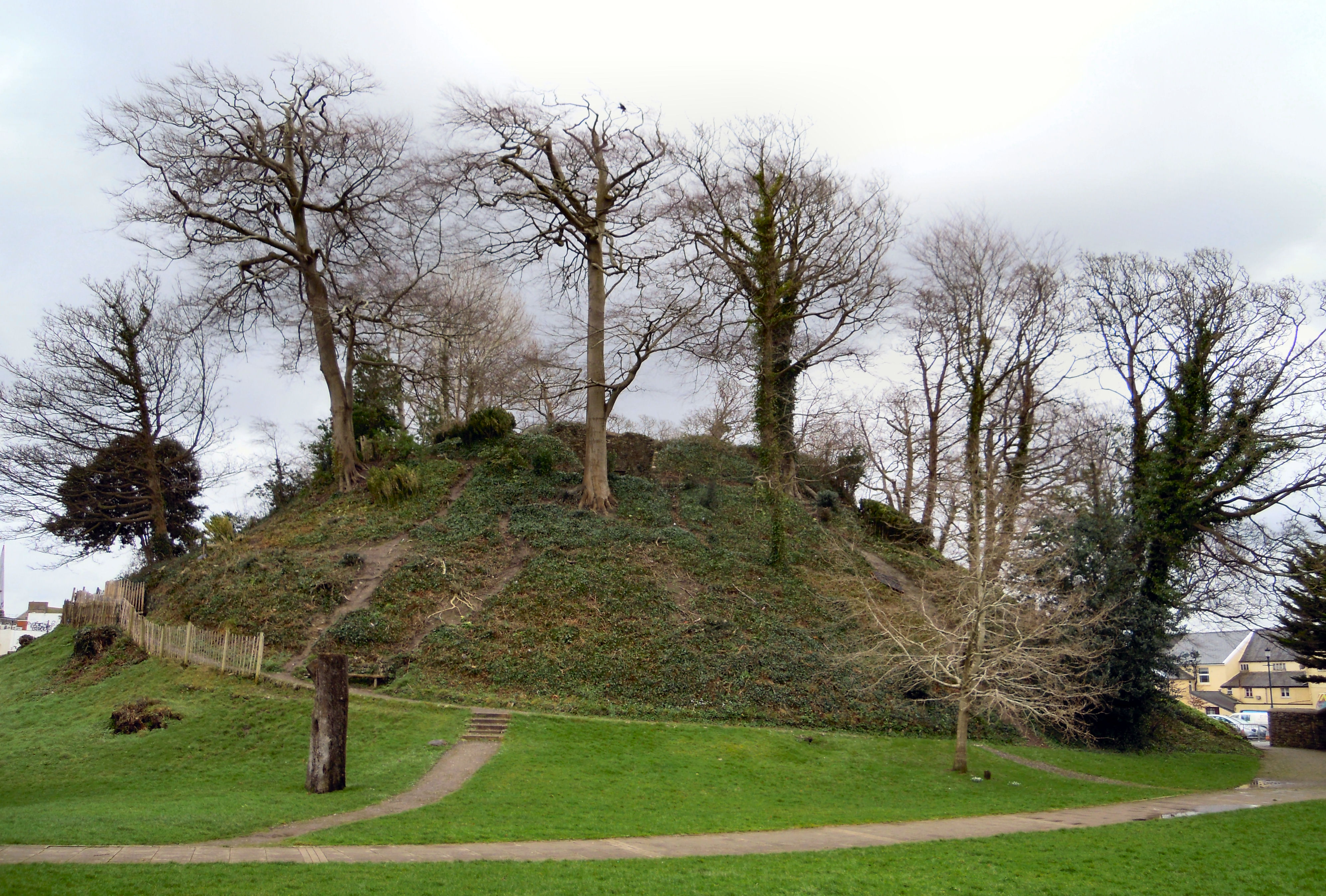
Barnstaple Castle's motte in 2018

Barnstaple Castle stood near what is now the centre of the town of Barnstaple, Devon (grid reference SS557332). When it was built, it was on the western side of the fortified town and commanded a good view of both the town and its important river crossings. The castle was built on top of an early medieval cemetery.

== History ==
Barnstaple Castle was founded in the 11th or 12th century; it was first mentioned in a 12th-century document. It is uncertain who founded the castle: if it was early it could have been built on the instruction of William the Conqueror as he subdued south-west England or if it was a later construction it could have been built for Juhel (Joel) of Totnes, who held the castle in the early 12th century. Juhel also established Barnstaple Priory around 1107.

King Stephen granted the castle to Henry de Tracy, one of his supporters. In the 12th century, stone buildings were erected on top of the motte, possibly during Henry de Tracy's tenure. The castle descended through his family to another Henry de Tracy, who held the castle in 1228 when Henry III ordered the Sheriff of Devon to make sure that the walls of the castle did not exceed 10 feet (3.0 m) in height as recorded in the Close Rolls for that year.

By the time of the death of the last Henry de Tracey in 1274, the castle was beginning to decay. According to an inquisition from 1281, building materials had been removed from the castle without permission and by 1326 the castle was a ruin. According to John Leland's Itinerary, published in 1542, "There be manifest ruines of a great castelle at the north west side of the towne a litle beneth the toun bridge, and a peace of the dungeon yet standith." Adam Wyat recorded that part of the castle walls blew down in a storm in 1601.

=== Later history and investigations ===
The castle site was excavated in 1927 and 1975. The 1975 excavation revealed the presence of one hundred and five graves at the location. The excavation report, published in 1986, shows that the artefacts recovered at the location showed that the graves were most probably of Christians. Now only the tree covered motte remains.

Since 1950, the castle has been designated a scheduled monument, which is intended to protect important archaeological sites. The site is referred to simply as "Castle Mound" locally.

== See also ==
- Scheduled monuments in Devon
- List of castles in Devon
- Map of castles in Devon
- Reginald de Braose
