= John Tuchet, 4th Baron Audley =

English peer

The Right Honourable; The Baron Audley
- Baron Audley
- Arms of Tuchet: Ermine, a chevron gules
- Tenure: 1408 – 1408
- Predecessor: Nicholas Audley (abeyant since 1391)
- Successor: James Tuchet
- Other titles: Baron Tuchet
- Born: John Tuchet; 23 April 1371
- Died: 19 December 1408 (aged 37)
- Spouse(s): Elizabeth Stafford
- Issue: James; Margaret; Elizabeth

John Tuchet, 4th Baron Audley, 1st Baron Tuchet (23 April 1371 – 19 December 1408) was an English peer.

John Tuchet, 4th Baron Audley was the son of Sir John Tuchet, called "Baron Audley", and his wife Maud, widow of Sir Richard de Willoughby. His paternal grandparents were Sir John Tuchet (1327—1371) and his wife Joan Audley (1331–1393, daughter of James Audley, 2nd Baron Audley and first wife Lady Joan Mortimer).

In 1391, when his childless great-uncle Nicholas Audley, 3rd Baron Audley died, the Audley Barony was abeyant. Meanwhile, he was created 1st Baron Tuchet in 1403 and received one-third of the share of the barony of Audley.

In 1408 the Barony was revived, and John Tuchet became 4th Baron Audley.

Before 1398, he married Elizabeth Stafford, daughter of Sir Humphrey Stafford and his first wife, Alice Grenville. They had one son, James, and two daughters, Margaret and Elizabeth. John was succeeded by his only son, James Tuchet.

Peerage of England
New creation	Baron Tuchet; 1403–1408	Succeeded by James Tuchet
Preceded by Nicholas Audley (abeyant in 1391)	Baron Audley; 1408	Succeeded by James Tuchet
