= Nicholas Audley, 3rd Baron Audley =

English nobleman

The Right Honouable; The Baron Audley
- Baron Audley
- Arms of Audley: Gules a fret or.
- Tenure: 1386 – 1391
- Predecessor: James Audley
- Successor: In abeyance, title next held by John Tuchet
- Born: Nicholas Audley c. 1328; Staffordshire, England
- Died: 1391 (aged 62–63)
- Spouse(s): Elizabeth Beaumont
- Parents: James Audley; Joan Mortimer

Nicholas Audley, 3rd Baron Audley (c. 1328 – 1391) was born at Heighley Castle, Staffordshire, England to James Audley, 2nd Baron Audley, and was his only surviving son.

He was known as Lord of Rougemont (Redcastle, Shropshire) and was Marcher Lord of Kemes (as was his father), He was based at Heighley.

Nicholas's father-in-law Henry, 4th Earl of Buchan, received, amongst other large grants of manors and lands, a grant of the Lordship of the Isle of Man in 1310.

Later members of the Audley-Stanley family would become Kings of Mann.

== Family ==
Nicholas married Elizabeth Beaumont, sister of John de Beaumont, 2nd Lord Beaumont, and daughter of Henry de Beaumont, 4th Earl of Buchan. He died without issue and the Barony was abeyant at his demise in 1391. It was revived however in 1408 for John Tuchet, grandson of Nicholas' sister Joan and her husband Sir John Tuchet (1327—1371). Although he had many disagreements with his father, he was nevertheless buried alongside his father's marble tomb in the quire of Hulton Abbey.

== See also ==
- Audley-Stanley family
- Baron Audley
- Abbey Hulton
- Hawkstone Park history
- Weston-under-Redcastle

Peerage of England
Preceded by James Audley	Baron Audley; 1386—1391	In abeyance Title next held by John Tuchet
