= James Audley, 2nd Baron Audley =

English peer (1312/13–1386)

The Right Honourable; The Baron Audley
- Baron Audley
- Arms of Audley: Gules a fret or.
- Predecessor: Nicholas Audley
- Successor: Nicholas Audley
- Born: James Audley; 8 January 1312; Staffordshire, England
- Died: 1 April 1386 (aged 74); England
- Spouses: Joan Mortimer; Isabel LeStrange
- Issue: at least 8, including Nicholas and Margaret

James Audley, 2nd Baron Audley (8 January 1312/13 – 1 April 1386) of Heighley Castle, Staffordshire, was an English peer. He was the son and heir of Nicholas Audley, 1st Baron Audley (1289–1316) by his wife Joan Martin (died Feb. 1320 / 1 Aug. 1322), who was the daughter of William Martin (died 1324), feudal baron of Barnstaple (in Devon), and Marcher Lord of Kemes (in what later became Pembrokeshire). She was posthumously the eventual sole heiress of her brother William FitzMartin (died 1326) to Barnstaple and Kemes.

== Marriages and children ==
James Audley married twice. His first marriage, before 13 June 1330, was to Joan Mortimer, daughter of Roger Mortimer, 1st Earl of March by his wife Joan de Geneville, 2nd Baroness Geneville. By Joan he had four children:

- Their eldest son, Nicholas, succeeded his father in the title, becoming Nicholas Audley, 3rd Baron Audley (c.1328–1391) – he married Elizabeth Beaumont, a daughter of Henry de Beaumont, 4th Earl of Buchan, but died without legitimate issue whereupon his title became abeyant
- Their second son Roger predeceased his father.
- Joan (1331–1393), their first daughter, married Sir John Tuchet (1327–1371). Upon Nicholas' death, she became co-heiress to his lands and title. In 1403, her grandson, John (Nicholas's great-nephew) was acknowledged as having a 1/3 share in the lands of the barony. In 1408, the abeyance of title was terminated in John's favour, and he thus succeeded to Nicholas' titles
- Margaret (born pre-1351, died 1410/11), their second daughter, who married Sir Roger Hillary.

After the death of his first wife, Audley married before December 1351 to Isabel LeStrange, daughter of Roger le Strange, 5th Baron Strange (c. 1327–1382) of Knokyn. They had four children: three sons, Thomas, Roland (or Rowland) and James, who all died childless, and a daughter, Margaret Audley (died 1373), who married Fulk FitzWarin, 4th Baron FitzWarin (1341–1374) of Whittington Castle, Shropshire and Alveston, Gloucestershire. Fulk's mother was said to be Joan de Beaumont, a daughter of Henry de Beaumont, 4th Earl of Buchan, and was thus a sister of the wife of Fulk's half-brother-in-law Nicholas Audley, 3rd Baron Audley. In 1392 Margaret's 3-year-old grandson Fulk FitzWarin, 6th Baron FitzWarin (1389–1407) inherited the manor of Tawstock in Devon, thought to have been a later seat of the feudal barons of Barnstaple, which had been settled in 1370 by James Audley, 2nd Baron, in tail male successively to his three childless sons from his second marriage.

== Succession ==
James Audley had settled the feudal barony of Barnstaple by means of an entail on his heirs male, with remainder to the crown. As all his sons from both his marriages died without male issue, the barony became the inheritance of King Richard II, who granted the barony to his half-brother John Holland, 1st Duke of Exeter, in tail-male.

Peerage of England
Preceded by Nicholas Audley	Baron Audley; 1316—1386	Succeeded by Nicholas Audley
