= Audley End (disambiguation) =

Audley End is the abbreviated name for Audley End House, an early 17th-century country house just outside Saffron Walden, Essex, England.

Audley End may also refer to:

- Audley End Airfield, a small grass runway in Essex, England
- Audley End Railway, a miniature railway in Essex, England
- Audley End railway station, a railway station serving the small village of Wendens Ambo and the nearby town of Saffron Walden, Essex, England
- Audley End, Suffolk - a hamlet in the parish of Lawshall, Suffolk, England

== See also ==
- Audley (disambiguation)
