= Yokochō =

Type of street in Tokyo, Japan

Sakaemachi Street (Sakaechō-dōri), a yokochō in Ikebukuro, Tokyo

A yokochō (Japanese: 横丁) is a type of side street, or alleyway, in Japan which usually contains establishments such as izakayas, snack bars and restaurants. They are common in Tokyo, Osaka, Kyoto and Hiroshima. Many developed around railway stations, post-war market areas (including black markets) or entertainment districts. Sakaemachi Street (Sakaechō-dōri) and Mikuni Alley (Mikuni-koji) in Ikebukuro, Tokyo, and Omoide Yokochō (Memory Lane) in West Shinjuku are examples of these. Toshima Ward, in which the streets are located, has identified them as being historic and that their streetscapes should be preserved. Other examples include Ameya-Yokochō, also in Tokyo, and Kashiya Yokocho in Kawagoe City, Saitama.

Jaroslav Burian described yokochōs as an "urban micro-spatiality" in his Advances in Spatial Planning case study (2012).

== Typical dimensions ==
Sakaemachi Street in Ikebukuro, Tokyo, is around 165 feet (50 m) long and 8 feet (2.4 m) wide. In 2012, the street had fourteen shops.

The adjacent Mikuni Alley is around 200 feet (61 m) long and also 8 feet (2.4 m) wide (9 feet (2.7 m) in parts). In 2012, it had twenty shops.
