= Audley (surname) =

Audley is a surname of Old English origin derived from the village of Audley, Staffordshire. Notable people with the surname include:

- Anselm Audley (born 1982), British fantasy writer
- Eleanor Audley (1905–1991), American actress
- Gordon Audley (1928-2012), Canadian speed skater ;
- Henry de Audley (1175–1246), English baron
- Hugh Audley (1577–1662), English moneylender and lawyer in the 17th century
- Hugh de Audley, 1st Earl of Gloucester (1291–1347), English lord
- James Audley (disambiguation), several people
- John Audley (disambiguation), several people
- Margaret Audley (disambiguation), several people
- Margaret de Audley, 2nd Baroness Audley (1318–c.1350), English noblewoman
- Maxine Audley (1923–1992), English actress
- Michael Audley (1913–1995), American film director
- Thomas Audley, 1st Baron Audley of Walden (1488–1544), Lord Chancellor under Henry VIII
- Tom Audley (born 1986), English rugby player

Fictional characters:

- Charles Audley, protagonist of the Georgette Heyer historical romance novel about the Battle of Waterloo, An Infamous Army
- David Audley, protagonist in the series of eponymous British espionage thrillers by Anthony Price
- Julian Audley, Earl of Worth, protagonist of the Georgette Heyer historical romance novel, Regency Buck
- Lucy Audley, protagonist of the Mary Elizabeth Braddon's sensational novel Lady Audley's Secret

== See also ==
- Baron Audley, a title in the English peerage
- Audley Harrison, British professional boxer.
