= Audley =

Audley may refer to:

== People ==
- Audley (surname)
- Audley Harrison, British boxer

== Places ==
- Audley End House, a country house just outside Saffron Walden, Essex, England
- Audley House, London, a block of flats in central London, England
- Audley, Ontario, a former unincorporated community in Canada, now part of town of Ajax
- Audley, Staffordshire, a village in England
- Audley, New South Wales, a suburb of Sydney, Australia

== Other uses ==
- Baron Audley, a title in the Peerage of England
- Audley Travel, a tour operator with offices in the UK, USA and Canada.
- Audley Group, a market leader in the UK in building and managing luxury retirement villages
