= Kashiya Yokocho =

Street in Kawagoe, Saitama Prefecture, Japan

Kashiya Yokocho 菓子屋横丁
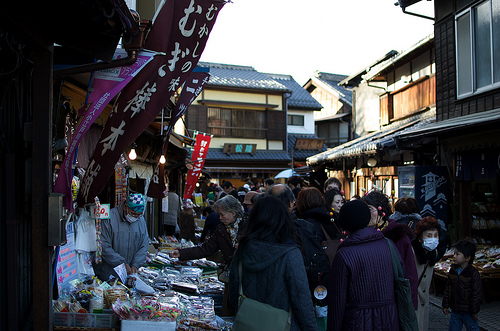
- Interactive map of Kashiya Yokocho 菓子屋横丁
- Location: Kawagoe, Saitama
- Coordinates: 35°55′28.6″N 139°28′51.8″E

Kashiya Yokocho (Penny Candy Lane) is a shopping street in Kawagoe City, Saitama Prefecture. Confectionery stores including penny candy stores line both sides of the street.

== Origins and history ==
The origin of the street dates back to 1796 (8th year of the Kansei Era), when Tozaemon Suzuki started to produce simple candies of Tokyoite choice in the present location, which flourished as the temple town of Yojuin temple. Later, the number of stores increased by sharing goodwill. After the Great Kanto Earthquake, this street manufactured and shipped Edo style candies such as Chitose Ame (red and white long stick candy), Kintarō-ame (long stick candy with Kintaro’s face), Mizu Yokan (soft adzuki-bean jelly) and Karinto (fried dough cookies) instead of devastated Tokyo. In the early Showa Era, there used to be more than 70 stores. At present, some 20 stores keep making candies according to the traditional manufacturing method. The street is stone-paved, whose quiet old atmosphere attracts tourists with its nostalgic feel. Kashiya Yokocho was chosen as one of the ‘100 Scent Sceneries’ by the Ministry of the Environment.

In June 2015, five stores burned down in a fire triggered by one of the candy stores there.

== See also ==
- Yokochō
