= Sakaemachi Street =

Historic street in Ikebukuro, Toshima City, Japan

Coordinates: 35.7292°N 139.7152°E

- Looking north along Sakaemachi Street
- Interactive map of Sakaemachi Street
- Length: 0.03 mi (0.048 km)
- Location: Ikebukuro, Toshima City, Japan
- North end: Animate Street
- South end: Unnamed street

Sakaemachi Street (or Sakaechō-dōri; Japanese: 栄町通り) is a historic side street (yokochō; 横丁) in Ikebukuro, Tokyo, Japan. It is near Mikuni Alley (Mikuni-koji; 美久仁小路), which has the same status. Sakaemachi Street runs between Animate Street in the north and an unnamed one-way street in the south. It is around 165 feet (50 m) long, including the short section leading west from Animate Street, before a 90-degree turn to the south, containing izakayas, snack bars and restaurants. It is 8 feet (2.4 m) wide. In a 2012 study, the street had fourteen shops. The businesses on the western side of the alley can also be accessed from Animate Street.

== History ==
Looking south

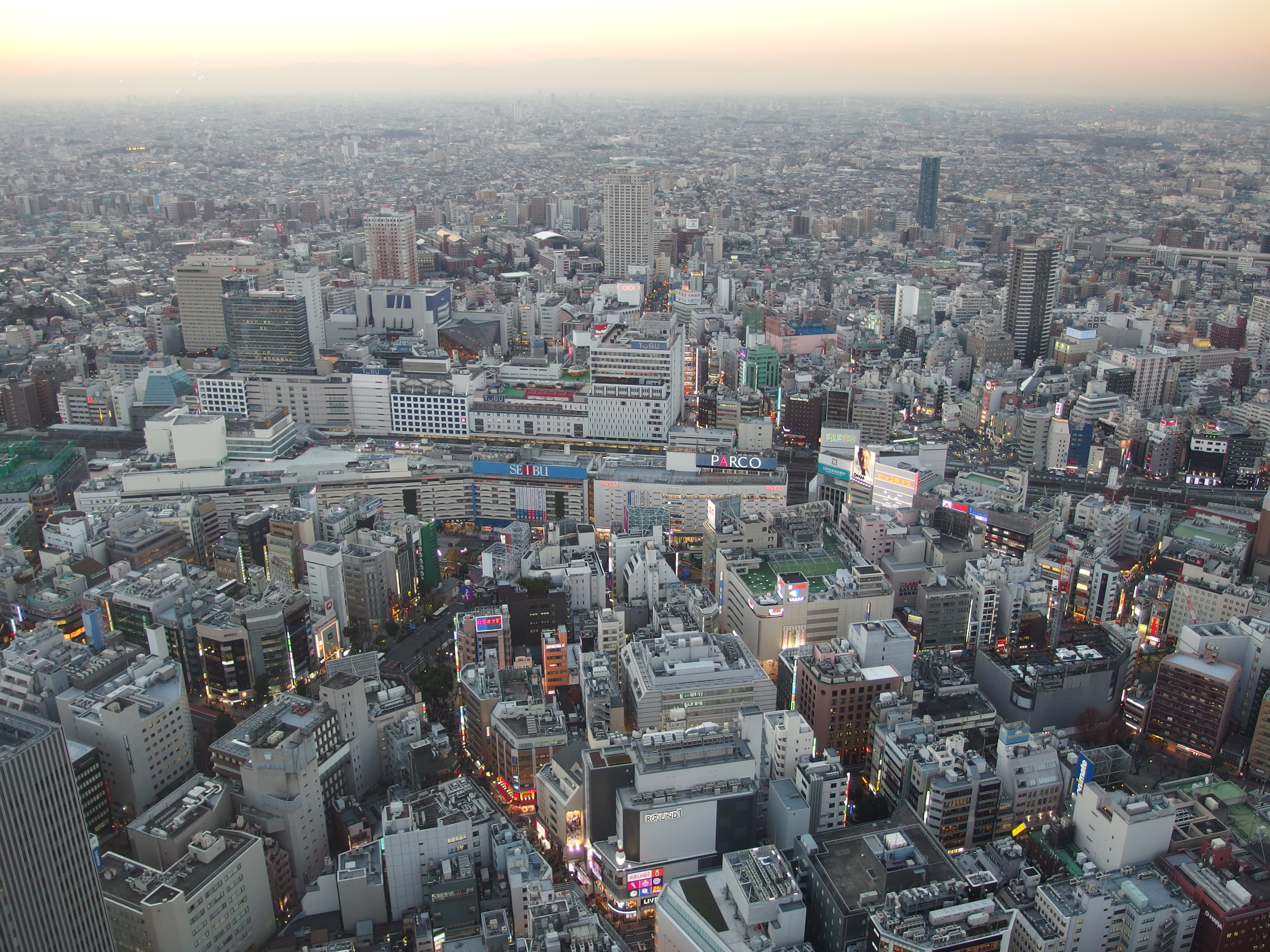
Sakaemachi Street and Mikuni Alley are in the neighbourhood in the lower left of this photo taken from the Sunshine 60 Observatory

Ikebukuro was heavily damaged during World War II, with much of the land on the eastern side of Ikebukuro Station left in a burned state. After the war, black markets began to appear around the station, providing food and other essentials. It is estimated that Tokyo contained around 60,000 black-market stalls in the years following the war.

During a land readjustment in 1950–51, the local authority cleared the black markets, but the vendors moved slightly further out and established new markets. One of those new markets evolved into today's Sakaemachi Street (Sakaechō-dōri; 栄町通り), with new vendors filling the former stalls with bars for food and drinks.

Planning documents in Toshima Ward identify Sakaemachi Street and Mikuni Alley (Mikuni-koji; 美久仁小路) as historic side streets (yokochō; 横丁) and that their streetscapes should be preserved.
