= Mikuni Alley =

Historic street in Ikebukuro, Toshima City, Japan

Coordinates: 35.7290°N 139.7157°E

- The western half of Mikuni Alley; it changes course, briefly, diagonally to the left at the cream-coloured building
- Interactive map of Mikuni Alley
- Length: 0.037 mi (0.060 km)
- Location: Ikebukuro, Toshima City, Japan
- East end: Unnamed street
- West end: Animate Street

The Animate Street entrance to the Mikuni Alley

Mikuni Alley (or Mikuni-koji; Japanese: 美久仁小路) is a historic side street (yokochō; 横丁) in Ikebukuro, Tokyo, Japan. It is near Sakaemachi Street (Sakaechō-dōri; 栄町通り), which has the same status. Mikuni Alley runs between Animate Street in the west and an unnamed one-way street in the east. It is around 200 feet (61 m) long, with a slight course change in its midsection, containing izakayas, snack bars and restaurants. It is 8 feet (2.4 m) wide (9 feet (2.7 m) in parts). In a 2012 study, the street had twenty shops.

== History ==
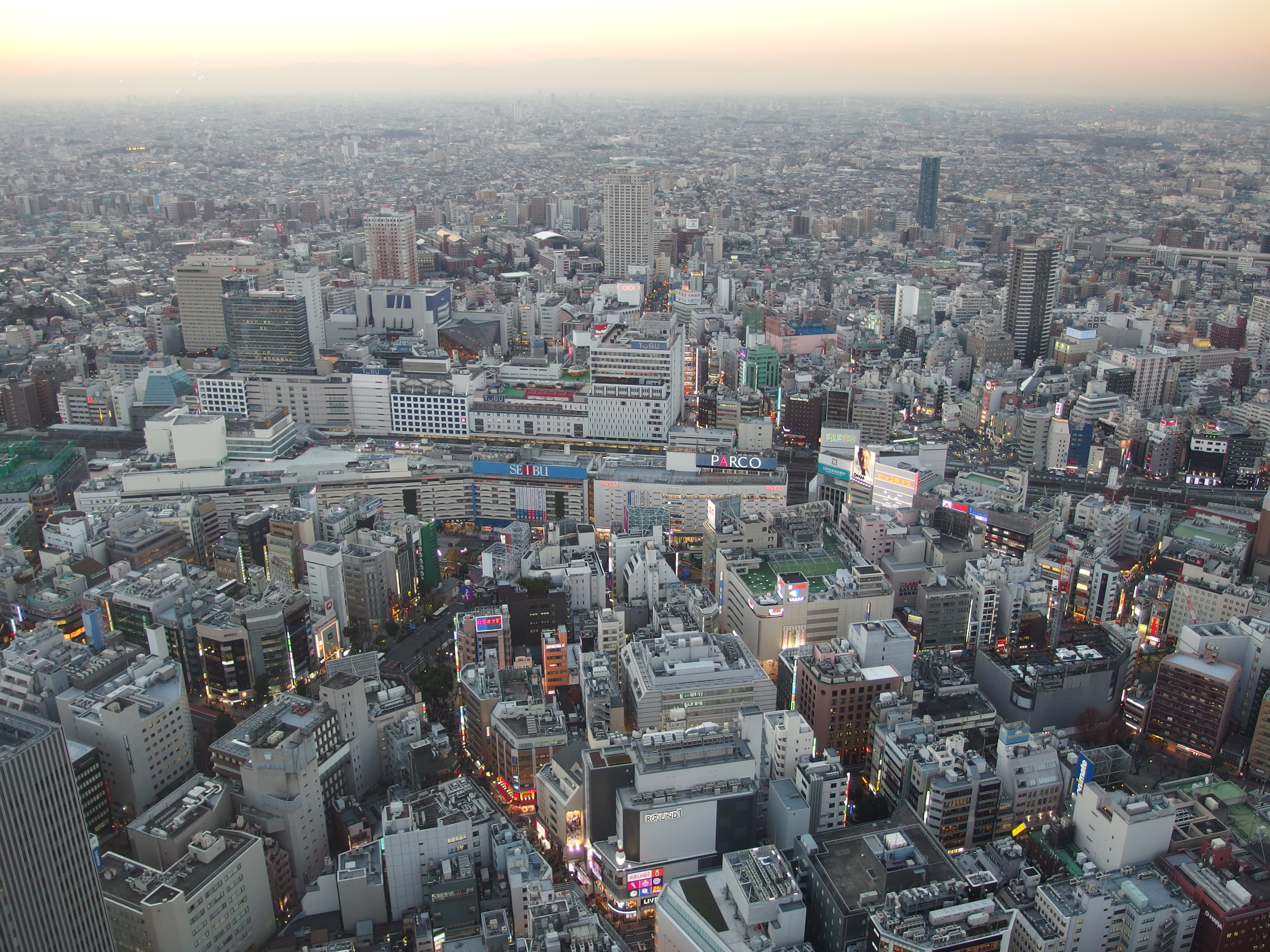
Mikuni Alley and Sakaemachi Street are in the neighbourhood in the lower left of this photo taken from the Sunshine 60 Observatory

Ikebukuro was heavily damaged during World War II, with much of the land on the eastern side of Ikebukuro Station left in a burned state. After the war, black markets began to appear around the station, providing food and other essentials. It is estimated that Tokyo contained around 60,000 black-market stalls in the years following the war.

During a land readjustment in 1950–51, the local authority cleared the black markets, but the vendors moved slightly further out and established new markets. One of those new markets evolved into today's Mikuni Alley (Mikuni-koji; 美久仁小路), with new vendors filling the former stalls with bars for food and drinks.

Planning documents in Toshima Ward identify Sakaemachi Street (Sakaechō-dōri; 栄町通り) and Mikuni Alley as historic side streets (yokochō; 横丁) and that their streetscapes should be preserved.
