= Ameya-Yokochō =

Open-air market in the Taito Ward of Tokyo, Japan

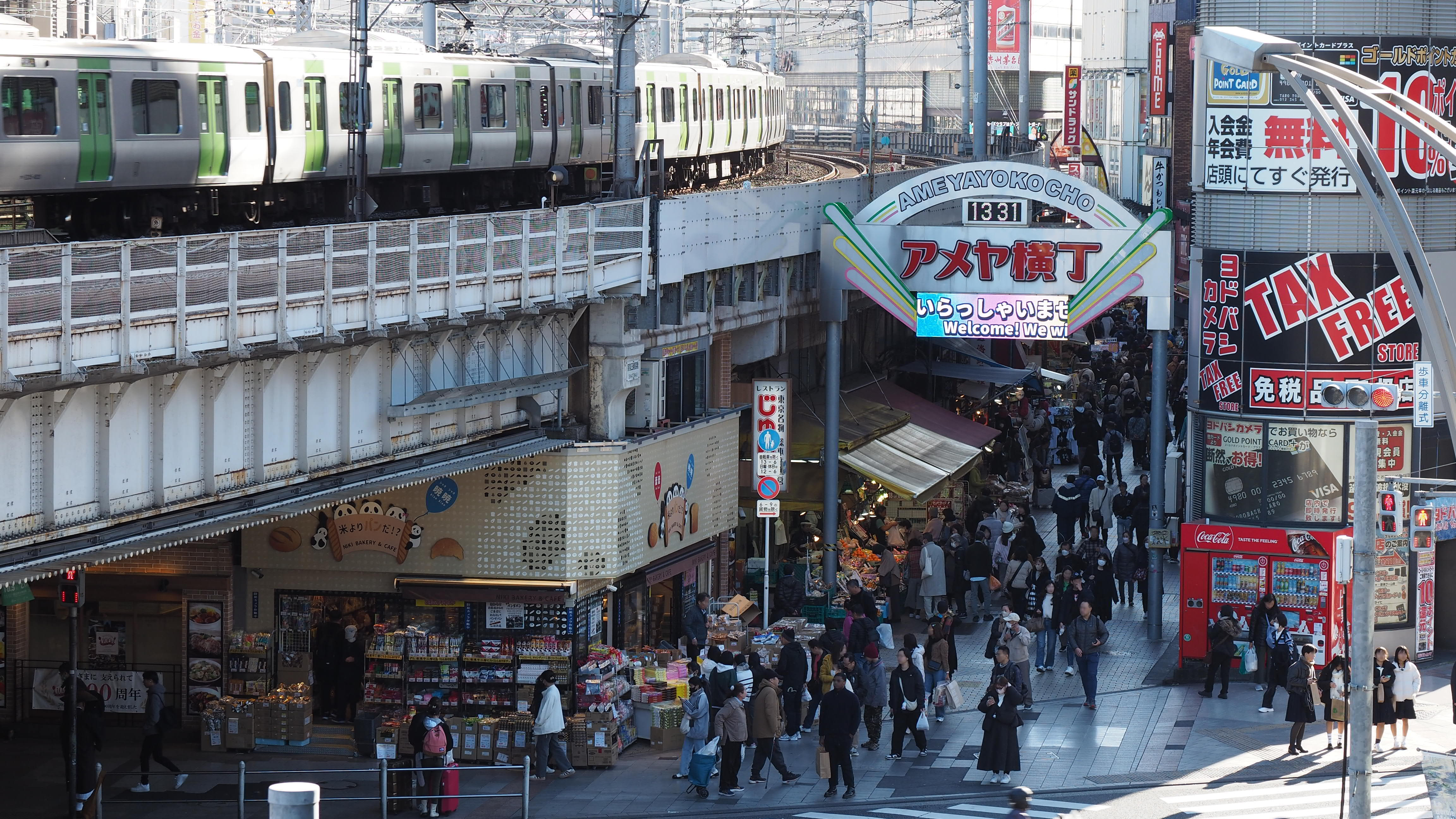
Entrance from the Ueno side (2024)

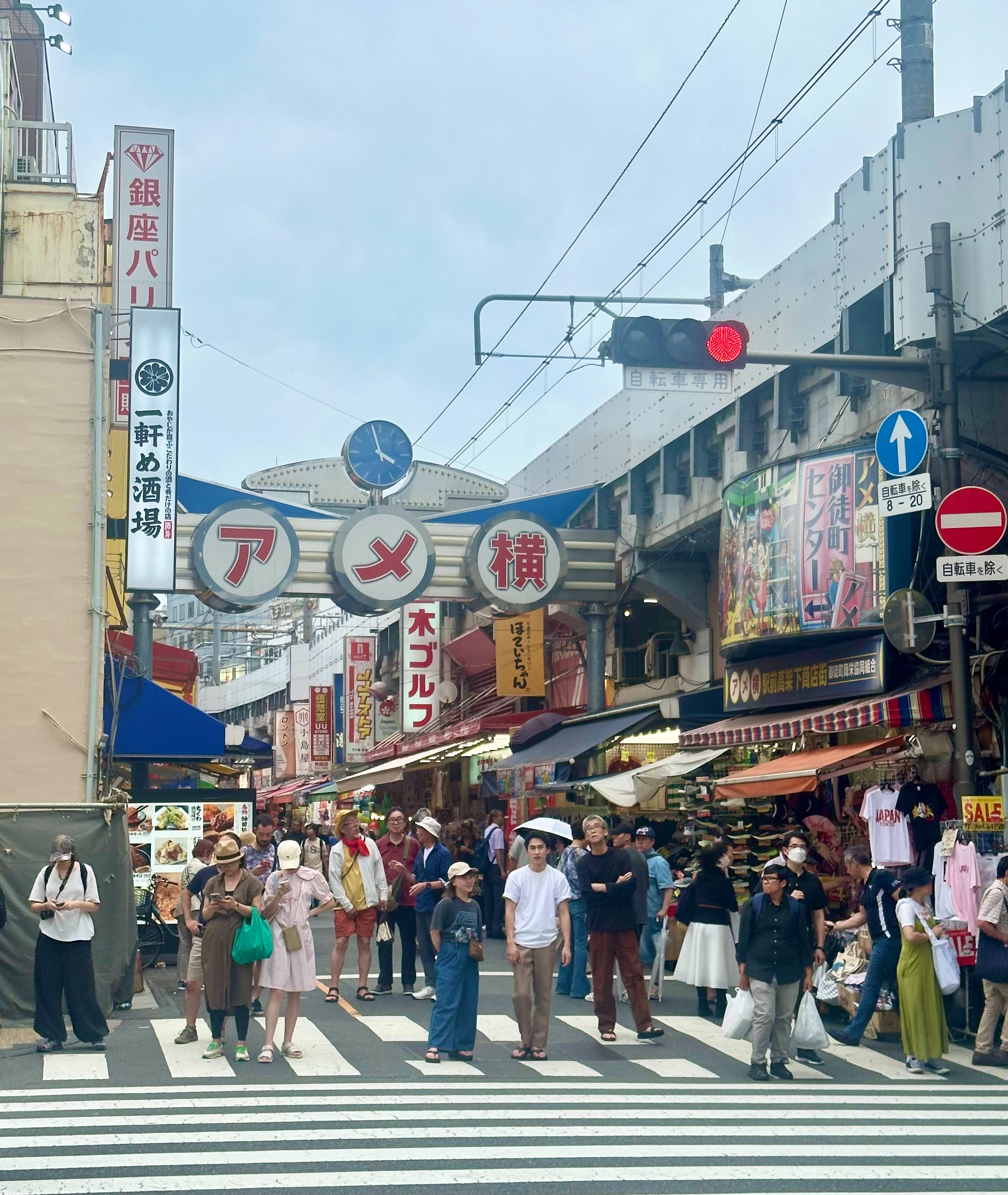
Entrance to Ameya-Yokochō as seen from the north exit of Okachimachi Station (2024)

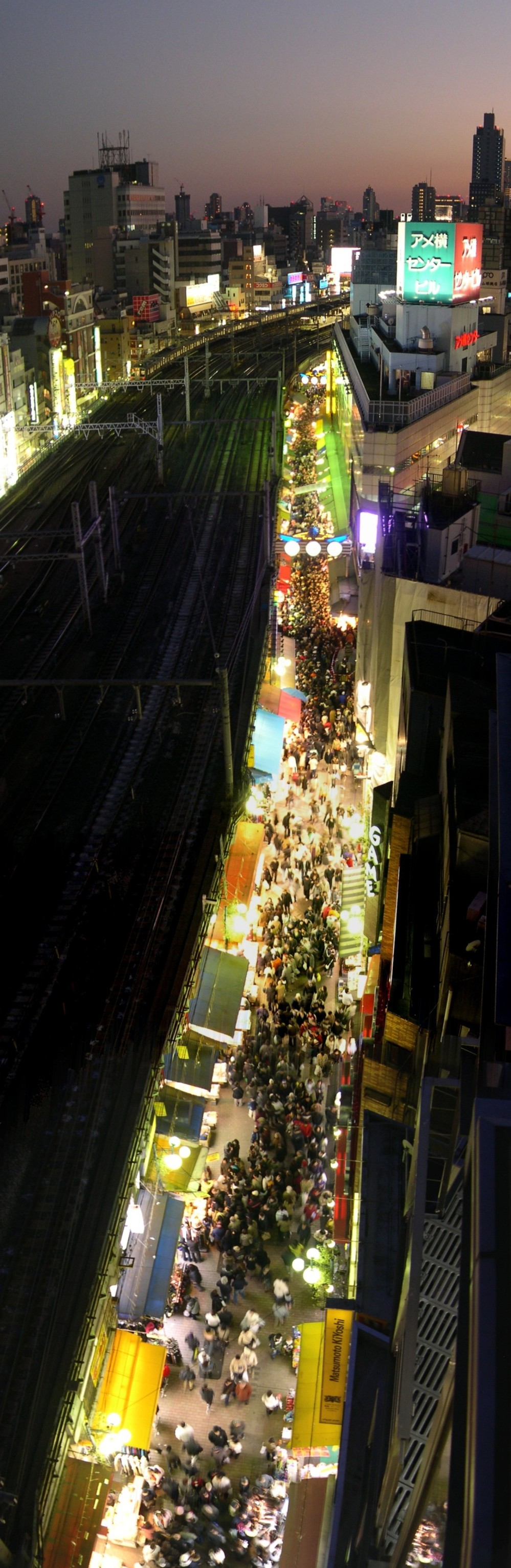
The New Year rush in 2006 as seen from the Ueno side looking towards Okachimachi Station

Ameya-Yokochō (アメヤ横丁; "Ameya alley"), often shortened to Ameyoko (アメ横), is an open-air market in the Taito Ward of Tokyo, Japan, located next to Ueno Station.

The market is approximately 164,227 square feet (15,257 m^{2}) in area, starting just behind the Yodobashi Camera building and following the Yamanote Line south until the Komuro building.

There are two theories on the etymology of Ameya. The first is that the name came from ameya (飴屋, "candy shop"), because of all the candy stores that lined the street in the early post-war era when sugar was hard to come by. Even now, there are stores selling candy there. The second theory is that it refers to アメリカ (America); there used to be stores selling surplus American army goods just after World War II. In either case, it is now commonly referred to simply as ameyoko.

The market is home to over two hundred and fifty shops, which sell products ranging from food to clothing and other merchandise.

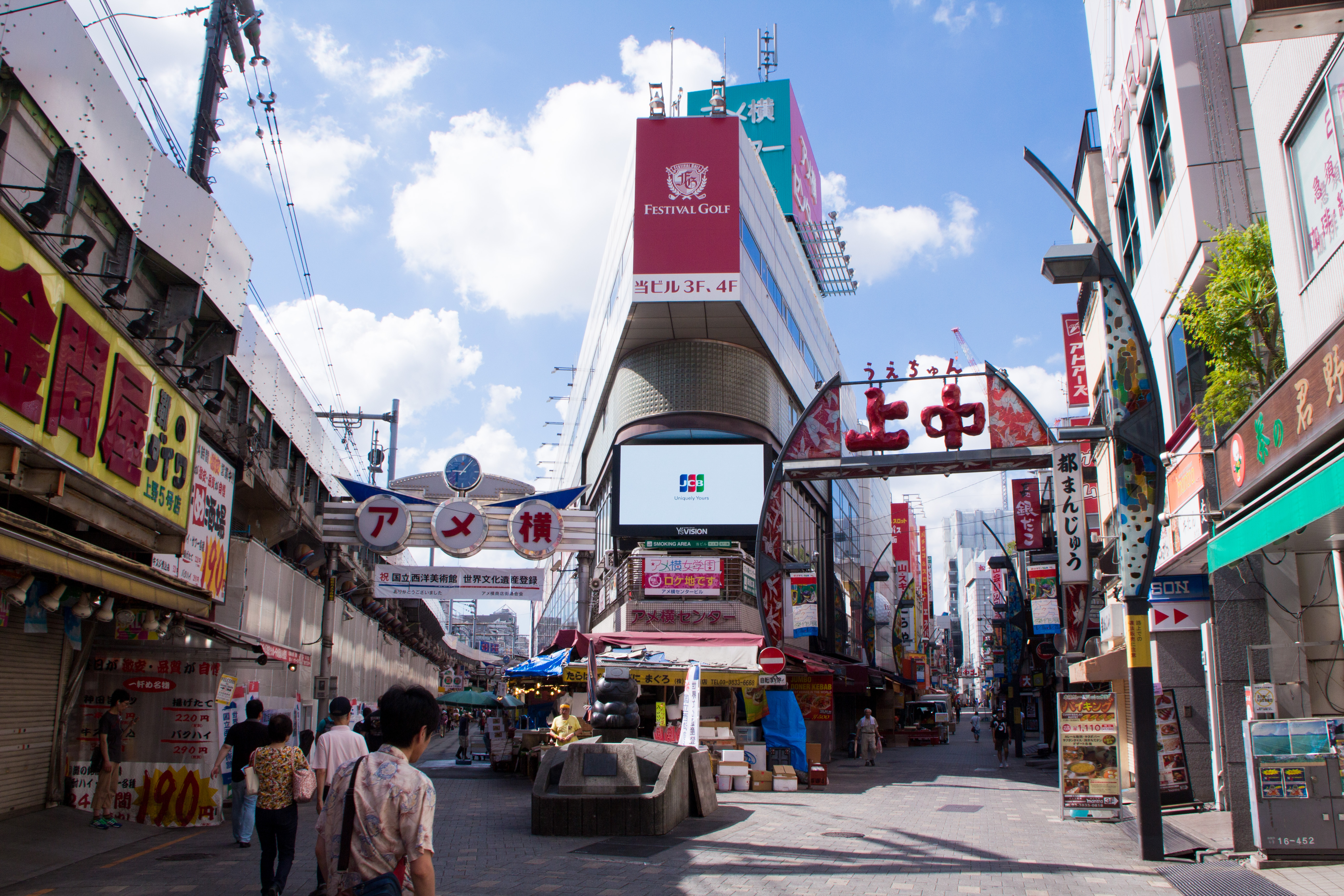
North Entrance (JR Line Yamanote Line on Left, Yodobashi Camera on Right)

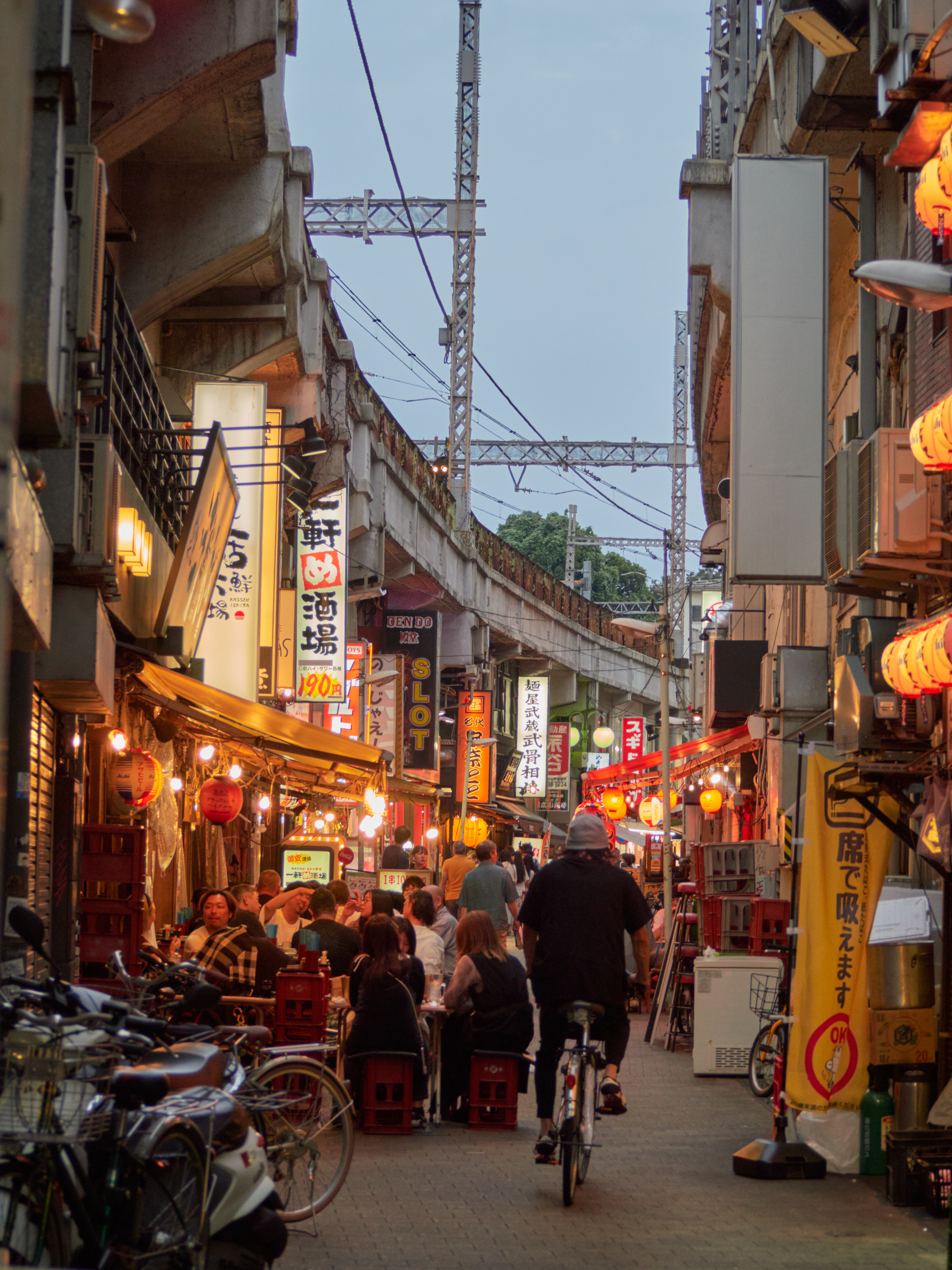
A narrow alley beneath an elevated railway structure in Ameyoko, Ueno

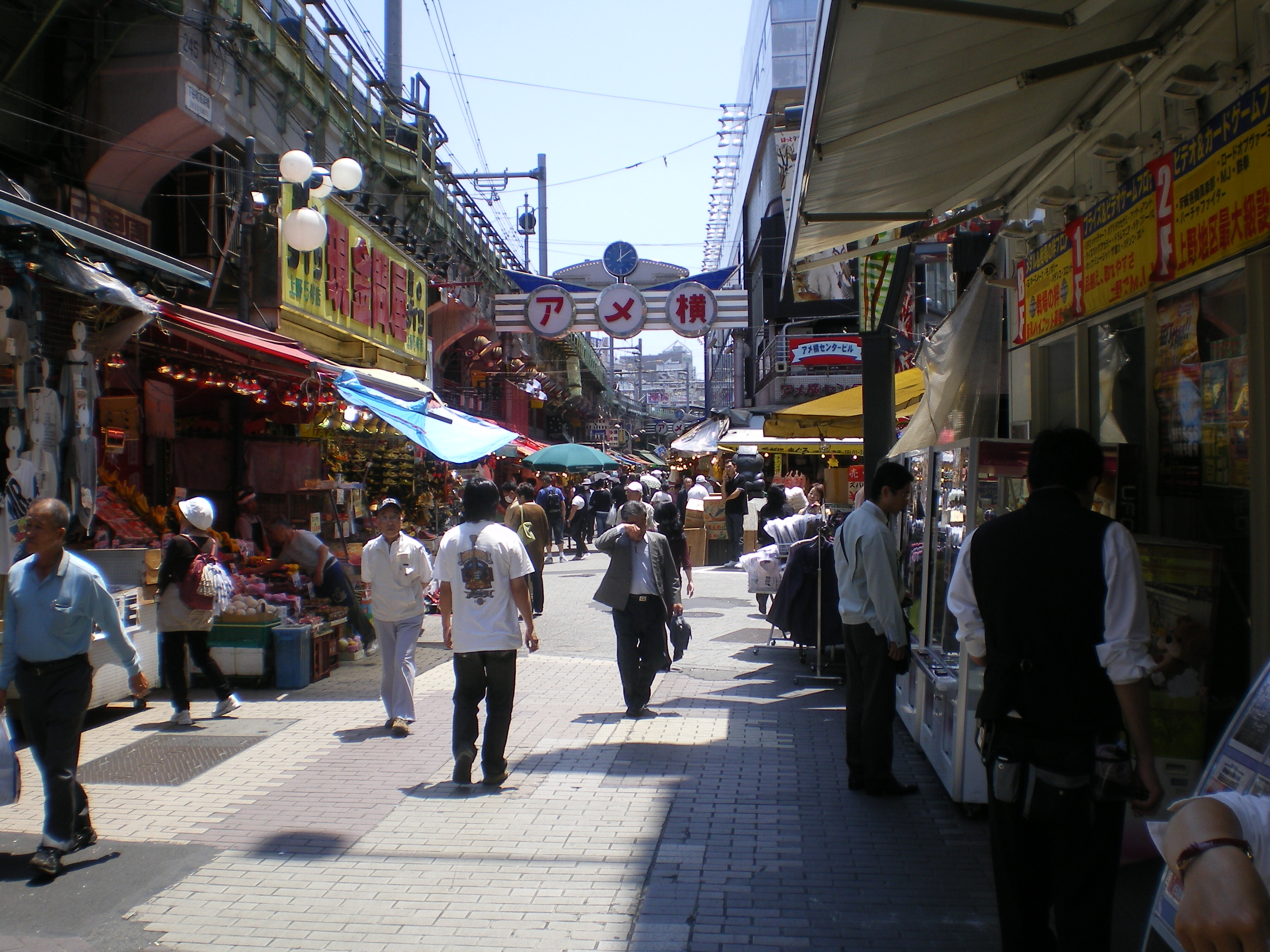
Shops

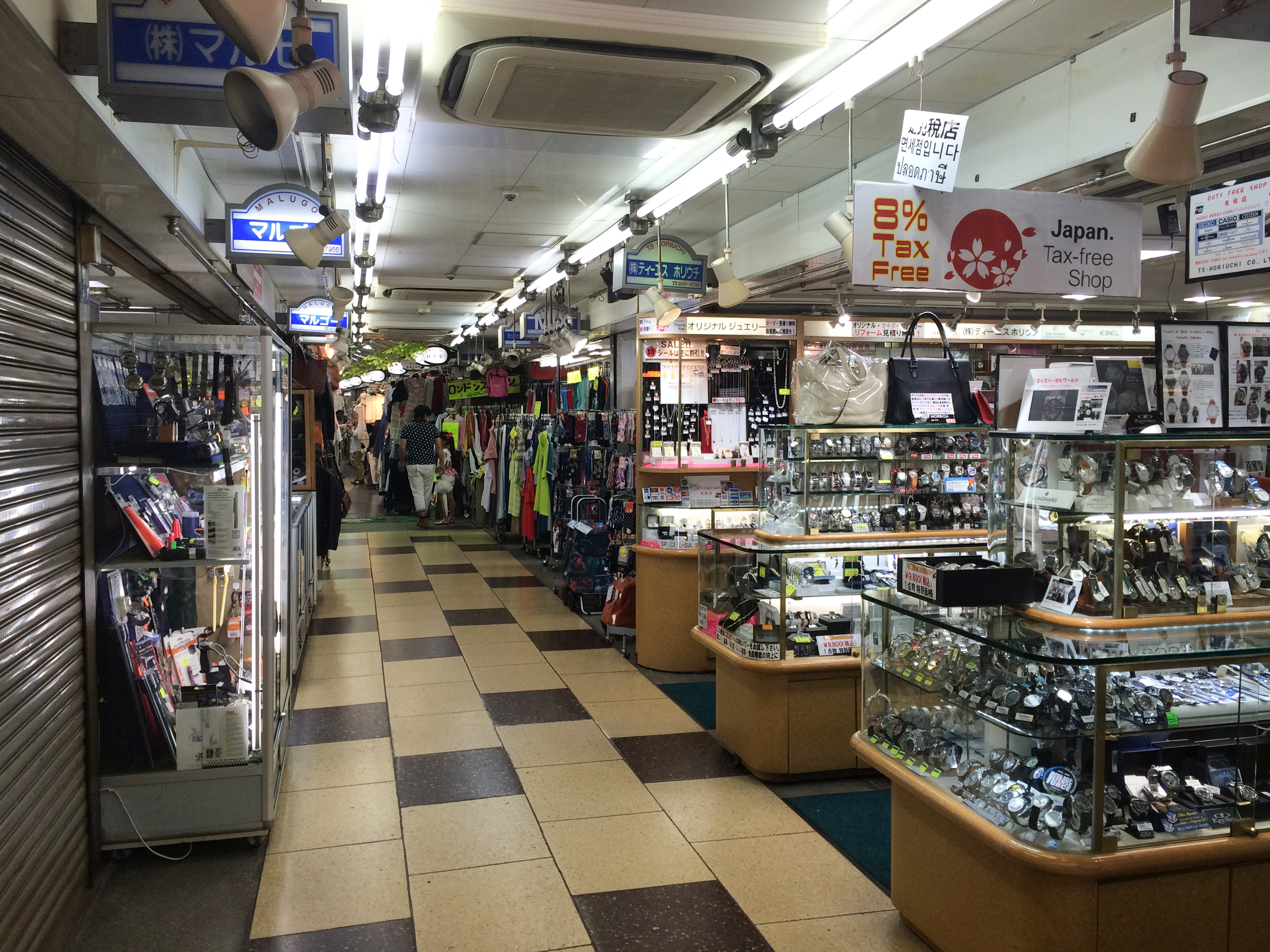
Shops under JR track

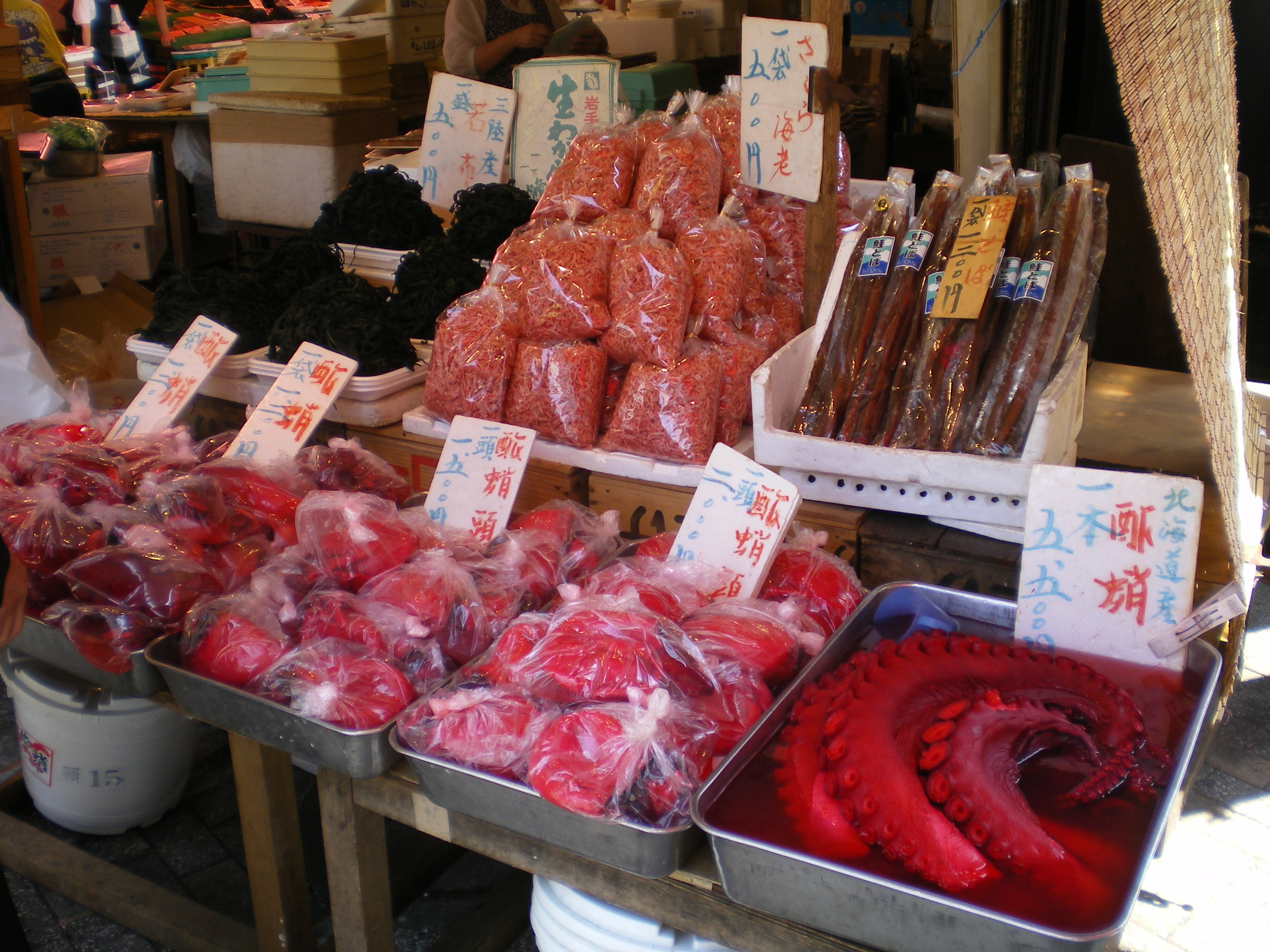
Seafood Stand

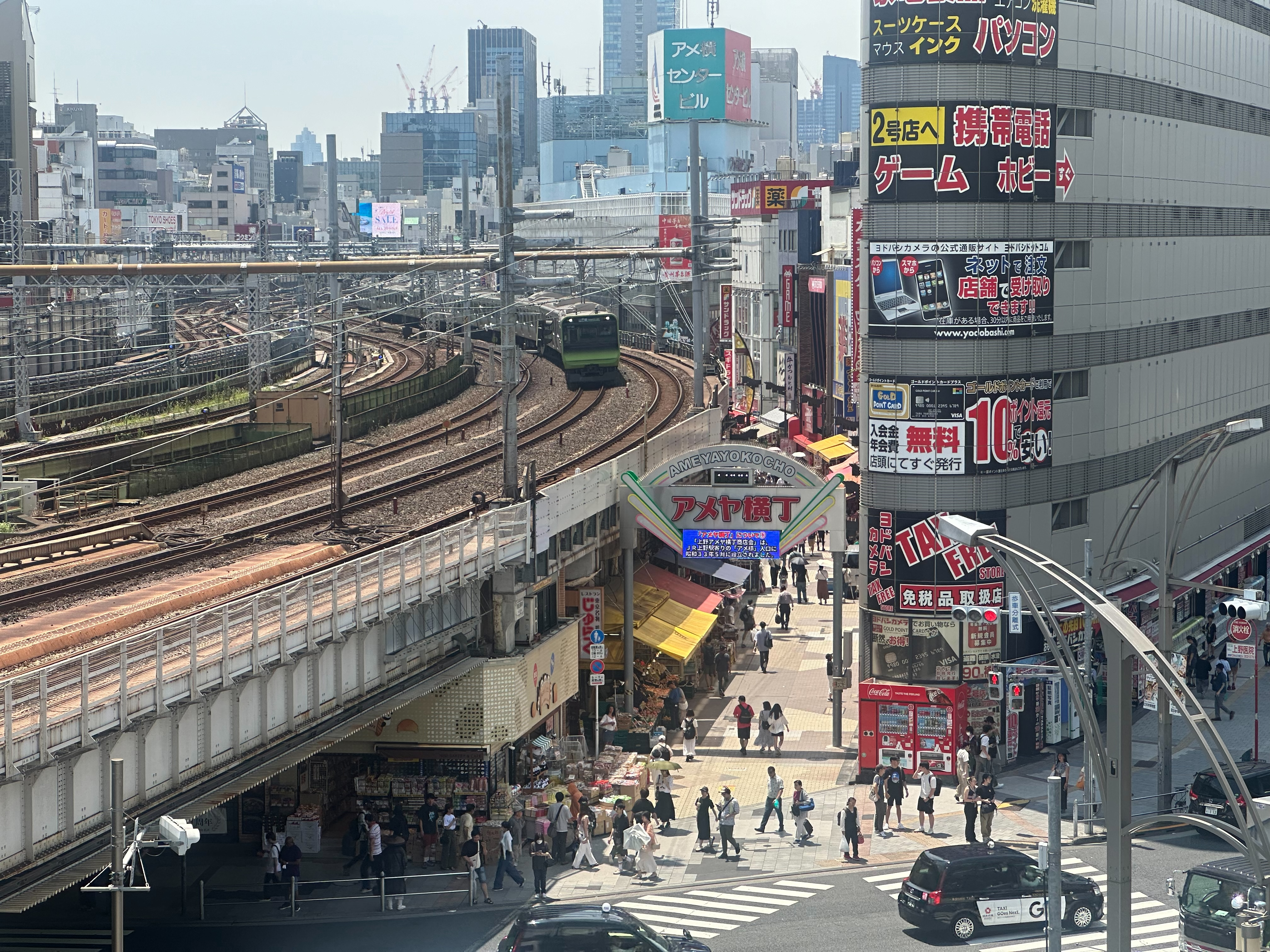
North Entrance Sign, 2024

A few Ameya-Yokochō scenes in December, 2021

== See also ==
- Yokochō
