= Ikebukuro =

Town within Toshima-ku, Japan

Coordinates: 35°43′48″N 139°42′40″E

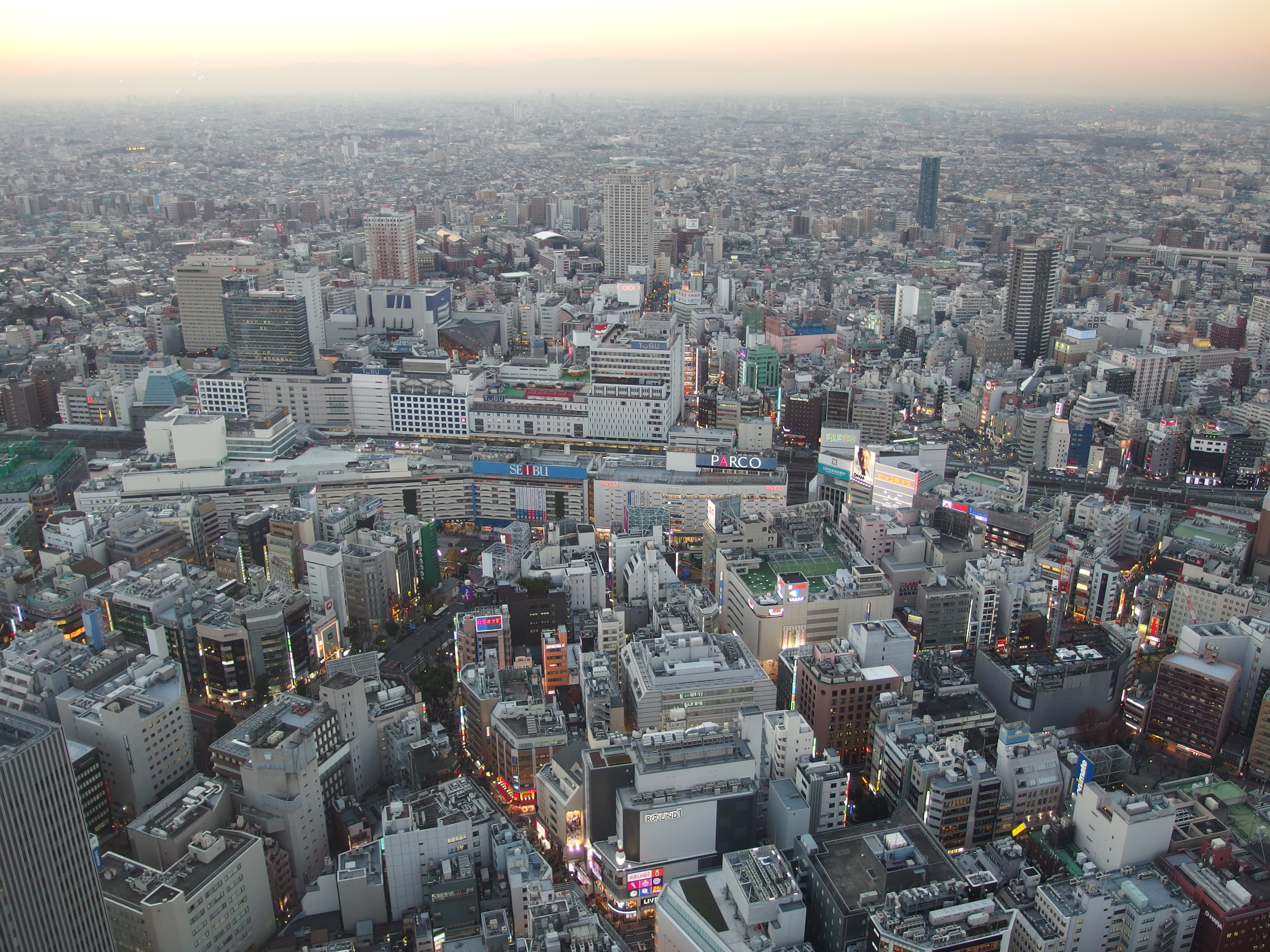
Ikebukuro skyscrapers

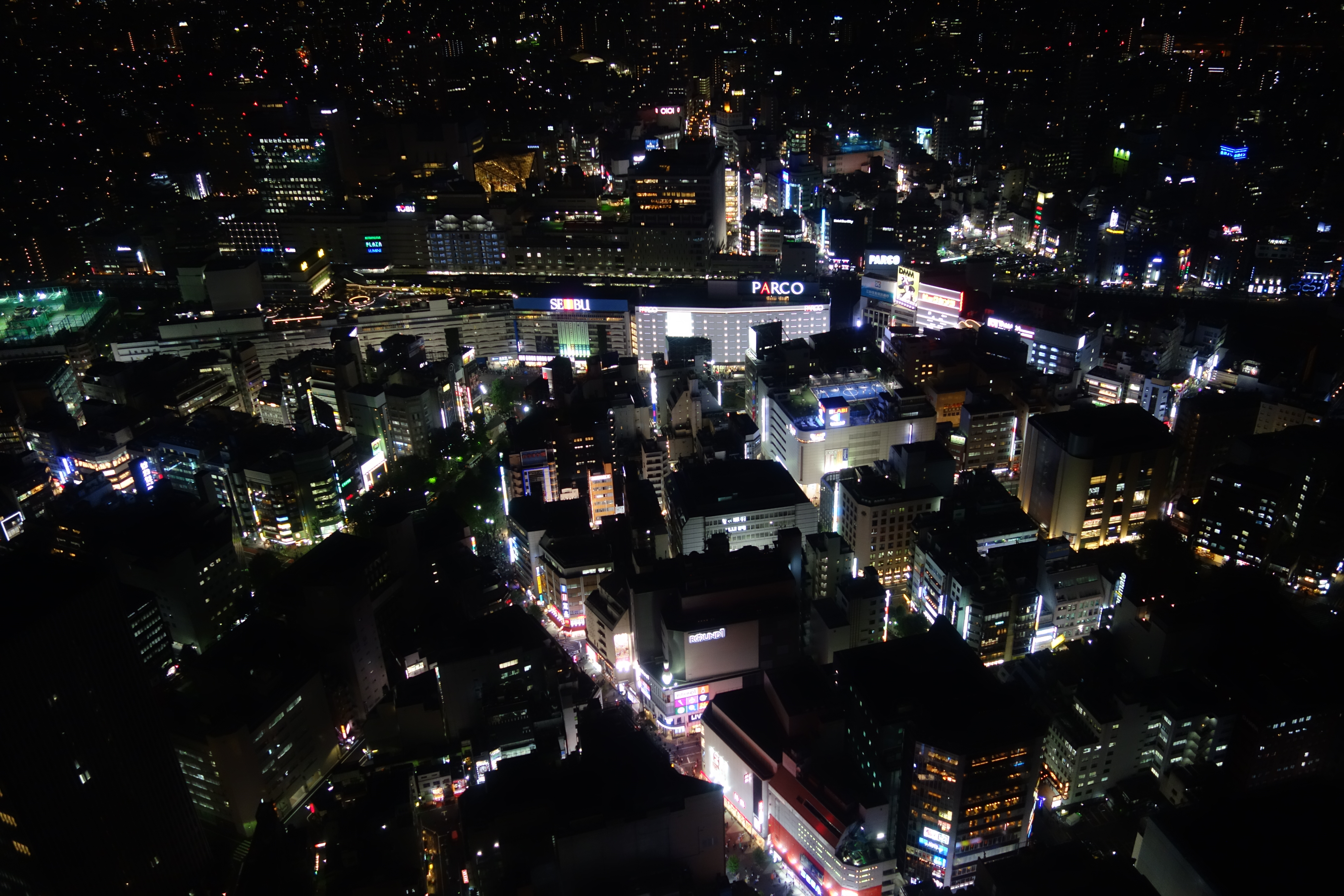
Ikebukuro Station as seen from the Sunshine 60 building

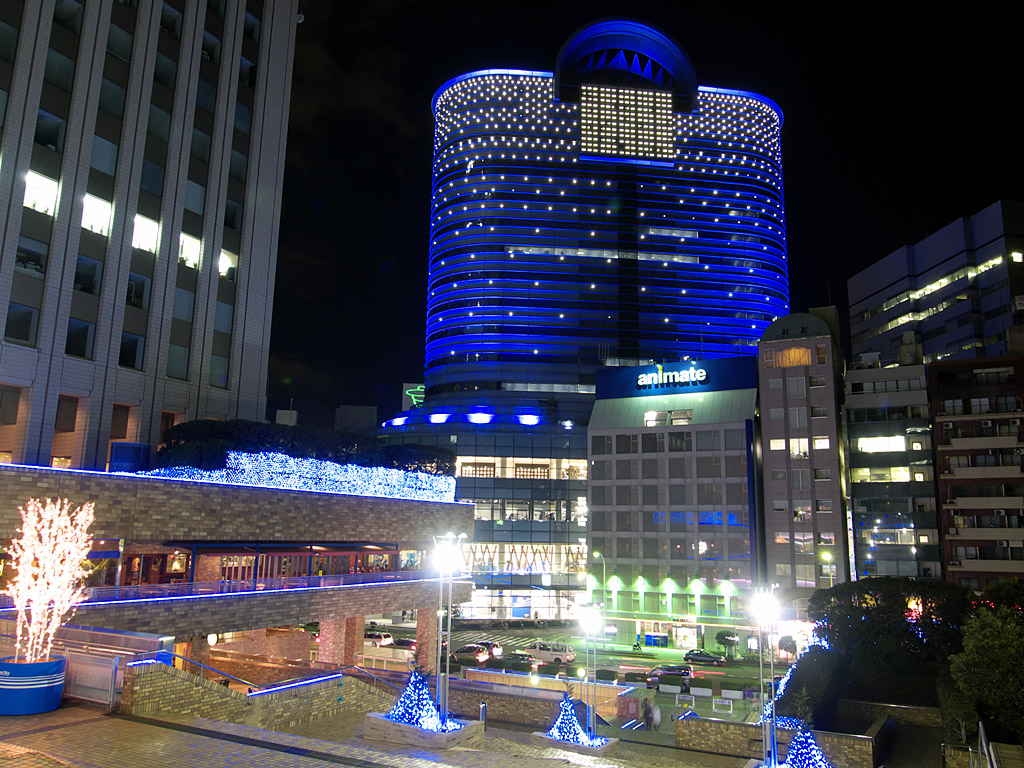
Toyota AMLUX (アムラックス)

Ikebukuro (池袋; [ikebɯkɯɾo]) is a district in Toshima, Tokyo, Japan. Centered around Ikebukuro Station, the third-busiest railway station in Japan, it serves as one of Tokyo's major commercial and entertainment districts and is considered a primary urban hub of northern Tokyo. Notable landmarks in Ikebukuro include the Toshima Ward Office, the Sunshine City complex and the flagship department stores of Seibu and Tōbu.

Since the 1980s, Ikebukuro has also developed as a major residential center of the Chinese community in Tokyo.

== Etymology ==
The kanji for Ikebukuro literally means "pond bag" (池袋). Outside the west exit of Ikebukuro Station near an entrance to the Fukutoshin Line is a small plaque explaining how the area used to have multiple lakes, hence the name. There is a small statue of an owl located near the center of the city called Ikefukurō-zō (池梟像), meaning pond owl statue. It is a play on words, as "owl" (梟 fukurō) is pronounced similarly to "bag" (袋 fukuro). The owl statue has become a famous meeting place along the lines of the statue of Hachikō located outside Shibuya Station.

== History ==
The old village of Ikebukuro stands to the northwest of the station. Most of the area on which modern Ikebukuro is built was historically known as Sugamo. In the Taishō and Shōwa periods, the relatively low land prices attracted artists and foreign workers, who lent a somewhat cosmopolitan atmosphere to Ikebukuro. Until October 1, 1932 when Toshima ward was established, the area was an independent municipality of Ikebukuro-mura (池袋村).

== Transportation ==
At the center of Ikebukuro is the train and subway station, a huge urban gathering shared by the JR East lines, the Seibu Ikebukuro Line and the Tōbu Tōjō Line. It is one of the main commuter hubs in the western Yamanote area of Tokyo. Ikebukuro Station is the third-busiest station in Japan, and the world.

== Cultural attractions ==
The Tokyo Metropolitan Theater is also located near Ikebukuro Station. Opened in 1990, the theater hosts concert, dance, and theater performances.

In July 2020, Hareza Ikebukuro, a cultural hub that includes the Hareza Tower and eight theaters, including the Tokyo Tatemono Brillia Hall opened around the site of the former Toshima Ward Office.

Mikuni Alley in 2026

In the Nishiikebukuro district, a school designed by the American architect Frank Lloyd Wright is located. Named Jiyū Gakuen Myōnichikan, it was built in 1921 and is opened to visitors.

The historic yokochōs of Sakaemachi Street and Mikuni Alley are just east of Ikebukuro Station.

== Shopping ==
Around the station are the Seibu and Tōbu department stores. Seibu, written with the characters for "West" and "Musashi (province)" (西武), is on the east end of the station and Tōbu, written with the characters for "East" and "Musashi" (東武), is on the west end. East of the station, on the site of Sugamo Prison, stands Sunshine 60, which was the tallest building in Asia at the time of its construction.

Opened in 1978, Sunshine 60 contains Sunshine City, a large and popular shopping mall with various attractions including an aquarium, a Pokémon Center and cat cafés. Adjacent to Sunshine City, on Meiji Dori, is what was previously called the Toyota Ikebukuro Building which housed a multi-floor Toyota Autosalon Amlux showroom from 2000 to 2013. The building is now called Sunshine City Annex since 2019. Otome Road, a center for otaku culture and shopping district for anime and manga aimed at women, is located nearby. Marui and Don Quijote also have department stores in the area. The principal electronics retailer in Ikebukuro is Bic Camera. There is a small pleasure district located in Nishi-Ikebukuro, similar to Shinjuku's Kabukichō.

In 2026, the Pokémon center closed for several months following a murder of a cashier in April before reopening at the end of August.

== Tokyo Chinatown ==
Ikebukuro is home to many ethnic Chinese who arrived in the 1980s, leading to a variety of Chinese goods and services being provided in the district, which are popular among tourists interested in Chinese culture. However, the Ikebukuro Chinatown is smaller and less populous than Yokohama's Chinatown just to the south of Tokyo.

== Education ==
Public elementary and junior high schools are operated by the Toshima Ward Board of Education.

Ikebukuro Elementary School (豊島区立池袋小学校) is in Ikebukuro. Ikebukuro itself is zoned to Ikebukuro Elementary School and Nishi Ikebukuro Junior High School (西池袋中学校), the latter in Nishi Ikebukuro. Ikebukuro Junior High School (池袋中学校) is in Ikebukuro Honchō and does not serve Ikebukuro proper.

Public high schools are operated by the Tokyo Metropolitan Government Board of Education.

Rikkyo Ikebukuro Junior and Senior High School, a private secondary school, is in the area.

Universities near Ikebukuro station include Rikkyo University and Tokyo International University.

== Organized crime ==
The Kyokuto-kai (yakuza syndicate) is headquartered in Ikebukuro.

== In popular culture ==
- Ikebukuro is the setting of the Japanese manga and TV drama Ikebukuro West Gate Park.
- Ikebukuro is the setting of the Japanese light novel, anime, and manga series Durarara!!.
- "Ikebukuro" is the name of a 16-minute-long track from the Brian Eno album, The Shutov Assembly.
- Ikebukuro is also represented in the multimedial project by King Records Hypnosis Mic: Division Rap Battle
- Ikebukuro is a common location in the Megami Tensei series of video games.
- The train station of Ikebukuro is featured in Lost Judgment.
