= Audley, Ontario =

Audley Brown's Corners
- Village
- Location in southern Ontario
- Coordinates: 43°54′11″N 79°0′42″W
- Country: Canada
- Province: Ontario
- County: York (until 1851), Ontario (1852 onwards)
- Township: Pickering
- Settled: Mid-19th century
- Merged with Ajax: 1974

Population (1857)
  - Total: 300
- Time zone: UTC-5 (EST)
  - Summer (DST): UTC-4 (EDT)
- Forward sortation area: L1Z
- Area codes: 905 and 289
- NTS Map: 030M14
- GNBC Code: FAEEC

Audley, known as Brown's Corners until 1857, was an unincorporated village in the Pickering Township of Ontario, Canada. In the mid-19th century, it emerged as a stopover for farmers traveling to the Whitby port, and gradually evolved into a village.

Audley was located around what is now the intersection of Audley Road and Taunton Road in Ajax. In 1974, it became a part of the town of Ajax, and its name survives in Audley North and Audley South neighbourhoods of the town.

== Establishment ==
By the mid-19th century, the central and southern parts of what is now Ajax were occupied by farms and businesses. Therefore, many newcomers settled further north, establishing a hamlet that evolved into the village of Audley. The hamlet was located around the sideline (now Audley Road) between Lots 2 and 3 of the 4th concession (now Taunton Road). The area was originally known as Brown's Corners, after Abraham Brown (the owner of the local Audley Hotel), and was renamed Audley in 1857.

The early settlers of Audley mainly included the English, the Scots, the Irish migrants escaping the Great Famine, and the Quakers from New England whose advocacy for pacifism had invoked hostility there.

- The English migrants included the families of Alexander Dunlop, John Elliot (later Elliott), Isaac Puckrin, Richard Squire, John Bell, George Walters and John Edwards.
- The Scots included George McGillivray, Duncan McLaren, James Madill, William Smith, Arthur Boyes and William Dickie.
- The Irish settlers included the Haney, Moore, MacDonald, McBrady, McCann, McCarthy, McQuay, O'Brady, O'Connor, O'Grady, O'Leary and Raney families.
- The Quaker families were those of Ambrose Boon, James Brown, James Carpenter, Joseph Chapman, Cornelius Churchill, Richard Dale, Caleb Stickney, Joseph Webster and Geth Wilson.

In 1857, Audley had a population of around 300.

Some residents of Audley

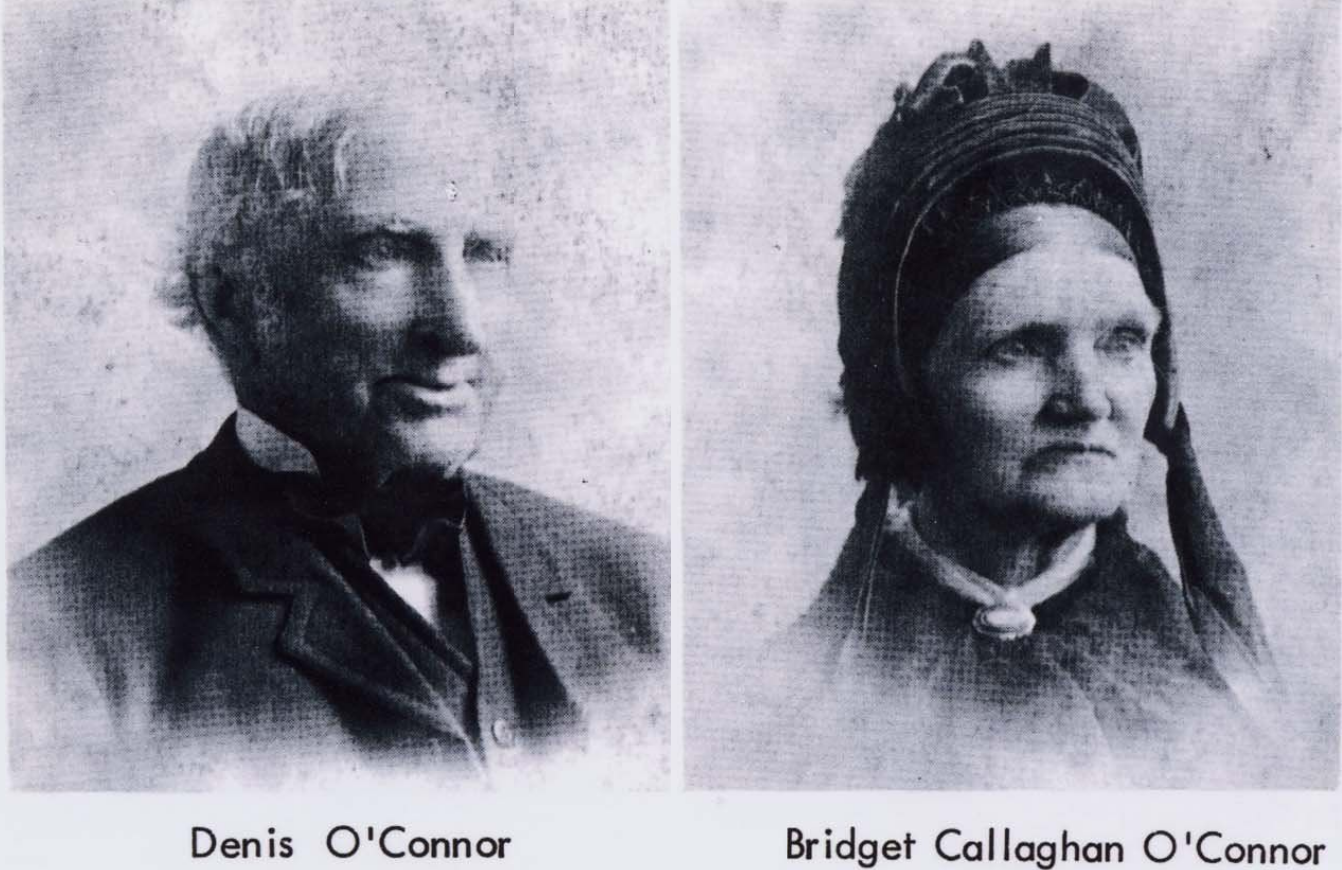
Dennis O'Connor, the father of Archbishop Denis O'Connor, with his second wife Bridget Callaghan

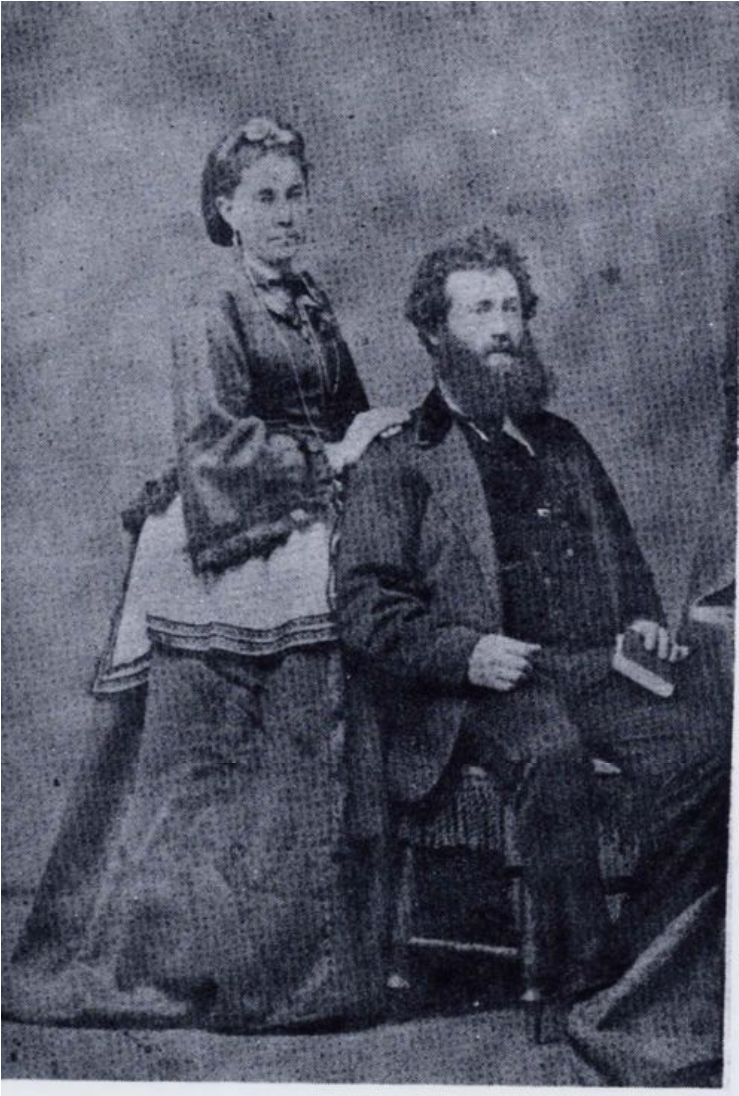
Timothy O'Leary (a cousin of the Archbishop's mother) with his wife

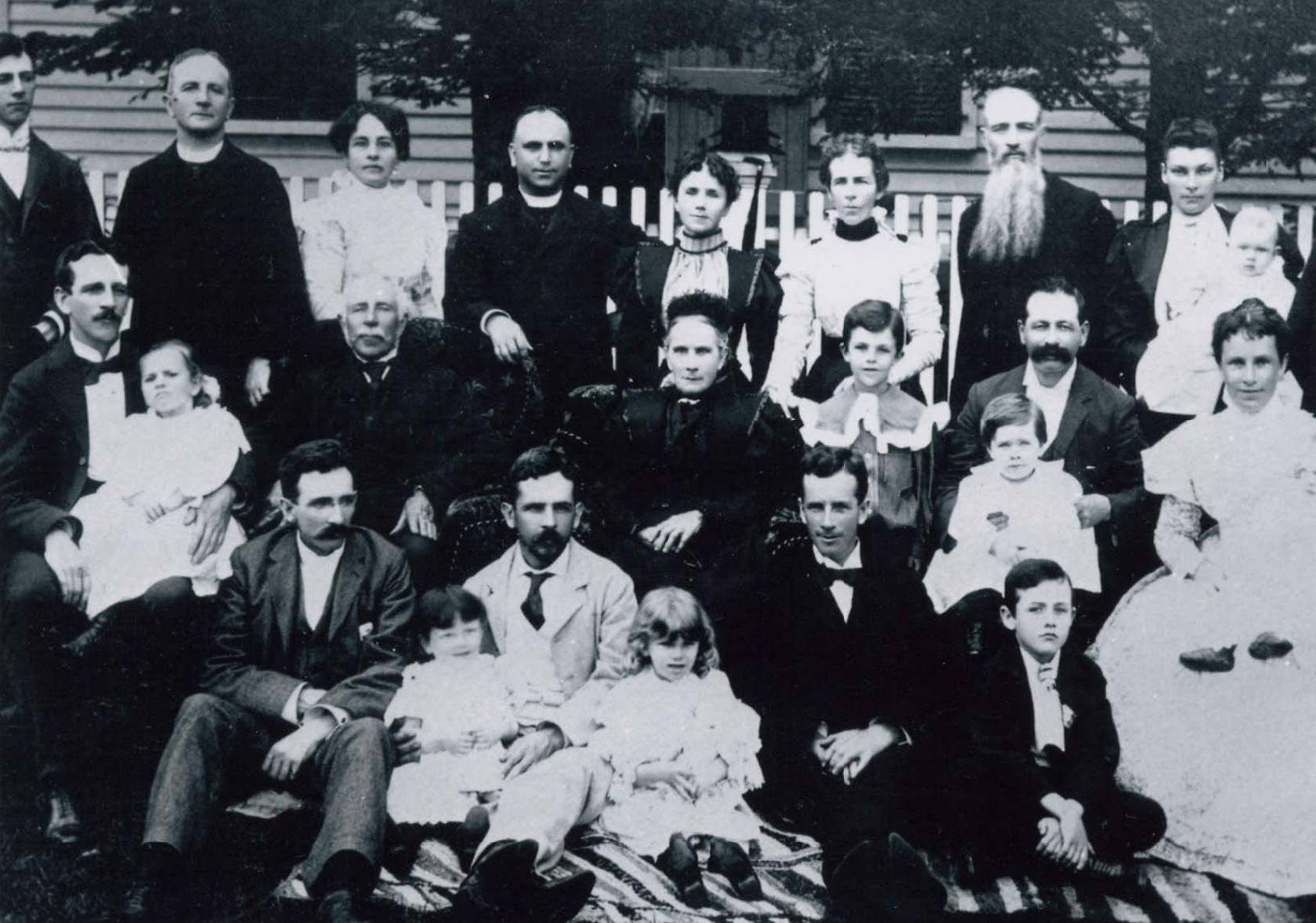
McBrady family, who lived at the south-west corner of Audley Road and Taunton Road, 1897

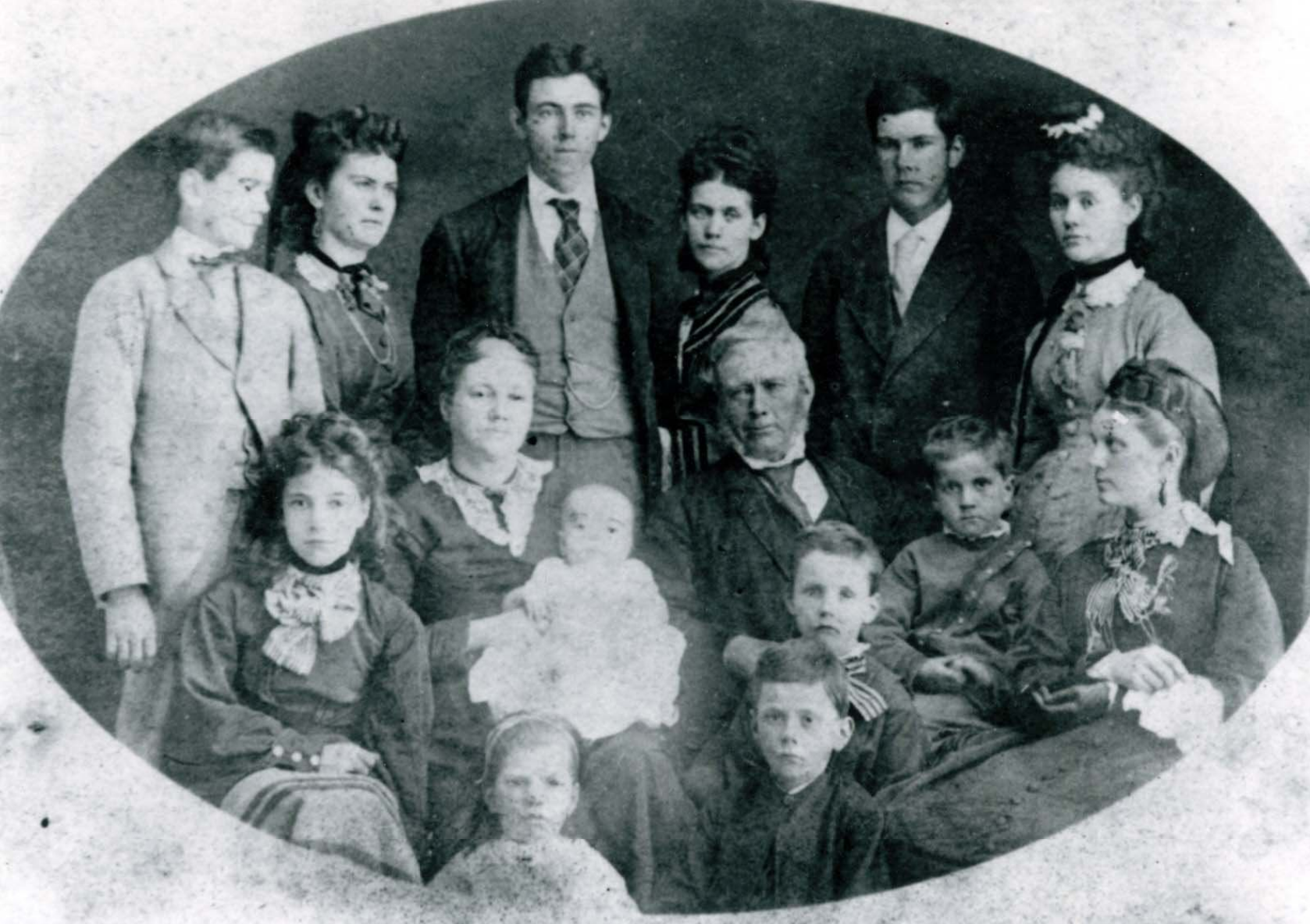
McGillivary family

== Businesses ==
Audley developed as a stopover for people traveling to the port of Whitby, and as a commercial centre for farmers from the surrounding area. The Audley Hotel became an overnight stop for the farmers, most of them from areas north of Audley, taking their produce to Whitby in their wagons.

The Audley Hotel, built around 1850, was a major landmark of the village. Its owner Abraham Brown also ran a bar, and kept a menagerie of caged wild animals near the hotel. An outdoor sports space near the hotel was a popular venue for football games and horse-racing. The bar, the menagerie, and the sports space made the area a popular weekend attraction. On Saturdays, men from the surrounding areas converged at Audley for drinking and sports, and often engaged in unruly behavior including fights. The local Methodist Church was established to discourage this behavior, and partnered with the Temperance Society to campaign against the consumption of alcohol. As a result, the Hotel lost its patrons, and shut down in 1859. Nevertheless, private stills operated in many homes.

In the second half of the 19th century, Audley had several small businesses. Eluid Chapman ran a workshop producing coffins, frames for windows and doors ("sashes"), doors, plough handles, furniture and tools. Richard Valentine operated a lime kiln, and a man named Wingmore ran an ashery. The village also had two blacksmiths, a cobbler, a tanner, a butcher, a wagon-dealer, a paint shop, and a general store.

In the late 19th century, a fall in the demand for wheat led to economic decline in the Pickering Township. An economic depression in the last decade of the century resulted in the closure of several mills and small businesses. The village of Audley was especially affected by the depression.

== Education ==
The Audley Public School was established in 1840, in a one-room log building on Lot 10 of Concession Road 3. In 1850, it moved to a new log building on the same lot. In 1856, it moved to a private home on Concession Road 4. Subsequently, the school existed in a frame building on Lot 7 of Concession Road 3, now the south-west corner of Taunton Road and Salem Road. After a fire destroyed the frame building in 1865, the school moved to a brick building on the same site in 1866. The new brick building cost $1,138 and housed the school for next 98 years.

The school organized several events such as Arbor Day tree planting, a "Union picnic" with other nearby schools in the 1880s, a school fair that was first held in 1915, and a general exhibit at Brougham in partnership with other schools.

Initially, the school had only one classroom and one teacher. As the number of students increased, in 1955, a partition was installed to make two classrooms, and a second teacher was hired. In 1963, a new three-room brick building was erected for the school at a cost of $50,000, and the school moved to this building in May 1964. The Audley Public School closed in the 1970s, when a consolidation of schools in the area took place, and school buses were introduced to take the local students to other schools. In 1981, the FaithWay Baptist Church purchased the school site.

== Church ==
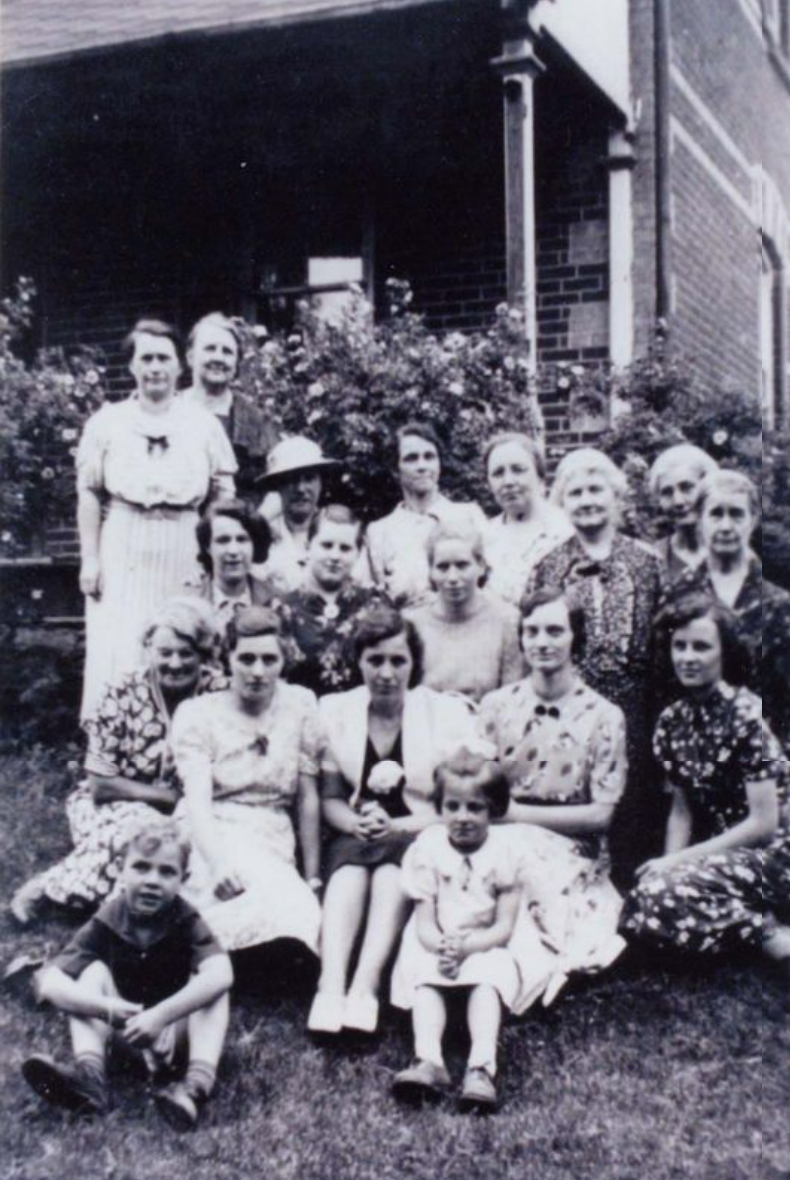
Women's Association of Audley United Church, c. 1940

John Nattress, a circuit rider from the Markham Methodist Church Circuit, proposed setting up a church in Audley after witnessing the unruly behavior by drunken men in the area. Nattress and fellow preacher Benjamin Haigh held several meetings in the homes of local families that supported the idea. In the 1860s, James Madill and John Lawrence built a frame building for the church, on land donated by William and Jane Bell, with funds from several local residents. The building was first used as a Primitive Methodist Sunday school, and then as a church.

The Audley Methodist Church building hosted several other organizations including the Epworth League, the Christian Endeavour, and the Temperance League. Its campaign against alcohol led to the closure of the Audley Hotel. The Church subsequently moved to Claremont in present-day city of Pickering. The Audley Methodist Church became part of the United Church of Canada in 1925.

In the 1950s, the frame building was demolished to erect a larger brick building that could accommodate the growing congregation. The new building was designed by architect John Layng of Toronto, and built by Miller Construction of Oshawa. It was dedicated on 6 January 1957. The construction cost $15,000, and was supported by several local families that donated cash and furniture.

The Church was supported by a women's group that existed as the Ladies Aid of Audley Methodist Church (1908-1919), and the Women's Association of Audley United Church (1928-1944). The Women's Association merged with the Women's Missionary Society in 1944, which merged with the United Church Women in 1962.

== Post Office ==
In 1853, the Audley Post Office opened with the hotel owner Abraham Brown as the first postmaster. The Post Office operated until 1914, with another 11 people serving as the postmasters at various times. The total revenue of the Audley Post Office during the period of July 1882 to June 1886 was $173.80. The postmasters were paid poorly ($10 a year in 1887 and $20 a year in 1894), and were expected to operate the Post Office from their private residences. Because of this, the Post Office closed for several periods when three of the postmasters quit their job. During the 1887 closure, the local residents offered postmaster Francis Harvey $25 to keep the Post Office open. The Post Office closed at the start of World War I in 1914, and was replaced by rural letter carriers. In 1974, the Audley village became a part of the town of Ajax within the Regional Municipality of Durham. In January 1991, when the 9-1-1 emergency response service was installed in the Durham Region, the rural houses in the received numbers and the Ajax Post Office took over the rural mail delivery.

== Community Club ==
In 1926, the local residents established the Audley Community Club, which organized events such as plays, box socials, dances, baseball games, and picnics. At the time of its establishment, its annual membership fee was $1 for a family or 50 cents for an individual. The club was active until the 1990s.

== Notable people ==
- Daniel David Palmer (1845-1913), chiropractor, born in Brown's Corners (later Audley) and raised in Port Perry
- Denis O'Connor (1841-1911), Archbishop of Toronto, born to an Irish immigrant family of Audley
