= Izakaya =

Type of Japanese bar

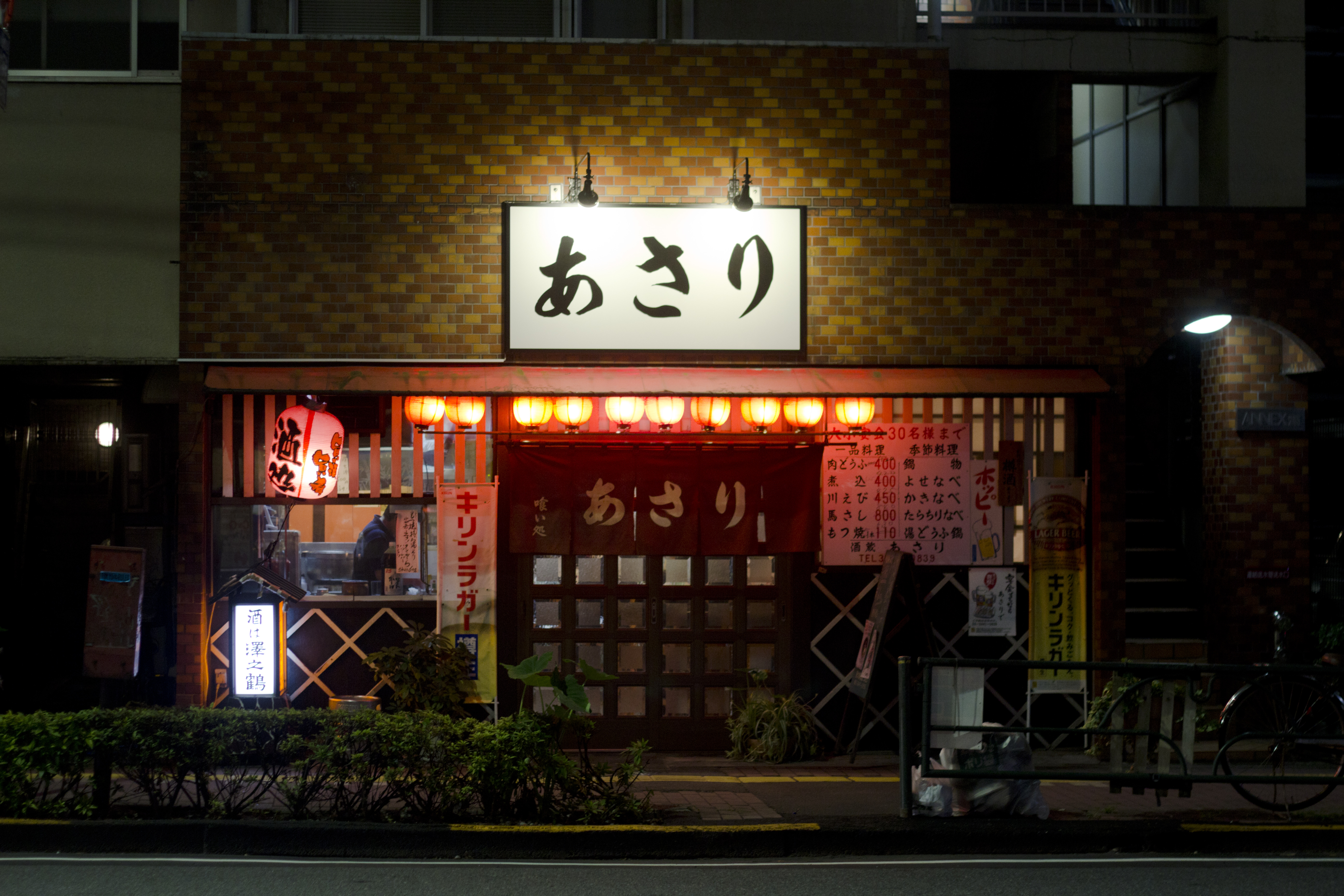
An izakaya in Gotanda, Tokyo. The signboard on the right shows a menu with regular dishes (left) and seasonal entrees – nabe (right).

An izakaya (居酒屋) (Japanese: [izakaja]) is a type of informal Japanese bar that serves alcoholic drinks and snacks. Izakaya are casual places for after-work drinking, similar to a pub, a Spanish tapas bar, or an American saloon or tavern. Several varieties of izakaya exist throughout Japan that serve a larger clientele than traditional izakaya or pubs. Typically, izakaya serve fried or grilled food designed to be shared with multiple people.

== Etymology ==
The word izakaya entered the English language by 1987. It is a compound word consisting of iru ("to stay") and sakaya ("sake shop"), indicating that izakaya originated from sake shops that allowed customers to sit on the premises to drink. Izakaya are sometimes called akachōchin ('red lantern') in daily conversation, as such paper lanterns are traditionally found in front of them.

== History ==
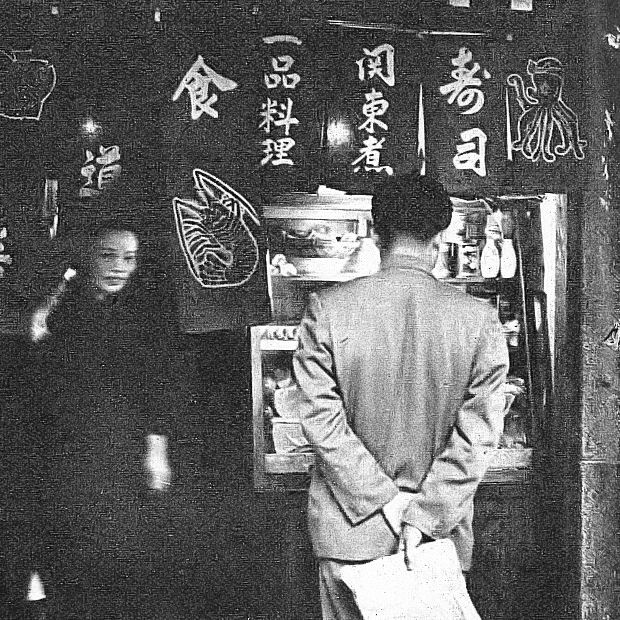
Taipei izakaya in 1951

Anecdotes and songs that appear in the Kojiki show that izakaya-style establishments existed in Japan at the early 700s. There is a record dating to 733 when rice was collected as a brewing fee tax under the jurisdiction of the government office called Miki no Tsukasa. In the Shoku Nihongi, written in 797, there is a record of King Ashihara who got drunk and was murdered in a tavern in 761.

The full-scale development of izakaya began around the Edo period (1603–1867). At liquor stores that used to sell alcohol by weight, people began to drink alcohol while standing. Gradually, some izakaya began using sake barrels as stools for their customers, and gradually began to offer simple snacks called sakana. Historian Penelope Francks points to the development of the izakaya in Japan, especially in Edo and along main roads throughout the country, as one indicator of the growing popularity of sake as a consumer good by the late 1700s.

An izakaya in Tokyo made international news in 1962 when Robert F. Kennedy ate there during a meeting with Japanese labor leaders.

Izakaya and other small pubs or establishments are exempted from an indoor smoking ban that was passed by the National Diet in July 2018 and fully enforced since April 2020.

== Dining style ==
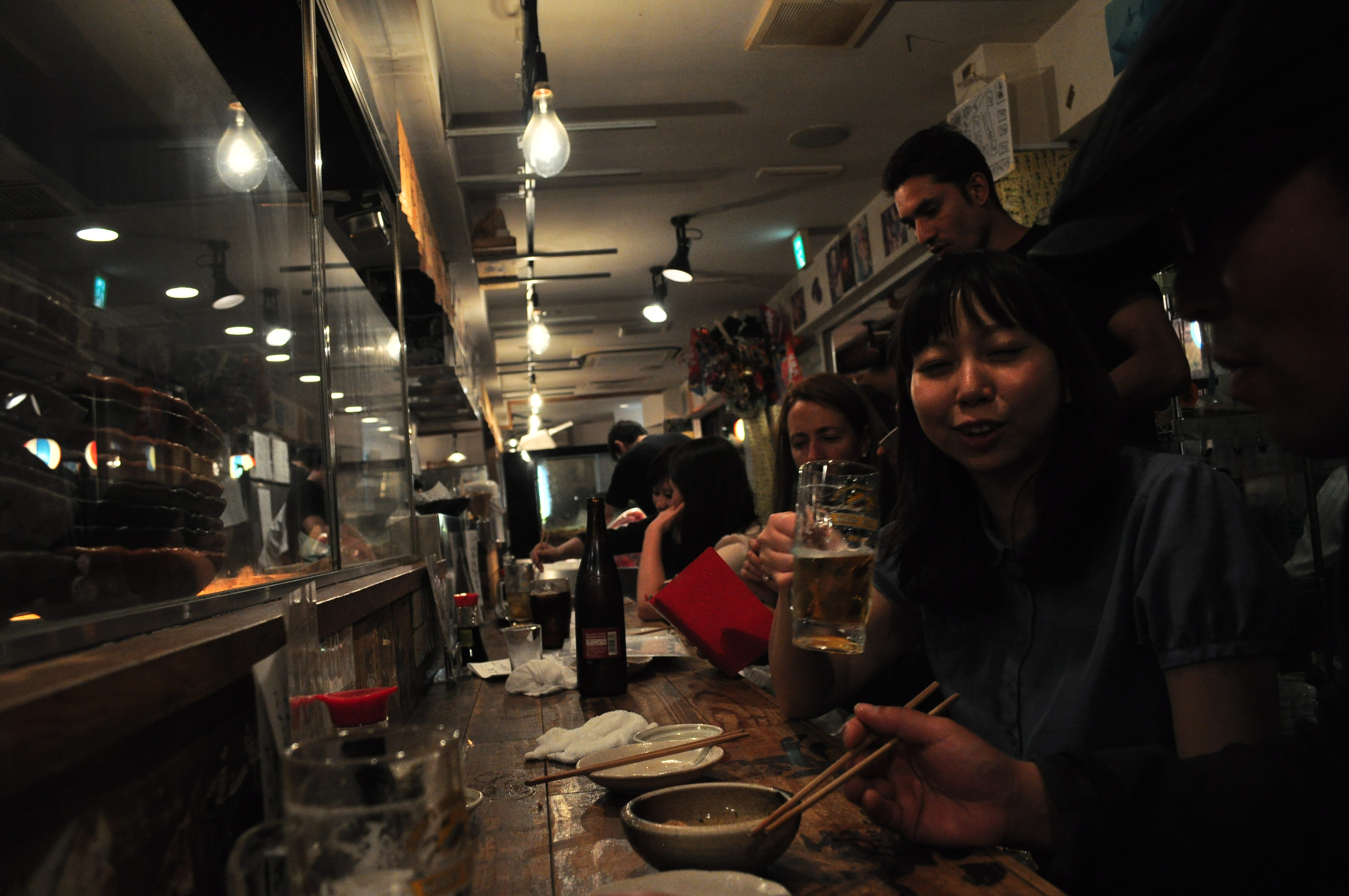
People at an izakaya, sitting by the bar and facing the kitchen

Izakaya are often likened to taverns or pubs, but there are a number of differences.

Depending on the izakaya, customers either sit on tatami mats and dine from low tables, as in the traditional Japanese style, or sit on chairs and dine from tables. Many izakaya offer a choice of both as well as seating by the bar. Some izakaya restaurants are also tachi-nomi style, literally translated as "drinking while standing".

Usually, customers are given an oshibori (wet towel) to clean their hands; the towels are cold in summer and hot in winter. Next, a tiny appetizer, called an otōshi in the Tokyo area or tsukidashi in the Osaka-Kobe area, is served. It is local custom and usually charged onto the bill in lieu of an entry fee.

The menu may be on the table, displayed on walls, or both. Picture menus are common in larger izakaya. Food and drink are ordered throughout the course of the session as desired. They are brought to the table, and the bill is added up at the end of the session. Unlike other Japanese styles of eating, food items are usually shared by everyone at the table, similar to Spanish tapas.

Common styles of izakaya dining in Japan are nomi-hōdai ("all you can drink") and tabe-hōdai ("all you can eat"). For a set price per person, customers can continue ordering as much food and/or drink as they wish, usually with a time limit of two or three hours.

Izakaya dining can be intimidating to non-Japanese because of the wide variety of menu items and the slow pace. Food is normally ordered slowly over several courses rather than all at once. The kitchen will serve the food when it is ready, rather than in the formal courses of Western restaurants. Typically, a beer is ordered when one is sitting down before perusing the menu. Quickly prepared dishes such as hiyayakko or edamame are ordered first, followed with progressively more robust flavors such as yakitori or karaage, finishing the meal with a rice or noodle dish to fill up.

== Typical menu items ==
A mock-up of an izakaya-style menu

Izakaya offer a wide variety of dishes. Items typically available are:

=== Alcoholic drinks ===
- Sake, a Japanese alcoholic beverage made by fermenting polished rice
- Beer (biiru)
- Shōchū
- Cocktails
  - Sour mix (sawā)
  - Chūhai
- Wine
- Whisky

Some establishments offer a bottle-keep service, allowing a patron to purchase an entire bottle of liquor (usually shōchū or whisky) and store the unfinished portion for a future visit.

=== Food ===
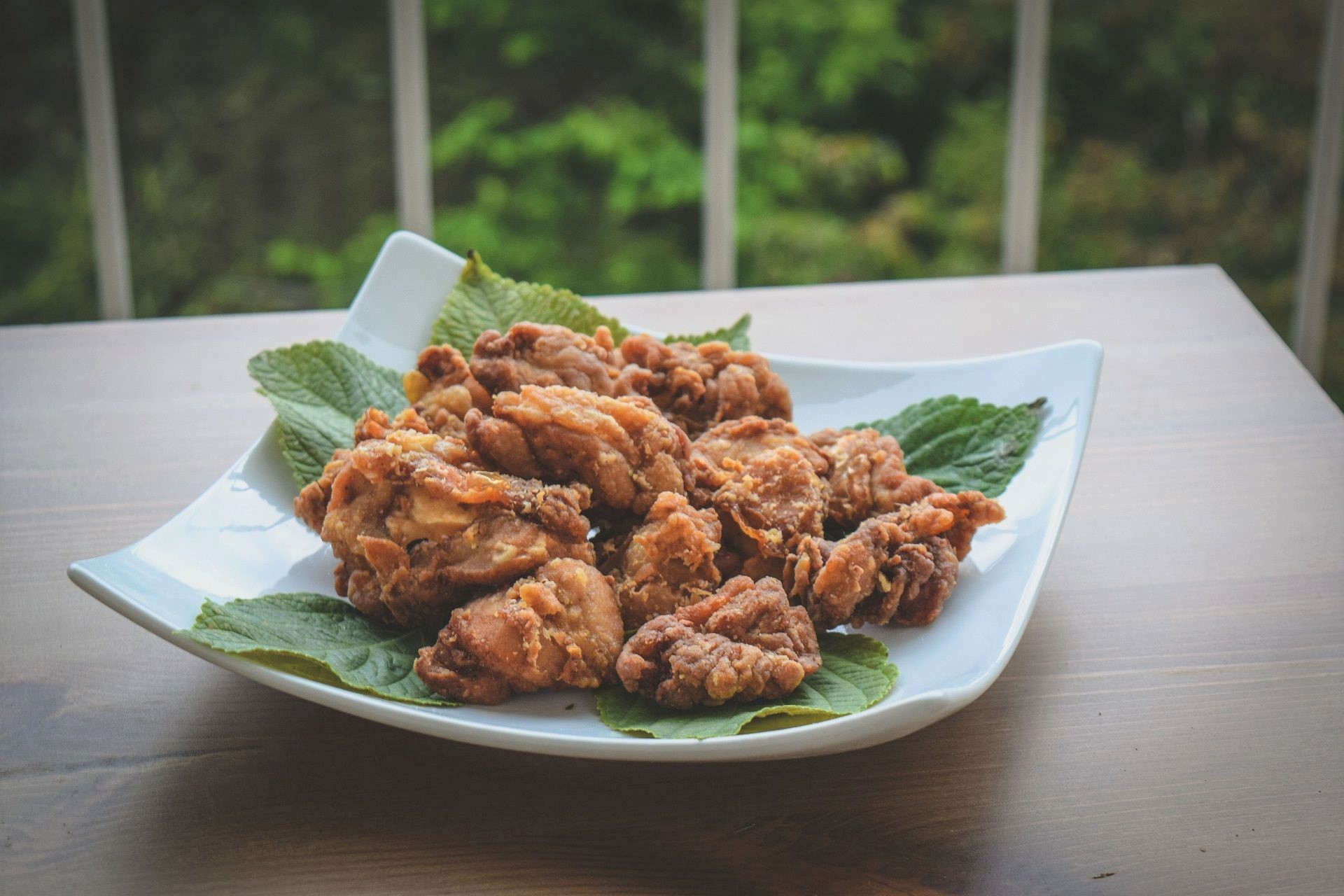
Chicken karaage

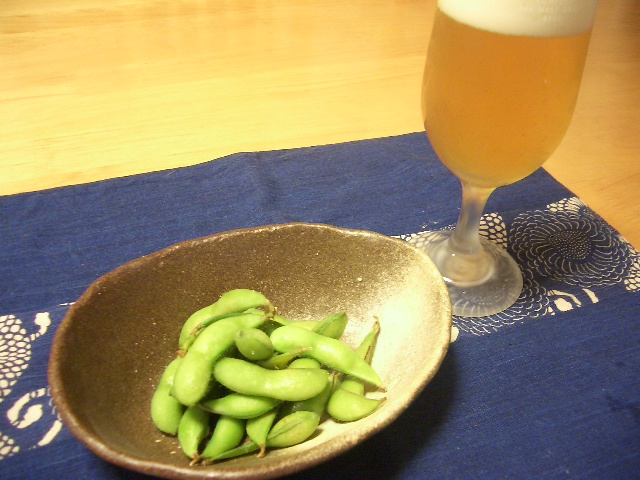
Cold edamame and a cold Japanese beer

Izakaya food is usually more substantial than tapas or mezze. Many items are designed to be shared. Menu items may include:

- Edamame – boiled and salted soybean pods
- Goma-ae – various vegetables served with a sesame dressing
- Karaage – bite-sized fried chicken
- Kushiyaki – grilled meat or vegetable skewers
- Salads
- Sashimi – slices of raw fish
- Tebasaki – chicken wings
- Tofu
  - Agedashi dōfu – deep-fried tofu in broth
  - Hiyayakko – chilled silken tofu with toppings
- Tsukemono – pickles
- Yakisoba – grilled noodles
- Yakitori – grilled chicken skewers

Rice dishes such as ochazuke and noodle dishes such as yakisoba are sometimes eaten to conclude a drinking session. For the most part, Japanese izakaya customers do not eat rice or noodles (shushoku – "staple food") at the same time as they drink alcohol, since sake, brewed from rice, traditionally takes the place of rice in a meal.

== Types ==
Izakaya were traditionally informal places where men drank sake and beer after work. However, modern izakaya customers are more likely to include independent women and students. Many izakaya today cater to a more diverse clientele by offering cocktails and wines with a sophisticated interior. Chain izakaya are often large and offer a wider selection of food and drink, allowing them to host big, sometimes rowdy, parties. Watami, Shoya, Shirokiya, Tsubohachi, and Murasaki are some of the well known chains in Japan.

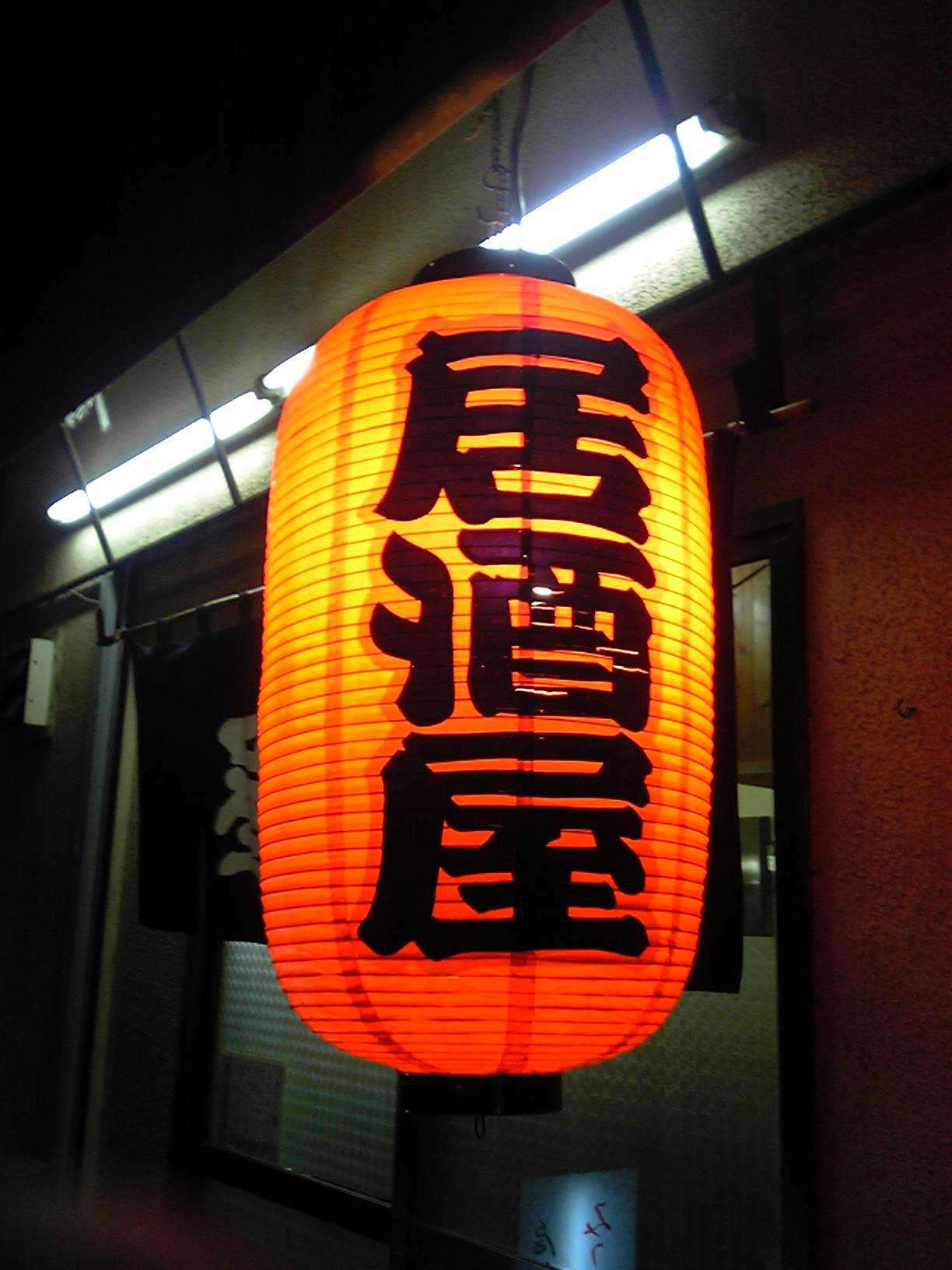
Akachōchin ("red lantern") with the kanji "Izakaya" written on it

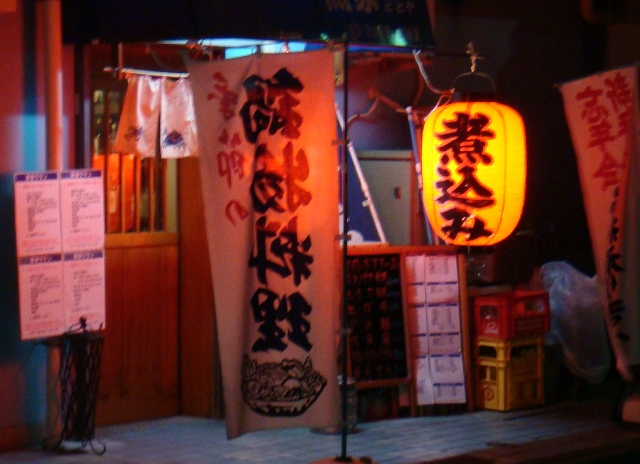
Akachōchin for nikomi (right) and nobori banner for nabe (center)

Izakaya are often called akachōchin ("red lantern"), after the red paper lanterns traditionally displayed outside. Today, the term usually refers to small, non-chain izakaya. Some unrelated businesses that are not izakaya also sometimes display red lanterns.

Cosplay izakaya became popular in the 2000s. The staff wear costumes and wait on customers. In some establishments, shows are performed. Costumes include those for butlers and maids.

Establishments specialising in oden are called oden-ya. They usually take the form of street stalls with seating and are popular in winter.

Robatayaki are places in which customers sit around an open hearth on which chefs grill seafood and vegetables. Fresh ingredients are displayed for customers to point at whenever they want to order.

Yakitori-ya specialise in yakitori, grilled chicken skewers. The chicken skewers are often grilled in front of customers.

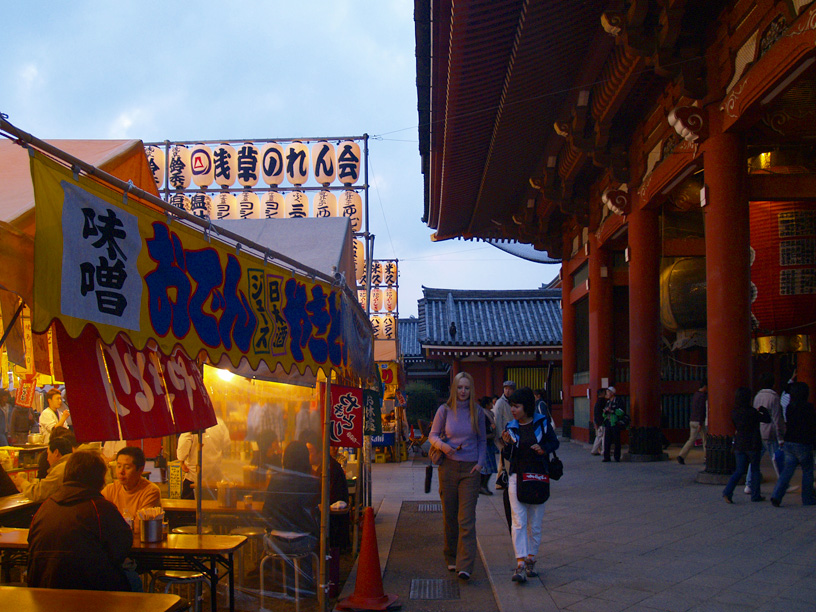
Oden street stall on the grounds of Sensō-ji in Asakusa

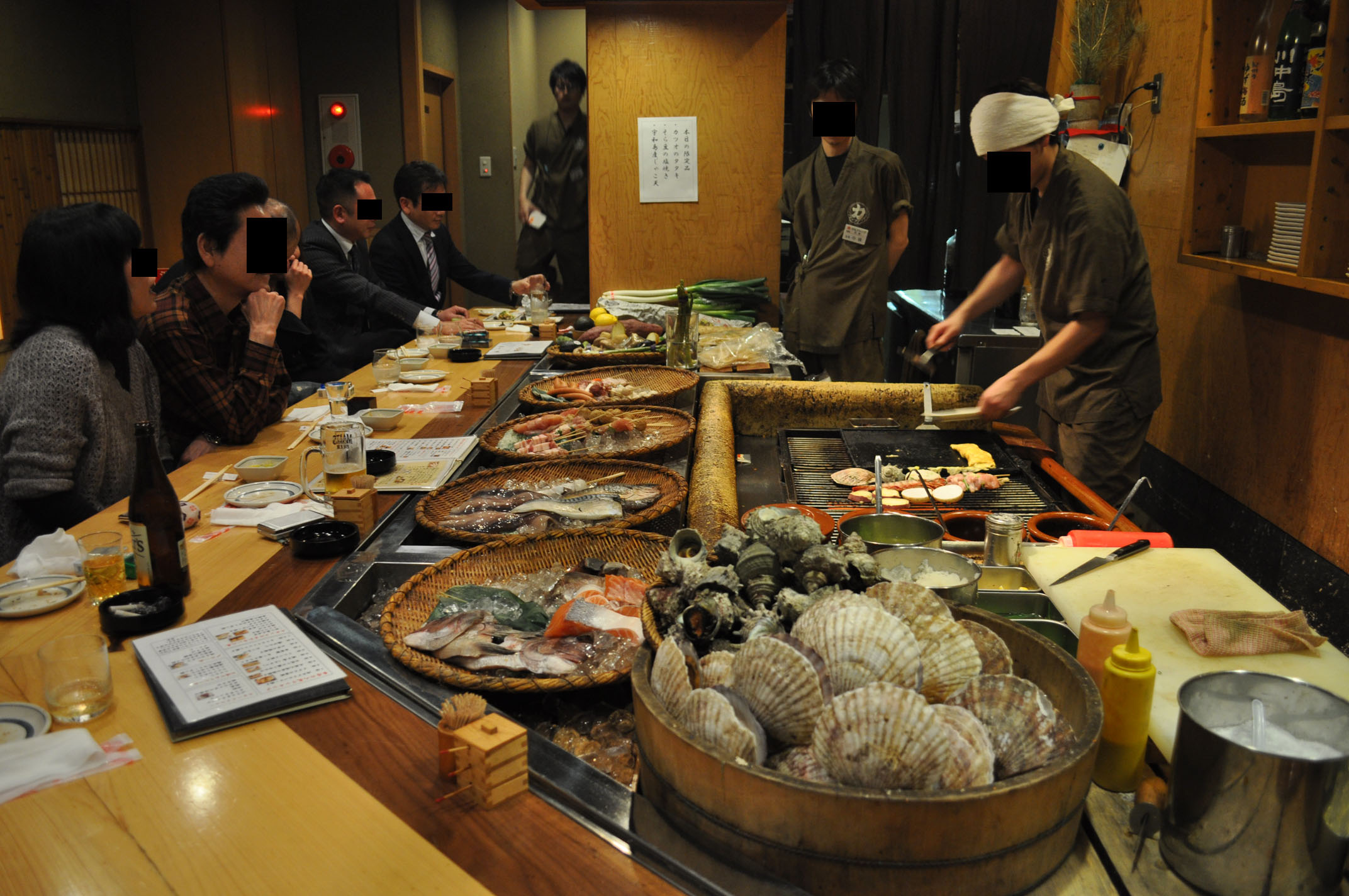
Activity at a robatayaki. Seafood and vegetables to cook displayed

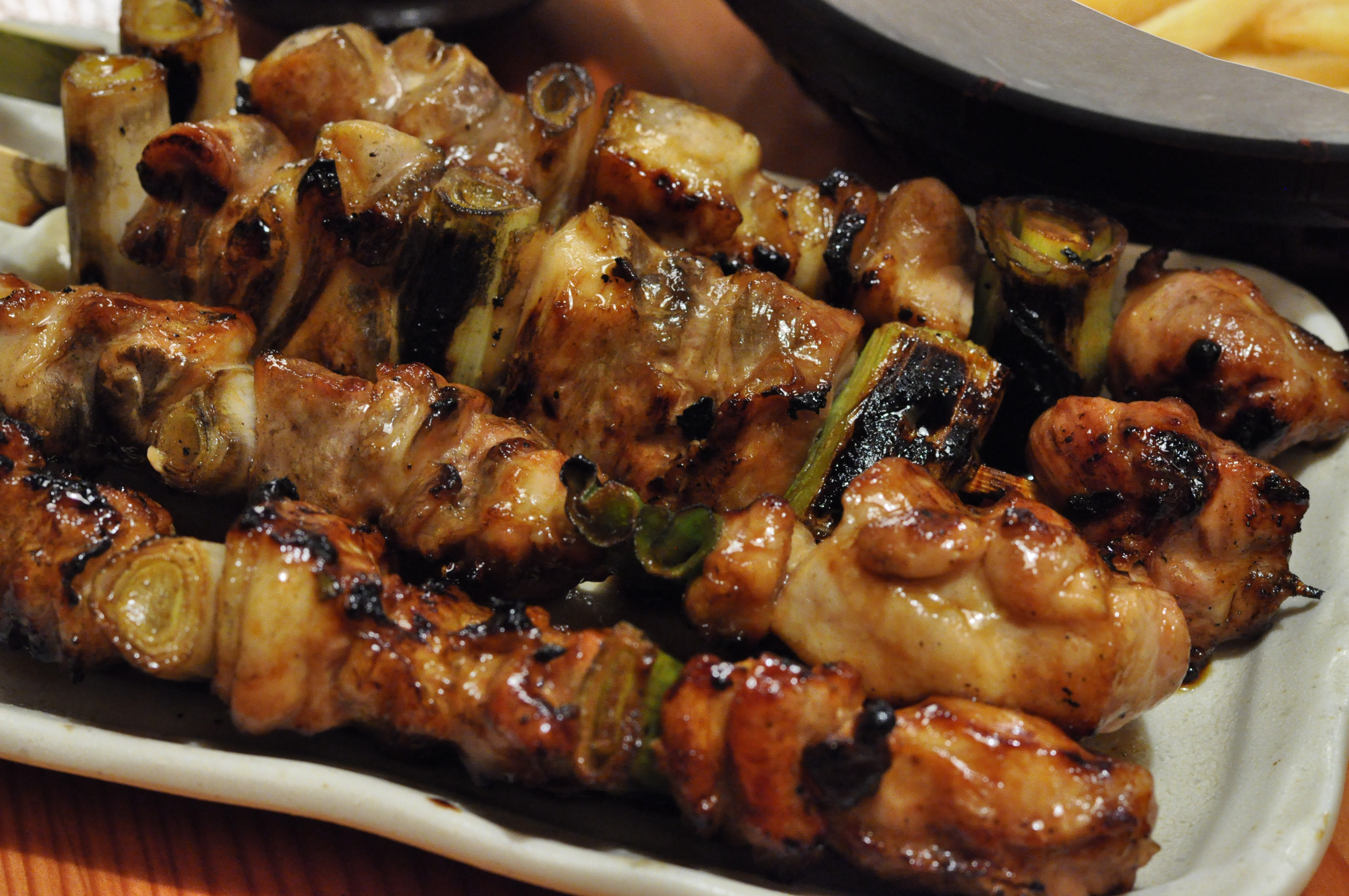
Chicken skewers (yakitori)

== See also ==
- Cuisine of Japan
- Kafana
- List of public house topics
- Ramen shop
- Sakaemachi Street and Mikuni Alley, historic drinking alleys (yokochō) in Toshima City, Japan
- Sunakku

== Bibliography ==
- Yamate, Kiichirō (20 December 1957). 桃太郎侍 (Momotarō-zamurai) (in Japanese). Vol. 16. Kawadeshobō.
- Yamaguchi Hitomi (1982). Izakaya Chōji (in Japanese). Shinchōsha.
- Ikenami, Shōtarō (2011). Onihei hankachō II (in Japanese). Vol. 5 (reprint ed.). Kōdansha.
- Nihon Eiga Eisei Kabushikigaisha; Shōchiku (2013). "Ikenami Shōtarō and Film Noir" (in Japanese). Fuji Television.
