= James Audley =

James Audley may refer to:

- James Audley (died 1369) (c. 1318–1369), Knight of the Garter
- James Audley, 2nd Baron Audley (1312/13–1386), English peer
- James Audley (died 1272) (1220–1272), English baron
