= Audley End Airfield =

- IATA: none; ICAO: none; LID: EG02

Summary
- Airport type: Public/ Unlicensed
- Operator: Lord Breybrooke
- Location: Saffron Walden
- Elevation AMSL: 282 ft / 86 m
- Coordinates: 52°00′31″N 000°13′27″E

Map
- Location in Essex

Runways
Direction	Length		Surface
Direction	ft	m	Surface
18-36		752	Grass

Audley End Airfield is located to the south west of Saffron Walden near to Saffron Walden County High School in the Uttlesford district of Essex, England. It serves general aviation aircraft and has a grass runway.

== Airfield ==
The airfield's landing strip is 752m long and the landing fee is £5.00. It is north east of London and has no facilities and a small terminal building.
