= Karintō =

Traditional Japanese snack food

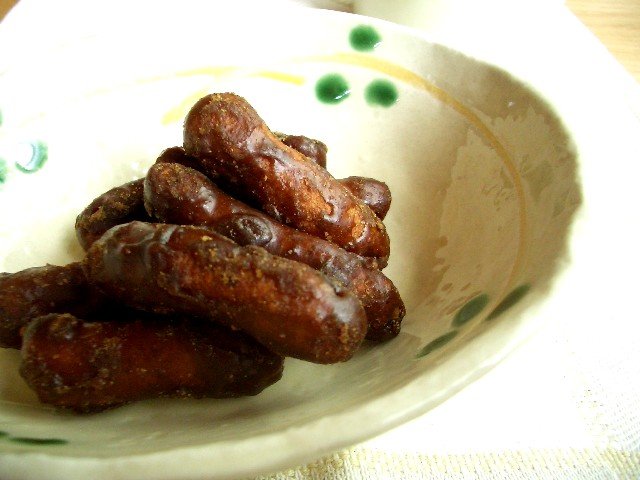
- Type: Snack food
- Place of origin: Japan
- Main ingredients: Flour, yeast, and brown sugar

Karintō (かりんとう,花林糖, karintō; (ateji)) is a traditional Japanese snack food. Sweet and deep-fried, it is made primarily of flour, yeast, and brown sugar. It has a deep brown and pitted appearance, and takes the form of a bite-sized pillow or short, sausage-like cylinder. Although traditional karintō is coated with brown sugar, other variations now appear on the market, such as white sugar, sesame seeds, miso, or peanuts.

== History ==
Karintō's roots are unclear, with primary origination theories being either from around the Nara Period or being derived from a Portuguese snack in a later period. In either case it has been available from street merchants since at least the Tenpō era, roughly from 1830 to 1841.
