= Margaret Audley =

Margaret Audley may refer to:

- Margaret Audley, 2nd Baroness Audley (died 1349), Countess of Stafford and wife of Ralph Stafford, 1st Earl of Stafford
- Margaret Audley (FitzWarin) (died 1373), wife of Fulk VIII FitzWarin, 4th Baron FitzWarin (1341–1374)
- Margaret Audley (Howard) (1540–1564), wife of Thomas Howard, 4th Duke of Norfolk
