= John Audley =

John Audley may refer to:

- John Tuchet, 6th Baron Audley (1423–1490), English peer
- John Tuchet, 8th Baron Audley (c. 1483–c. 1557), English peer
- John Awdely (fl. 1559–1577), English printer and writer
- John Audley (died 1588), 16th-century English politician, MP for West Looe and Bodmin
- John Awdeley (fl. 1593), 16th-century English politician
- John Audelay, 15th century English religious poet.
