= Side road =

Minor highway typically leading off a main road

A side road is a minor highway typically leading off a main road. A side road may be so minor as to be uncategorized with a road number.

In an urban area, a side road may be a narrow street leading off a more major street, especially in a residential area.

== Side street ==
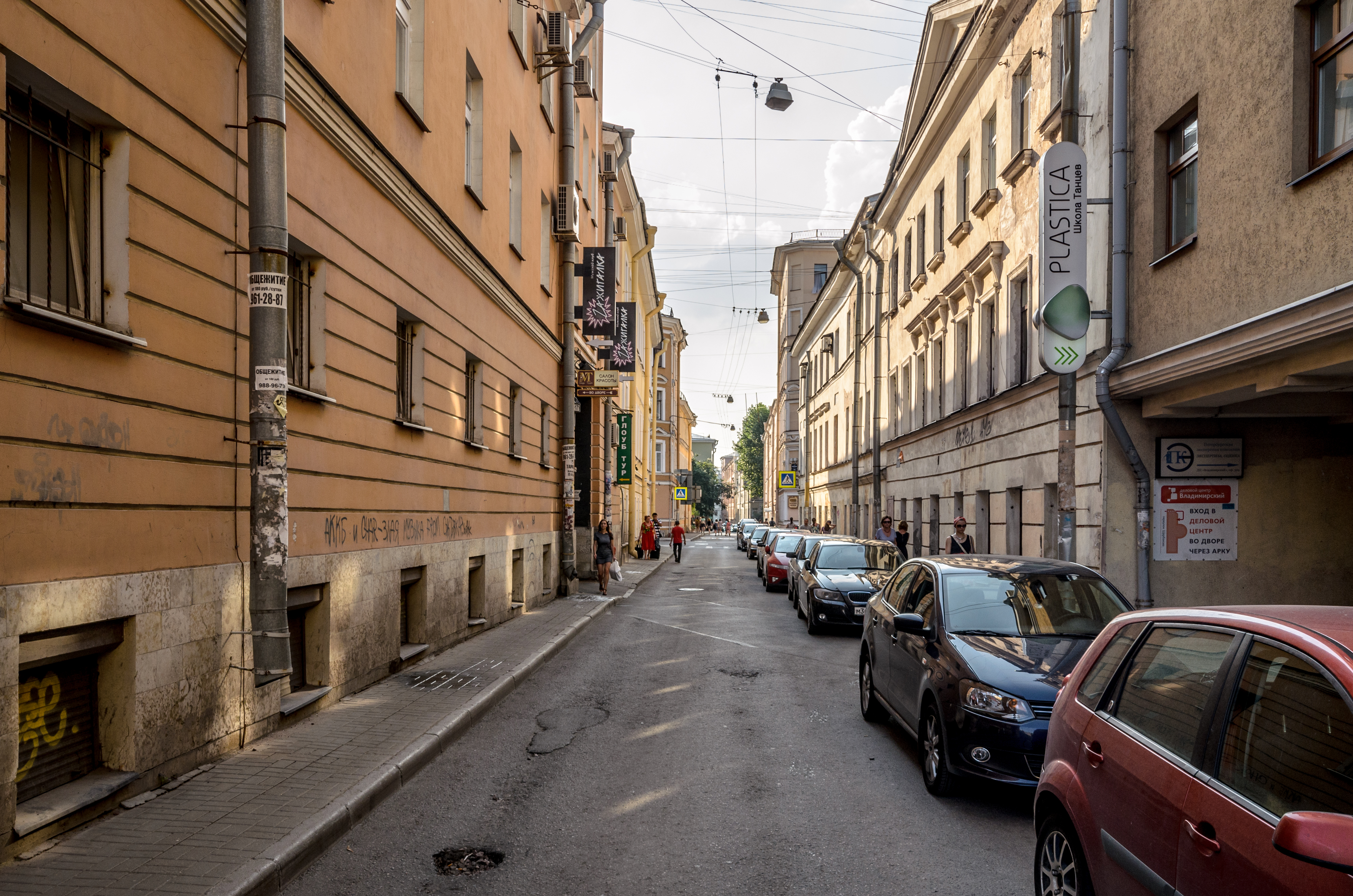
A side street in Saint Petersburg

A side street is a street that intersects a main street and ends there. It is generally of little importance to through traffic. Being the last mile of the road system, it generally carries little traffic. Common characteristics of a side street include low speed limits (usually not more than 30 mph or 50 km/h), curbside parking, and few or no painted line markings to display lanes. Intersections in urban or suburban areas are usually marked by stop signs, or occasionally yield signs in some suburban areas when intersecting other side streets. In rural areas, some intersections are uncontrolled.

Most side streets are lined with residences. Occasionally, a place of worship or a school may be located on a side street, but in a residential area, it is rare to find any commercial development (this is often prohibited by local zoning laws, unless directly adjacent to a major street).

Side streets, when built, are mostly intended only for the traffic of their residents and visitors. However, many side streets that do not dead end are also used for rat running by motorists in congested areas.

== See also ==
- B road
- Types of road
- Frontage road
