= Thynne =

Thynne is a surname. Notable people and characters with the surname include:

- Lord Alexander Thynne (1873–1918), British soldier and Conservative politician
- Andrew Joseph Thynne (1847–1927), Australian politician
- Lord Edward Thynne (1807–1884), British soldier and Conservative politician
- Francis Thynne (1544–1608), officer of arms at the College of Arms in London
- George Thynne, 2nd Baron Carteret (1770–1838), British Tory politician
- Henry Thynne, 3rd Marquess of Bath (1797–1837), British naval commander and politician
- Henry Thynne, 6th Marquess of Bath (1905–1992), British politician, aristocrat and landowner
- Lord Henry Thynne (1832–1904), British Conservative politician
- Hercules Grytpype-Thynne, character from the British 1950s comedy radio programme The Goon Show
- James Thynne (1605–1670), English landowner and politician who sat in the House of Commons in two periods between 1640 and 1670
- Jane Thynne (born 1961), British novelist, journalist and broadcaster
- Joan Thynne (1558–1612), English gentlewoman, wife of John Thynne (d. 1604)
- John Thynne (1515–1580), English steward to Edward Seymour, 1st Duke of Somerset (c. 1506 – 1552) and a member of Parliament
- John Thynne (died 1604), landowner and member of Parliament, son of the above
- John Thynne, 3rd Baron Carteret (1772–1849), British peer and politician
- John Thynne, 4th Marquess of Bath (1831–1896), British diplomat and a peer for almost sixty years
- Lady Louisa Thynne (1760–1832), British naturalist and botanical illustrator, later Louisa Finch, Countess of Aylesford
- Thomas Thynne (died 1639) (1578–1639), English landowner and member of Parliament
- Thomas Thynne (died 1669) (1610–1669), English politician who sat in the House of Commons in 1660
- Thomas Thynne, 1st Viscount Weymouth (1640–1714), English politician who served as president of the Board of Trade from 1702 to 1705
- Thomas Thynne (died 1682) (1647–1682), English landowner and politician who sat in the House of Commons from 1670 to 1682
- Thomas Thynne, 2nd Viscount Weymouth (1710–1751), English peer, descended from the first Sir John Thynne of Longleat House
- Thomas Thynne, 1st Marquess of Bath (1734–1796), British politician who held office under George III
- Thomas Thynne, 2nd Marquess of Bath (1765–1837), British peer
- Thomas Thynne, 5th Marquess of Bath (1862–1946), British landowner and Conservative politician
- Ulric Oliver Thynne (1871–1957), British champion polo player
