= Henry Thynne =

Henry Thynne may refer to:

- Henry Thynne (1675–1708), Member of Parliament for Weymouth and Melcombe Regis, and Tamworth
- Henry Thynne (librarian) (died 1705), librarian to Charles II, treasury commissioner (1684) and grandfather of Thomas Thynne, 2nd Viscount Weymouth
- Henry Carteret, 1st Baron Carteret (1735–1826), originally Henry Thynne, British politician
- Henry Thynne, 3rd Marquess of Bath (1797–1837), MP for Weobly
- Lord Henry Thynne (1832–1904), British politician, son of the above
- Henry Thynne, 6th Marquess of Bath (1905–1992), British politician, great-grandson of the third Marquess
- Sir Henry Thynne, 1st Baronet (1615–1680) of the Thynne Baronets
