= Henry Frederick Thynne =

Henry Frederick Thynne may refer to

- Henry Frederick Carteret, 1st Baron Carteret (1735–1826), previously Thynne, English member of parliament and Master of the Household to King George III
- Lord Henry Frederick Thynne (1832–1904), member of parliament and Treasurer of the Household to Queen Victoria
- Henry Frederick Thynne, 3rd Marquess of Bath (1797–1837), naval commander and landowner
- Henry Frederick Thynne, 6th Marquess of Bath (1905–1992), member of parliament and landowner

== See also ==
- Henry Frederick, Prince of Wales (1594–1612)
