= Thomas Thynne =

Thomas Thynne may refer to:

- Thomas Thynne (died 1625), English MP for Heytesbury, 1593
- Thomas Thynne (died 1639) (c. 1578–1639), English landowner and member of parliament
- Thomas Thynne (died 1669) (1610–1669), English member of parliament, son of above
- Thomas Thynne (died 1682) (1647/8–1682), English landowner and member of parliament, son of above
- Thomas Thynne, 1st Viscount Weymouth (1640–1714), English peer
- Thomas Thynne, 2nd Viscount Weymouth (1710–1751), English peer
- Thomas Thynne, 1st Marquess of Bath (1734–1796), English peer
- Thomas Thynne, 2nd Marquess of Bath (1765–1837), English peer
- Thomas Thynne, 5th Marquess of Bath (1862–1946), English peer
- Thomas Thynne, Viscount Weymouth (1796–1837), English nobleman and member of parliament
