= Charlotte Montagu-Douglas-Scott, Duchess of Buccleuch =

British peeress

Her Grace The Duchess of Buccleuch and Queensberry VA
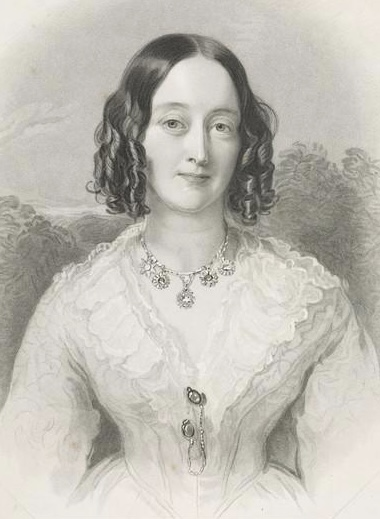

Mistress of the Robes
- In office 1841–1846
- Monarch: Victoria
- Prime Minister: Sir Robert Peel
- Preceded by: The Duchess of Sutherland
- Succeeded by: The Duchess of Sutherland

Personal details
- Born: Lady Charlotte Anne Thynne; 10 April 1811 Longleat, Wiltshire
- Died: 28 March 1895 (aged 83) Ditton Park, Buckinghamshire
- Resting place: Dalkeith Palace
- Spouse: Walter Montagu Douglas Scott, 5th Duke of Buccleuch (m. 1829; died 1884)
- Children: William Montagu Douglas Scott, 6th Duke of Buccleuch; Henry Douglas-Scott-Montagu, 1st Baron Montagu of Beaulieu; Lord Walter Montagu Douglas Scott; Lord Charles Montagu Douglas Scott; Victoria Kerr, Marchioness of Lothian; Lady Margaret Cameron; Lady Mary Trefusis
- Parents: Thomas Thynne, 2nd Marquess of Bath; The Hon. Isabella Elizabeth Byng
- Occupation: Mistress of the Robes to Queen Victoria

Charlotte Anne Montagu-Douglas-Scott, Duchess of Buccleuch and Queensberry, VA (née Thynne; 10 April 1811 – 18 March 1895) was a British peeress. A daughter of Thomas Thynne, 2nd Marquess of Bath, Charlotte married Walter Montagu Douglas Scott, 5th Duke of Buccleuch in 1829. They had seven children, including William Montagu Douglas Scott, 6th Duke of Buccleuch; Henry Douglas-Scott-Montagu, 1st Baron Montagu of Beaulieu; and the Royal Navy admiral Lord Charles Montagu Douglas Scott.

From 1841 to 1846, the Duchess of Buccleuch served as the Mistress of the Robes to Queen Victoria as a member of Robert Peel's ministry. Her husband, a staunch Conservative, also served in Peel's ministry, and the Duchess used the connection to gain patronage for her brothers. She and the Queen remained lifelong friends, with the latter serving as godmother to Charlotte's daughter Lady Victoria. The Duchess advised her on Scotland, and later converted to Roman Catholicism in 1860. She engaged in philanthropic efforts in Scotland, and died in 1895 at Ditton Park.

== Family and early life ==
Lady Charlotte Anne Thynne was born at the Thynne family seat of Longleat in Wiltshire on 10 April 1811. She was the youngest daughter and tenth child of Thomas Thynne, 2nd Marquess of Bath and the Hon. Isabella Elizabeth Byng, daughter of George Byng, 4th Viscount Torrington. Her siblings included Henry Thynne, 3rd Marquess of Bath; Elizabeth Campbell, Countess Cawdor and Louisa Lascelles, Countess of Harewood.

== Marriage ==
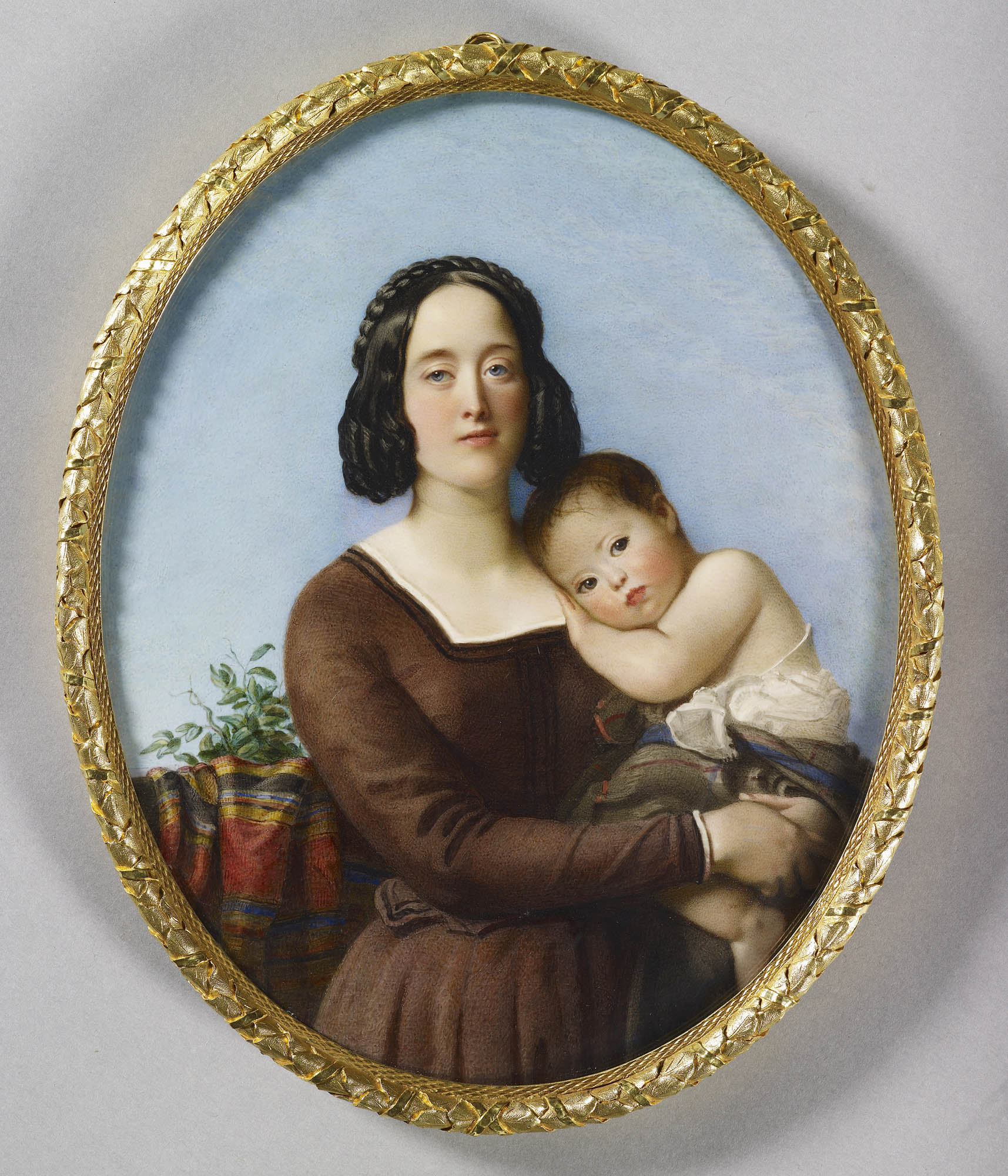
Watercolour of the Duchess with her daughter Lady Victoria by Robert Thorburn (1847)

On 13 March 1829 Charlotte married Walter Montagu Douglas Scott, 5th Duke of Buccleuch at St George's, Hanover Square, London, becoming Duchess of Buccleuch and Queensberry. He had succeeded to the dukedom at the age of thirteen upon his father's death, and was five years older than his wife. According to the contemporary journal The Lady's Realm, their "romantic" engagement resulted when the young Duke visited her father and met Lady Charlotte. Upon their parting, he saw tears in her eyes which prompted him to turn his coach around and approach her father directly to ask for her hand in marriage. The couple would produce three daughters and four sons. Among their children were William Montagu Douglas Scott, 6th Duke of Buccleuch and Henry Douglas-Scott-Montagu, 1st Baron Montagu of Beaulieu.

== Later life ==
In 1841, she succeeded the Duchess of Sutherland as Mistress of the Robes to Queen Victoria. The new prime minister, Sir Robert Peel, personally selected her to be a member of his newly formed ministry. The post would later also be filled by her daughter-in-law Louisa. Her husband was a staunch Conservative and became Lord Privy Seal in Peel's ministry from 1842 to 1846; the Duchess used the connection to help her brothers gain patronage.

The Duchess of Buccleuch and Queen Victoria were lifelong friends, with the monarch describing the Duchess as "an agreeable, sensible, clever little person." In 1842, at Buckingham Palace, during Queen Victoria's preparations to visit Scotland, the Duchess helped advise her on the country. The Duke and Duchess helped entertain the Queen and Prince Albert when they arrived at Dalkeith. The historian Alex Tyrrell writes that the Duchess helped "consolidate Conservative influence in the royal household and counteract memories of the Bedchamber Crisis." The Queen stood as godmother for the Duchess' eldest daughter Victoria Alexandrine, who was christened at Buckingham Palace in April 1845. The Montagu-Douglas-Scotts were patrons of the artist Robert Thorburn, and commissioned him to paint several portraits of the Duchess, including a double portrait of her and Lady Victoria; this was given to Queen Victoria in 1847.

The Duchess of Buccleuch resigned the post of Mistress of the Robes in 1846, and was succeeded by the Duchess of Sutherland. She was a member of the Royal Order of Victoria and Albert, Third Class.

The Duchess's high church faith was an influence of her brother Revd Lord John Thynne, who was high church canon of Westminster Abbey. She and her husband built St Mary the Virgin, an Episcopal church in Dalkeith. To the Duke's distress, she converted to Roman Catholicism in 1860, "after struggling with her conscience for many years over the distress it would cause her Presbyterian husband." Soon after being married, she befriended Cecil, Marchioness of Lothian, another prominent Roman Catholic in Scotland. The two engaged in philanthropic work in Edinburgh together, and Lady Lothian helped persuade the Duchess to come to the decision to convert. Her brother Lord Charles also converted to Catholicism.

The Duchess enjoyed gardening and landscaping, and spent much time overseeing the gardens of Drumlanrig Castle. Her husband died in April 1884, and she moved to Ditton Park in Slough, Buckinghamshire. She was much affected by the death of her son Lord Walter; The Lady's Realm wrote that the Dowager Duchess "never recovered" from this. She died at Ditton Park on 28 March 1895, and was buried at Dalkeith Palace. She supported the religious congregation Poor Servants of the Mother of God until her death, and had engaged in other fund-raising activities as well.

Family tree summary for the Thynnes of Longleat from about 1500

Ralph Botevile
Thomas Thynne	William Thynne d. 1546
John Thynne of Longleat c. 1515–1580	Francis Thynne c. 1544–1608
John Thynne of Longleat; 1555–1604	Charles Thynne c. 1568–1652
Thomas Thynne of Longleat c. 1578–1639
Baronet of Caus Castle, of Kempsford in the County of Gloucester, 1641
James of Longleat; 1605–1670	Thomas of Richmond d. 1669	Henry Frederick Thynne; 1615–1680; 1st Baronet of Kempsford
Baron Thynne, 1680; Viscount Weymouth, 1682
Thomas of Longleat, 1648–1682	Thomas Thynne; 1640–1714 inherited Longleat, 1682; 1st Viscount Weymouth and Baron Thynne, 2nd Baronet of Kempsford	James Thynne of Buckland d. 1709	Henry Thynne Frederick d. 1705
unmarried
Henry Thynne; 1675–1708	Thomas Thynne d. 1710
two daughters but no sons
Thomas Thynne; 1710–1751; 2nd Viscount Weymouth and Baron Thynne, 3rd Baronet of Kempsford
Marquess of Bath, 1789	Baron Carteret (2nd creation), 1784
Thomas Thynne; 1734–1796; 1st Marquess of Bath, 3rd Viscount Weymouth and Baron Thynne, 4th Baronet of Kempsford	Henry Carteret; 1735–1826; 1st Baron Carteret
Thomas Thynne; 1765–1837; 2nd Marquess of Bath, 4th Viscount Weymouth and Baron Thynne, 5th Baronet of Kempsford	George Thynne; 1770–1838; 2nd Baron Carteret	John Thynne; 1772–1849; 3rd Baron Carteret
Baron Carteret extinct, 1849
Henry Thynne 1797–1837; 3rd Marquess of Bath, 5th Viscount Weymouth and Baron Thynne, 6th Baronet of Kempsford	Edward Thynne; 1807–1884	Lady Charlotte Anne Thynne; 1811–1895 marr.: Walter Montagu Douglas Scott, Duke of Buccleuch and had issue.
John Thynne; 1831–1896; 4th Marquess of Bath, 6th Viscount Weymouth and Baron Thynne, 7th Baronet of Kempsford	Henry Thynne; 1832–1904
Thomas Thynne; 1862–1946; 5th Marquess of Bath, 7th Viscount Weymouth and Baron Thynne, 8th Baronet of Kempsford	Ulric Oliver Thynne; 1871–1957
Henry Thynne; 1905–1992; 6th Marquess of Bath, 8th Viscount Weymouth and Baron Thynne, 9th Baronet of Kempsford
Thomas Timothy Thynne; 1929–1930	Alexander George Thynn; 1930–2020; 7th Marquess of Bath, 9th Viscount Weymouth and Baron Thynne, 10th Baronet of Kempsford	Christopher John Thynne; 1934–2017	Valentine Charles Thynne; 1937–1979
Ceawlin Thynn b. 1974; 8th Marquess of Bath, 10th Viscount Weymouth and Baron Thynne, 11th Baronet of Kempsford	Lucien Henry Valentine Thynne b. 1965
John Alexander Ladi Thynn b. 2014 styled Viscount Weymouth

== Children ==
The Duke and Duchess of Buccleuch had a total of seven children, three daughters and four sons:

Name	Born	Died	Notes
William Henry Walter Montagu Douglas Scott, 6th Duke of Buccleuch	9 September 1831; Montagu House, Whitehall	5 November 1914; Montagu House, Whitehall	Styled as Earl of Dalkeith from 1831 to 1884; Succeeded his father has 6th Duke of Buccleuch and 8th Duke of Queensberry on 16 April 1884; Married Lady Louisa Jane Hamilton on 22 November 1859 in London and had issue; Grandfather of Princess Alice, Duchess of Gloucester, and great-great-grandfather of Sarah Ferguson.
Henry John Douglas-Scott-Montagu, 1st Baron Montagu of Beaulieu	5 November 1832; Dalkeith Palace	4 November 1905; Beaulieu Palace House	Known as Lord Henry Scott until 1885; Created Baron Montagu of Beaulieu on 29 December 1885; Married The Hon. Cecily Susan Stuart-Wortley on 1 August 1865 at Westminster Abbey and had issue.
Lord Walter Charles Montagu Douglas Scott	2 March 1834; Dalkeith	3 March 1895; Boughton House	Married Anna Maria Cradock-Hartopp on 7 October 1858 in Sutton Coldfield and had issue.
Admiral Lord Charles Thomas Montagu Douglas Scott, GCB	20 October 1839; London	21 August 1911; Boughton House	Served as Commander-in-Chief, Plymouth of the Royal Navy from 1900 to 1904; Married Ada Mary Ryan on 23 February 1883 in Sunbury, Victoria and had issue.
Lady Victoria Alexandrina Montagu Douglas Scott	20 November 1844; Dalkeith	19 June 1938; Monteviot House	Married firstly Schomberg Kerr, 9th Marquess of Lothian on 23 February 1865 in Dalkeith and had issue; Married secondly Bertram Chetwynd-Talbot on 21 February 1903 in Westminster with no issue.
Lady Margaret Elizabeth Montagu Douglas Scott	10 October 1846; Dalkeith	5 February 1918; St. Marylebone	Married Donald Cameron, 24th Lochiel on 9 December 1875 in Dalkeith and had issue.
Lady Mary Charlotte Montagu Douglas Scott	6 August 1851; Dalkeith	13 December 1908; London	Married The Hon. Walter Rodolph Trefusis on 24 July 1877 in London and had issue.

== In media ==
- The Duchess appears in Season 2 of the British TV series, Victoria (2017), played by Diana Rigg, during the period as Mistress of the Robes to Queen Victoria. Rigg was in her late 70s during filming, even though the Duchess was only in her 30s at the time.

== Ancestry ==
Ancestors of Charlotte Montagu-Douglas-Scott, Duchess of Buccleuch

8. Thomas Thynne, 2nd Viscount Weymouth
4. Thomas Thynne, 1st Marquess of Bath
9. Lady Louisa Carteret
2. Thomas Thynne, 2nd Marquess of Bath
10. William Bentinck, 2nd Duke of Portland
5. Lady Elizabeth Bentinck
11. Lady Margaret Harley
1. Charlotte Montagu Douglas Scott, Duchess of Buccleuch
12. George Byng, 3rd Viscount Torrington
6. George Byng, 4th Viscount Torrington
13. Elizabeth Daniel
3. The Hon. Isabella Elizabeth Byng
14. John Boyle, 5th Earl of Cork
7. Lady Lucy Boyle
15. Margaret Hamilton

Court offices
Preceded by The Duchess of Sutherland	Mistress of the Robes to Queen Victoria; 1841–1846	Succeeded by The Duchess of Sutherland
