= John Thynne (disambiguation) =

John Thynne may refer to:

- John Thynne (1513-1580), was the steward of Edward Seymour, 1st Duke of Somerset, and a Member of Parliament.
- John Thynne, 3rd Baron Carteret (1772–1849), English peer and politician
- John Thynne, 4th Marquess of Bath (1831-1896), Lord Lieutenant of Wiltshire and Envoy Extraordinary to Portugal and Austria
- John Thynne (died 1604), MP
- Rev. Lord John Thynne, third son of Thomas Thynne, 2nd Marquess of Bath

== See also ==
- John Thynne Howe, 2nd Baron Chedworth (1714-1762)
