= Francis Thynne =

British antiquary and officer of arms (c.1544–1608)

Francis Thynne (c. 1544 – 1608) was an English antiquary and an officer of arms at the College of Arms.

== Family background and early life ==
Francis Thynne was born in Kent, the son of William Thynne, who was Master of the Household of King Henry VIII. He attended Tonbridge School.

== Career ==
Francis Thynne was an antiquary before being admitted to the College of Arms after several fruitless applications. He was finally appointed Blanche Lyon Pursuivant of Arms Extraordinary in 1602, the first instance of this office being "extraordinary". Immediately after this appointment, he was promoted to Lancaster Herald of Arms in Ordinary.

He had an eventful life, having been imprisoned for more than two years as a debtor and crippled with gout for much of his life. He was known to have assisted William Camden in his heraldic work and was recommended by Sir William Dethick for eventual promotion to the office of Norroy King of Arms. This promotion never occurred, and Thynne died circa November 1608. His arms were those of Botfield (his family's original name) and were blazoned Barry of ten Or and Sable.

Thynne's main importance is as an antiquary who formed part of the Elizabethan Society of Antiquaries, which was active between 1586 and about 1607. They aimed to "construct a detailed and credible account of the origins and development of the English people". This club of lawyers, heralds and antiquarians largely consulted records in Latin but Thynne was remarkable for his ability to read Old English (Anglo-Saxon) sources. Archbishop Matthew Parker had initiated the searches of the libraries of dissolved monasteries, primarily to find evidence for the historical singularity of the English Church, free from Rome. However, the small circle of scholars he employed largely ceased research after his death, whilst his manuscripts disappeared into university college libraries. Apart from Henry Savile's "poorly-executed" chronicles (1598), no further Anglo-Saxon texts were published until L'Isle's Saxon Treatise (1623) and Wheelock's edition of Bede's Historiae ecclesiasticae gentis Anglorum (1644). What is remarkable about Thynne is that he and only a few other antiquaries were mastering the Anglo-Saxon language. The evidence for this comes from the published volumes of the proceedings of the Society of Antiquaries, where references are made to charters and other documents written in Old English. In a 1591 discussion on the origins of English shires, Thynne, together with James Ley and Thomas Talbot, display reasonable knowledge of Old English.

Thynne was perhaps the most scholarly of the antiquaries: "His work on Anglo-Saxon and medieval chronicles was solid and factual, based on his firm belief in the accuracy of the original manuscripts." For example, only he quotes Textus Roffensis. No one in Parker's circle had known of its existence and it did not appear in print until 1644. Thynne used it in a 1604 discourse on the office of Earl Marshal, accurately transcribing the sentence from Peace (pax), "Ðus feor sceal beon þæs cinges grið fram his burhgeate, þær he is sittende, on feower healfe his, ðæt is III mila 7 III furlang 7 III æcera bræde 7 IX fota 7 IX scæftamunda 7 IX berecorna." Thynne thought he was quoting a law of Æthelstan, not unreasonably, since it immediately follows the law-codes V and VI Æthelstan in Textus Roffensis. However, Peace is really an extension of Æthelred's Wantage Code which, given its use of what are now known to be Scandinavian loan-words, such as grið ('peace',) was probably intended for use in the Danelaw. Thynne thought this was some kind of official term, and such misunderstandings were inevitable when he was having to learn the language with almost no support and certainly no publicly available grammar or gloss. He mostly relied on Ælfric's Grammar and Glossary and his Colloquy which, intended as teaching aids for Latin, might also be used in reverse; the manuscripts of legal and religious texts available in Latin and English versions, and the few printed works to provide some Old English words or parallel texts.

If Thynne saw Textus Roffensis, then he travelled to Rochester to see it. That is another unusual aspect of his activities. He travelled to see manuscripts, not only in Rochester but also in Winchester and in various gentlemen's private libraries in and around London. For example, his various references to William of Malmesbury's Gesta Regum Anglorum suggest he viewed the collection either of John Stow (who had worked on an edition of Chaucer with Thynne's father in the 1530s) or of John, Lord Lumley.

Thynne was not wealthy. He "spent his life in libraries and his study". He failed to complete several manuscripts and the papers he read to the Society of Antiquaries contain only glimpses of his thoughts and interests. His "significance lies in the manuscripts he collected, transcribed, and translated", but his most impressive achievement was to help keep the study of Old English alive after its shaky revival by Parker's circle.

Family tree summary for the Thynnes of Longleat from about 1500

Ralph Botevile
Thomas Thynne	William Thynne d. 1546
John Thynne of Longleat c. 1515–1580	Francis Thynne c. 1544–1608
John Thynne of Longleat; 1555–1604	Charles Thynne c. 1568–1652
Thomas Thynne of Longleat c. 1578–1639
Baronet of Caus Castle, of Kempsford in the County of Gloucester, 1641
James of Longleat; 1605–1670	Thomas of Richmond d. 1669	Henry Frederick Thynne; 1615–1680; 1st Baronet of Kempsford
Baron Thynne, 1680; Viscount Weymouth, 1682
Thomas of Longleat, 1648–1682	Thomas Thynne; 1640–1714 inherited Longleat, 1682; 1st Viscount Weymouth and Baron Thynne, 2nd Baronet of Kempsford	James Thynne of Buckland d. 1709	Henry Thynne Frederick d. 1705
unmarried
Henry Thynne; 1675–1708	Thomas Thynne d. 1710
two daughters but no sons
Thomas Thynne; 1710–1751; 2nd Viscount Weymouth and Baron Thynne, 3rd Baronet of Kempsford
Marquess of Bath, 1789	Baron Carteret (2nd creation), 1784
Thomas Thynne; 1734–1796; 1st Marquess of Bath, 3rd Viscount Weymouth and Baron Thynne, 4th Baronet of Kempsford	Henry Carteret; 1735–1826; 1st Baron Carteret
Thomas Thynne; 1765–1837; 2nd Marquess of Bath, 4th Viscount Weymouth and Baron Thynne, 5th Baronet of Kempsford	George Thynne; 1770–1838; 2nd Baron Carteret	John Thynne; 1772–1849; 3rd Baron Carteret
Baron Carteret extinct, 1849
Henry Thynne 1797–1837; 3rd Marquess of Bath, 5th Viscount Weymouth and Baron Thynne, 6th Baronet of Kempsford	Edward Thynne; 1807–1884	Lady Charlotte Anne Thynne; 1811–1895 marr.: Walter Montagu Douglas Scott, Duke of Buccleuch and had issue.
John Thynne; 1831–1896; 4th Marquess of Bath, 6th Viscount Weymouth and Baron Thynne, 7th Baronet of Kempsford	Henry Thynne; 1832–1904
Thomas Thynne; 1862–1946; 5th Marquess of Bath, 7th Viscount Weymouth and Baron Thynne, 8th Baronet of Kempsford	Ulric Oliver Thynne; 1871–1957
Henry Thynne; 1905–1992; 6th Marquess of Bath, 8th Viscount Weymouth and Baron Thynne, 9th Baronet of Kempsford
Thomas Timothy Thynne; 1929–1930	Alexander George Thynn; 1930–2020; 7th Marquess of Bath, 9th Viscount Weymouth and Baron Thynne, 10th Baronet of Kempsford	Christopher John Thynne; 1934–2017	Valentine Charles Thynne; 1937–1979
Ceawlin Thynn b. 1974; 8th Marquess of Bath, 10th Viscount Weymouth and Baron Thynne, 11th Baronet of Kempsford	Lucien Henry Valentine Thynne b. 1965
John Alexander Ladi Thynn b. 2014 styled Viscount Weymouth
