= James Thynne =

English landowner and politician

Sir James Thynne (1605 – 12 October 1670) was an English landowner and politician who sat in the House of Commons in two periods between 1640 and 1670.

== Life ==
Thynne was born in 1605, the eldest son of Maria and Sir Thomas Thynne, of Longleat, Wiltshire. His parents' marriage and his legitimacy were the basis of a long legal dispute. He was knighted at Berwick on 23 June 1639.

In November 1640, Thynne was elected Member of Parliament for Wiltshire in the Long Parliament. He was disabled from sitting in 1642.

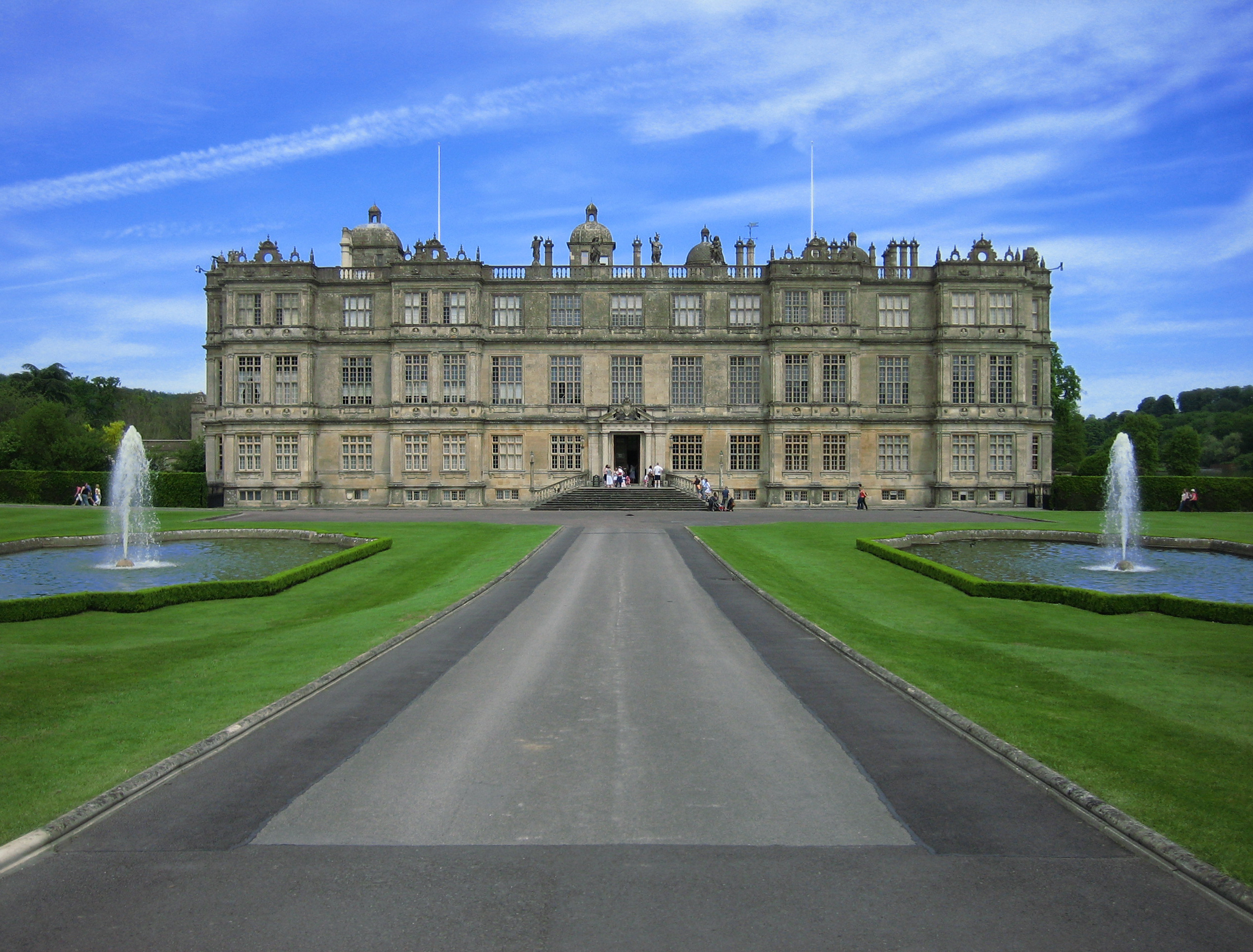
Longleat House

In 1655, Thynne founded an almshouse at Longbridge Deverill. Following the Restoration, he was High Sheriff of Wiltshire in 1661. Sir Christopher Wren advised him on improvements to the house at Longleat which included the great stairs and stone terrace. In 1664 he was re-elected MP for Wiltshire in the Cavalier Parliament and sat until his death in 1670.

Thynne married Lady Isabella Rich, daughter of Henry Rich, 1st Earl of Holland and his wife Isabel Cope. He died without issue and his nephew Thomas succeeded to the estates.

Family tree summary for the Thynnes of Longleat from about 1500

Ralph Botevile
Thomas Thynne	William Thynne d. 1546
John Thynne of Longleat c. 1515–1580	Francis Thynne c. 1544–1608
John Thynneof Longleat; 1555–1604	Charles Thynne c. 1568–1652
Thomas Thynne of Longleat c. 1578–1639
Baronet of Caus Castle, of Kempsford in the County of Gloucester, 1641
James of Longleat; 1605–1670	Thomas of Richmond d. 1669	Henry Frederick Thynne; 1615–1680; 1st Baronet of Kempsford
Baron Thynne, 1680; Viscount Weymouth, 1682
Thomas of Longleat, 1648–1682	Thomas Thynne; 1640–1714 inherited Longleat, 1682; 1st Viscount Weymouth and Baron Thynne, 2nd Baronet of Kempsford	James Thynne of Buckland d. 1709	Henry Thynne Frederick d. 1705
unmarried
Henry Thynne; 1675–1708	Thomas Thynne d. 1710
two daughters but no sons
Thomas Thynne; 1710–1751; 2nd Viscount Weymouth and Baron Thynne, 3rd Baronet of Kempsford
Marquess of Bath, 1789	Baron Carteret (2nd creation), 1784
Thomas Thynne; 1734–1796; 1st Marquess of Bath, 3rd Viscount Weymouth and Baron Thynne, 4th Baronet of Kempsford	Henry Carteret; 1735–1826; 1st Baron Carteret
Thomas Thynne; 1765–1837; 2nd Marquess of Bath, 4th Viscount Weymouth and Baron Thynne, 5th Baronet of Kempsford	George Thynne; 1770–1838; 2nd Baron Carteret	John Thynne; 1772–1849; 3rd Baron Carteret
Baron Carteret extinct, 1849
Henry Thynne 1797–1837; 3rd Marquess of Bath, 5th Viscount Weymouth and Baron Thynne, 6th Baronet of Kempsford	Edward Thynne; 1807–1884	Lady Charlotte Anne Thynne; 1811–1895 marr.: Walter Montagu Douglas Scott, Duke of Buccleuch and had issue.
John Thynne; 1831–1896; 4th Marquess of Bath, 6th Viscount Weymouth and Baron Thynne, 7th Baronet of Kempsford	Henry Thynne; 1832–1904
Thomas Thynne; 1862–1946; 5th Marquess of Bath, 7th Viscount Weymouth and Baron Thynne, 8th Baronet of Kempsford	Ulric Oliver Thynne; 1871–1957
Henry Thynne; 1905–1992; 6th Marquess of Bath, 8th Viscount Weymouth and Baron Thynne, 9th Baronet of Kempsford
Thomas Timothy Thynne; 1929–1930	Alexander George Thynn; 1930–2020; 7th Marquess of Bath, 9th Viscount Weymouth and Baron Thynne, 10th Baronet of Kempsford	Christopher John Thynne; 1934–2017	Valentine Charles Thynne; 1937–1979
Ceawlin Thynn b. 1974; 8th Marquess of Bath, 10th Viscount Weymouth and Baron Thynne, 11th Baronet of Kempsford	Lucien Henry Valentine Thynne b. 1965
John Alexander Ladi Thynn b. 2014 styled Viscount Weymouth

Parliament of England
Preceded by Philip Lord Herbert; Sir Francis Seymour	Member of Parliament for Wiltshire; 1640–1642; With: Sir Henry Ludlow	Succeeded by James Herbert; Edmund Ludlow
