= Ulric Oliver Thynne =

British soldier and polo player

Ulric Oliver Thynne CMG DSO CVO
- Born: 6 July 1871
- Died: 30 September 1957 (aged 86)
- Education: Royal Military College, Sandhurst
- Spouse(s): Marjory Wormwald (m. 1899) Elspeth Tullis (m. 1951)
- Children: 4
- Father: Henry Thynne
- Relatives: Henry Thynne (grandfather); Edward St Maur (grandfather)

Military service
- Branch/service: British Army
- Rank: Colonel
- Unit: King's Royal Rifle Corps; Imperial Yeomanry; Royal Wiltshire Yeomanry
- Battles/wars: Chitral Campaign; Second Boer War; World War I

Colonel Ulric Oliver Thynne CMG, DSO, CVO (6 July 1871 – 30 September 1957) was a distinguished British soldier and champion polo player.

== Early life ==
Thynne was born on 6 July 1871. He was the son of Rt. Hon. Lord Henry Frederick Thynne and Lady Ulrica Frederica Jane St. Maur Seymour. He was educated at Charterhouse School, Godalming, Surrey, England and at the Royal Military College, Sandhurst, Berkshire, England.

== Career ==
Thynne gained the rank of lieutenant in the service of the King's Royal Rifle Corps, and fought in the Chitral Campaign in 1895. He was appointed a lieutenant in the Royal Wiltshire Yeomanry on 10 February 1900, and fought with the Imperial Yeomanry during the Second Boer War in South Africa, where he was mentioned in despatches, and for which he was appointed a Companion of the Distinguished Service Order (DSO) in November 1900. Following the war, he was promoted to captain on 31 May 1902. He fought in the First World War, during which he was again mentioned in despatches and decorated with the award of Territorial Decoration (T.D.). He was invested as a Companion, Order of St. Michael and St. George (C.M.G.) in 1918. He was colonel commanding the Royal Wiltshire Yeomanry. and became its honorary colonel in 1938. He was invested as a Commander, Royal Victorian Order (C.V.O.) in 1946.

A keen polo player, in 1903 he won the Roehampton Trophy.

== Peerage claim ==
In 1924, Thynne claimed the ancient Barony of Beauchamp from the House of Lords; the Committee for Privileges rejected the claim, holding that the evidence was insufficient to prove that the peerage was in fact created.

== Family ==
He married, firstly, Marjory Wormald, daughter of Edward Wormald, on 16 May 1899. The children of Colonel Ulric Oliver Thynne and Marjory Wormald are:

- Lt.-Col. Oliver St. Maur Thynne (24 October 1901 – 1 May 1978), who married Mary Wroughton Morris and had issue.
- Edward Wormald Thynne (17 Mar 1905 – 8 Oct 1925)
- G/Capt. Brian Sheridan Thynne (29 Nov 1907 – 1985), who married, firstly, Naomi Waters, married, secondly, Fernanda Herrero de Aledo, and had issue from both marriages.
- Ulrica Marjory Thynne (5 May 1911 – 22 Jan 1999)

He married, secondly, Elspeth Stiven Tullis, daughter of David Tullis, on 19 December 1951. He died on 30 September 1957 at age 86.

Family tree summary for the Thynnes of Longleat from about 1500

Ralph Botevile
Thomas Thynne	William Thynne d. 1546
John Thynne of Longleat c. 1515–1580	Francis Thynne c. 1544–1608
John Thynneof Longleat; 1555–1604	Charles Thynne c. 1568–1652
Thomas Thynne of Longleat c. 1578–1639
Baronet of Caus Castle, of Kempsford in the County of Gloucester, 1641
James of Longleat; 1605–1670	Thomas of Richmond d. 1669	Henry Frederick Thynne; 1615–1680; 1st Baronet of Kempsford
Baron Thynne, 1680; Viscount Weymouth, 1682
Thomas of Longleat, 1648–1682	Thomas Thynne; 1640–1714 inherited Longleat, 1682; 1st Viscount Weymouth and Baron Thynne, 2nd Baronet of Kempsford	James Thynne of Buckland d. 1709	Henry Thynne Frederick d. 1705
unmarried
Henry Thynne; 1675–1708	Thomas Thynne d. 1710
two daughters but no sons
Thomas Thynne; 1710–1751; 2nd Viscount Weymouth and Baron Thynne, 3rd Baronet of Kempsford
Marquess of Bath, 1789	Baron Carteret (2nd creation), 1784
Thomas Thynne; 1734–1796; 1st Marquess of Bath, 3rd Viscount Weymouth and Baron Thynne, 4th Baronet of Kempsford	Henry Carteret; 1735–1826; 1st Baron Carteret
Thomas Thynne; 1765–1837; 2nd Marquess of Bath, 4th Viscount Weymouth and Baron Thynne, 5th Baronet of Kempsford	George Thynne; 1770–1838; 2nd Baron Carteret	John Thynne; 1772–1849; 3rd Baron Carteret
Baron Carteret extinct, 1849
Henry Thynne 1797–1837; 3rd Marquess of Bath, 5th Viscount Weymouth and Baron Thynne, 6th Baronet of Kempsford	Edward Thynne; 1807–1884	Lady Charlotte Anne Thynne; 1811–1895 marr.: Walter Montagu Douglas Scott, Duke of Buccleuch and had issue.
John Thynne; 1831–1896; 4th Marquess of Bath, 6th Viscount Weymouth and Baron Thynne, 7th Baronet of Kempsford	Henry Thynne; 1832–1904
Thomas Thynne; 1862–1946; 5th Marquess of Bath, 7th Viscount Weymouth and Baron Thynne, 8th Baronet of Kempsford	Ulric Oliver Thynne; 1871–1957
Henry Thynne; 1905–1992; 6th Marquess of Bath, 8th Viscount Weymouth and Baron Thynne, 9th Baronet of Kempsford
Thomas Timothy Thynne; 1929–1930	Alexander George Thynn; 1930–2020; 7th Marquess of Bath, 9th Viscount Weymouth and Baron Thynne, 10th Baronet of Kempsford	Christopher John Thynne; 1934–2017	Valentine Charles Thynne; 1937–1979
Ceawlin Thynn b. 1974; 8th Marquess of Bath, 10th Viscount Weymouth and Baron Thynne, 11th Baronet of Kempsford	Lucien Henry Valentine Thynne b. 1965
John Alexander Ladi Thynn b. 2014 styled Viscount Weymouth
