= Lord Edward Thynne =

English nobleman

Member of Parliament for Frome
- In office 1859-1865

Member of Parliament for Weobley
- In office 1831-1832

Personal details
- Born: 23 January 1807
- Died: 4 February 1884 (aged 77) Salisbury, Wiltshire, England
- Spouse(s): Elizabeth Mellish (m. 1830; died 1849) Cecilia Gore (m. 1853; died 1879) Clementina Duff (m. 1872)
- Children: 1
- Parent: Thomas Thynne (father)
- Relatives: Henry Thynne (brother); Thomas Thynne (brother); Charlotte Scott (sister); George Byng (grandfather); Thomas Thynne (grandfather); John Thynne (uncle)
- Military career
- Branch: British Army
- Rank: Lieutenant
- Units: Duke of York's rifle corps Wiltshire Yeomanry Cavalry; 18th Somerset Volunteer Rifle Corps

Lord Edward Thynne (23 January 1807 – 4 February 1884) was an English nobleman. After a short career as an army officer, he sat in the House of Commons for two periods, separated by 26 years, and opposed parliamentary reform on both occasions.

A duellist and philanderer who outlived his two wives, Thynne gambled away his own wealth and that of his first wife. In 1881, the aged Thynne was described by Vanity Fair magazine as a "hoary old reprobate".

== Early life ==
Thynne was the 8th child of Thomas Thynne, 2nd Marquess of Bath and Isabella Byng, daughter of the 4th Viscount Torrington. He was educated at Charterhouse and then matriculated in 1825 to Oriel College, Oxford. After graduating with a Bachelor of Arts degree in March 1828, he was commissioned in April 1828 as a second lieutenant in the Duke of York's rifle corps.

He retired from the British Army in June 1830 when he married Elizabeth Mellish, the heir to William Mellish a wealthy naval contractor. The novelist Emily Eden described him in a letter at that time as "totally unlike all the Thynnes I ever saw—full of fun and dashes out everything that comes into his head".

== Career ==
At the 1831 general election his father bought him a seat as Member of Parliament (MP) for the rotten borough of Weobley, alongside his brother Lord Henry Frederick Thynne. The borough was disenfranchised under the Reform Act 1832, which he and his brother had repeatedly voted against.

Despite having been given £20,000 by his father when he married in 1830 (equivalent to £2,197,000 in 2025), by 1832 Thynne's marriage and finances were in deep trouble. His wife was estranged from him, and he was repeatedly sued by his creditor Thomas Slingsby Duncombe; in response he canvassed against Dubscombe at the Finsbury by-election in 1834, and at the following year's general election.

In 1837, he fought a duel on Battersea Fields with a Mr. Passmore, over "a young lady". Each fired three shots without effect.

In 1835 his father gave him a further £60,000 to clear his debts (equivalent to £6,591,000 in 2025). However, after his father's death in 1837, his family cut him off, and by August of that year he was imprisoned for debt in the Queen's Bench Prison in Southwark. Thynne and Dunscombe resolved their quarrel in November, triggering Thynne's release from prison and allowing him to avoid bankruptcy. When Thynne was discharged from insolvency at the end of that month, the court was told that his debts were £221,059 (equivalent to £24.8 million in 2025), which The Spectator described as an "enormous sum".

After the death of Elizabeth's father, when his estate was reported at nearly £3 million (equivalent to £337 million in 2025), she unsuccessfully sued her family for more of her father's wealth (having been given £100,000 on her marriage, equivalent to £10,985,000 in 2025). Her estate was worth only £3,000 when she died in 1849.

Thynne married again in 1853, to Cecilia Gore, daughter of the novelist Catherine Gore. As a girl, Cecilia had been famous for her wasp waist. The historian Macaulay described the union in his memoirs as "the noosing of a young – or rather a defiant young flirt to an old roué".

Thynne was a skilled marksman who in 1851 shot a golden eagle with a rifle at a hundred yards range, while deer stalking in Scotland as a guest of the Earl of Malmesbury. The killing of the 8.5 pounds (3.9 kg) bird was reported to be the only instance of a flying eagle being killed with a single ball. He resumed his military career in 1855, when he was appointed as a cornet in the Wiltshire Yeomanry Cavalry. In 1863, he was commissioned as a lieutenant in the 18th Somerset Volunteer Rifle Corps

=== Return to Parliament ===
In July 1856, the Liberal MP Viscount Dungarvan succeeded to the peerage, triggering a by-election in July for his Commons seat in the borough of Frome in Somerset. Thynne was one of three candidates nominated, and a poll was demanded, but Thynne later withdrew. The seat was won by the Liberal William George Boyle, a relative of Dungarvan's.

The following year, at the 1857 general election, Thynne was nominated again, and this time did not withdraw. However, he polled poorly, coming third behind two Liberal candidates. Boyle lost the seat to fellow Liberal Donald Nicoll.

At the 1859 general election Thynne was returned to the House of Commons after a 26-year absence. Standing as an "anti-ballot conservative", he had defeated the sitting Nicoll by 194 votes to 147. A petition was lodged against the result, but subsequently withdrawn amidst a dispute about allegations that Nicoll had made improper use of Disraeli's name, a charge which Nicoll strenuously denied. Thynne did not contest the 1865 election, when Sir Henry Rawlinson regained the seat for the Liberals.

Some time in 1872, Thynne called at the London home of the 5th Marquess Townshend, and eloped to France with his wife Clementina (née Duff). Clementina, who was 16 years Townshend's junior and 40 years younger than Thynne, had been neglected by her philanthropist husband, and was described as "more than willing" to escape. Her husband had to wait 9 years for his revenge.

At the Salisbury Petty Sessions in May 1881, Thynne described how he had been accosted by Lord Townshend and two accomplices on the road between Laverstock and Salisbury. A Colonel Nepean held the pony's head while Townshend struck him several times with the handle of a horse whip. Thynne acknowledged having eloped with Lady Townshend in 1872, but noted that the Marquis had never sued for divorce, and alleged that Lord Macduff had attacked him over the same matter while he was abroad.

Townshend was convicted of the assault, and sentenced to a fine of £500 or three months in prison. After some hours in jail, he reluctantly paid the fine, equivalent to £52,600 in 2025. Townshend denounced the court, while Vanity Fair reported unnamed others as saying "the only regret is that he [Thynne] was not thrashed earlier and worse".

In January 1884, Thynne fell ill with rheumatic gout. He died on 4 February 1884, at his home Laverstock, near Salisbury. His wife Cecilia died in 1879. They had one child, a daughter: Mary Isabella Emma Thynne who died in 1906.

Family tree summary for the Thynnes of Longleat from about 1500

Ralph Botevile
Thomas Thynne	William Thynne d. 1546
John Thynne of Longleat alias Boteville c. 1515–1580	Francis Thynne c. 1544–1608
John Thynne of Longleat; 1555–1604	Charles Thynne c. 1568–1652
Thomas Thynne of Longleat c. 1578–1639
Baronet of Caus Castle, of Kempsford in the County of Gloucester, 1641
James of Longleat; 1605–1670	Thomas of Richmond d. 1669	Henry Frederick Thynne; 1615–1680; 1st Baronet of Kempsford
Baron Thynne, 1680; Viscount Weymouth, 1682
Thomas of Longleat; 1648–1682	Thomas Thynne; 1640–1714 inherited Longleat, 1682; 1st Viscount Weymouth, etc., 2nd Baronet of Kempsford	James Thynne of Buckland d. 1709	Henry Thynne Frederick d. 1705
unmarried
Henry Thynne; 1675–1708	Thomas Thynne d. 1710
two daughters but no sons
Thomas Thynne; 1710–1751; 2nd Viscount Weymouth, etc., 3rd Baronet of Kempsford
Marquess of Bath, 1789	Baron Carteret (2nd creation), 1784
Thomas Thynne; 1734–1796; 1st Marquess of Bath, 3rd Viscount Weymouth, etc., 4th Baronet of Kempsford	Henry Frederick Carteret; 1735–1826; 1st Baron Carteret
Thomas Thynne; 1765–1837; 2nd Marquess of Bath, 4th Viscount Weymouth, etc., 5th Baronet of Kempsford	George Thynne; 1770–1838; 2nd Baron Carteret	John Thynne; 1772–1849; 3rd Baron Carteret
Carteret barony extinct, 1849
Henry Frederick Thynne 1797–1837; 3rd Marquess of Bath, 5th Viscount Weymouth, etc., 6th Baronet of Kempsford	Edward Thynne; 1807–1884	Charlotte Anne Thynne; 1811–1895 marr.: Walter Montagu Douglas Scott, Duke of Buccleuch and had issue.
John Alexander Thynne; 1831–1896; 4th Marquess of Bath, 6th Viscount Weymouth, etc., 7th Baronet of Kempsford	Henry "Harry" Frederick Thynne; 1832–1904
Thomas Henry Thynne; 1862–1946; 5th Marquess of Bath, 7th Viscount Weymouth, etc., 8th Baronet of Kempsford	Ulric Oliver Thynne; 1871–1957
Henry Frederick Thynne; 1905–1992; 6th Marquess of Bath, 8th Viscount Weymouth, etc., 9th Baronet of Kempsford
Thomas Timothy Thynne; 1929–1930	Alexander George Thynn; 1930–2020; 7th Marquess of Bath, 9th Viscount Weymouth, etc., 10th Baronet of Kempsford	Christopher John Thynne; 1934–2017	Valentine Charles Thynne; 1937–1979
Ceawlin Henry Laszlo Thynn b. 1974; 8th Marquess of Bath, 10th Viscount Weymouth, etc., 11th Baronet of Kempsford	Lucien Henry Valentine Thynne b. 1965
John Alexander Ladi Thynn b. 2014 styled Viscount Weymouth
Heir apparent to the Marquess of Bath

Parliament of the United Kingdom
Preceded by Lord Henry Thynne; Lord William Thynne	Member of Parliament for Weobley; 1831 – 1832; With: Lord Henry Thynne	borough disenfranchised
Preceded by Donald Nicoll	Member of Parliament for Frome; 1859 – 1865	Succeeded by Sir Henry Rawlinson, Bt
