= Thomas Thynne (died 1639) =

English landowner and politician

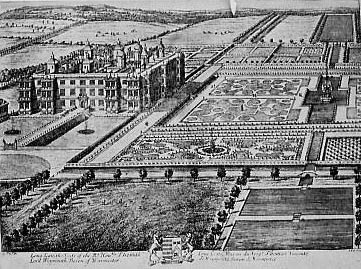
Longleat in the 17th century

Sir Thomas Thynne (c.1578–1639), of Longleat, Wiltshire, was an English landowner and politician who sat in the House of Commons at various times between 1601 and 1629. His romance with the daughter of his family's enemies may have inspired Shakespeare to pen Romeo and Juliet.

== Life ==
Thynne was the son and heir of Sir John Thynne of Longleat, a knight of the shire, and Joan Hayward, daughter of Sir Rowland Hayward, a Lord Mayor of London.

Thynne first made his mark in May 1594, at the age of sixteen, when he clandestinely married Maria (or Mary) Touchet, also sixteen, a gentlewoman at the court of Queen Elizabeth and a daughter of Lord Audley. The two were married on the day they first met and for some time kept their marriage secret because their fathers were bitterly opposed to each other, continuing a feud which had begun in the previous generation. When their story became known, Thynne's parents and Joan Thynne in particular, tried unsuccessfully to have the marriage annulled. These events are speculated to have provided the impetus the next year for Shakespeare to produce the play Romeo and Juliet, based on an earlier Italian story that begins with a similar clandestine marriage between feuding families. With Maria, Thynne had three sons, before his wife died in childbirth. Two of these sons survived childhood, James Thynne (died 1670) and Sir Thomas Thynne. Thomas's mother did not forgive him for his marriage and she took out a court case on behalf of her daughters against Thomas.

Maria's surviving correspondence between 1595 and 1611 was published by the Wiltshire Record Society in 1983 under the title Two Elizabethan Women: correspondence of Joan and Maria Thynne. After the death of Maria in 1611, Thynne married secondly Catherine Howard, a daughter of Hon. Charles Howard, son of the first Viscount Howard and niece of Lord Howard of Bindon. With her he had further sons, including Sir Henry Frederick Thynne, 1st Baronet (1615–1680), ancestor of the Marquesses of Bath.

In 1601 Thynne was elected Member of Parliament for Hindon. He was re-elected MP for Hindon in 1604. In the same year, he succeeded his father to the family estates and on his father's death, he had himself returned at a by-election for the county of Wiltshire. However, this election was disallowed by the Commons on the grounds that a sitting member was not eligible to be returned for a second constituency. Thynne was High Sheriff of Wiltshire for 1607–08. In 1621 he was elected MP for Heytesbury and was re-elected MP for Heytesbury in 1624. He was elected MP for Hindon again in 1625 and was re-elected MP for Hindon in 1626 and 1628.

Among the estates Thynne inherited was one at Kempsford in Gloucestershire, where he built a new country house, demolishing an important fortified manor house which since the 13th century had defended a crossing of the River Thames.

Thynne died on 1 August 1639.

Family tree summary for the Thynnes of Longleat from about 1500

Ralph Botevile
Thomas Thynne	William Thynne d. 1546
John Thynne of Longleat c. 1515–1580	Francis Thynne c. 1544–1608
John Thynneof Longleat; 1555–1604	Charles Thynne c. 1568–1652
Thomas Thynne of Longleat c. 1578–1639
Baronet of Caus Castle, of Kempsford in the County of Gloucester, 1641
James of Longleat; 1605–1670	Thomas of Richmond d. 1669	Henry Frederick Thynne; 1615–1680; 1st Baronet of Kempsford
Baron Thynne, 1680; Viscount Weymouth, 1682
Thomas of Longleat, 1648–1682	Thomas Thynne; 1640–1714 inherited Longleat, 1682; 1st Viscount Weymouth and Baron Thynne, 2nd Baronet of Kempsford	James Thynne of Buckland d. 1709	Henry Thynne Frederick d. 1705
unmarried
Henry Thynne; 1675–1708	Thomas Thynne d. 1710
two daughters but no sons
Thomas Thynne; 1710–1751; 2nd Viscount Weymouth and Baron Thynne, 3rd Baronet of Kempsford
Marquess of Bath, 1789	Baron Carteret (2nd creation), 1784
Thomas Thynne; 1734–1796; 1st Marquess of Bath, 3rd Viscount Weymouth and Baron Thynne, 4th Baronet of Kempsford	Henry Carteret; 1735–1826; 1st Baron Carteret
Thomas Thynne; 1765–1837; 2nd Marquess of Bath, 4th Viscount Weymouth and Baron Thynne, 5th Baronet of Kempsford	George Thynne; 1770–1838; 2nd Baron Carteret	John Thynne; 1772–1849; 3rd Baron Carteret
Baron Carteret extinct, 1849
Henry Thynne 1797–1837; 3rd Marquess of Bath, 5th Viscount Weymouth and Baron Thynne, 6th Baronet of Kempsford	Edward Thynne; 1807–1884	Lady Charlotte Anne Thynne; 1811–1895 marr.: Walter Montagu Douglas Scott, Duke of Buccleuch and had issue.
John Thynne; 1831–1896; 4th Marquess of Bath, 6th Viscount Weymouth and Baron Thynne, 7th Baronet of Kempsford	Henry Thynne; 1832–1904
Thomas Thynne; 1862–1946; 5th Marquess of Bath, 7th Viscount Weymouth and Baron Thynne, 8th Baronet of Kempsford	Ulric Oliver Thynne; 1871–1957
Henry Thynne; 1905–1992; 6th Marquess of Bath, 8th Viscount Weymouth and Baron Thynne, 9th Baronet of Kempsford
Thomas Timothy Thynne; 1929–1930	Alexander George Thynn; 1930–2020; 7th Marquess of Bath, 9th Viscount Weymouth and Baron Thynne, 10th Baronet of Kempsford	Christopher John Thynne; 1934–2017	Valentine Charles Thynne; 1937–1979
Ceawlin Thynn b. 1974; 8th Marquess of Bath, 10th Viscount Weymouth and Baron Thynne, 11th Baronet of Kempsford	Lucien Henry Valentine Thynne b. 1965
John Alexander Ladi Thynn b. 2014 styled Viscount Weymouth

== Notes ==
Parliament of England
Preceded by Francis Zouche; Abraham Hartwell	Member of Parliament for Hindon; 1601–1611; With: Sir George Paule 1601; Sir Edmund Ludlow	Succeeded by Sir Edmund Ludlow; Sir Edwin Sandys
Preceded by Sir Henry Ludlow; Walter Gowen	Member of Parliament for Heytesbury; 1621–1624; With: Sir Henry Ludlow	Succeeded by Sir Charles Berkeley; Edward Bysshe
Preceded by Lawrence Hyde; Matthew Davies	Member of Parliament for Hindon; 1625–1629; With: William Lambert 1625; Thomas Lambert 1626; Lawrence Hyde 1628–1629	Parliament suspended until 1640
