= George Thynne, 2nd Baron Carteret =

British Tory politician

The Right Honourable The Lord Carteret PC

Comptroller of the Household
- In office 1804–1812
- Monarch: George III
- Prime Minister: William Pitt the Younger; The Lord Grenville; The Duke of Portland; Spencer Perceval
- Preceded by: Lord Charles Somerset
- Succeeded by: Lord George Beresford

Personal details
- Born: 23 January 1770
- Died: 19 February 1838 (aged 68) Dalkeith Palace, Midlothian
- Party: Tory
- Spouse: Harriet Courtenay (m. 1797; died 1836)
- Parents: Thomas Thynne, 1st Marquess of Bath; Lady Elizabeth Cavendish-Bentinck
- Education: St John's College, Cambridge

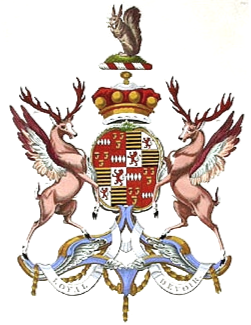
Quartered arms of Henry Carteret, 1st Baron Carteret (1735-1826)

George Thynne, 2nd Baron Carteret PC (23 January 1770 – 19 February 1838), styled Lord George Thynne between 1789 and 1826, was a British Tory politician.

== Background and education ==
Carteret was the second son of Thomas Thynne, 1st Marquess of Bath by his wife Lady Elizabeth Bentinck, a daughter of William Bentinck, 2nd Duke of Portland. In 1784 his uncle Henry Carteret, 1st Baron Carteret (born Henry Thynne) was created Baron Carteret (the second creation of that title, previously held by his own childless maternal uncle Robert Carteret, 3rd Earl Granville (1721–1776)) with special remainder to the younger sons of his elder brother, the 1st Marquess of Bath. He was educated at St John's College, Cambridge.

== Political career ==
Carteret was elected Member of Parliament for Weobly in 1790, a seat he held until 1812, and served as a Lord of the Treasury from 1801 to 1804. In 1804 he was admitted to the Privy Council and appointed Comptroller of the Household, a post he held until 1812. In 1826 he succeeded his uncle as second Baron Carteret according to the special remainder and took his seat in the House of Lords.

== Marriage ==
In 1797 Lord Carteret married the Hon. Harriet Courtenay (1772–1836), daughter of William Courtenay, 2nd Viscount Courtenay. They had no children. She died in April 1836, aged 64.

== Death and succession ==
Lord Carteret survived his wife by two years and died at Dalkeith Palace, Midlothian, in February 1838, aged 68. He was succeeded in the barony by his younger brother, John Thynne, 3rd Baron Carteret.

Family tree summary for the Thynnes of Longleat from about 1500

Ralph Botevile
Thomas Thynne	William Thynne d. 1546
John Thynne of Longleat alias Boteville c. 1515–1580	Francis Thynne c. 1544–1608
John Thynne of Longleat; 1555–1604	Charles Thynne c. 1568–1652
Thomas Thynne of Longleat c. 1578–1639
Baronet of Caus Castle, of Kempsford in the County of Gloucester, 1641
James of Longleat; 1605–1670	Thomas of Richmond d. 1669	Henry Frederick Thynne; 1615–1680; 1st Baronet of Kempsford
Baron Thynne, 1680; Viscount Weymouth, 1682
Thomas of Longleat; 1648–1682	Thomas Thynne; 1640–1714 inherited Longleat, 1682; 1st Viscount Weymouth, etc., 2nd Baronet of Kempsford	James Thynne of Buckland d. 1709	Henry Thynne Frederick d. 1705
unmarried
Henry Thynne; 1675–1708	Thomas Thynne d. 1710
two daughters but no sons
Thomas Thynne; 1710–1751; 2nd Viscount Weymouth, etc., 3rd Baronet of Kempsford
Marquess of Bath, 1789	Baron Carteret (2nd creation), 1784
Thomas Thynne; 1734–1796; 1st Marquess of Bath, 3rd Viscount Weymouth, etc., 4th Baronet of Kempsford	Henry Frederick Carteret; 1735–1826; 1st Baron Carteret
Thomas Thynne; 1765–1837; 2nd Marquess of Bath, 4th Viscount Weymouth, etc., 5th Baronet of Kempsford	George Thynne; 1770–1838; 2nd Baron Carteret	John Thynne; 1772–1849; 3rd Baron Carteret
Carteret barony extinct, 1849
Henry Frederick Thynne 1797–1837; 3rd Marquess of Bath, 5th Viscount Weymouth, etc., 6th Baronet of Kempsford	Edward Thynne; 1807–1884	Charlotte Anne Thynne; 1811–1895 marr.: Walter Montagu Douglas Scott, Duke of Buccleuch and had issue.
John Alexander Thynne; 1831–1896; 4th Marquess of Bath, 6th Viscount Weymouth, etc., 7th Baronet of Kempsford	Henry "Harry" Frederick Thynne; 1832–1904
Thomas Henry Thynne; 1862–1946; 5th Marquess of Bath, 7th Viscount Weymouth, etc., 8th Baronet of Kempsford	Ulric Oliver Thynne; 1871–1957
Henry Frederick Thynne; 1905–1992; 6th Marquess of Bath, 8th Viscount Weymouth, etc., 9th Baronet of Kempsford
Thomas Timothy Thynne; 1929–1930	Alexander George Thynn; 1930–2020; 7th Marquess of Bath, 9th Viscount Weymouth, etc., 10th Baronet of Kempsford	Christopher John Thynne; 1934–2017	Valentine Charles Thynne; 1937–1979
Ceawlin Henry Laszlo Thynn b. 1974; 8th Marquess of Bath, 10th Viscount Weymouth, etc., 11th Baronet of Kempsford	Lucien Henry Valentine Thynne b. 1965
John Alexander Ladi Thynn b. 2014 styled Viscount Weymouth
Heir apparent to the Marquess of Bath

Parliament of Great Britain
Preceded by John Scott; Viscount Weymouth	Member of Parliament for Weobly; 1790–1801; With: John Scott 1790–1796; Lord John Thynne 1796; Inigo Freeman Thomas 1796–1800; Sir Charles Talbot, Bt 1800–1801	Succeeded by Parliament of the United Kingdom
Parliament of the United Kingdom
Preceded by Parliament of Great Britain	Member of Parliament for Weobly; 1801–1812; With: Sir Charles Talbot, Bt 1801–1802; Robert Steele 1802–1807; Lord Guernsey 1807–1812; Lord Apsley 1812	Succeeded by Viscount St Asaph; William Bathurst
Political offices
Preceded by Lord Charles Somerset	Comptroller of the Household; 1804–1812	Succeeded by Lord George Beresford
Peerage of Great Britain
Preceded by Henry Frederick Carteret	Baron Carteret; 1826–1838	Succeeded by John Thynne
