= Thomas Thynne, 2nd Viscount Weymouth =

English peer

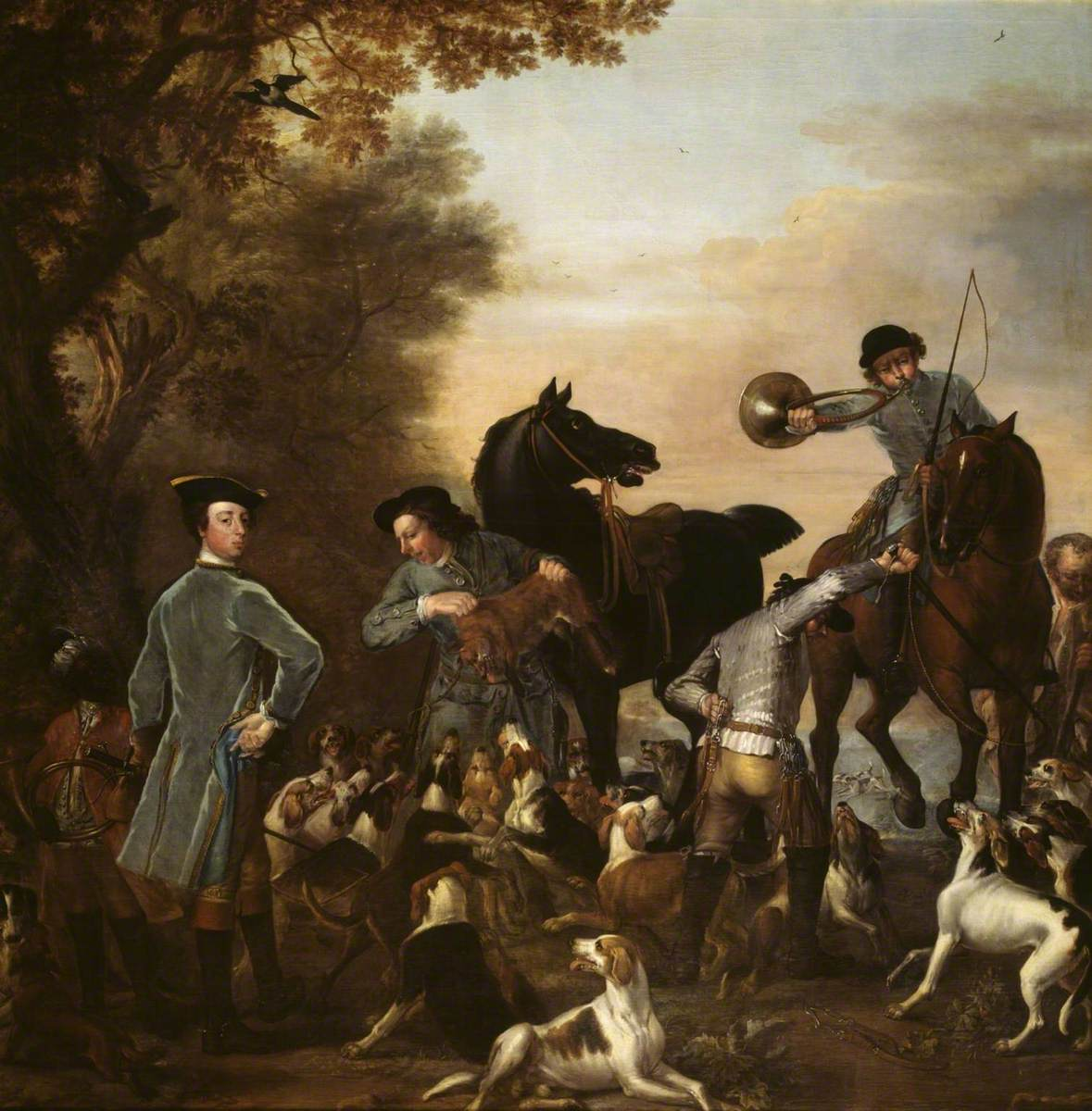
Thomas Thynne, 2nd Viscount Weymouth

Arms of Thomas Thynne, 2nd Viscount Weymouth: Barry of ten or and sable (Botteville); 2nd and 3rd: Argent, a lion rampant tail nowed and erect gules (Thynne)

Thomas Thynne, 2nd Viscount Weymouth (21 May 1710 – 1751) of Longleat House in Wiltshire was an English peer, descended from Sir John Thynne (c.1515-1580) builder of Longleat.

== Origins ==
He was born on 21 May 1710, the son of Thomas Thynne (d.1710) by his wife Lady Mary Villiers daughter of Edward Villiers, 1st Earl of Jersey. His father died a month before Thomas was born.

== Inheritance ==
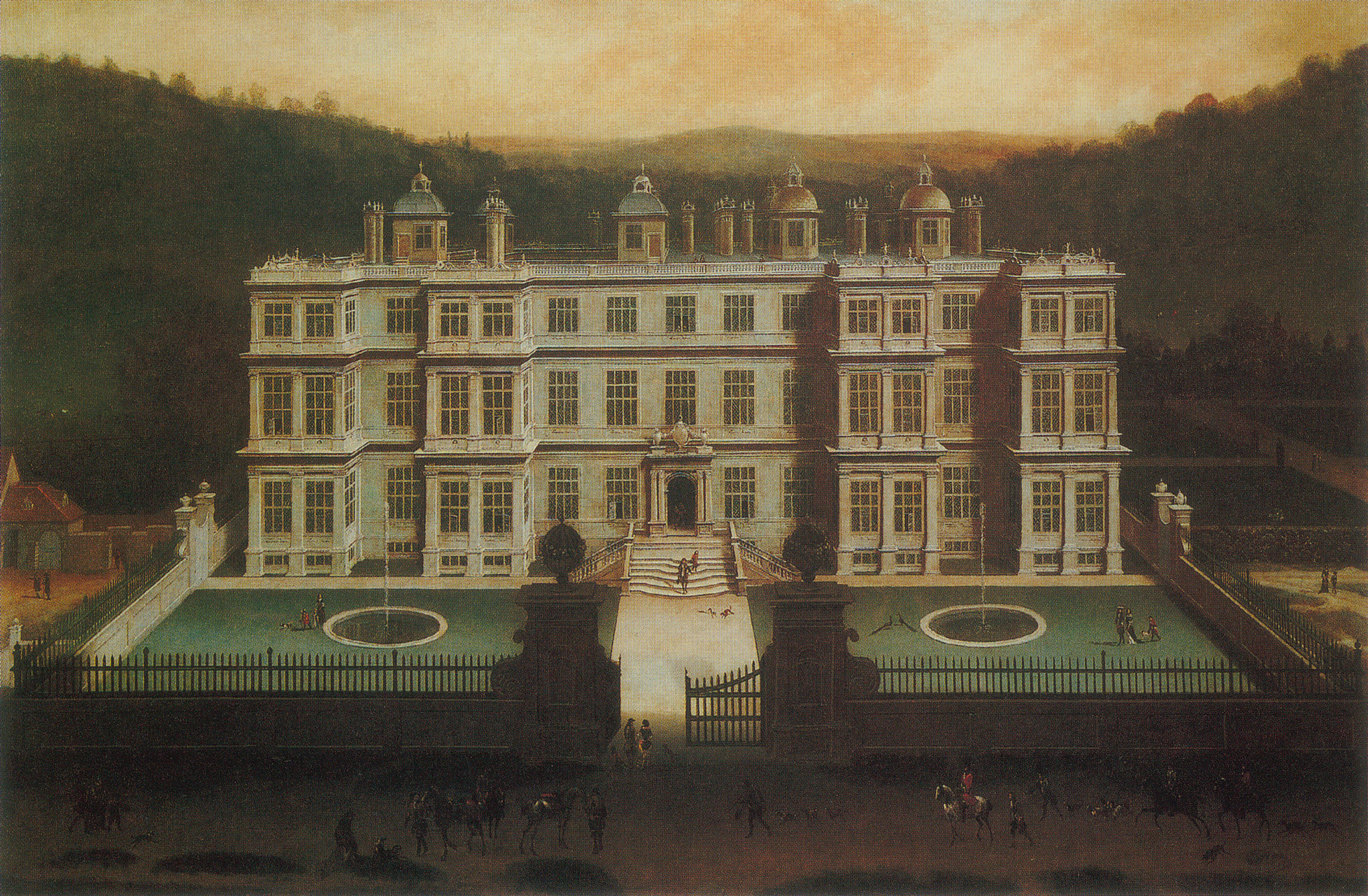
Longleat House, which he inherited aged 4; painting by Jan Siberechts, 1675

On 28 July 1714, aged four, on the death of his great uncle Thomas Thynne, 1st Viscount Weymouth, he inherited Longleat House and its great estates and succeeded to the baronetcy of Thynne, of Kempsford, Gloucestershire, and (by special remainder) to the titles of Baron Thynne of Warminster, Wiltshire, and Viscount Weymouth, of Dorset. He also inherited land at Buckland, Gloucestershire on the death of his uncle James Thynne in 1709.

== Career ==
In 1733 he was appointed High Steward of Tamworth and was also Grand Master of the Premier Grand Lodge of England from 1735 to 1736. Between 4 December 1739 and 1751, he held the royal offices of Keeper of Hyde Park, Keeper of the Mall, and Ranger of St. James's Park, all in the City of Westminster. Shortly after his Hyde Park appointment, he began the construction of the Serpentine Lakes at Longleat, apparently in imitation of Hyde Park's Serpentine.

== Marriages and children ==
He married twice:

Firstly on 6 December 1726, to Lady Elizabeth Sackville (d.1729), a daughter of Lionel Sackville, 1st Duke of Dorset.

Arms of Carteret: Gules, four fusils in fess argent

Secondly he married his third cousin, Lady Louisa Carteret (c.1712–1736), a daughter of John Carteret, 2nd Earl Granville and a co-heiress of her childless brother Robert Carteret, 3rd Earl Granville (1721–1776). On her father's side she was a great-grand-daughter of John Granville, 1st Earl of Bath (1628–1701), and her father's first-cousin was William Granville, 3rd Earl of Bath (1692–1711), on whose death the Earldom of Bath became extinct. The title of Marquess of Bath was later created for her eldest son in 1789 (see below), the title Earl of Bath being then unavailable as it had been recreated for a member of the Pulteney family. Her maternal grandmother Frances Thynne was the daughter of Thomas Thynne, 1st Viscount Weymouth.

When Lady Louisa died in childbirth, in her early twenties, her friend, Mrs Delany, wrote:"Her husband's ... loss is irreparable." During her illness, Mrs Delany had written that "my Lord Weymouth is like a madman". By Louisa Carteret he had two sons:

- Thomas Thynne, 1st Marquess of Bath (1734–1796), eldest son and heir, created Marquess of Bath in 1789. He inherited Longleat House and his father's vast estates.
- Henry Carteret, 1st Baron Carteret (1735–1826), created Baron Carteret (2nd creation) in 1784. As a second son under the system of primogeniture he had little expectation of a rich inheritance. However, in 1776, by Act of Parliament, he changed his name and arms to Carteret, in compliance with his inheritance from his childless uncle Robert Carteret, 3rd Earl Granville, 3rd Baron Carteret (1721–1776) (under the terms of the will of the latter's father John Carteret, 2nd Earl Granville, 2nd Baron Carteret (1690–1763), of his estates including Hawnes Park (now Haynes Park), in Bedfordshire and Stowe House, Kilkhampton in Cornwall (the ancient seat of the Granvilles, Earls of Bath). He also succeeded him as Bailiff of Jersey, a post (for life) long held by heads of the Carteret family. In 1784 he was created Baron Carteret, of Hawnes, thus reviving his uncle's second title.

== Death and burial ==
He died on 12 January 1750/51, at Horningsham, Wiltshire, and was buried there on 22 January.

Family tree summary for the Thynnes of Longleat from about 1500

Ralph Botevile
Thomas Thynne	William Thynne d. 1546
John Thynne of Longleat alias Boteville c. 1515–1580	Francis Thynne c. 1544–1608
John Thynne of Longleat; 1555–1604	Charles Thynne c. 1568–1652
Thomas Thynne of Longleat c. 1578–1639
Baronet of Caus Castle, of Kempsford in the County of Gloucester, 1641
James of Longleat; 1605–1670	Thomas of Richmond d. 1669	Henry Frederick Thynne; 1615–1680; 1st Baronet of Kempsford
Baron Thynne, 1680; Viscount Weymouth, 1682
Thomas of Longleat; 1648–1682	Thomas Thynne; 1640–1714 inherited Longleat, 1682; 1st Viscount Weymouth, etc., 2nd Baronet of Kempsford	James Thynne of Buckland d. 1709	Henry Thynne Frederick d. 1705
unmarried
Henry Thynne; 1675–1708	Thomas Thynne d. 1710
two daughters but no sons
Thomas Thynne; 1710–1751; 2nd Viscount Weymouth, etc., 3rd Baronet of Kempsford
Marquess of Bath, 1789	Baron Carteret (2nd creation), 1784
Thomas Thynne; 1734–1796; 1st Marquess of Bath, 3rd Viscount Weymouth, etc., 4th Baronet of Kempsford	Henry Frederick Carteret; 1735–1826; 1st Baron Carteret
Thomas Thynne; 1765–1837; 2nd Marquess of Bath, 4th Viscount Weymouth, etc., 5th Baronet of Kempsford	George Thynne; 1770–1838; 2nd Baron Carteret	John Thynne; 1772–1849; 3rd Baron Carteret
Carteret barony extinct, 1849
Henry Frederick Thynne 1797–1837; 3rd Marquess of Bath, 5th Viscount Weymouth, etc., 6th Baronet of Kempsford	Edward Thynne; 1807–1884	Charlotte Anne Thynne; 1811–1895 marr.: Walter Montagu Douglas Scott, Duke of Buccleuch and had issue.
John Alexander Thynne; 1831–1896; 4th Marquess of Bath, 6th Viscount Weymouth, etc., 7th Baronet of Kempsford	Henry "Harry" Frederick Thynne; 1832–1904
Thomas Henry Thynne; 1862–1946; 5th Marquess of Bath, 7th Viscount Weymouth, etc., 8th Baronet of Kempsford	Ulric Oliver Thynne; 1871–1957
Henry Frederick Thynne; 1905–1992; 6th Marquess of Bath, 8th Viscount Weymouth, etc., 9th Baronet of Kempsford
Thomas Timothy Thynne; 1929–1930	Alexander George Thynn; 1930–2020; 7th Marquess of Bath, 9th Viscount Weymouth, etc., 10th Baronet of Kempsford	Christopher John Thynne; 1934–2017	Valentine Charles Thynne; 1937–1979
Ceawlin Henry Laszlo Thynn b. 1974; 8th Marquess of Bath, 10th Viscount Weymouth, etc., 11th Baronet of Kempsford	Lucien Henry Valentine Thynne b. 1965
John Alexander Ladi Thynn b. 2014 styled Viscount Weymouth
Heir apparent to the Marquess of Bath

Peerage of England
Preceded by Thomas Thynne	Viscount Weymouth; 1714–1751	Succeeded by Thomas Thynne
