= Thomas Thynne (died 1682) =

English landowner and politician

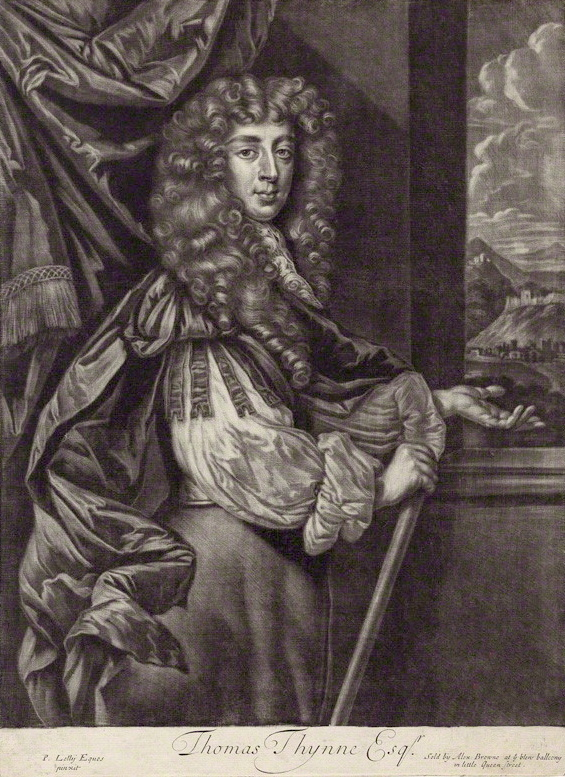
Thomas Thynne. Mezzotint by Alexander Brown, ca. 1680–84, after Sir Peter Lely

Arms of Thynne: Quarterly: 1st and 4th: Barry of ten or and sable (Boteville); 2nd and 3rd: Argent, a lion rampant with tail nowed and erected gules (Thynne)

Thomas Thynne (1647/8–12 February 1682) was an English landowner of the family that is now headed by the Marquess of Bath and politician who sat in the House of Commons from 1670 to 1682. He went by the nickname "Tom of Ten Thousand" due to his great wealth. He was a friend of the Duke of Monmouth, a relationship referred to in John Dryden's satirical work Absalom and Achitophel where Thynne is described as "Issachar, his wealthy western friend".

Thynne was the son of Sir Thomas Thynne, and his wife Stuarta Balquanquill, daughter of Dr. Walter Balquanquill. His father was a younger son of Sir Thomas Thynne of Longleat, Wiltshire. In 1670 Thynne succeeded to the family estates at Longleat on the death of his uncle Sir James Thynne without issue. He also succeeded his uncle as Member of Parliament for Wiltshire, and sat until his death in 1682.

On 15 November 1681 Thynne married the wealthy Lady Elizabeth Percy, only child of Joceline Percy, 11th Earl of Northumberland, who was then aged 14. The couple were married less than a year.

== Death ==
Thynne was murdered on 12 February 1682 after the Swedish Count Karl Johann von Königsmark began to pursue his wife. Count Karl von Königsmark was the brother of Count Philip Christoph von Königsmarck who disappeared under mysterious circumstances in the state of Hanover in Germany in 1694, possibly murdered by order of the future British monarch George I, with whose wife, Sophia Dorothea of Celle, he was having a notorious affair.

Thynne was shot while riding in his coach in Pall Mall, London, by three men, Christopher Vratz, John Stern and Charles George Borosky. It was strongly suspected that they were acting on the orders of Königsmark and the four were soon arrested, Vratz being captured by Sir John Reresby hiding at the house of a Swedish doctor in Leicester Fields (modern Leicester Square). Königsmark however was acquitted of the charge of being an accessory before the fact (due to the corruption of the jury according to diarist John Evelyn) but Vratz, Stern and Borosky were hanged on 10 March 1682.

Thynne's remains were interred in a marble tomb in Westminster Abbey. The tomb which was sculpted by Arnold Quellin, is decorated in part with a representation of the murder of Thynne in 1682. A popular ballad summed up the episode in form of a mock epitaph:

Here lies Tom Thynne of Longleat Hall
Who ne'er would have miscarried;
Had he married the woman he slept withal
Or slept with the woman he married.

After Thynne's death, his widow, Lady Elizabeth, married Charles Seymour, 6th Duke of Somerset.

Family tree summary for the Thynnes of Longleat from about 1500

Ralph Botevile
Thomas Thynne	William Thynne d. 1546
John Thynne of Longleat c. 1515–1580	Francis Thynne c. 1544–1608
John Thynneof Longleat; 1555–1604	Charles Thynne c. 1568–1652
Thomas Thynne of Longleat c. 1578–1639
Baronet of Caus Castle, of Kempsford in the County of Gloucester, 1641
James of Longleat; 1605–1670	Thomas of Richmond d. 1669	Henry Frederick Thynne; 1615–1680; 1st Baronet of Kempsford
Baron Thynne, 1680; Viscount Weymouth, 1682
Thomas of Longleat, 1648–1682	Thomas Thynne; 1640–1714 inherited Longleat, 1682; 1st Viscount Weymouth and Baron Thynne, 2nd Baronet of Kempsford	James Thynne of Buckland d. 1709	Henry Thynne Frederick d. 1705
unmarried
Henry Thynne; 1675–1708	Thomas Thynne d. 1710
two daughters but no sons
Thomas Thynne; 1710–1751; 2nd Viscount Weymouth and Baron Thynne, 3rd Baronet of Kempsford
Marquess of Bath, 1789	Baron Carteret (2nd creation), 1784
Thomas Thynne; 1734–1796; 1st Marquess of Bath, 3rd Viscount Weymouth and Baron Thynne, 4th Baronet of Kempsford	Henry Carteret; 1735–1826; 1st Baron Carteret
Thomas Thynne; 1765–1837; 2nd Marquess of Bath, 4th Viscount Weymouth and Baron Thynne, 5th Baronet of Kempsford	George Thynne; 1770–1838; 2nd Baron Carteret	John Thynne; 1772–1849; 3rd Baron Carteret
Baron Carteret extinct, 1849
Henry Thynne 1797–1837; 3rd Marquess of Bath, 5th Viscount Weymouth and Baron Thynne, 6th Baronet of Kempsford	Edward Thynne; 1807–1884	Lady Charlotte Anne Thynne; 1811–1895 marr.: Walter Montagu Douglas Scott, Duke of Buccleuch and had issue.
John Thynne; 1831–1896; 4th Marquess of Bath, 6th Viscount Weymouth and Baron Thynne, 7th Baronet of Kempsford	Henry Thynne; 1832–1904
Thomas Thynne; 1862–1946; 5th Marquess of Bath, 7th Viscount Weymouth and Baron Thynne, 8th Baronet of Kempsford	Ulric Oliver Thynne; 1871–1957
Henry Thynne; 1905–1992; 6th Marquess of Bath, 8th Viscount Weymouth and Baron Thynne, 9th Baronet of Kempsford
Thomas Timothy Thynne; 1929–1930	Alexander George Thynn; 1930–2020; 7th Marquess of Bath, 9th Viscount Weymouth and Baron Thynne, 10th Baronet of Kempsford	Christopher John Thynne; 1934–2017	Valentine Charles Thynne; 1937–1979
Ceawlin Thynn b. 1974; 8th Marquess of Bath, 10th Viscount Weymouth and Baron Thynne, 11th Baronet of Kempsford	Lucien Henry Valentine Thynne b. 1965
John Alexander Ladi Thynn b. 2014 styled Viscount Weymouth

Parliament of England
Preceded by Sir James Thynne; Henry Hyde	Member of Parliament for Wiltshire; 1670–1682; With: Henry Hyde; Sir Richard Howe, 2nd Baronet; Sir Walter St John, 3rd Baronet	Succeeded by Viscount Cornbury; Viscount Bruce
