= Henry Carteret, 1st Baron Carteret =

British politician and Baron (1735–1826)

Henry Carteret, 1st Baron Carteret PC MP Bt
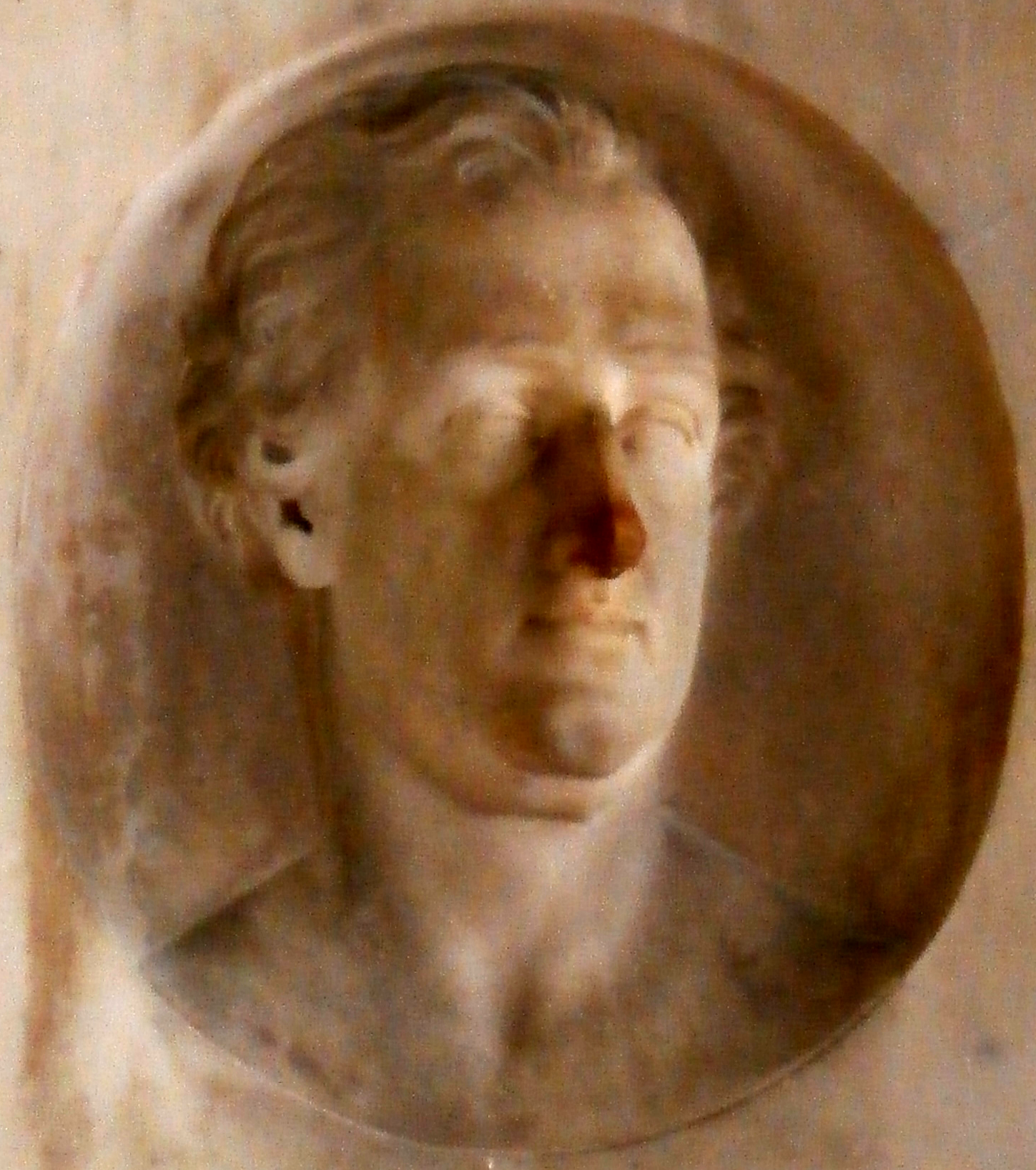
- Henry Frederick Carteret, 1st Baron Carteret (1735–1826), detail from his mural monument in Kilkhampton Church, Cornwall

Senior Privy Counsellor
- In office 1820–1826

Postmaster General of the United Kingdom
- In office 1771–1789

Master of the Household
- In office 1768–1771

Member of Parliament for Weobley
- In office 1761–1770

Member of Parliament for Staffordshire
- In office 1756–1761

Personal details
- Born: 1735
- Died: 1826 (aged 90–91)
- Spouse: Eleanor Smart
- Parents: Thomas Thynne (father); Louisa Carteret (mother)
- Relatives: Thomas Thynne (brother); John Carteret (grandfather)
- Education: St John's College, Cambridge

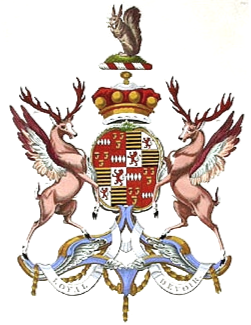
Quartered arms of Henry Carteret, 1st Baron Carteret (1735–1826): 1st & 4th grand quarters: 1st & 4th Gules, four fusils conjoined in fess argent (Carteret); 2nd & 3rd: Gules, three clarions or (Granville); 2nd & 3rd grand quarters: 1st & 4th: Barry of ten or and sable (Botteville); 2nd & 3rd: Argent, a lion rampant with tail nowed and erect gules (Thynne)

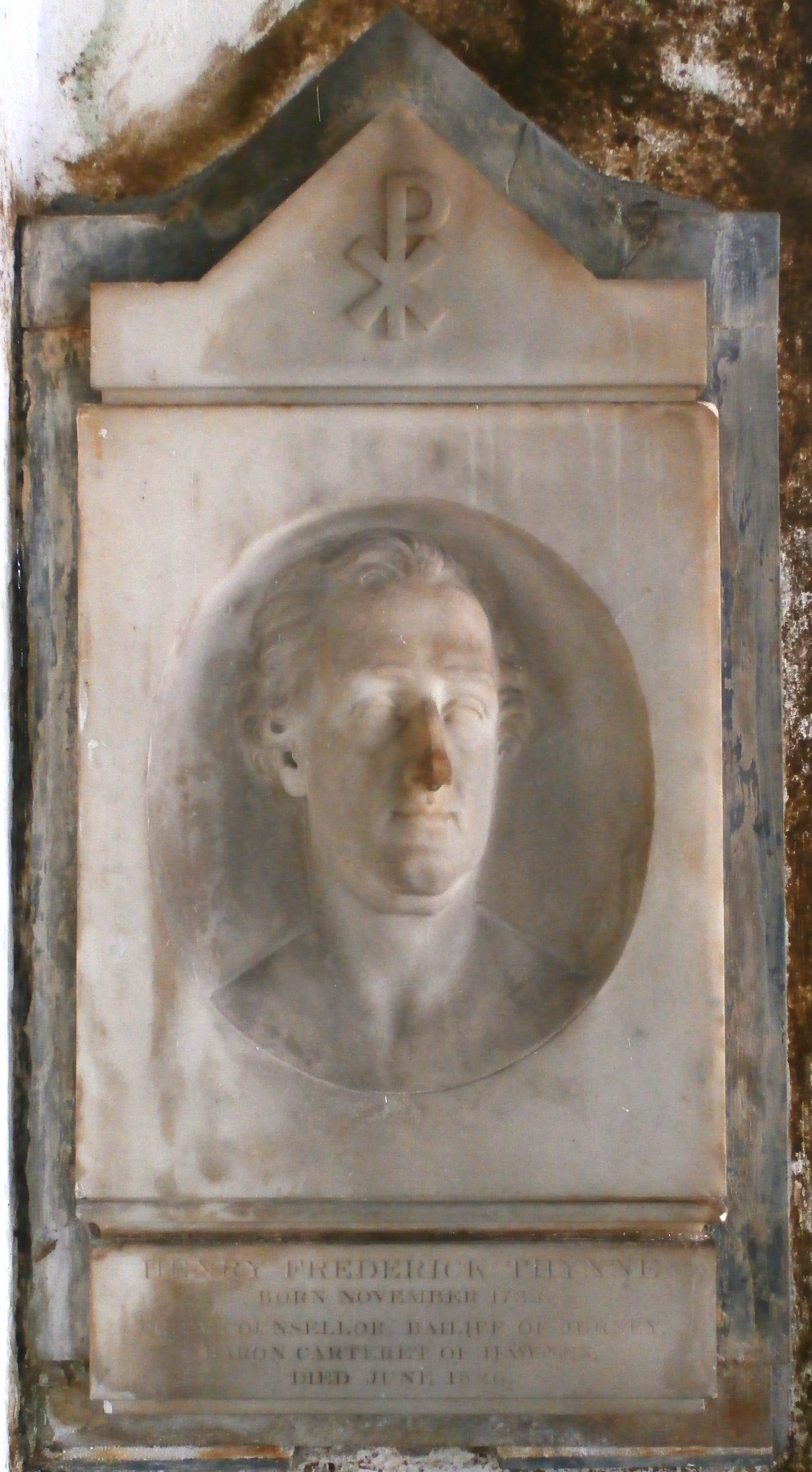
Mural monument in Kilkhampton Church, Cornwall, to Henry Carteret, 1st Baron Carteret (1735–1826), inscribed: "Henry Frederick Thynne. Born November 1735. Privy Counsellor, Bailiff of Jersey, Baron Carteret of Hawnes. Died June 1826". An identical monument survives in Haynes Church

Henry Frederick Carteret, 1st Baron Carteret PC MP (1735–1826), of Haynes, Bedfordshire (known until 1776 as the Honourable Henry Frederick Thynne), was Member of Parliament for Staffordshire (1757–1761), for Weobley in Herefordshire (1761–1770) and was Master of the Household to King George III 1768–1771. He was hereditary Bailiff of Jersey 1776–1826.

== Origins ==
He was the second son of Thomas Thynne, 2nd Viscount Weymouth (1710–1751), by his second wife Louisa Carteret, daughter of John Carteret, 2nd Baron Carteret, 2nd Earl Granville (1690–1763). He was thus the younger brother of Thomas Thynne, 3rd Viscount Weymouth, later created Marquess of Bath.

== Education ==
He was educated at St John's College, Cambridge, graduating BA, and in 1753 proceeded MA. In 1769 he was awarded the degree of Doctor of Civil Laws.

== Career ==
In 1757 he was encouraged by his friend and 3rd cousin (both were descended from daughters and eventual co-heiresses of John Granville, 1st Earl of Bath (1628–1701)) Granville Leveson-Gower, 2nd Earl Gower (1721–1803), to enter Parliament for Staffordshire, when that seat had become vacant following the death of Gower's uncle, Hon. William Leveson-Gower (died 1756). In 1761 he was elected for the Herefordshire borough of Weobley, which he represented until 1770.

In 1762 his brother sought an office for him, leading to his appointment as Clerk Comptroller of the Green Cloth (worth £1000 per year). He lost this office when the Grenville government fell in 1765, and entered into opposition. After his brother returned to office as Secretary of State in 1767, Thynne returned to the Royal household as Master of the Household, a post worth over £900 which he held until 1771.

He was made a member of the Privy Council in 1770. In 1771 (after his brother had left office), he was given the office of joint Postmaster General, which he held until 1789. This was worth £3000 per year, and he thereupon retired from the House of Commons. He gave up the postmastership in 1789, when his brother was created Marquess of Bath.

== Inheritance and peerage ==
In 1776, by Act of Parliament, he changed his name and arms to Carteret, in compliance with his inheritance from his childless uncle Robert Carteret, 3rd Baron Carteret, 3rd Earl Granville (1721–1776) (under the terms of the will of the latter's father John Carteret, 2nd Earl Granville (1690–1763)), of his estates including Hawnes Park (now Haynes Park), in Bedfordshire and Kilkhampton in Cornwall (the ancient seat of the Granvilles, Earls of Bath). He also succeeded him as Bailiff of Jersey, a post (for life) long held by heads of the Carteret family. In 1784 he was created Baron Carteret, of Hawnes, thus reviving his uncle's second title.

== Rebuilds Hawnes Park ==
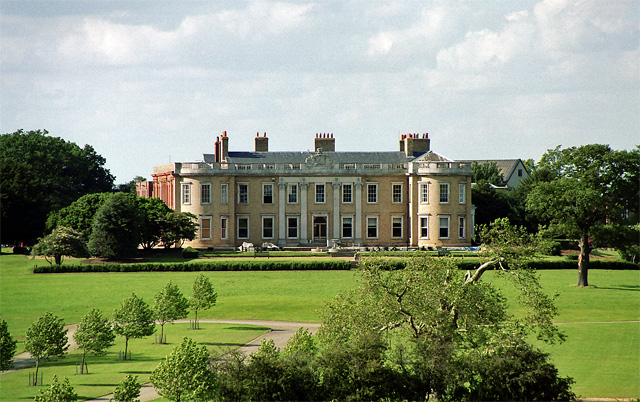
Haynes Park (formerly known as "Hawnes") in 2001. South front as rebuilt in about 1785–1790 by Henry Carteret, 1st Baron Carteret.

Hawnes Park was modernised and partly rebuilt by Henry Carteret, 1st Baron Carteret, and in 1813 consisted of two quadrangles. He rebuilt the south front in about 1785–1790, probably to the designs of James Lewis. In 1813 Lysons reported that it contained portraits of Margaret, Countess of Lennox; the mother of Rembrandt; Sir George and Lady Carteret; John, Earl Granville, and at the foot of the staircase "an ancient view" of Longleat, seat of the Thynne family.

== Marriage ==
In 1810 he married his mistress of many years, Eleanor Smart, but there were no children.

== Death and succession ==
He died in 1826 and was succeeded as 2nd Baron by his younger nephew Lord George Thynne (1770–1838) in accordance with a special remainder in the patent when he was created baron. His simple white marble mural monument with bust survives in Kilkhampton Church, Cornwall, inscribed:

"Henry Frederick Thynne. Born November 1735. Privy Counsellor, Bailiff of Jersey, Baron Carteret of Hawnes. Died June 1826"

Family tree summary for the Thynnes of Longleat from about 1500

Ralph Botevile
Thomas Thynne	William Thynne d. 1546
John Thynne of Longleat c. 1515–1580	Francis Thynne c. 1544–1608
John Thynneof Longleat; 1555–1604	Charles Thynne c. 1568–1652
Thomas Thynne of Longleat c. 1578–1639
Baronet of Caus Castle, of Kempsford in the County of Gloucester, 1641
James of Longleat; 1605–1670	Thomas of Richmond d. 1669	Henry Frederick Thynne; 1615–1680; 1st Baronet of Kempsford
Baron Thynne, 1680; Viscount Weymouth, 1682
Thomas of Longleat, 1648–1682	Thomas Thynne; 1640–1714 inherited Longleat, 1682; 1st Viscount Weymouth and Baron Thynne, 2nd Baronet of Kempsford	James Thynne of Buckland d. 1709	Henry Thynne Frederick d. 1705
unmarried
Henry Thynne; 1675–1708	Thomas Thynne d. 1710
two daughters but no sons
Thomas Thynne; 1710–1751; 2nd Viscount Weymouth and Baron Thynne, 3rd Baronet of Kempsford
Marquess of Bath, 1789	Baron Carteret (2nd creation), 1784
Thomas Thynne; 1734–1796; 1st Marquess of Bath, 3rd Viscount Weymouth and Baron Thynne, 4th Baronet of Kempsford	Henry Carteret; 1735–1826; 1st Baron Carteret
Thomas Thynne; 1765–1837; 2nd Marquess of Bath, 4th Viscount Weymouth and Baron Thynne, 5th Baronet of Kempsford	George Thynne; 1770–1838; 2nd Baron Carteret	John Thynne; 1772–1849; 3rd Baron Carteret
Baron Carteret extinct, 1849
Henry Thynne 1797–1837; 3rd Marquess of Bath, 5th Viscount Weymouth and Baron Thynne, 6th Baronet of Kempsford	Edward Thynne; 1807–1884	Lady Charlotte Anne Thynne; 1811–1895 marr.: Walter Montagu Douglas Scott, Duke of Buccleuch and had issue.
John Thynne; 1831–1896; 4th Marquess of Bath, 6th Viscount Weymouth and Baron Thynne, 7th Baronet of Kempsford	Henry Thynne; 1832–1904
Thomas Thynne; 1862–1946; 5th Marquess of Bath, 7th Viscount Weymouth and Baron Thynne, 8th Baronet of Kempsford	Ulric Oliver Thynne; 1871–1957
Henry Thynne; 1905–1992; 6th Marquess of Bath, 8th Viscount Weymouth and Baron Thynne, 9th Baronet of Kempsford
Thomas Timothy Thynne; 1929–1930	Alexander George Thynn; 1930–2020; 7th Marquess of Bath, 9th Viscount Weymouth and Baron Thynne, 10th Baronet of Kempsford	Christopher John Thynne; 1934–2017	Valentine Charles Thynne; 1937–1979
Ceawlin Thynn b. 1974; 8th Marquess of Bath, 10th Viscount Weymouth and Baron Thynne, 11th Baronet of Kempsford	Lucien Henry Valentine Thynne b. 1965
John Alexander Ladi Thynn b. 2014 styled Viscount Weymouth

Parliament of Great Britain
Preceded by Hon. William Leveson-Gower; William Bagot	Member of Parliament for Staffordshire; 1756–1761; With: William Bagot	Succeeded by Lord Grey; William Bagot
Preceded by George Venables-Vernon; John Craster	Member of Parliament for Weobley; 1761–1770; With: Marquess of Titchfield 1761–1762; William Lynch 1762–1768; The Lord Irnham 1768–1770	Succeeded by Bamber Gascoyne; The Lord Irnham
Court offices
Preceded by John Harris	Master of the Household; 1768–1771	Succeeded by Sir Francis Drake
Government offices
Preceded by The Earl of Sandwich; Unknown	Postmaster General of the United Kingdom; 1771–1789; With: The Lord le Despencer 1771–1782; The Viscount Barrington 1782; The Earl of Tankerville 1782–1783, 1784–1786; The Lord Foley 1783–1784; The Earl of Clarendon 1786; The Lord Walsingham 1787–1789	Succeeded by The Lord Walsingham; The Earl of Westmorland
Legal offices
Preceded by The Earl Granville	Bailiff of Jersey; 1776–1826	Succeeded by Thomas Le Breton
Honorary titles
Preceded by Lord Charles Spencer	Senior Privy Counsellor; 1820–1826	Succeeded by Lord Robert Spencer
Peerage of Great Britain
New creation	Baron Carteret; 1784–1826	Succeeded by George Thynne
