= John Thynne, 4th Marquess of Bath =

British diplomat (1831–1896)

The Most Honourable The Marquess of Bath
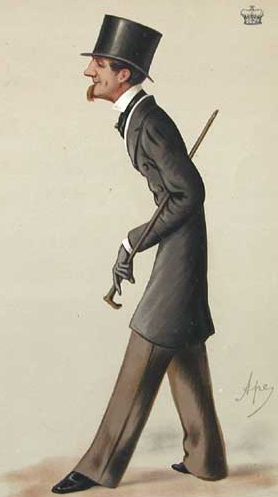
- The Marquess of Bath, by Carlo Pellegrini, 1874

Lord Lieutenant of Wiltshire
- In office 1889-1896

Chairman of Wiltshire County Council
- In office ?

Personal details
- Born: 1 March 1831 St James's, London, England
- Died: 20 April 1896 (aged 65) Italy
- Spouse: Frances Vesey (m. 1861)
- Children: 6, including Thomas and Alexander
- Parent: Henry Thynne (father)
- Relatives: Henry Thynne (brother); Alexander Baring (grandfather); Thomas Thynne (grandfather)
- Education: Christ Church, Oxford

John Alexander Thynne, 4th Marquess of Bath (1 March 1831 – 20 April 1896), styled Viscount Weymouth between March and June 1837, was a British peer and landowner, and a diplomat for almost sixty years.

== Background and education ==
Born in St James's, he was the son of Henry Thynne, 3rd Marquess of Bath and his wife Harriet, second daughter of Alexander Baring, 1st Baron Ashburton. He succeeded his father as Marquess in June 1837, aged six. Lord Bath was educated at Eton College and Christ Church, Oxford. He was a devout Anglo-Catholic and a determined opponent of the Public Worship Regulation Act 1874 which sought to suppress Ritualism in the Church of England.

He owned 55,000 acres, largely in County Monaghan, Wiltshire, Somerset and Shropshire.

== Career ==
He held the office of Envoy Extraordinary for the coronation of King Pedro V of Portugal on 27 May 1858, and Envoy Extraordinary for the coronation of the Emperor Franz Joseph I as King of Hungary on 25 July 1867.

From 1874 to 1893, he was a trustee of the National Portrait Gallery, as well as a trustee of the British Museum in 1883. He was Chairman of Wiltshire County Council and, having been a Deputy Lieutenant of Somerset from 1853, was appointed Lord Lieutenant of Wiltshire in 1889, a post he held until his death in 1896.

He served as treasurer of the Salop Infirmary in Shrewsbury in 1865.

Beriah Botfield, who tenuously claimed a family connection with the Thynnes, left to the Marquess after his death in 1863 his collections of early printed and colour plate books and paintings including Dutch landscapes, which have largely remained at Longleat House.

== Family and death ==
He married Frances Isabella Catherine Vesey, daughter of Thomas Vesey, 3rd Viscount de Vesci, on 20 August 1861. They had six children:

- Sir Thomas Henry Thynne, 5th Marquess of Bath (1862–1946)
- Lady Alice Emma Thynne (1864–1942), married 1883 Sir Michael Shaw-Stewart, 8th Baronet.
- Lady Katherine Georgina Louisa Thynne (1865–1933), married Evelyn Baring, 1st Earl of Cromer and had issue.
- Lord John Boteville Thynne (1867–1887), died young and unmarried.
- Lady Beatrice Thynne (1867–1941), died unmarried. She had been the heiress of her brother Alexander, including the manor of Church Stretton, Shropshire, which on her death passed to her nephew Henry, Viscount Weymouth.
- Lieut.-Col. Lord Alexander George Boteville Thynne (1873–14 September 1918), who was a member of parliament for Bath, commanded the 6th Battalion of the Wiltshire Regiment, was awarded the Croix de Guerre (France), was killed in action, and died unmarried.

Lord Bath died in 1896, aged 65, in Italy and was buried at Longbridge Deverill, Wiltshire. His arms were those of Botfield quartering Thynne augmented and were blazoned Quarterly 1 & 4. Barry of ten or and sable (Botfield) 2 & 3. A lion rampant tail nowed (Thynne, augmentation of honour).

Family tree summary for the Thynnes of Longleat from about 1500

Ralph Botevile
Thomas Thynne | William Thynne d. 1546
John Thynne of Longleat c. 1515–1580 | Francis Thynne c. 1544–1608
John Thynne of Longleat; 1555–1604 | Charles Thynne c. 1568–1652
Thomas Thynne of Longleat c. 1578–1639
Baronet of Caus Castle, of Kempsford in the County of Gloucester, 1641
James of Longleat; 1605–1670 | Thomas of Richmond d. 1669 | Henry Frederick Thynne; 1615–1680; 1st Baronet of Kempsford
Baron Thynne, 1680; Viscount Weymouth, 1682
Thomas of Longleat, 1648–1682 | Thomas Thynne; 1640–1714 inherited Longleat, 1682; 1st Viscount Weymouth and Baron Thynne, 2nd Baronet of Kempsford | James Thynne of Buckland d. 1709 | Henry Thynne Frederick d. 1705
unmarried
Henry Thynne; 1675–1708 | Thomas Thynne d. 1710
two daughters but no sons
Thomas Thynne; 1710–1751; 2nd Viscount Weymouth and Baron Thynne, 3rd Baronet of Kempsford
Marquess of Bath, 1789 | Baron Carteret (2nd creation), 1784
Thomas Thynne; 1734–1796; 1st Marquess of Bath, 3rd Viscount Weymouth and Baron Thynne, 4th Baronet of Kempsford | Henry Carteret; 1735–1826; 1st Baron Carteret
Thomas Thynne; 1765–1837; 2nd Marquess of Bath, 4th Viscount Weymouth and Baron Thynne, 5th Baronet of Kempsford | George Thynne; 1770–1838; 2nd Baron Carteret | John Thynne; 1772–1849; 3rd Baron Carteret
Baron Carteret extinct, 1849
Henry Thynne 1797–1837; 3rd Marquess of Bath, 5th Viscount Weymouth and Baron Thynne, 6th Baronet of Kempsford | Edward Thynne; 1807–1884 | Lady Charlotte Anne Thynne; 1811–1895 marr.: Walter Montagu Douglas Scott, Duke of Buccleuch and had issue.
John Thynne; 1831–1896; 4th Marquess of Bath, 6th Viscount Weymouth and Baron Thynne, 7th Baronet of Kempsford | Henry Thynne; 1832–1904
Thomas Thynne; 1862–1946; 5th Marquess of Bath, 7th Viscount Weymouth and Baron Thynne, 8th Baronet of Kempsford | Ulric Oliver Thynne; 1871–1957
Henry Thynne; 1905–1992; 6th Marquess of Bath, 8th Viscount Weymouth and Baron Thynne, 9th Baronet of Kempsford
Thomas Timothy Thynne; 1929–1930 | Alexander George Thynn; 1930–2020; 7th Marquess of Bath, 9th Viscount Weymouth and Baron Thynne, 10th Baronet of Kempsford | Christopher John Thynne; 1934–2017 | Valentine Charles Thynne; 1937–1979
Ceawlin Thynn b. 1974; 8th Marquess of Bath, 10th Viscount Weymouth and Baron Thynne, 11th Baronet of Kempsford | Lucien Henry Valentine Thynne b. 1965
John Alexander Ladi Thynn b. 2014 styled Viscount Weymouth

Honorary titles
| Preceded by The Earl of Radnor | Lord Lieutenant of Wiltshire; 1889–1896 | Succeeded by The Marquess of Lansdowne |
Peerage of Great Britain
| Preceded by Henry Thynne | Marquess of Bath; 1837–1896 | Succeeded by Thomas Thynne |
