= Thomas Thynne (died 1669) =

Member of the Parliament of England

Sir Thomas Thynne (c.1610 – 1669) was an English lawyer and politician who sat in the House of Commons in 1660.

== Life ==
Thynne was the second surviving son of Sir Thomas Thynne and his first wife Maria Tuchet, daughter of Lord Audley. His parents' marriage was disputed and there was a long legal dispute. Thynne matriculated at Magdalen Hall, Oxford on 28 June 1620, aged 10. He entered Middle Temple in 1629 and was called to the bar in 1637. He was knighted on 19 August 1642 but appears to have taken no part in the English Civil War; in 1646 he was assessed at £4,000 by the committee for the advance of money, but no proceedings were taken. His house at Richmond, Surrey was searched for royalist suspects in 1659 and his steward and butler were ordered to be arrested.

In 1660, Thynne was elected Member of Parliament for Hindon in a double return and was admitted to the Convention Parliament on the merits of his election. He was commissioner for assessment for Wiltshire from August 1660 to 1661, commissioner for sewers for Bedford level from 1662 to 1663, commissioner for assessment for Surrey from 1663 and commissioner for assessment for Gloucestershire from 1665.

Thynne may have died aged 59 soon after 14 October 1669, when he dictated a codicil to his will which he was unable to sign.

Thynne married Stuarta Balcanquhall, daughter of Walter Balcanquhall, DD, Dean of Durham on 6 September 1642. He was succeeded by his son Thomas. The elder Thomas pre-deceased his elder brother Sir James Thynne from whom his son Thomas inherited the vast estate at Longleat, but who was assassinated in 1682, while in his coach in Pall Mall.

Family tree summary for the Thynnes of Longleat from about 1500

Ralph Botevile
Thomas Thynne	William Thynne d. 1546
John Thynne of Longleat c. 1515–1580	Francis Thynne c. 1544–1608
John Thynneof Longleat; 1555–1604	Charles Thynne c. 1568–1652
Thomas Thynne of Longleat c. 1578–1639
Baronet of Caus Castle, of Kempsford in the County of Gloucester, 1641
James of Longleat; 1605–1670	Thomas of Richmond d. 1669	Henry Frederick Thynne; 1615–1680; 1st Baronet of Kempsford
Baron Thynne, 1680; Viscount Weymouth, 1682
Thomas of Longleat, 1648–1682	Thomas Thynne; 1640–1714 inherited Longleat, 1682; 1st Viscount Weymouth and Baron Thynne, 2nd Baronet of Kempsford	James Thynne of Buckland d. 1709	Henry Thynne Frederick d. 1705
unmarried
Henry Thynne; 1675–1708	Thomas Thynne d. 1710
two daughters but no sons
Thomas Thynne; 1710–1751; 2nd Viscount Weymouth and Baron Thynne, 3rd Baronet of Kempsford
Marquess of Bath, 1789	Baron Carteret (2nd creation), 1784
Thomas Thynne; 1734–1796; 1st Marquess of Bath, 3rd Viscount Weymouth and Baron Thynne, 4th Baronet of Kempsford	Henry Carteret; 1735–1826; 1st Baron Carteret
Thomas Thynne; 1765–1837; 2nd Marquess of Bath, 4th Viscount Weymouth and Baron Thynne, 5th Baronet of Kempsford	George Thynne; 1770–1838; 2nd Baron Carteret	John Thynne; 1772–1849; 3rd Baron Carteret
Baron Carteret extinct, 1849
Henry Thynne 1797–1837; 3rd Marquess of Bath, 5th Viscount Weymouth and Baron Thynne, 6th Baronet of Kempsford	Edward Thynne; 1807–1884	Lady Charlotte Anne Thynne; 1811–1895 marr.: Walter Montagu Douglas Scott, Duke of Buccleuch and had issue.
John Thynne; 1831–1896; 4th Marquess of Bath, 6th Viscount Weymouth and Baron Thynne, 7th Baronet of Kempsford	Henry Thynne; 1832–1904
Thomas Thynne; 1862–1946; 5th Marquess of Bath, 7th Viscount Weymouth and Baron Thynne, 8th Baronet of Kempsford	Ulric Oliver Thynne; 1871–1957
Henry Thynne; 1905–1992; 6th Marquess of Bath, 8th Viscount Weymouth and Baron Thynne, 9th Baronet of Kempsford
Thomas Timothy Thynne; 1929–1930	Alexander George Thynn; 1930–2020; 7th Marquess of Bath, 9th Viscount Weymouth and Baron Thynne, 10th Baronet of Kempsford	Christopher John Thynne; 1934–2017	Valentine Charles Thynne; 1937–1979
Ceawlin Thynn b. 1974; 8th Marquess of Bath, 10th Viscount Weymouth and Baron Thynne, 11th Baronet of Kempsford	Lucien Henry Valentine Thynne b. 1965
John Alexander Ladi Thynn b. 2014 styled Viscount Weymouth
