= Henry Thynne, 3rd Marquess of Bath =

British naval commander and politician

Captain The Most Honourable The Marquess of Bath
- Arms of Thynne: Quarterly: 1st and 4th: Barry of ten or and sable (Boteville); 2nd and 3rd: Argent, a lion rampant with tail nowed and erected gules (Thynne)

Member of Parliament for Weobley
- In office 1824-1826; 1828-1832

Personal details
- Born: 24 May 1797
- Died: 24 June 1837 (aged 40)
- Party: Tory
- Spouse: Harriet Baring (m. 1830)
- Children: 4, including John and Henry
- Parent: Thomas Thynne (father)
- Relatives: Thomas Thynne (brother); Edward Thynne (brother); Charlotte Scott (sister); George Byng (grandfather); Thomas Thynne (grandfather)
- Military career
- Branch: Royal Navy
- Rank: Captain

Henry Frederick Thynne, 3rd Marquess of Bath (24 May 1797 – 24 June 1837), styled Lord Henry Thynne until January 1837 and Viscount Weymouth between January and March 1837, was a British naval commander and politician.

== Biography ==
Thynne was the second son of Thomas Thynne, 2nd Marquess of Bath, whom he succeeded in March 1837 (his unmarried elder brother Thomas had predeceased their father by two months). He inherited land in County Monaghan, Shropshire, Somerset and Wiltshire.

He was educated at Eton College. He then served in the Royal Navy and rose to the rank of captain in 1822 after which he transferred to the Signals Corps and did not return to sea. From 1824 to 1826 and 1828 to 1832, he was MP (Tory) for Weobley, Herefordshire.

== Family ==
Lord Bath married the Honourable Harriet Baring, daughter of Alexander Baring, 1st Baron Ashburton, on 19 April 1830. They had four children:

- Lady Louisa Isabella Harriet Thynne (1834 – 26 June 1919); married 1862 General Hon. Sir Percy Feilding, son of William Feilding, 7th Earl of Denbigh and had issue.
- Lady Alice Thynne (d. 1847)
- John Alexander Thynne, 4th Marquess of Bath (1831–1896)
- Lord Henry Frederick Thynne (1832–1904); married Lady Ulrica Seymour, daughter of Edward Seymour, 12th Duke of Somerset and had issue.

== Death ==
Lord Bath died suddenly in 1837, having been Marquess for only three months, and was buried on 1 July 1837 at Longbridge Deverill, near his home, Longleat House in Wiltshire. He was succeeded by his eldest son John.

Family tree summary for the Thynnes of Longleat from about 1500

Ralph Botevile
Thomas Thynne	William Thynne d. 1546
John Thynne of Longleat c. 1515–1580	Francis Thynne c. 1544–1608
John Thynneof Longleat; 1555–1604	Charles Thynne c. 1568–1652
Thomas Thynne of Longleat c. 1578–1639
Baronet of Caus Castle, of Kempsford in the County of Gloucester, 1641
James of Longleat; 1605–1670	Thomas of Richmond d. 1669	Henry Frederick Thynne; 1615–1680; 1st Baronet of Kempsford
Baron Thynne, 1680; Viscount Weymouth, 1682
Thomas of Longleat, 1648–1682	Thomas Thynne; 1640–1714 inherited Longleat, 1682; 1st Viscount Weymouth and Baron Thynne, 2nd Baronet of Kempsford	James Thynne of Buckland d. 1709	Henry Thynne Frederick d. 1705
unmarried
Henry Thynne; 1675–1708	Thomas Thynne d. 1710
two daughters but no sons
Thomas Thynne; 1710–1751; 2nd Viscount Weymouth and Baron Thynne, 3rd Baronet of Kempsford
Marquess of Bath, 1789	Baron Carteret (2nd creation), 1784
Thomas Thynne; 1734–1796; 1st Marquess of Bath, 3rd Viscount Weymouth and Baron Thynne, 4th Baronet of Kempsford	Henry Carteret; 1735–1826; 1st Baron Carteret
Thomas Thynne; 1765–1837; 2nd Marquess of Bath, 4th Viscount Weymouth and Baron Thynne, 5th Baronet of Kempsford	George Thynne; 1770–1838; 2nd Baron Carteret	John Thynne; 1772–1849; 3rd Baron Carteret
Baron Carteret extinct, 1849
Henry Thynne 1797–1837; 3rd Marquess of Bath, 5th Viscount Weymouth and Baron Thynne, 6th Baronet of Kempsford	Edward Thynne; 1807–1884	Lady Charlotte Anne Thynne; 1811–1895 marr.: Walter Montagu Douglas Scott, Duke of Buccleuch and had issue.
John Thynne; 1831–1896; 4th Marquess of Bath, 6th Viscount Weymouth and Baron Thynne, 7th Baronet of Kempsford	Henry Thynne; 1832–1904
Thomas Thynne; 1862–1946; 5th Marquess of Bath, 7th Viscount Weymouth and Baron Thynne, 8th Baronet of Kempsford	Ulric Oliver Thynne; 1871–1957
Henry Thynne; 1905–1992; 6th Marquess of Bath, 8th Viscount Weymouth and Baron Thynne, 9th Baronet of Kempsford
Thomas Timothy Thynne; 1929–1930	Alexander George Thynn; 1930–2020; 7th Marquess of Bath, 9th Viscount Weymouth and Baron Thynne, 10th Baronet of Kempsford	Christopher John Thynne; 1934–2017	Valentine Charles Thynne; 1937–1979
Ceawlin Thynn b. 1974; 8th Marquess of Bath, 10th Viscount Weymouth and Baron Thynne, 11th Baronet of Kempsford	Lucien Henry Valentine Thynne b. 1965
John Alexander Ladi Thynn b. 2014 styled Viscount Weymouth

Parliament of the United Kingdom
Preceded by Sir George Cockburn, Bt; Lord Frederick Cavendish-Bentinck	Member of Parliament for Weobley; 1824 – 1826; With: Sir George Cockburn, Bt	Succeeded by Sir George Cockburn, Bt; Lord William Thynne
Preceded by Sir George Cockburn, Bt; Lord William Thynne	Member of Parliament for Weobley; 1828 – 1832; With: Lord William Thynne to 1831; Lord Edward Thynne from 1831	borough disenfranchised
Peerage of Great Britain
Preceded by Thomas Thynne	Marquess of Bath; March–June 1837	Succeeded by John Thynne
