= Lord Henry Thynne =

British politician

The Right Honourable Lord Henry Thynne DL
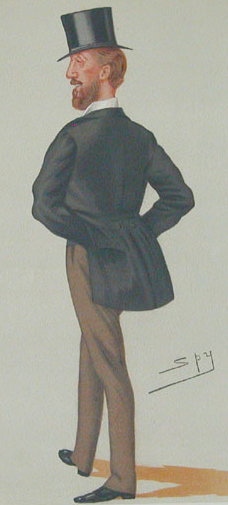
- Lord Henry Thynne by Leslie Ward, 1877.

Treasurer of the Household
- In office 14 December 1875 – 21 April 1880
- Monarch: Victoria
- Prime Minister: Benjamin Disraeli
- Preceded by: Earl Percy
- Succeeded by: The Earl of Breadalbane

Personal details
- Born: 2 August 1832
- Died: 28 January 1904 (aged 71)
- Party: Conservative
- Spouse(s): Lady Ulrica Seymour (d. 1916)
- Children: Ulric Oliver Thynne & Rachel Thynne

Lord Henry "Harry" Frederick Thynne PC DL (2 August 1832 – 28 January 1904) was a British Conservative politician. He served under Benjamin Disraeli as Treasurer of the Household between 1875 and 1880.

== Background ==
Thynne was the second son of Henry Thynne, 3rd Marquess of Bath, and his wife the Honourable Harriet Baring, daughter of Alexander Baring, 1st Baron Ashburton. John Thynne, 4th Marquess of Bath, was his elder brother.

== Political career ==
Thynne entered the House of Commons in 1859 as Member of Parliament for South Wiltshire, a seat he held until 1885, and served under Benjamin Disraeli as Treasurer of the Household from 1875 to 1880. In 1876 he was admitted to the Privy Council. Apart from his political career he was also a Major in the Wiltshire Yeomanry Cavalry and a Deputy Lieutenant for Wiltshire.

== Family ==
Thynne married on 1 June 1858 Lady Ulrica Frederica Jane Seymour, daughter of Edward Seymour, 12th Duke of Somerset. They had four sons and two daughters:

- Henry "Harry" Boteville Thynne (1860–1887), committed suicide in his lodgings, Duke-street. St. James's, London
- Thomas Ulric Thynne (1861-1911), Royal Navy officer; m. 1898 Dorothy Mary Warner, daughter of Charles William Warner, CB
- John "Ion" Alexander Roger Thynne (1863-1914)
- Colonel Ulric Oliver Thynne, DSO (1871–1957), British Army officer; m. 1899 Marjory Wormald, daughter of Edward Wormald, and had issue
- Alice Ruth Hermione Thynne (1866-1948); m. 1889 Alexander Edward Lane Fox-Pitt Rivers
- Alice Rachel Thynne (d.1938)

Lord Henry died in January 1904, aged 71. Lady Ulrica survived him by twelve years and died in January 1916.

Family tree summary for the Thynnes of Longleat from about 1500

Ralph Botevile
Thomas Thynne	William Thynne d. 1546
John Thynne of Longleat c. 1515–1580	Francis Thynne c. 1544–1608
John Thynneof Longleat; 1555–1604	Charles Thynne c. 1568–1652
Thomas Thynne of Longleat c. 1578–1639
Baronet of Caus Castle, of Kempsford in the County of Gloucester, 1641
James of Longleat; 1605–1670	Thomas of Richmond d. 1669	Henry Frederick Thynne; 1615–1680; 1st Baronet of Kempsford
Baron Thynne, 1680; Viscount Weymouth, 1682
Thomas of Longleat, 1648–1682	Thomas Thynne; 1640–1714 inherited Longleat, 1682; 1st Viscount Weymouth and Baron Thynne, 2nd Baronet of Kempsford	James Thynne of Buckland d. 1709	Henry Thynne Frederick d. 1705
unmarried
Henry Thynne; 1675–1708	Thomas Thynne d. 1710
two daughters but no sons
Thomas Thynne; 1710–1751; 2nd Viscount Weymouth and Baron Thynne, 3rd Baronet of Kempsford
Marquess of Bath, 1789	Baron Carteret (2nd creation), 1784
Thomas Thynne; 1734–1796; 1st Marquess of Bath, 3rd Viscount Weymouth and Baron Thynne, 4th Baronet of Kempsford	Henry Carteret; 1735–1826; 1st Baron Carteret
Thomas Thynne; 1765–1837; 2nd Marquess of Bath, 4th Viscount Weymouth and Baron Thynne, 5th Baronet of Kempsford	George Thynne; 1770–1838; 2nd Baron Carteret	John Thynne; 1772–1849; 3rd Baron Carteret
Baron Carteret extinct, 1849
Henry Thynne 1797–1837; 3rd Marquess of Bath, 5th Viscount Weymouth and Baron Thynne, 6th Baronet of Kempsford	Edward Thynne; 1807–1884	Lady Charlotte Anne Thynne; 1811–1895 marr.: Walter Montagu Douglas Scott, Duke of Buccleuch and had issue.
John Thynne; 1831–1896; 4th Marquess of Bath, 6th Viscount Weymouth and Baron Thynne, 7th Baronet of Kempsford	Henry Thynne; 1832–1904
Thomas Thynne; 1862–1946; 5th Marquess of Bath, 7th Viscount Weymouth and Baron Thynne, 8th Baronet of Kempsford	Ulric Oliver Thynne; 1871–1957
Henry Thynne; 1905–1992; 6th Marquess of Bath, 8th Viscount Weymouth and Baron Thynne, 9th Baronet of Kempsford
Thomas Timothy Thynne; 1929–1930	Alexander George Thynn; 1930–2020; 7th Marquess of Bath, 9th Viscount Weymouth and Baron Thynne, 10th Baronet of Kempsford	Christopher John Thynne; 1934–2017	Valentine Charles Thynne; 1937–1979
Ceawlin Thynn b. 1974; 8th Marquess of Bath, 10th Viscount Weymouth and Baron Thynne, 11th Baronet of Kempsford	Lucien Henry Valentine Thynne b. 1965
John Alexander Ladi Thynn b. 2014 styled Viscount Weymouth

Parliament of the United Kingdom
Preceded by Hon. Sidney Herbert; William Wyndham	Member of Parliament for South Wiltshire; 1859–1885; With: Hon. Sidney Herbert 1859–1861; Frederick Hervey-Bathurst 1861–1865; Thomas Grove 1865–1874; Viscount Folkestone 1874–1885	Constituency abolished
Political offices
Preceded by Earl Percy	Treasurer of the Household; 1875–1880	Succeeded by The Earl of Breadalbane
