= Henry Thynne, 6th Marquess of Bath =

British politician (1905–1992)

The Most Honourable The Marquess of Bath JP
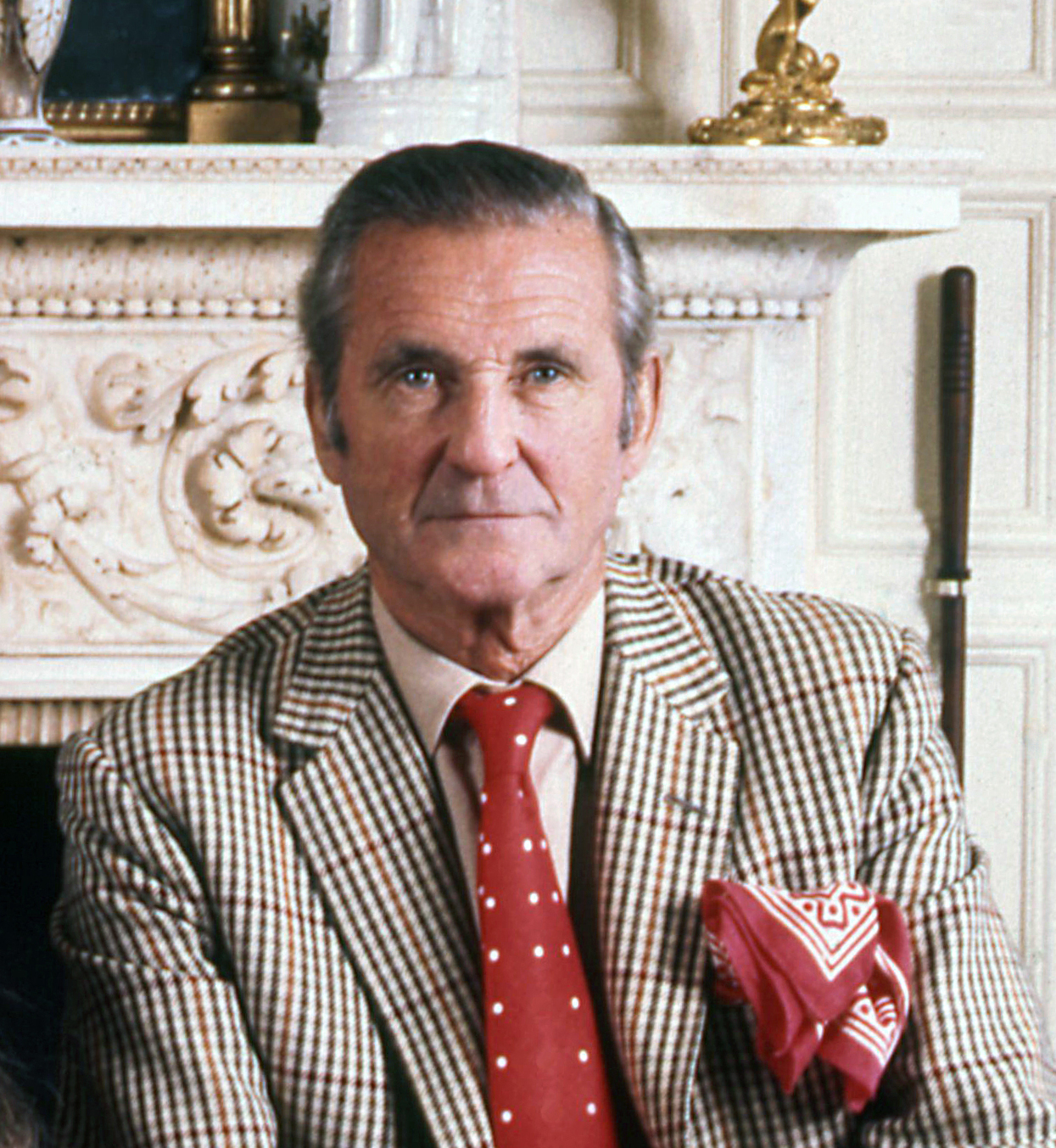
- 1973 photograph by Allan Warren

Member of Parliament for Frome
- In office 27 October 1931 – 25 October 1935
- Preceded by: Frederick Gould
- Succeeded by: Mavis Tate

Personal details
- Born: Lord Henry Frederick Thynne; 26 January 1905
- Died: 30 June 1992 (aged 87)
- Party: Conservative
- Spouses: The Hon. Daphne Vivian (m. 1927; div. 1953) Virginia Tennant (m. 1953)
- Children: Caroline Somerset, Duchess of Beaufort; Thomas Thynne; Alexander Thynn, 7th Marquess of Bath; Lord Christopher Thynne; Lord Valentine Thynne; Lady Silvy McQuiston
- Parents: Thomas Thynne, 5th Marquess of Bath; Violet Mordaunt
- Education: Harrow School; Christ Church, Oxford
- Occupation: Aristocrat, landowner, politician

Military service
- Allegiance: United Kingdom
- Branch/service: British Army
- Rank: Major
- Unit: Royal Wiltshire Yeomanry
- Battles/wars: World War II
- Awards: Efficiency Decoration; Bronze Star

Henry Frederick Thynne, 6th Marquess of Bath ED JP (26 January 1905 – 30 June 1992), styled Lord Henry Thynne until 1916 and Viscount Weymouth between 1916 and 1946, was a British aristocrat, landowner, and Conservative Party politician.

== Background and education ==
Lord Bath was the second son of Thomas Thynne, 5th Marquess of Bath, and Violet Mordaunt, the illegitimate daughter of Harriet Mordaunt and Lowry Cole, 4th Earl of Enniskillen. He was educated at the New Beacon School, Sevenoaks, Harrow, and Christ Church, Oxford. In 1916 he became the heir apparent to his father's estates and peerages after his elder brother, John, was killed in action in the First World War.

At Oxford, Thynne was part of the Railway Club, which included: Henry Yorke, Roy Harrod, David Plunket Greene, Harry Fox-Strangways, Brian Howard, Michael Rosse, John Sutro, Hugh Lygon, Harold Acton, Bryan Guinness, Patrick Balfour, Mark Ogilvie-Grant, and John Drury-Lowe.

In the 1920s the tabloid press considered him one of the Bright Young Things.

== Political and military careers ==
As Viscount Weymouth, he was elected as the Member of Parliament (MP) for Frome between 1931 and 1935, and served as a member of the Council of the Duchy of Cornwall from 1933 to 1936 and Justice of the Peace for Wiltshire in 1938.

He gained the rank of major in the service of the Royal Wiltshire Yeomanry, fought in the Second World War, and was awarded the Bronze Star.

Thynne succeeded his father as Marquess of Bath in 1946. He was noted for his forestry work on the ancestral estate of Longleat. It was he who developed the safari park and opened the house to the public in 1949.

From 1960 onwards he amassed what would become the largest collection of paintings by Adolf Hitler, numbering sixty by 1983. To some extent an admirer of Hitler, the Marquess is quoted as saying “Hitler did a hell of a lot for his country”.

== Family ==
On 27 October 1927, Lord Weymouth married, first, Daphne Vivian, daughter of George Vivian, 4th Baron Vivian. Before divorcing, in 1953, they had five children:

- Lady Caroline Jane Thynne (1928–1995); married David Somerset, 11th Duke of Beaufort, and had issue.
- The Honourable Thomas Timothy Thynne (1929–1930); died in infancy.
- Alexander George Thynn, 7th Marquess of Bath (1932–2020); married Anna Gyarmathy and had issue.
- Lord Christopher John Thynne (1934–2017); married Antonia Palmer, daughter of Sir Anthony Palmer, 4th Baronet, and had issue.
- Lord Valentine Charles Thynne (1937–1979); married, first, Veronica Jacks and had issue. He married, secondly, Susanne Alder; and, thirdly, Liese Dennis.

After becoming Lord Bath he married, secondly, Virginia Penelope Parsons (1917–2003), on 15 July 1953, following her divorce earlier that year from David Tennant. They had one daughter:

- Lady Silvy Cerne Thynne (b. 22 December 1958); married Iain McQuiston and has issue. A sister-in-law of the current Marchioness of Bath.

Family tree summary for the Thynnes of Longleat from about 1500

Ralph Botevile
Thomas Thynne	William Thynne d. 1546
John Thynne of Longleat alias Boteville c. 1515–1580	Francis Thynne c. 1544–1608
John Thynne of Longleat; 1555–1604	Charles Thynne c. 1568–1652
Thomas Thynne of Longleat c. 1578–1639
Baronet of Caus Castle, of Kempsford in the County of Gloucester, 1641
James of Longleat; 1605–1670	Thomas of Richmond d. 1669	Henry Frederick Thynne; 1615–1680; 1st Baronet of Kempsford
Baron Thynne, 1680; Viscount Weymouth, 1682
Thomas of Longleat; 1648–1682	Thomas Thynne; 1640–1714 inherited Longleat, 1682; 1st Viscount Weymouth, etc., 2nd Baronet of Kempsford	James Thynne of Buckland d. 1709	Henry Thynne Frederick d. 1705
unmarried
Henry Thynne; 1675–1708	Thomas Thynne d. 1710
two daughters but no sons
Thomas Thynne; 1710–1751; 2nd Viscount Weymouth, etc., 3rd Baronet of Kempsford
Marquess of Bath, 1789	Baron Carteret (2nd creation), 1784
Thomas Thynne; 1734–1796; 1st Marquess of Bath, 3rd Viscount Weymouth, etc., 4th Baronet of Kempsford	Henry Frederick Carteret; 1735–1826; 1st Baron Carteret
Thomas Thynne; 1765–1837; 2nd Marquess of Bath, 4th Viscount Weymouth, etc., 5th Baronet of Kempsford	George Thynne; 1770–1838; 2nd Baron Carteret	John Thynne; 1772–1849; 3rd Baron Carteret
Carteret barony extinct, 1849
Henry Frederick Thynne 1797–1837; 3rd Marquess of Bath, 5th Viscount Weymouth, etc., 6th Baronet of Kempsford	Edward Thynne; 1807–1884	Charlotte Anne Thynne; 1811–1895 marr.: Walter Montagu Douglas Scott, Duke of Buccleuch and had issue.
John Alexander Thynne; 1831–1896; 4th Marquess of Bath, 6th Viscount Weymouth, etc., 7th Baronet of Kempsford	Henry "Harry" Frederick Thynne; 1832–1904
Thomas Henry Thynne; 1862–1946; 5th Marquess of Bath, 7th Viscount Weymouth, etc., 8th Baronet of Kempsford	Ulric Oliver Thynne; 1871–1957
Henry Frederick Thynne; 1905–1992; 6th Marquess of Bath, 8th Viscount Weymouth, etc., 9th Baronet of Kempsford
Thomas Timothy Thynne; 1929–1930	Alexander George Thynn; 1930–2020; 7th Marquess of Bath, 9th Viscount Weymouth, etc., 10th Baronet of Kempsford	Christopher John Thynne; 1934–2017	Valentine Charles Thynne; 1937–1979
Ceawlin Henry Laszlo Thynn b. 1974; 8th Marquess of Bath, 10th Viscount Weymouth, etc., 11th Baronet of Kempsford	Lucien Henry Valentine Thynne b. 1965
John Alexander Ladi Thynn b. 2014 styled Viscount Weymouth
Heir apparent to the Marquess of Bath

Parliament of the United Kingdom
Preceded by Frederick Gould	Member of Parliament for Frome; 1931–1935	Succeeded by Mavis Tate
Peerage of Great Britain
Preceded by Thomas Thynne	Marquess of Bath; 1946–1992	Succeeded by Alexander Thynn
