= Alexander Thynn, 7th Marquess of Bath =

English politician, artist, and author (1932–2020)

The Most Honourable The Marquess of Bath
- Bath in 1994 by Fergus Greer

Personal details
- Born: Alexander George Thynne; 6 May 1932 London, England
- Died: 4 April 2020 (aged 87) Bath, England
- Party: Liberal Democrats (1992–2020)
- Other political affiliations: Wessex Regionalists (1974–1992)
- Spouse: Anna Gyarmathy (m. 1969)
- Children: 3, including: Lady Lenka Thynn; Ceawlin Thynn, 8th Marquess of Bath
- Parents: Henry Thynne, 6th Marquess of Bath; Daphne Fielding
- Education: Eton College; Christ Church, Oxford
- Occupation: Landowner, artist, author

Alexander George Thynn, 7th Marquess of Bath (6 May 1932 – 4 April 2020), styled Viscount Weymouth between 1946 and 1992, was an English peer and landowner, owner of the Longleat estate, who sat in the House of Lords from 1992 until 1999, and an artist and author.

Lord Bath was in the media spotlight for his hippy fashion-sense and his many "wifelets", the latter of which earned him the nickname "the loins of Longleat" in reference to his prodigious sexual appetites and the name of his estate, which includes a safari park that prominently markets its lions. The Sunday Times Rich List 2009 gave him an estimated wealth of £157 million.

== Early life and education ==
Thynn was born in London, the son of Henry Thynne, 6th Marquess of Bath and Daphne Fielding, and grew up at his family seat, Longleat, a grand Elizabethan house set in Wiltshire parkland landscaped in the 18th century by Capability Brown. After attending Ludgrove School and Eton College, he joined the Life Guards for National Service, being commissioned as a Lieutenant in 1951. He then went up to Christ Church, Oxford, where he was President of the Bullingdon Club, before embarking upon a modern-day European Grand Tour. During the 1950s, he studied art in Paris.

== Political career ==
As Viscount Weymouth, he stood in the February 1974 General Election as a Wessex regionalist, believing that Wessex would be better off as a devolved region of the UK. Shortly after that General Election, he became one of the founders of the Wessex Regionalist Party. He stood for the party in the first ever elections to the European Parliament in 1979.

After succeeding to his father's marquessate and other titles in 1992, Lord Bath sat in the House of Lords as a Liberal Democrat, until he lost his right to sit in the Upper House following New Labour's House of Lords reforms which ousted all but 92 of the hereditary peers. Among other issues, he spoke in favour of devolution for the regions of England.

== Personal life ==
In 1969, Thynn married Hungarian-born Anna Gyarmathy, also known as Anna Gaël, by whom he had two children, Lady Lenka Abigail Thynn and Ceawlin, 8th Marquess of Bath, both of whom were educated at comprehensive school. Lord Bath also acknowledged an illegitimate daughter born c. 2000. He had open sexual relations with over seventy women during his marriage, many of whom lived in "grace and favour" in estate cottages. Lord Bath referred to his mistresses as wifelets. According to The Times (2015): "The wifelets have included former Bond girls and Sri Lankan teenagers, as well as housewives and, according to some, prostitutes."

Born with the family name Thynne, he dropped the "e" in 1976, as he wanted to emphasise its correct pronunciation to rhyme with "pin" and not "pine". He was known for his colourful style of dress, which he acquired while he was an art student in Paris, and was a prolific amateur painter who decorated rooms of his home with erotic scenes from the Kama Sutra.

Following his father's death in 1992, he dismissed his younger brother Lord Christopher Thynne as estate comptroller, evicting him from his home on the Longleat estate. In early 2010, he passed the management of the business to his son, then Viscount Weymouth. By one account, the Viscount intended to evict the mistresses from their estate cottages. Some of his father's murals were removed, which caused a rift and led to a boycott by the Marquess of his son's marriage to Emma McQuiston.

== Death ==
Lord Bath was admitted to the Royal United Hospital, Bath, on 28 March 2020 and while in hospital tested positive for COVID-19 during the COVID-19 pandemic. He died of pneumonia whilst infected by the virus on 4 April 2020, aged 87.

== Appearances and media ==
In 1999, Thynn appeared in series 6, episode 4 of Time Team, which dealt with the excavation of a cave in the Cheddar Gorge, an area of land owned by him. From 2000 to 2009, Animal Park, a television documentary about the life of keepers and animals at Longleat Safari Park, Wiltshire, England, aired over nine series on the BBC. It also covered the daily life of workers in Longleat House, the estate and the gardens and regularly featured items about Lord Bath himself.

In March 2009, he appeared in episode 4 of Heston's Feasts. The Marquess of Bath, a book by Nesta Wyn Ellis, initially written with Bath's co-operation, was published in the autumn of 2010. Lord Bath's autobiography, collectively called Strictly Private to Public Exposure, was first published as a series by Artnik Books, and since 2002 has been republished by Top Spot Publishing. His other screen credits include an episode of Globe Trekker. He played an aristocrat in the music video for the Pet Shop Boys song "Rent".

Artist and potter Grayson Perry interviewed the marquess in the third of his three-part 2012 documentary series All in the Best Possible Taste with Grayson Perry which focused on Britain's upper class. In 2014, Thynn appeared in All Change at Longleat, a three-part documentary of some of the issues as he passed the running of the house to his son.

== See also ==
- Burke's Peerage & Baronetage

== Bibliography ==
- Bath, Alexander Thynn (2000). The New World Order of Alexander Thynn: Views on Politics, Society and Religion by the Marquess of Bath. London: Starhaven. ISBN 0-936315-13-X.
- Bath, Alexander Thynn (2002). Strictly Private to Public Exposure (Series 1: A Plateful of Privilege). London: Artnik. ISBN 978-1-903906-08-8.
- Ellis, Nesta (2010). The Marquess of Bath. London: Dynasty Press. ISBN 978-0-9553507-4-0.

Peerage of Great Britain
Preceded by Henry Thynne	Marquess of Bath; 1992–2020	Succeeded by Ceawlin Thynn
