= John Thynne, 3rd Baron Carteret =

British politician

The Right Honourable The Lord Carteret PC

Vice-Chamberlain of the Household
- In office 1804–1812
- Monarch: George III
- Prime Minister: William Pitt the Younger; The Lord Grenville; The Duke of Portland; Spencer Perceval
- Preceded by: Charles Francis Greville
- Succeeded by: The Earl of Yarmouth

Personal details
- Born: 28 December 1772
- Died: 10 March 1849 (aged 76) Hawnes Place, Bedfordshire
- Spouse: Mary Anne Master (m. 1801)
- Education: St John's College, Cambridge

John Thynne, 3rd Baron Carteret PC (28 December 1772 – 10 March 1849), known as Lord John Thynne between 1789 and 1838, was a British peer and politician.

== Background and education ==
Carteret was the third son of Thomas Thynne, 1st Marquess of Bath, and Lady Elizabeth Bentinck, daughter of William Bentinck, 2nd Duke of Portland. He was educated at St John's College, Cambridge.

== Political career ==
Carteret was returned to Parliament for Weobly in May 1796, a seat he held until December the same year, and then represented Bath between 1796 and 1832. He served as Vice-Chamberlain of the Household from 1804 to 1812 and was sworn into the Privy Council in 1804.

In 1838 he succeeded his childless elder brother George in the barony and took his seat in the House of Lords.

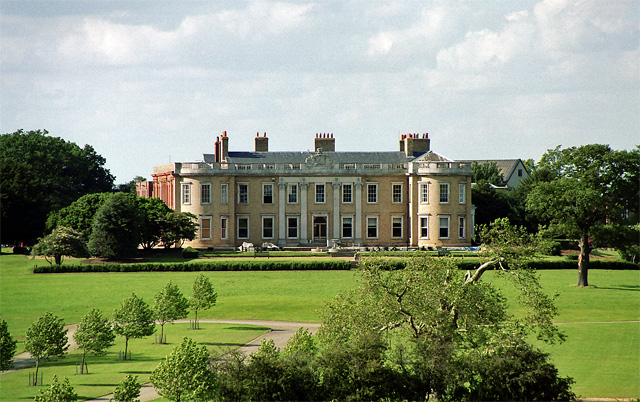
Hawnes Park, (later Haynes Park)

== Marriage ==
In 1801 Lord Carteret married Mary Anne Master (died February 1863), daughter of Thomas Master. They had no children. After his death, Lady Carteret retired to Upper Brook Street, Mayfair.

== Death and succession ==
He died at his house Hawnes Park in March 1849, aged 76. On his death the barony became extinct, while the estate passed to his nephew the Rev. Lord John Thynne, third son of Thomas Thynne, 2nd Marquess of Bath and sub-Dean of Westminster.

Parliament of Great Britain
| Preceded by John Scott; Lord George Thynne | Member of Parliament for Weobly; 1796; With: Lord George Thynne | Succeeded by Lord George Thynne; Inigo Freeman Thomas |
| Preceded by Viscount Weymouth; Sir Richard Arden | Member of Parliament for Bath; 1796–1801; With: Sir Richard Arden | Succeeded by Parliament of the United Kingdom |
Parliament of the United Kingdom
| Preceded by Parliament of Great Britain | Member of Parliament for Bath; 1801–1832; With: Sir Richard Arden 1801; John Palmer 1801–1808; Charles Palmer 1808–1826, 1830–1832; The Earl of Brecknock 1826–1830 | Succeeded by Charles Palmer; John Arthur Roebuck |
Political offices
| Preceded by Charles Francis Greville | Vice-Chamberlain of the Household; 1804–1812 | Succeeded by The Earl of Yarmouth |
Peerage of Great Britain
| Preceded by George Thynn | Baron Carteret; 1838–1849 | Extinct |
