= Peacham (disambiguation) =

Peacham is a town in the U.S. state of Vermont

Peacham may also refer to:

- Henry Peacham (born 1546), was an English curate, best known for his treatise on rhetoric titled The Garden of Eloquence first published in 1577
- Henry Peacham (born 1578), son of Henry Peacham (born 1546), was a poet and writer, known today primarily for his book, The Compleat Gentleman, first printed in 1622

== See also ==
- The Peacham drawing (the only surviving contemporary Shakespearean illustration)
