= Peacham drawing =

Contemporary Shakespearean illustration

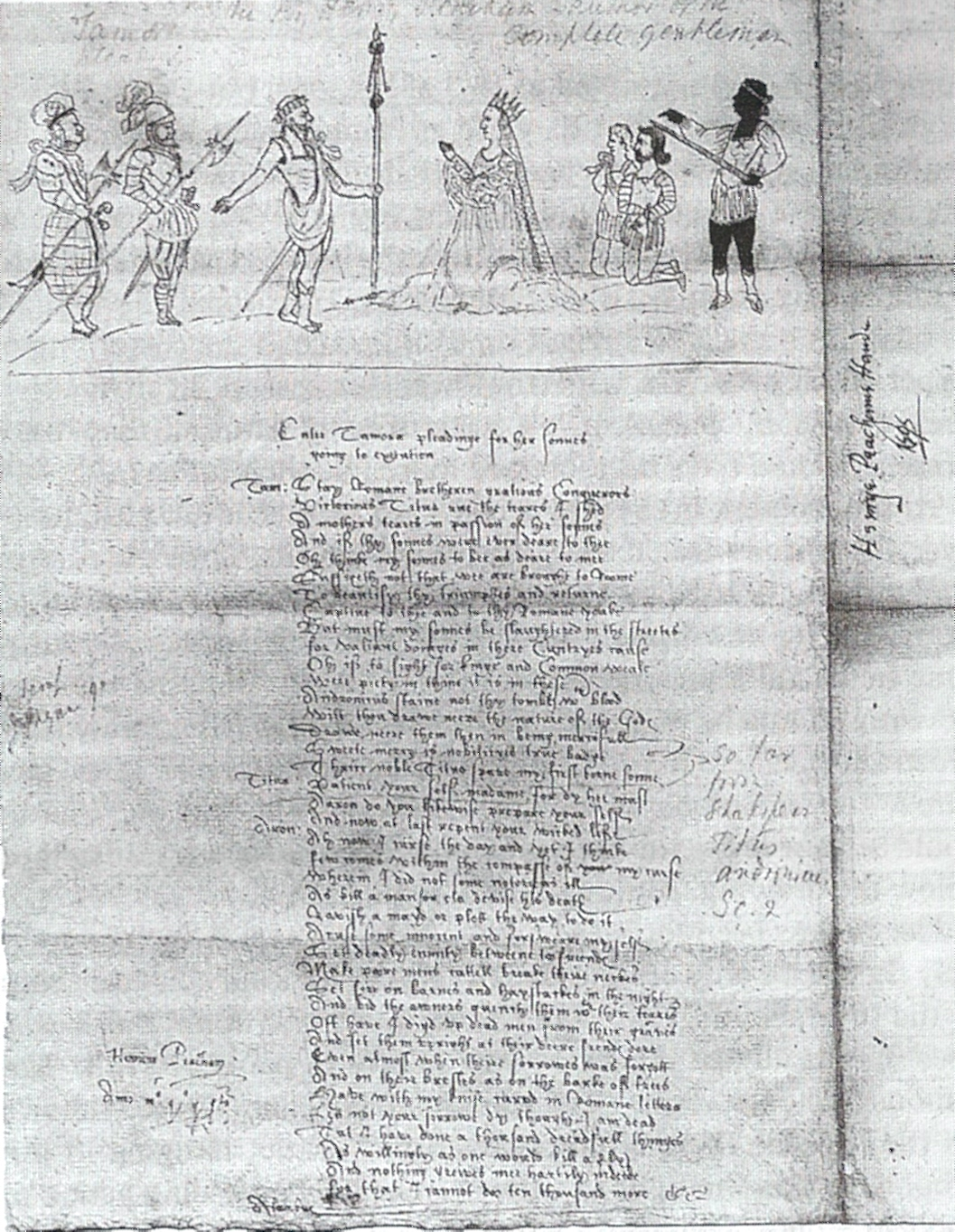
The Peacham drawing (c.1595?)

The Peacham drawing, or 'Longleat manuscript', is the only surviving contemporary Shakespearean illustration, now in the library of the Marquess of Bath at Longleat in Wiltshire. The drawing appears to depict a performance of Titus Andronicus, under which is quoted some dialogue. Eugene M. Waith argues of the illustration that "the gestures and costumes give us a more vivid impression of the visual impact of Elizabethan acting than we get from any other source."

In the sketch, Tamora (Queen of the Goths in the play) is shown pleading with her captor, Titus (a renowned general in the Roman army). Behind her, kneel her sons, Chiron and Demetrius, their hands tied behind their backs, and behind them stands Aaron (a Moor involved in a secret sexual relationship with Tamora), who is armed and pointing at them. Behind Titus are two male figures who may be two of his sons, but due to their dress, are more likely to be attendant soldiers.

The illustration depicts no one specific moment from the play. In Act 1, Titus decides to avenge the death of his own sons in battle by sacrificing Tamora's eldest son, Alarbus, prompting her to plead with him for her son's life, which is what she is pictured doing in the illustration. In the play, however, when Tamora is pleading with Titus for the release of Alarbus (who isn't present in the illustration), Aaron is still a prisoner. In the illustration, he is free and armed. It may be this sword is not a literal one but instead was meant by the illustrator to be a sword of lath (a prop associated with the Vice figure of medieval morality plays), as a way of showing Aaron's villainy.

Beneath the illustration and above the text is written a stage direction; "Enter Tamora pleadinge for her sonnes going to execution." This is an invented stage direction, not found in any known text of the play. Below this, lines from Act 1 (Tamora's plea to Titus; 1.1.104-120 and one line of Titus' reply; 1.1.121) and Act 5 (Aaron's boast of his many vile deeds; 5.1.125-144) are quoted. After the final line of Aaron is written "et cetera" and below, written as a speech prefix is "Alarbus", although he has no lines in the play itself.

The illustration is signed in the lower left, "Henricus Peacham". Below the signature is a date; "Anno m^{o}q^{o}gq^{to}." There is no definitive theory as to the exact form of this date. The most common interpretation is 1595 (Latin: anno millesimo quingentesimo nonagesimo quinto), partly due to an inscription on the facing page reading "Henrye Peachams Hande 1595". However, this note appears to have been written by John Payne Collier, notorious Shakespearean forger, and as such cannot be seen as wholly reliable. Another annotation is written above the illustration; "Written by Henry Peacham – author of 'The Complete Gentleman'." This is also thought to be by Collier. Yet another annotation is found opposite the quote from Act 1; "So far from Shakespear Titus Andronicus Sc. 2." This may also be by Collier as it refers to a scene division found only in his edition of the play.

There are also some points of interest in the quoted text itself. There are many simple spelling alterations from the printed editions of Titus, but what is especially interesting is that some of them correspond to the first quarto text published in 1594 (Q1); some to the second quarto text, published in 1600 (Q2); some to the third, published in 1611 (Q3); and some to the First Folio text of 1623 (F1). For example, in Q1, the word "Haystacks" is spelt "Haystalks", in Q2 it is "haystakes" and in Q3 and F1, "haystackes". In the quoted text, the Q3/F1 spelling of "haystackes" is used, suggesting the text was transcribed no earlier than 1611. However, another change is "But" altered to "Tut". This was a change introduced into the text in Q2, and maintained in Q3 and F1, and some take it as evidence that the illustration cannot be earlier than Q2 (1600). Another change is the alteration of "sonne" to "sonnes" twice during Tamora's speech (line 106 and 108), although the singular "sonne" is maintained later. The invented stage direction also uses the plural "sonnes". Only F1 uses the plural form at line 106, in what is obviously a compositors error.

To add to the lack of definitive information, June Schlueter believes the Peacham drawing does not depict Titus at all, but a 1620 German version of the play entitled Eine sehr klägliche Tragaedia von Tito Andronico. Schlueter points out that the drawing perfectly illustrates the conclusion of Act 1 of Tito Andronico. At least one major Shakespearean scholar, Brian Vickers, supports Schlueter's arguments. Richard Levin, however, argues against many of Schlueter's claims, and affirms that the drawing is a contemporary "composite" reading of Shakespeare's tragedy.
