= Henry Peacham =

Henry Peacham may refer to:

- Henry Peacham (born 1546) (1546–1634), English clergyman and writer
- Henry Peacham (born 1578) (1578– in or after 1644), his son, English poet and writer
