= Thomas Thynne, 2nd Marquess of Bath =

British peer

The Most Honourable The Marquess of Bath KG
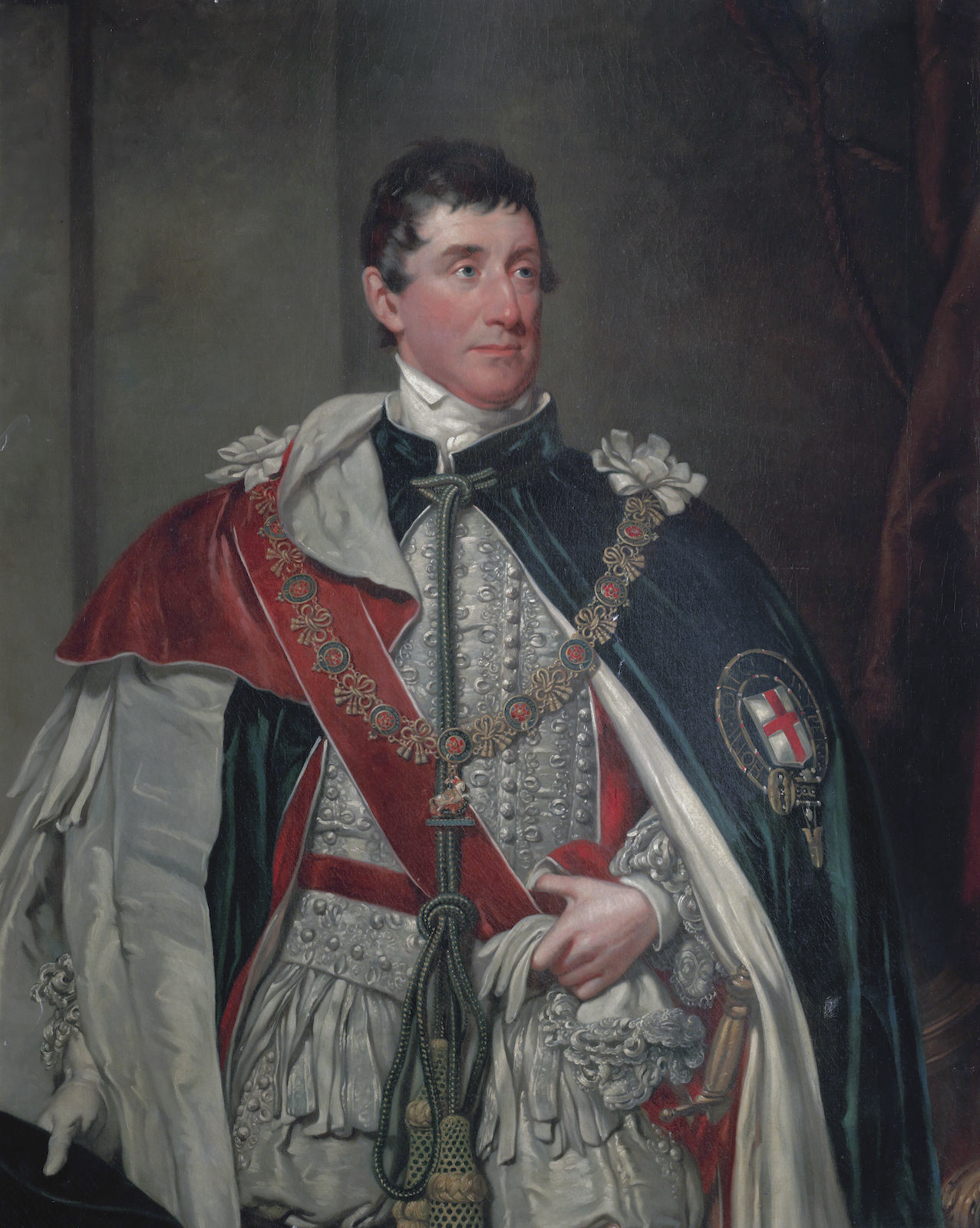

Lord Lieutenant of Somerset
- In office 1819–1837
- Preceded by: The Earl Poulett
- Succeeded by: The Earl of Ilchester

Personal details
- Born: 25 January 1765
- Died: 27 March 1837 (aged 72)
- Spouse: Hon. Isabella Byng (m. 1794; died 1830)
- Children: 11, including: Thomas Thynne, Viscount Weymouth; Henry Thynne, 3rd Marquess of Bath; Lord John Thynne; Lord Edward Thynne; Charlotte Montagu-Douglas-Scott, Duchess of Buccleuch
- Parents: Thomas Thynne, 1st Marquess of Bath; Lady Elizabeth Cavendish-Bentinck
- Education: St John's College, Cambridge

Arms of Thynne: Quarterly: 1st and 4th: Barry of ten or and sable (Boteville); 2nd and 3rd: Argent, a lion rampant with tail nowed and erected gules (Thynne)

Thomas Thynne, 2nd Marquess of Bath (25 January 1765 – 27 March 1837), styled Viscount Weymouth from 1789 until 1796, was a British peer.

== Life ==
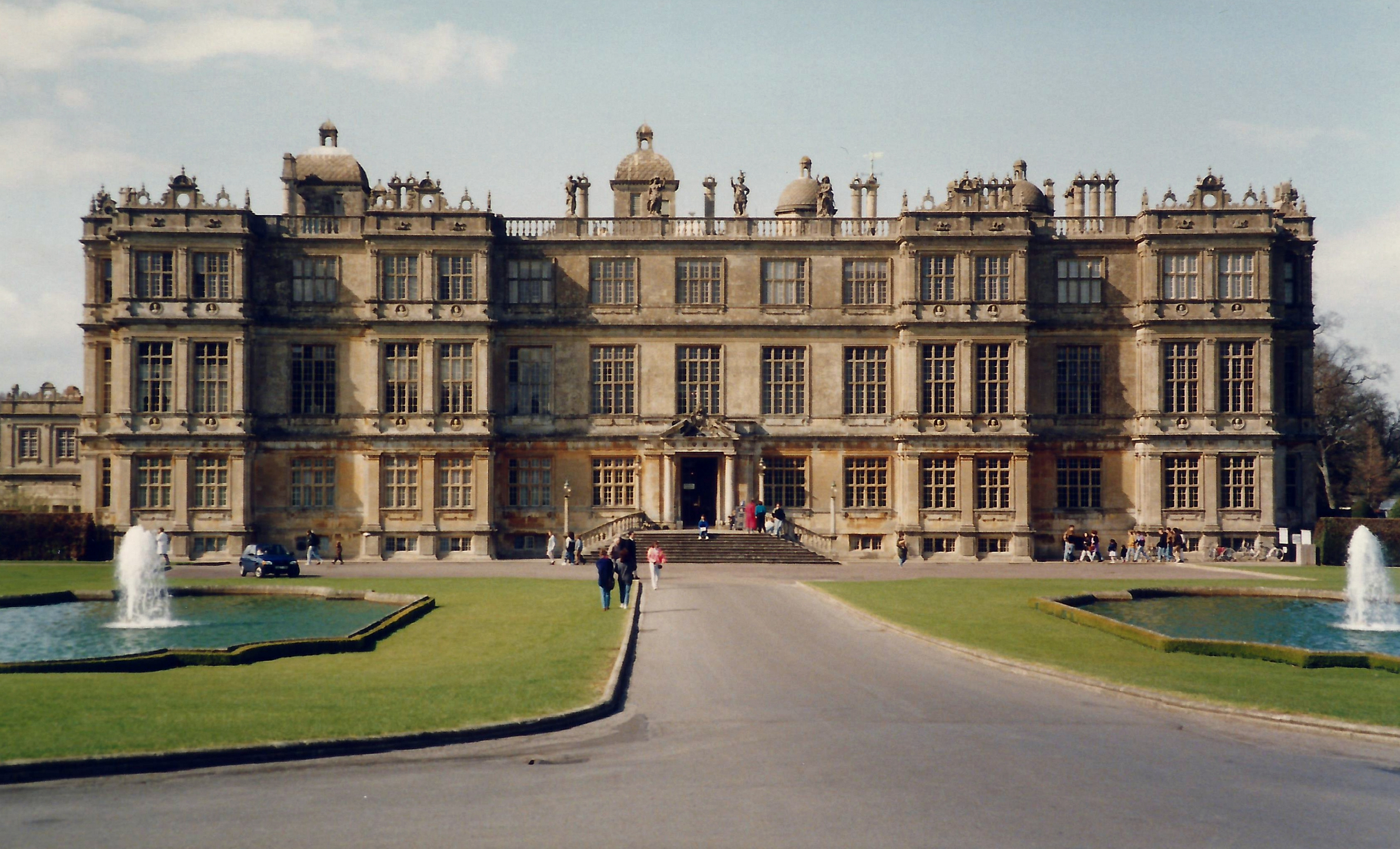
Longleat House, Wiltshire (seats of Marquess of Bath)

=== Early life ===
Thynne was the eldest son of Thomas Thynne, 1st Marquess of Bath, and Lady Elizabeth Cavendish-Bentinck. He succeeded as 2nd Marquess in 1796 on the death of his father.

He was educated at Winchester College and admitted as a nobleman to St John's College, Cambridge in 1785, graduating M.A. in 1787.

=== Political career ===
Between 1786 and 1790, he was MP (Tory) for Weobley. He later sat for Bath from 1790 to 1796. He was Lord Lieutenant of Somerset between 1819 and 1837 and was invested as a Knight of the Garter on 16 July 1823.

=== Later life and death ===
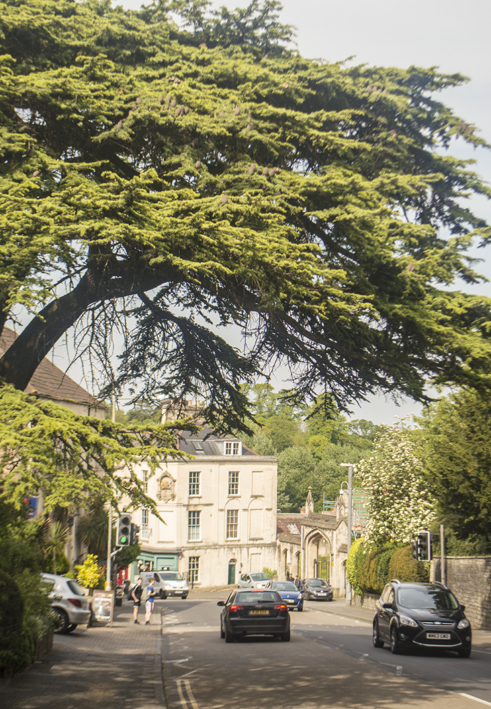
View of Bath Street, Frome

He was a benefactor in the nearby town of Frome, giving up land and buildings so that a new wide road could be created leading south from the town centre, now called Bath Street. On another occasion he set aside land for allotments for a hundred families. "I have been told that at a certain hour in the morning he would admit the humblest persons in his parish, listen to their little concerns, and advise them.....He was one of the few who well understood for what purposes rank, wealth, and influence, are conferred."

Lord Bath died in 1837, aged 72, and was buried at his home, Longleat House. "I was told ten thousand were present, one hundred and fifty horsemen." His eldest son Thomas predeceased him by some two months and he was therefore succeeded by his second son Henry.

== Marriage and progeny ==
Lord Bath married the Honourable Isabella Elizabeth Byng (21 September 1773 – 1 May 1830), daughter of George Byng, 4th Viscount Torrington, on 14 April 1794. They had eleven children:

- Lady Elizabeth Thynne (27 February 1795 – 16 February 1866); she married John Campbell, 1st Earl Cawdor on 5 September 1816. They had seven children.
- Thomas Thynne, Viscount Weymouth (9 April 1796 – 16 January 1837); he married Harriet Matilda Robbins on 11 May 1820.
- Henry Frederick Thynne, 3rd Marquess of Bath (4 May 1797 – 24 June 1837); he married Hon. Harriet Baring on 10 April 1830. They had four children.
- Lord John Thynne (7 November 1798 – 9 February 1881); he married Anne Beresford on 2 March 1824. They had nine children.
- Lady Louisa Thynne (25 March 1801 – 7 November 1859); she married Henry Lascelles, 3rd Earl of Harewood on 5 July 1823. They had thirteen children.
- Lord William Thynne (17 October 1803 – 30 January 1890); he married Belinda Brumel on 19 December 1861.
- Lord Francis Thynne (20 January 1805 – 29 May 1821)
- Lord Edward Thynne (23 January 1807 – 4 February 1884), married first Elizabeth Mellish and second Cecilia Anne Mary Gore, by whom he had issue.
- Lord George Thynne (25 December 1808 – 19 June 1832)
- Lady Charlotte Anne Thynne (10 April 1811 – 18 March 1895); she married Walter Montagu Douglas Scott, 5th Duke of Buccleuch on 13 August 1829. They had seven children.
- Reverend Lord Charles Thynne (9 February 1813 – 11 August 1894); he married the novelist Harriet Bagot on 18 July 1837. They had two children.

Family tree summary for the Thynnes of Longleat from about 1500

Ralph Botevile
Thomas Thynne | William Thynne d. 1546
John Thynne of Longleat alias Boteville c. 1515–1580 | Francis Thynne c. 1544–1608
John Thynne of Longleat; 1555–1604 | Charles Thynne c. 1568–1652
Thomas Thynne of Longleat c. 1578–1639
Baronet of Caus Castle, of Kempsford in the County of Gloucester, 1641
James of Longleat; 1605–1670 | Thomas of Richmond d. 1669 | Henry Frederick Thynne; 1615–1680; 1st Baronet of Kempsford
Baron Thynne, 1680; Viscount Weymouth, 1682
Thomas of Longleat; 1648–1682 | Thomas Thynne; 1640–1714 inherited Longleat, 1682; 1st Viscount Weymouth, etc., 2nd Baronet of Kempsford | James Thynne of Buckland d. 1709 | Henry Thynne Frederick d. 1705
unmarried
Henry Thynne; 1675–1708 | Thomas Thynne d. 1710
two daughters but no sons
Thomas Thynne; 1710–1751; 2nd Viscount Weymouth, etc., 3rd Baronet of Kempsford
Marquess of Bath, 1789 | Baron Carteret (2nd creation), 1784
Thomas Thynne; 1734–1796; 1st Marquess of Bath, 3rd Viscount Weymouth, etc., 4th Baronet of Kempsford | Henry Frederick Carteret; 1735–1826; 1st Baron Carteret
Thomas Thynne; 1765–1837; 2nd Marquess of Bath, 4th Viscount Weymouth, etc., 5th Baronet of Kempsford | George Thynne; 1770–1838; 2nd Baron Carteret | John Thynne; 1772–1849; 3rd Baron Carteret
Carteret barony extinct, 1849
Henry Frederick Thynne 1797–1837; 3rd Marquess of Bath, 5th Viscount Weymouth, etc., 6th Baronet of Kempsford | Edward Thynne; 1807–1884 | Charlotte Anne Thynne; 1811–1895 marr.: Walter Montagu Douglas Scott, Duke of Buccleuch and had issue.
John Alexander Thynne; 1831–1896; 4th Marquess of Bath, 6th Viscount Weymouth, etc., 7th Baronet of Kempsford | Henry "Harry" Frederick Thynne; 1832–1904
Thomas Henry Thynne; 1862–1946; 5th Marquess of Bath, 7th Viscount Weymouth, etc., 8th Baronet of Kempsford | Ulric Oliver Thynne; 1871–1957
Henry Frederick Thynne; 1905–1992; 6th Marquess of Bath, 8th Viscount Weymouth, etc., 9th Baronet of Kempsford
Thomas Timothy Thynne; 1929–1930 | Alexander George Thynn; 1930–2020; 7th Marquess of Bath, 9th Viscount Weymouth, etc., 10th Baronet of Kempsford | Christopher John Thynne; 1934–2017 | Valentine Charles Thynne; 1937–1979
Ceawlin Henry Laszlo Thynn b. 1974; 8th Marquess of Bath, 10th Viscount Weymouth, etc., 11th Baronet of Kempsford | Lucien Henry Valentine Thynne b. 1965
John Alexander Ladi Thynn b. 2014 styled Viscount Weymouth
Heir apparent to the Marquess of Bath

Parliament of Great Britain
| Preceded by Andrew Bayntun-Rolt; John Scott | Member of Parliament for Weobley; 1786–1790; With: John Scott | Succeeded by John Scott; Lord George Thynne |
| Preceded by Abel Moysey; John Pratt | Member of Parliament for Bath; 1790–1796; With: John Pratt 1780–1794; Sir Richard Arden 1794–1796 | Succeeded by Sir Richard Arden; Lord John Thynne |
Honorary titles
| Preceded by The Earl Poulett | Lord Lieutenant of Somerset; 1819–1837 | Succeeded by The Earl of Ilchester |
Peerage of Great Britain
| Preceded by Thomas Thynne | Marquess of Bath; 1796–1837 | Succeeded by Henry Thynne |
