= Thomas Thynne, 1st Viscount Weymouth =

British peer

The Right Honourable The Viscount Weymouth FRS PC
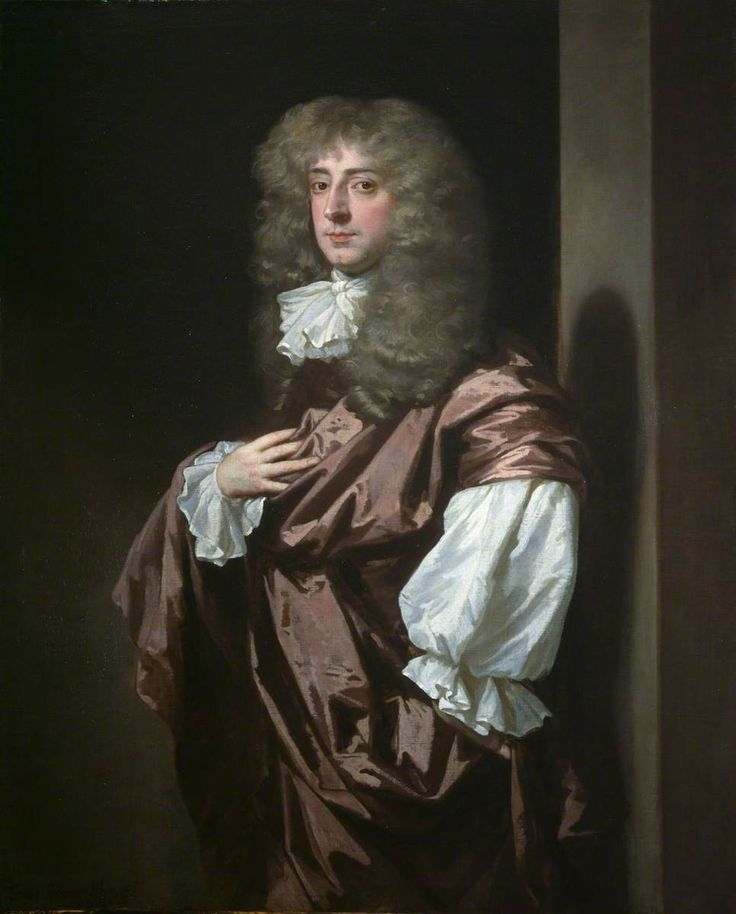
- Portrait of Sir Thomas Thynne, later 1st Viscount Weymouth, c.1675 by Peter Lely

President of the Board of Trade
- In office 8 January 1702 – 1705
- Preceded by: The Earl of Stamford
- Succeeded by: The Earl of Stamford

Personal details
- Born: 1640
- Died: 28 July 1714 (aged 73–74)
- Spouse: Lady Frances Finch

Thomas Thynne, 1st Viscount Weymouth (1640 – 28 July 1714) was an English politician who served as president of the Board of Trade from 1702 to 1705.

Thynne was the English Envoy to Sweden from 1666 to 1669, one of the Members of Parliament for Oxford University between 1674 and 1679, one of the Members for Tamworth from 1679 to 1681, the High Steward of Tamworth and High Steward of Sutton Coldfield from 1679 until his death. In 1682, he was created 1st Viscount Weymouth and the 1st Baron Thynne of Warminster. He served as First Lord of Trade and Foreign Plantations between 30 May 1702 and April 1707. He was a Privy Counsellor from 1702 to 1707 and was re-invested as a Privy Counsellor in 1711. He also held the office of Warden of the Forest of Dean in 1712. Predeceased by his sons, on his death, his estates and titles were inherited by his great-nephew, Thomas Thynne, 2nd Viscount Weymouth.

== Early life and education ==
Thynne was born in 1640, the son of Sir Henry Frederick Thynne of Caus Castle, Shropshire, and Kempsford, Gloucestershire, and his wife, Mary, daughter of Thomas Coventry, 1st Baron Coventry of Aylesborough. He was descended from the first Sir John Thynne of Longleat House.

He was educated at Kingston Grammar School and entered Christ Church, Oxford on 21 April 1657.

== Career ==
Thynne was invested as a Fellow of the Royal Society on 23 November 1664. He held the office of Envoy to Sweden between November 1666 and April 1669.

He was returned as Member of Parliament (M.P.) for Oxford University between 1674 and 1679 and for Tamworth between 1679 and 1681. He succeeded to the title of 2nd Baronet Thynne, of Kempsford on 6 March 1679. He was High Steward of Tamworth from 1679 and also High Steward of the Royal Town of Sutton Coldfield from 1679 until his death.

In 1682, he inherited the Longleat estates on the death of a cousin, Thomas Thynne. He was created 1st Viscount Weymouth, on 11 December 1682, with a special remainder; if he lacked male heirs among his own descendants, the title would be inherited by his two brothers, James and Henry Frederick. He was created 1st Baron Thynne of Warminster on 11 December 1682. On 13 December 1688, Weymouth carried an invitation to William III, Prince of Orange at Henley-on-Thames, along with Thomas Herbert, 8th Earl of Pembroke, after the flight of King James II in the Glorious Revolution.

He held the office of First Lord of Trade and Foreign Plantations between 30 May 1702 and April 1707. In this role, Weymouth is reputed to have introduced the Lord Weymouth Pine (Pinus strobus), in 1705. He planted it extensively on the estate at Longleat. The Lord Weymouth Pine was useful for ship masts, in that it grew tall and slender. Weymouth's reputation in connection to the pine is doubtful, since the name really derived from the explorer George Weymouth, totally unrelated, who first discovered this pine growing in colonial Maine. All Thomas Thynne did was to arrange for its importation, and prefix a "Lord" in front of the Weymouth in the tree's official appellation.

He was invested as a Privy Counsellor (P.C.) on 18 June 1702. In May 1707, at the time of the formation of the new Kingdom of Great Britain, Weymouth was relieved of the role of Privy Counsellor.

He held the office of Warden of the Forest of Dean in 1712. He was re-invested as a Privy Counsellor (P.C.) on 8 March 1711.

William Legge, 1st Earl of Dartmouth wrote that "Lord Weymouth was a weak, proud man, with a vast estate... He was very liberal to non-jurors, though he always took the oaths himself; which occasioned his house being constantly full of people of that sort, who cried him up for a very religious man; which pleased him extremely, having affected to be thought so all his life; which the companions of his youth would by no means allow."

== Personal life ==
Thynne married Lady Frances Finch, the daughter of Heneage Finch, 3rd Earl of Winchilsea and Lady Mary Seymour, sometime 1672. Their children included Henry, Thomas and Frances, who became the wife of Sir Robert Worsley, 4th Baronet. However, none of the children outlived their parents.

Thynne succeeded his father as 2nd Baronet Thynne of Kempsford on 6 March 1679.

Thomas suffered from bouts of ill health. In fact, in 1667, he was laid low with the gout and never expected to recover. However, he managed to outlive all his male relatives, both his own and the succeeding generation, leaving him sadly without any grandsons from male issue.

It was rumoured that he was twice offered an earldom during his final years. Yet without having any sons and with the inheritance of Longleat required by family entail to pass through the male line of descent from Sir John Thynne, he didn't really feel there was much point in accumulating any additional honours. He believe the line would soon be extinct or distant relatives too remove to trouble him. He had had four sons, including Henry Thynne (1675–1708), all of whom predeceased him.

Thynne's sister, Katherine Lowther was an electoral patron.

Family tree summary for the Thynnes of Longleat from about 1500

Ralph Botevile
Thomas Thynne	William Thynne d. 1546
John Thynne of Longleat alias Boteville c. 1515–1580	Francis Thynne c. 1544–1608
John Thynne of Longleat; 1555–1604	Charles Thynne c. 1568–1652
Thomas Thynne of Longleat c. 1578–1639
Baronet of Caus Castle, of Kempsford in the County of Gloucester, 1641
James of Longleat; 1605–1670	Thomas of Richmond d. 1669	Henry Frederick Thynne; 1615–1680; 1st Baronet of Kempsford
Baron Thynne, 1680; Viscount Weymouth, 1682
Thomas of Longleat; 1648–1682	Thomas Thynne; 1640–1714 inherited Longleat, 1682; 1st Viscount Weymouth, etc., 2nd Baronet of Kempsford	James Thynne of Buckland d. 1709	Henry Thynne Frederick d. 1705
unmarried
Henry Thynne; 1675–1708	Thomas Thynne d. 1710
two daughters but no sons
Thomas Thynne; 1710–1751; 2nd Viscount Weymouth, etc., 3rd Baronet of Kempsford
Marquess of Bath, 1789	Baron Carteret (2nd creation), 1784
Thomas Thynne; 1734–1796; 1st Marquess of Bath, 3rd Viscount Weymouth, etc., 4th Baronet of Kempsford	Henry Frederick Carteret; 1735–1826; 1st Baron Carteret
Thomas Thynne; 1765–1837; 2nd Marquess of Bath, 4th Viscount Weymouth, etc., 5th Baronet of Kempsford	George Thynne; 1770–1838; 2nd Baron Carteret	John Thynne; 1772–1849; 3rd Baron Carteret
Carteret barony extinct, 1849
Henry Frederick Thynne 1797–1837; 3rd Marquess of Bath, 5th Viscount Weymouth, etc., 6th Baronet of Kempsford	Edward Thynne; 1807–1884	Charlotte Anne Thynne; 1811–1895 marr.: Walter Montagu Douglas Scott, Duke of Buccleuch and had issue.
John Alexander Thynne; 1831–1896; 4th Marquess of Bath, 6th Viscount Weymouth, etc., 7th Baronet of Kempsford	Henry "Harry" Frederick Thynne; 1832–1904
Thomas Henry Thynne; 1862–1946; 5th Marquess of Bath, 7th Viscount Weymouth, etc., 8th Baronet of Kempsford	Ulric Oliver Thynne; 1871–1957
Henry Frederick Thynne; 1905–1992; 6th Marquess of Bath, 8th Viscount Weymouth, etc., 9th Baronet of Kempsford
Thomas Timothy Thynne; 1929–1930	Alexander George Thynn; 1930–2020; 7th Marquess of Bath, 9th Viscount Weymouth, etc., 10th Baronet of Kempsford	Christopher John Thynne; 1934–2017	Valentine Charles Thynne; 1937–1979
Ceawlin Henry Laszlo Thynn b. 1974; 8th Marquess of Bath, 10th Viscount Weymouth, etc., 11th Baronet of Kempsford	Lucien Henry Valentine Thynne b. 1965
John Alexander Ladi Thynn b. 2014 styled Viscount Weymouth
Heir apparent to the Marquess of Bath

== Viscountcy of Weymouth ==
Thynne succeeded his father as 2nd Baronet Thynne of Kempsford on 6 March 1679.

Thynne was predeceased by all of his sons and grandsons. On his death, his estates and titles were inherited by his great nephew, Thomas Thynne, 2nd Viscount Weymouth.

The Viscountcy of Weymouth has been held by the Marquesses of Bath since 18 Jun 1789.

== Lord Weymouth School (Warminster School) ==
See also Warminster School.

In 1707, Thomas Thynne founded a grammar school for boys in the nearby market town of Warminster, with 23 free places for local boys. The first Master was Rev R. Barry. Over time this became known as the Lord Weymouth School.

In 1973, this school merged with St Monica's Girls' School to become Warminster School which continues to this day. Thynne is remembered at the school by the naming of a boarding house after him, which was later converted to classrooms. A strong link remains between the school and his successors.

== Longleat House ==
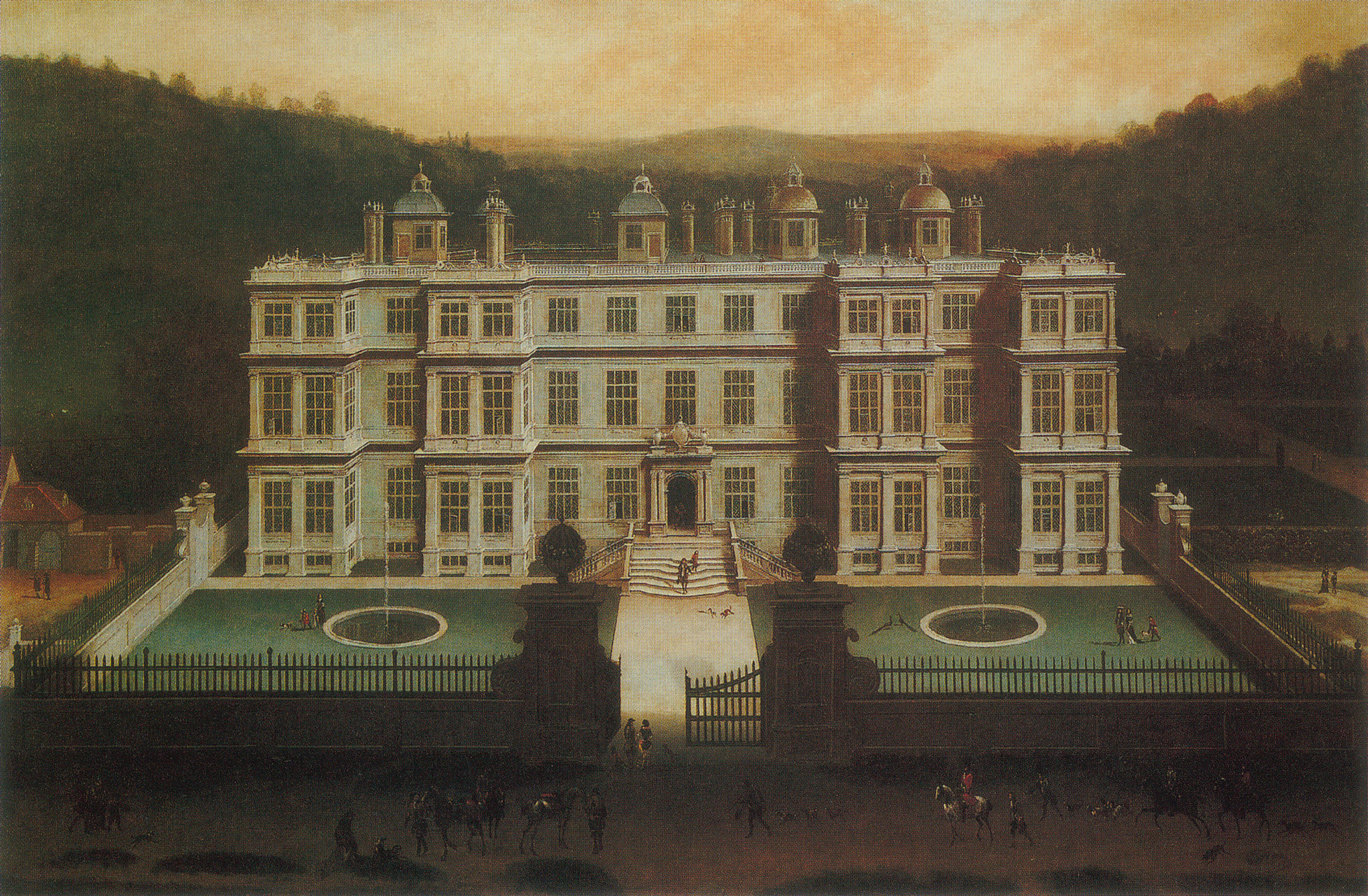
A View of Longleat, Jan Siberechts, 1675

Longleat had been the seat of the Thynn (Thynne) family since 1541, when the Augustinian priory was purchased by Sir John Thynn in 1541. The original house caught fire and burnt down in April 1567 and a replacement built by 1580.

Thynne started the house's large book collection and, inspired by Versailles, hired George London to enhance the house's gardens, build gardens, canals, fountains and parterres, and introduce sculptures by Arnold Quellin and Chevalier David. The gardens also include the hedge maze, the love labyrinth, the sun maze, the lunar labyrinth and King Arthur's maze added by the Alexander Thynn, 7th Marquess of Bath (1932–2020), who was an artist and mural painter.

== Bishop Ken, lodger ==
Thomas Ken was the Bishop of Bath and Wells. He and Thynne had been friends since they both studied at Oxford. When Ken, was deprived of his see by King William and Queen Mary in 1691, after he refused to transfer his oath of allegiance from King James, Thynne gave him lodgings at Longleat and an annuity of £80.

Ken lived on the top floor at Longleat for twenty off years and had a lot of influence with Thynne. Thynne describe Ken as his conscience and acquired a reputation for doing good deeds, which his friends believed were inspired by the Bishop, including the founding of the Lord Weymouth School, now Warminster School. A portion of the West Wing of Longleat was also converted into a chapel for the household's daily worship. While living at Longleat, Bishop Ken wrote many of his famous hymns, including "Awake my soul". When Ken died in 1711, he bequeathed his extensive library to Thynne.

== Irish estates ==
Thomas Thynne gained land in Northern Ireland following the division of land in 1692 which came out of an agreement between the heirs of the two daughters of Robert Devereux, 2nd Earl of Essex. Earl Ferrers, the grandson of Lady Dorothy inherited her share, and Thomas Thynne, 1st Viscount Weymouth succeeded to the inheritance of Lady Frances Devereux, the Earl's elder daughter, later Marchioness of Hertford and Duchess of Somerset. This division was uneven, and in Lord Weymouth's favour. Lord Weymouth, however, behaved generously in order to rectify this injustice to Ferrers.

In his "Longleat: the Story of an English Country House" (London, 1978), David Burnett records (somewhat improbably, but on the evidence of the Bath estate archive): '... In 1694 a Polish baron had written to Thomas Thynne, 1st Viscount Weymouth asking if he could lease 4,000 acres (16 km^{2}) and the Irish estate town of Carrickmacross in order to settle 200 Protestant families from Silesia. Thomas consented, but the agreement was cancelled when the baron announced his intention to demolish the town and rebuild it in the Polish style."

Thomas Thynne sent his Irish agent instructions for building the Viscount Weymouth Grammar School, Carrickmacross. "I intend the school house shall be slated and made a convenient house, which will draw scholars and benefit the town; therefore the timber must be oak." But Thomas was an absentee landlord, and ten years elapsed before he discovered that his agent has embezzled the building fund and repaired an existing building. The school was eventually built, and its syllabus included "Oratory, Virtue, Surveying [and] Antiquities". The stern language of its ninth statute stated: "The master shall make diligent enquiry after such as shall break, cut or deface or anywise abuse the desks, forms, walls or windows of this school, and shall always inflict open punishment on all such offenders". Unlike Warminster School this school closed in 1955.

The 1st Viscount Weymouth died in 1714, without surviving male issue, and bequeathed his estates to his grand-nephew, also named Thomas Thynne, and ancestor of the Marquesses of Bath. Robert Shirley, 1st Earl Ferrers died in 1717, his estate, by agreement, devolving in equal parts to his four sons: Robert, George, Sewallis and John Shirley. Of these, only George survived and, as the others had died without issue, the whole estate passed to him. He was the grandfather of the Shirley brothers, Horatio Henry and Evelyn Philip, the 19th-century owners of the western moiety of Farney. The Shirleys were absentees, spending most of their time at Ettington in Warwickshire. In c.1750, they built a house near Carrickmacross for their occasional visits. It was not until 1826 that Robert's grandson, Evelyn John Shirley, laid the foundations of a mansion worthy of the family and estate near the banks of Lough Fea.

Parliament of England
Preceded by Laurence Hyde; Sir Heneage Finch, Bt	Member of Parliament for Oxford University; 1674–1679; With: Laurence Hyde	Succeeded by Laurence Hyde; Heneage Finch
Preceded by John Swinfen; Lord Clifford	Member of Parliament for Tamworth; 1679–1681; With: John Swinfen 1679, 1681–1685; Sir Andrew Hacket 1679–1681	Succeeded by Richard Howe; Sir Henry Gough
Political offices
Preceded by The Earl of Stamford	President of the Board of Trade; 1702–1707	Succeeded by The Earl of Stamford
Honorary titles
Preceded by Sir Richard Newdigate, Bt	High Steward of Sutton Coldfield; 1679–1714	Succeeded by The Lord Middleton
Preceded by The Earl of Pembroke	Custos Rotulorum of Wiltshire; 1683–1688	Succeeded by The Earl of Yarmouth
Preceded by The Earl of Yarmouth	Custos Rotulorum of Wiltshire; 1690–1706	Succeeded by The Earl of Kingston-upon-Hull
Preceded by The Marquess of Dorchester	Custos Rotulorum of Wiltshire; 1711–1714	Succeeded by The Marquess of Dorchester
Peerage of England
New creation	Viscount Weymouth; 1682–1714	Succeeded by Thomas Thynne
New creation	Baron Thynne; 1680–1714	Succeeded by Thomas Thynne
Baronetage of England
Preceded by Henry Thynne	Baronet (of Cause Castle); 1680–1714	Succeeded by Thomas Thynne
