= Marquess of Bath =

Title in the Peerage of Great Britain

Marquessate of Bath
- Arms: Quarterly: 1st and 4th, Barry of ten Or and Sable (Botteville); 2nd and 3rd, Argent, a Lion rampant with tail nowed and erect Gules (Thynne). Crest: A Reindeer statant Or. Supporters: Dexter: A Reindeer Or, gorged with a plain Collar Sable. Sinister: A Lion with tail nowed and erect Gules.
- Creation date: 18 August 1789
- Created by: King George III
- Peerage: Peerage of Great Britain
- First holder: Thomas Thynne, 3rd Viscount Weymouth
- Present holder: Ceawlin Thynn, 8th Marquess of Bath
- Heir apparent: John Thynn, Viscount Weymouth
- Remainder to: 1st Marquess' heirs male of the body lawfully begotten
- Subsidiary titles: Viscount Weymouth; Baron Thynne; Baronet 'of Caus Castle'
- Status: Extant
- Seat: Longleat
- Motto: J'AY BONNE CAUSE (I have good reason)

Marquess of Bath is a title in the Peerage of Great Britain. It was created in 1789 for Thomas Thynne, 3rd Viscount Weymouth. The Marquess holds the subsidiary titles Baron Thynne, of Warminster in the County of Wiltshire, and Viscount Weymouth, both created in 1682 in the Peerage of England. He is also a baronet in the Baronetage of England.

== Family history until 1800 ==
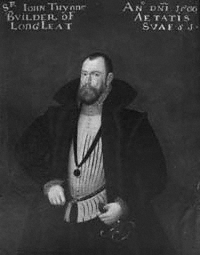
Sir John Thynne (died 1580)

The Thynne family descends from the soldier and courtier Sir John Thynne (died 1580), who constructed Longleat House between 1567 and 1579. In 1641 his great-grandson Henry Frederick Thynne was created a Baronet, of Caus Castle, in the Baronetage of England (some sources claim that the territorial designation is "Kempsford in the County of Gloucester"). He was succeeded by his son, the second Baronet. He represented Oxford University and Tamworth in the House of Commons and also served as Envoy to Sweden. In 1682 he was raised to the Peerage of England as Baron Thynne, of Warminster in the County of Wilts, and Viscount Weymouth, in the County of Dorset, with remainder to his younger brothers James Thynne (who died unmarried) and Henry Frederick Thynne and the heirs male of their bodies.

Lord Weymouth died without surviving male issue in 1714 (one of his three sons, the Honourable Henry Thynne, represented Weymouth and Melcombe Regis and Tamworth in Parliament but had died in 1708, leaving only daughters) and was succeeded in the peerages (according to the special remainders) by his great-nephew, the second Viscount. He was the grandson of the aforementioned Henry Frederick Thynne, brother of the first Viscount. He married as his second wife Lady Louisa Carteret, daughter of John, Earl Granville, a female-line grandson of John, 1st Earl of Bath of the second creation (a title which had become extinct in 1711). Lord Weymouth was succeeded by his eldest son, the third Viscount. He was a prominent statesman and served as Secretary of State for the Northern Department and as Secretary of State for the Southern Department. In 1789 the Bath title held by his ancestors was revived when he was created Marquess of Bath. Unusually, the Earldom of Bath was revived during the Marquess's lifetime for Laura Pulteney, the heiress of the Earl of Bath of the fourth creation. Place names used by existing peerages are normally avoided when new ones are created. This earldom went extinct on her death in 1808.

=== Family history 1800–present ===
The 1st Marquess's son Thomas, the 2nd Marquess, sat as Tory Member of Parliament for Weobley and Bath and served as Lord-Lieutenant of Somerset. His eldest son Thomas, represented Weobley in Parliament but predeceased his father by two months. Lord Bath was therefore succeeded by his second son Henry, the 3rd Marquess, who died three months later. He was a captain in the Royal Navy and also sat as Member of Parliament for Weobley. His son John, the 4th Marquess, succeeded at age six; he was Chairman of the Wiltshire County Council and Lord-Lieutenant of Wiltshire. He was succeeded by his eldest son Thomas, the 5th Marquess. He was a Conservative politician and served briefly as Under-Secretary of State for India in 1895. His second but eldest surviving son Henry, the 6th Marquess, represented Frome in the House of Commons as a Conservative.

The 6th Marquess's second son, Alexander, the 7th Marquess, succeeded in 1992. He was a well-known politician, author and artist. In 2015 the Times described him as "a steaming pile of ancient kaftans and one of our wuffliest and weirdest mad-hatter aristocrats. He is best known for swanning around Longleat, his enormous Elizabethan pad in Wiltshire, entertaining his 75 concubines, or as he called them, "wifelets". The wifelets have included former Bond girls and Sri Lankan teenagers, as well as housewives and, according to some, prostitutes. The deal is simple: the wifelets get to hang out with Lord Bath in a jewel of a palace and in return he gets unlimited sex."

The titles are currently held by Ceawlin Thynn, the son of the 7th Marquess.

== Other family members ==
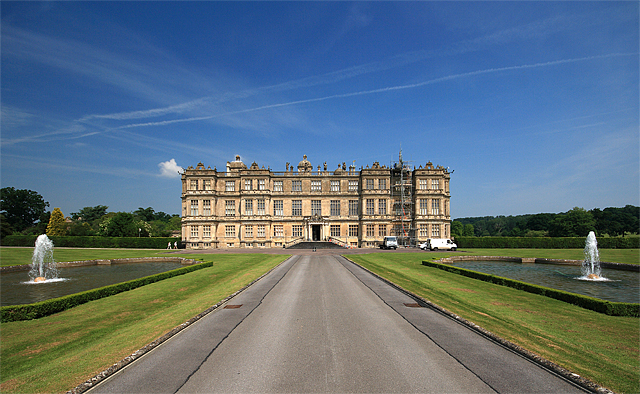
Longleat, seat of the Thynnes

The Honourable Henry Thynne, second son of the second Viscount, succeeded to the Carteret estates through his mother and assumed the surname of Carteret in lieu of Thynne. In 1784 he was created Baron Carteret with remainder to the younger sons of his brother the first Marquess of Bath (see the Baron Carteret for more information on this title). Several other members of the Thynne family have also gained distinction. The Reverend Lord John Thynne, third son of the second Marquess, was sub-Dean of Westminster Abbey; his seventh son was Major-General Sir Reginald Thomas Thynne (1843–1926). Lord Henry Thynne, second son of the third Marquess, was a Conservative politician and notably served as Treasurer of the Household from 1875 to 1880. Lord Alexander Thynne, third son of the fourth Marquess, represented Bath in the House of Commons from 1910 to 1918.

The family seat is Longleat House.

== Coat of arms ==
The arms borne by the Thynne family are: Quarterly: 1st and 4th, barry of ten Or and Sable (Botteville); 2nd and 3rd, Argent, a lion rampant with tail nowed and erected Gules (Thynne). This can be translated as: a shield divided into quarters, the top left and bottom right made of ten horizontal bars alternating gold and black (for the Boteville family); the top right and bottom left quarters white with a red lion rampant with a knotted tail (for the Thynne family).

== Early Thynnes of Longleat ==
- Sir John Thynne the Elder (1515–1580), the builder of Longleat
- Sir John Thynne the Younger (1555–1604), son of Sir John Thynne the Elder
- Sir Thomas Thynne (ca. 1578–1639), son of Sir John Thynne the Younger
- Sir James Thynne (1605–1670), son of Sir Thomas Thynne
- Thomas Thynne (1648–1682), nephew of Sir James Thynne, grandson of Sir Thomas Thynne

== Thynne Baronets, of Caus Castle (1641) ==
- Sir Henry Frederick Thynne, 1st Baronet (1615–1680), son of Sir Thomas Thynne (ca. 1578–1639)
- Sir Thomas Thynne, 2nd Baronet (1640–1714) (created Viscount Weymouth in 1682)

== Viscounts Weymouth (1682) ==
- Thomas Thynne, 1st Viscount Weymouth (1640–1714)
  - The Hon. Henry Thynne (1675–1708)
- Thomas Thynne, 2nd Viscount Weymouth (1710–1751)
- Thomas Thynne, 3rd Viscount Weymouth (1734–1796) (created Marquess of Bath in 1789)

== Marquesses of Bath (1789) ==
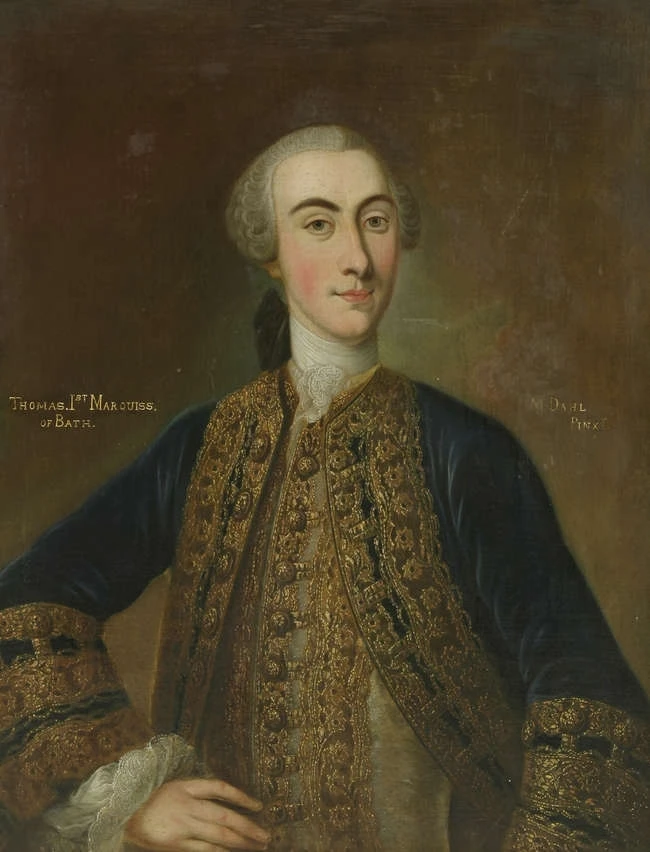
Thomas Thynne, 1st Marquess of Bath.

- Thomas Thynne, 1st Marquess of Bath (1734–1796)
- Thomas Thynne, 2nd Marquess of Bath (1765–1837)
- Henry Frederick Thynne, 3rd Marquess of Bath (1797–1837)
- John Alexander Thynne, 4th Marquess of Bath (1831–1896)
- Thomas Henry Thynne, 5th Marquess of Bath (1862–1946)
- Henry Frederick Thynne, 6th Marquess of Bath (1905–1992)
- Alexander George Thynn, 7th Marquess of Bath (1932–2020)
- Ceawlin Henry Laszlo Thynn, 8th Marquess of Bath (b. 1974)

The heir apparent is the 8th Marquess' son, John Alexander Ladi Thynn, Viscount Weymouth (b. 2014).

== Family tree ==
Family tree summary for the Thynnes of Longleat from about 1500

Ralph Botevile
Thomas Thynne	William Thynne d. 1546
John Thynne of Longleat alias Boteville c. 1515–1580	Francis Thynne c. 1544–1608
John Thynne of Longleat; 1555–1604	Charles Thynne c. 1568–1652
Thomas Thynne of Longleat c. 1578–1639
Baronet of Caus Castle, of Kempsford in the County of Gloucester, 1641
James of Longleat; 1605–1670	Thomas of Richmond d. 1669	Henry Frederick Thynne; 1615–1680; 1st Baronet of Kempsford
Baron Thynne, 1680; Viscount Weymouth, 1682
Thomas of Longleat; 1648–1682	Thomas Thynne; 1640–1714 inherited Longleat, 1682; 1st Viscount Weymouth, etc., 2nd Baronet of Kempsford	James Thynne of Buckland d. 1709	Henry Thynne Frederick d. 1705
unmarried
Henry Thynne; 1675–1708	Thomas Thynne d. 1710
two daughters but no sons
Thomas Thynne; 1710–1751; 2nd Viscount Weymouth, etc., 3rd Baronet of Kempsford
Marquess of Bath, 1789	Baron Carteret (2nd creation), 1784
Thomas Thynne; 1734–1796; 1st Marquess of Bath, 3rd Viscount Weymouth, etc., 4th Baronet of Kempsford	Henry Frederick Carteret; 1735–1826; 1st Baron Carteret
Thomas Thynne; 1765–1837; 2nd Marquess of Bath, 4th Viscount Weymouth, etc., 5th Baronet of Kempsford	George Thynne; 1770–1838; 2nd Baron Carteret	John Thynne; 1772–1849; 3rd Baron Carteret
Carteret barony extinct, 1849
Henry Frederick Thynne 1797–1837; 3rd Marquess of Bath, 5th Viscount Weymouth, etc., 6th Baronet of Kempsford	Edward Thynne; 1807–1884	Charlotte Anne Thynne; 1811–1895 marr.: Walter Montagu Douglas Scott, Duke of Buccleuch and had issue.
John Alexander Thynne; 1831–1896; 4th Marquess of Bath, 6th Viscount Weymouth, etc., 7th Baronet of Kempsford	Henry "Harry" Frederick Thynne; 1832–1904
Thomas Henry Thynne; 1862–1946; 5th Marquess of Bath, 7th Viscount Weymouth, etc., 8th Baronet of Kempsford	Ulric Oliver Thynne; 1871–1957
Henry Frederick Thynne; 1905–1992; 6th Marquess of Bath, 8th Viscount Weymouth, etc., 9th Baronet of Kempsford
Thomas Timothy Thynne; 1929–1930	Alexander George Thynn; 1930–2020; 7th Marquess of Bath, 9th Viscount Weymouth, etc., 10th Baronet of Kempsford	Christopher John Thynne; 1934–2017	Valentine Charles Thynne; 1937–1979
Ceawlin Henry Laszlo Thynn b. 1974; 8th Marquess of Bath, 10th Viscount Weymouth, etc., 11th Baronet of Kempsford	Lucien Henry Valentine Thynne b. 1965
John Alexander Ladi Thynn b. 2014 styled Viscount Weymouth
Heir apparent to the Marquess of Bath

== Line of succession ==
Line of succession (simplified)
- Thomas Thynne, 2nd Marquess of Bath (1765–1837)
  - Henry Thynne, 3rd Marquess of Bath (1797–1837)
    - John Thynne, 4th Marquess of Bath (1831–1896)
      - Thomas Thynne, 5th Marquess of Bath (1862–1946)
        - Henry Thynne, 6th Marquess of Bath (1905–1992)
          - Alexander Thynn, 7th Marquess of Bath (1932–2020)
            - Ceawlin Thynn, 8th Marquess of Bath (b. 1974)
              - (1). John Alexander Ladi Thynn, Viscount Weymouth (b. 2014)
              - (-) Lord Henry Richard Isaac Thynn (b. 2016)
          - Lord Valentine Charles Thynne (1937–1979)
            - (2). Lucien Henry Valentine Thynne (b. 1965)
    - Lord Henry Thynne (1832–1904)
      - Ulric Oliver Thynne (1871–1957)
        - Oliver St. Maur Thynne (1901–1978)
          - Sheridan Ulric Thynne (1939–2011)
            - (3). Piers Mark Thynn (b. 1977)
              - (4). Archie Jack Thynn (b. 2011)
              - (5). Jasper Oliver Thynn (b. 2011)
  - Lord John Thynne (1798–1881)
    - Francis John Thynne (1830–1910)
      - George Augustus Carteret Thynne (1869–1945)
        - John Granville Thynne (1917–2001)
          - male issue in remainder

== See also ==
- Marchioness of Bath
- Earl of Bath (1661 creation)
- Baron Carteret (1784 creation)
- Earl Granville
