= Thomas Thynne, 5th Marquess of Bath =

English politician (1862–1946)

The Most Honourable The Marquess of Bath KG CB PC JP
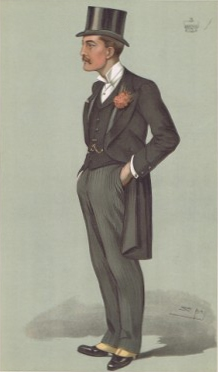
- "Frome". Lord Bath as caricatured by Spy (Leslie Ward) in Vanity Fair, April 1896.

Under-Secretary of State for India
- In office 20 January 1905 – 4 December 1905
- Monarch: Edward VII
- Prime Minister: Arthur Balfour
- Preceded by: Earl Percy
- Succeeded by: John Ellis

Master of the Horse
- In office 20 November 1922 – 22 January 1924
- Monarch: George V
- Prime Minister: Bonar Law; Stanley Baldwin
- Preceded by: The Earl of Chesterfield
- Succeeded by: The Earl of Granard

Personal details
- Born: 15 July 1862 The Stable Yard, St James's, London
- Died: 9 June 1946 (aged 83)
- Party: Conservative
- Spouse: Violet Mordaunt (m. 1890; died 1928)
- Children: 5, including Henry
- Parents: John Thynne, 4th Marquess of Bath; The Hon. Frances Vesey
- Education: Balliol College, Oxford

Thomas Henry Thynne, 5th Marquess of Bath (15 July 1862 – 9 June 1946), styled Viscount Weymouth until 1896, was a British landowner and Conservative politician. He held ministerial office as Under-Secretary of State for India in 1905 and Master of the Horse between 1922 and 1924. He was also involved in local politics and served as Chairman of Wiltshire County Council between 1906 and his death in 1946.

== Background and education ==
Known from birth by the courtesy title of Viscount Weymouth, he was born at the Stable Yard, St James's, Westminster, the eldest son of John Thynne, 4th Marquess of Bath and the Honourable Frances Isabella Catherine Vesey, a daughter of Thomas Vesey, 3rd Viscount de Vesci. He was educated at Eton and Balliol College, Oxford, where he graduated BA in 1886, in 1888 promoted by seniority to MA.

== Political career ==
Lord Weymouth sat as Member of Parliament for Frome between 1886 and 1892 and from 1895 to 1896, when he succeeded his father in the marquessate and entered the House of Lords. He served under Arthur Balfour as Under-Secretary of State for India between January and December 1905. He was appointed Lord Lieutenant of Somerset in 1904 and Chairman of Wiltshire County Council in 1906, and held both posts simultaneously until his death in 1946.

Lord Bath was made a Knight Companion of the Garter in 1917. He returned to the government in 1922, when Bonar Law appointed him Master of the Horse. He was sworn of the Privy Council at the same time. He continued in this office until the Conservative government fell in January 1924, the last year under the premiership of Stanley Baldwin.

Lord Bath was a Lieutenant-Colonel in the Royal Wiltshire Yeomanry and Honorary Colonel of that regiment and of the 4th Battalion of the Somerset Light Infantry. In 1937 he was appointed Pro-Chancellor of Bristol University. He was a member of the Bath and County Club.

== Family ==
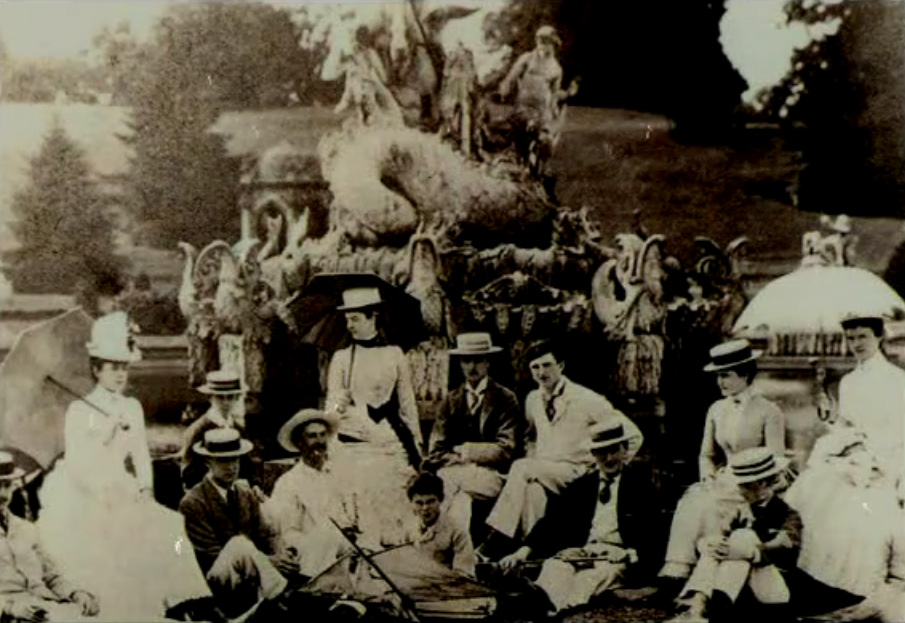
A house party at Witley Court in the late 1880s, the 5th Marquess of Bath seated 5th from right, next to Violet Mordaunt (daughter of Harriet Mordaunt) whom he later married

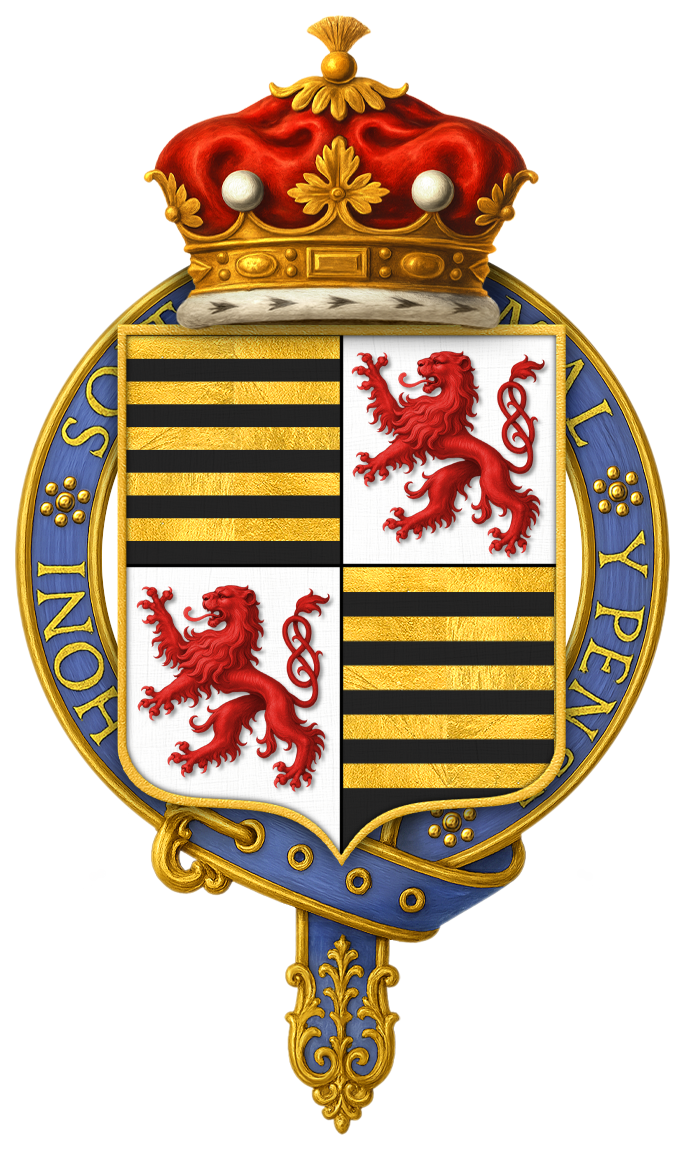
Garter-encircled shield of arms of Thomas Thynne, 5th Marquess of Bath, KG, as displayed on his Order of the Garter stall plate in St. George's Chapel.

On 19 April 1890, Lord Bath married Violet Caroline Mordaunt (28 February 1869 – 29 May 1928), daughter of Harriet, Lady Mordaunt. At the time of Violet's birth her mother had been the wife of Sir Charles Mordaunt, 10th Baronet, but she was said to be the illegitimate daughter of Viscount Cole, who was later co-respondent in a divorce action. They had five children:

- Lady Alice Kathleen Violet Thynne (1891–1977), married Lt-Col Oliver Stanley, son of Edward Stanley, 4th Baron Sheffield and had issue.
- Lady Emma Margery Thynne (1893–1980), married 1921 (div 1942) William Compton, 6th Marquess of Northampton; no issue.
- Second Lieutenant John Alexander Thynne, Viscount Weymouth (1895–1916), killed at Hulluch near Loos in northeastern France while on active service as a 2nd Lieutenant in the Royal Scots Greys. He is buried in the Vermelles British Cemetery.
- Lady Mary Beatrice Thynne (1903–1974), married firstly, in 1927, Charles Wilson, 3rd Baron Nunburnholme and had issue, including the 4th and 5th Barons. She married secondly, Ulick Alexander. She was a bridesmaid at the wedding of Prince Albert, Duke of York, and Lady Elizabeth Bowes-Lyon on 26 April 1923.
- Henry Frederick Thynne, 6th Marquess of Bath (1905–1992)

The Marchioness of Bath died in May 1928, aged 59. Lord Bath paid for the construction of a village hall at Horningsham, near the family seat at Longleat, as a memorial to her. He remained a widower until his death in June 1946, aged 83. He was succeeded by his second and only surviving son, Henry.

Family tree summary for the Thynnes of Longleat from about 1500

Ralph Botevile
Thomas Thynne	William Thynne d. 1546
John Thynne of Longleat alias Boteville c. 1515–1580	Francis Thynne c. 1544–1608
John Thynne of Longleat; 1555–1604	Charles Thynne c. 1568–1652
Thomas Thynne of Longleat c. 1578–1639
Baronet of Caus Castle, of Kempsford in the County of Gloucester, 1641
James of Longleat; 1605–1670	Thomas of Richmond d. 1669	Henry Frederick Thynne; 1615–1680; 1st Baronet of Kempsford
Baron Thynne, 1680; Viscount Weymouth, 1682
Thomas of Longleat; 1648–1682	Thomas Thynne; 1640–1714 inherited Longleat, 1682; 1st Viscount Weymouth, etc., 2nd Baronet of Kempsford	James Thynne of Buckland d. 1709	Henry Thynne Frederick d. 1705
unmarried
Henry Thynne; 1675–1708	Thomas Thynne d. 1710
two daughters but no sons
Thomas Thynne; 1710–1751; 2nd Viscount Weymouth, etc., 3rd Baronet of Kempsford
Marquess of Bath, 1789	Baron Carteret (2nd creation), 1784
Thomas Thynne; 1734–1796; 1st Marquess of Bath, 3rd Viscount Weymouth, etc., 4th Baronet of Kempsford	Henry Frederick Carteret; 1735–1826; 1st Baron Carteret
Thomas Thynne; 1765–1837; 2nd Marquess of Bath, 4th Viscount Weymouth, etc., 5th Baronet of Kempsford	George Thynne; 1770–1838; 2nd Baron Carteret	John Thynne; 1772–1849; 3rd Baron Carteret
Carteret barony extinct, 1849
Henry Frederick Thynne 1797–1837; 3rd Marquess of Bath, 5th Viscount Weymouth, etc., 6th Baronet of Kempsford	Edward Thynne; 1807–1884	Charlotte Anne Thynne; 1811–1895 marr.: Walter Montagu Douglas Scott, Duke of Buccleuch and had issue.
John Alexander Thynne; 1831–1896; 4th Marquess of Bath, 6th Viscount Weymouth, etc., 7th Baronet of Kempsford	Henry "Harry" Frederick Thynne; 1832–1904
Thomas Henry Thynne; 1862–1946; 5th Marquess of Bath, 7th Viscount Weymouth, etc., 8th Baronet of Kempsford	Ulric Oliver Thynne; 1871–1957
Henry Frederick Thynne; 1905–1992; 6th Marquess of Bath, 8th Viscount Weymouth, etc., 9th Baronet of Kempsford
Thomas Timothy Thynne; 1929–1930	Alexander George Thynn; 1930–2020; 7th Marquess of Bath, 9th Viscount Weymouth, etc., 10th Baronet of Kempsford	Christopher John Thynne; 1934–2017	Valentine Charles Thynne; 1937–1979
Ceawlin Henry Laszlo Thynn b. 1974; 8th Marquess of Bath, 10th Viscount Weymouth, etc., 11th Baronet of Kempsford	Lucien Henry Valentine Thynne b. 1965
John Alexander Ladi Thynn b. 2014 styled Viscount Weymouth
Heir apparent to the Marquess of Bath

Parliament of the United Kingdom
Preceded by Lawrence James Baker	Member of Parliament for Frome; 1886–1892	Succeeded by John Barlow
Preceded by John Barlow	Member of Parliament for Frome; 1895–1896	Succeeded by John Barlow
Political offices
Preceded by Earl Percy	Under-Secretary of State for India; January–December 1905	Succeeded by John Ellis
Preceded by The Earl of Chesterfield	Master of the Horse; 1922–1924	Succeeded by The Earl of Granard
Honorary titles
Preceded by The Earl of Cork	Lord Lieutenant of Somerset; 1904–1946	Succeeded by Sir James Somerville
Peerage of Great Britain
Preceded by John Thynne	Marquess of Bath; 1896–1946	Succeeded by Henry Thynne
