= John Thynne =

English steward and MP (c. 1515–1580)

Sir John Thynne
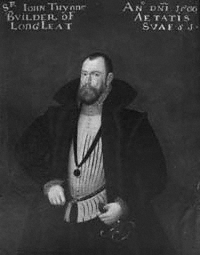
- Portrait of Thynne in 1566
- Born: c. 1515; Church Stretton, Shropshire
- Died: 21 May 1580; Longleat, Wiltshire
- Resting place: Longbridge Deverill
- Other name: John Boteville
- Occupation: Steward
- Employer: Edward Seymour, 1st Duke of Somerset
- Spouse(s): (1) Christiana Gresham, daughter of Sir Richard Gresham, Lord Mayor of London (2) Dorothy Wroughton, daughter of Sir William Wroughton, of Broad Hinton, Wiltshire
- Children: John, Dorothy, Anne, Francis, Thomas, Elizabeth, Catherine, Frances, Maria, Egremont, Henry, Charles, Edward, and William
- Parent(s): Thomas Thynne (alias Botteville) and Margaret Eynns, daughter of Thomas Eynns

Sir John Thynne (c. 1515 – 21 May 1580) was the steward to Edward Seymour, 1st Duke of Somerset (c. 1506 – 1552), and a member of parliament. He was the builder of Longleat House, and his descendants became Marquesses of Bath.

== Early life ==
Thynne's family also used the surname Boteville (or Botfield), so he was often called Thynne alias Boteville.

Thynne was born in Church Stretton, Shropshire, in 1515, and was the eldest son of Thomas Thynne, otherwise Botevile, and of his wife Margaret, a daughter of Thomas Eynns. His uncle William Thynne was a courtier in the household of King Henry VIII and a literary editor.

However, there is no other information about Thynne's youth, which may have been influenced by his uncle at court.

== Career ==
The first record of Thynne is in 1535, when he was in the service of Lord Vaux of Harrowden. In a surviving account book kept by Lord Vaux's steward, he is listed among forty-six people 'ordinary of Household' who attended Lord Vaux's family at Harrowden, Northamptonshire, between 2 August and 28 October 1535.

Between March and November 1538, Thynne, described as Lord Hertford's servant, brought an action in the Court of Chancery concerning the parsonage of Wilby, Northamptonshire, claiming he had wrongly been excluded from it by Lord Vaux.

In 1536, Thynne became steward to Edward Seymour, 1st Viscount Beauchamp, during the short period when Seymour's sister Jane Seymour was the Queen of Henry VIII of England. Seymour was later Marquess of Hertford and Duke of Somerset. Thynne continued in his place as steward until Seymour's execution for treason in 1552.

Seymour built up great estates in London and the west of England, not least after he became Lord Protector of England and Duke of Somerset in 1547, while his nephew Edward VI was king. Thynne, a hard-working servant, prospered as his master did.

In 1542 and 1544, Thynne was with Seymour on military expeditions to the north. He was probably at the Battle of Solway Moss in 1542 and was knighted after the victory of the Battle of Pinkie Cleugh of 1547.

Also in 1547, Thynne became a freeman of the City of London and a member of the Worshipful Company of Mercers.

Before he had long been Seymour's steward, Thynne began to build up his own estates in the west of England and Oxfordshire. On 11 April 1539, he took a twenty-one-year lease of the rectory of Clawton in Devon, when he was described as a resident of London. His greatest prize was the former Carthusian Longleat Priory, together with land in three parishes on the borders of Wiltshire and Somerset, which he bought on his own account in 1540. Other possessions of the former priories of Longleat and Hinton Charterhouse were granted by the Crown to Seymour, who sold them to his steward Thynne on 25 June 1541. This made a substantial estate near to Seymour's own at Maiden Bradley. Beginning in 1546, Thynne spent more than thirty-five years building a great house at Longleat.

Thynne became member of parliament for Marlborough in 1545 (and perhaps also in 1539 and 1542), and for Salisbury in 1547. A historian of Marlborough, James Waylen, states that Thynne was twice member for Marlborough before 1545. This is supported by a bond for £33 from the Corporation of Marlborough which Thynne was holding in March 1544, roughly equal to his parliamentary wages of two shillings a day for the three sessions of the Parliament of 1539 and the first two sessions of the one of 1542. He was also sheriff of Somerset and Dorset for 1548–1549.

In 1549, he made a rich match in marrying Christiana, a daughter of Sir Richard Gresham.

The Duke of Somerset fell from power in 1549, and Thynne was twice imprisoned in the Tower of London. Somerset was arrested at Windsor on 11 October 1549, and on 13 October Thynne was sent to the Tower with William Grey, Sir Thomas Smith, Sir Michael Stanhope and Edward Wolf, these being described as the Duke's "principal instruments and counsellors... in the affairs of his ill government". In August 1550, he was pardoned and all his goods and offices were restored, but he was put into the Tower again on 16 October 1551. After Somerset's execution, like his other followers who were spared, Thynne lost his offices and much of his land, and he was heavily fined. He retired to Longleat and led a country life there.

Thynne responded to Queen Mary's orders of 19 July 1553, by proclaiming her queen at Warminster, where he was high steward, but under her reign he continued to live in Wiltshire.

When Queen Elizabeth I inherited the throne, many of Thynne's friends returned to power, and he was again able to expand his estates and to recover some of his offices.

Thynne was again a member of parliament, for Wiltshire in 1559, for Great Bedwyn in 1563, for Wiltshire again in 1571, and for Heytesbury in 1572. He was High Sheriff of Wiltshire for 1568–1569, and Custos rotulorum and a justice of the peace for Wiltshire from 1558–1559 until his death.

When he died in 1580, Thynne left manors in Wiltshire, Gloucestershire, Somerset and Oxfordshire, and property in the cities of London, Westminster, and Bristol. He was entombed in the parish church at Longbridge Deverill, Wiltshire. At his funeral, gowns were given to sixty poor men, mourning suits to sixty-one servants, and cloaks to a great many gentlemen; the funeral expenses came to £380, 8s & 3d.

== Building of Longleat ==
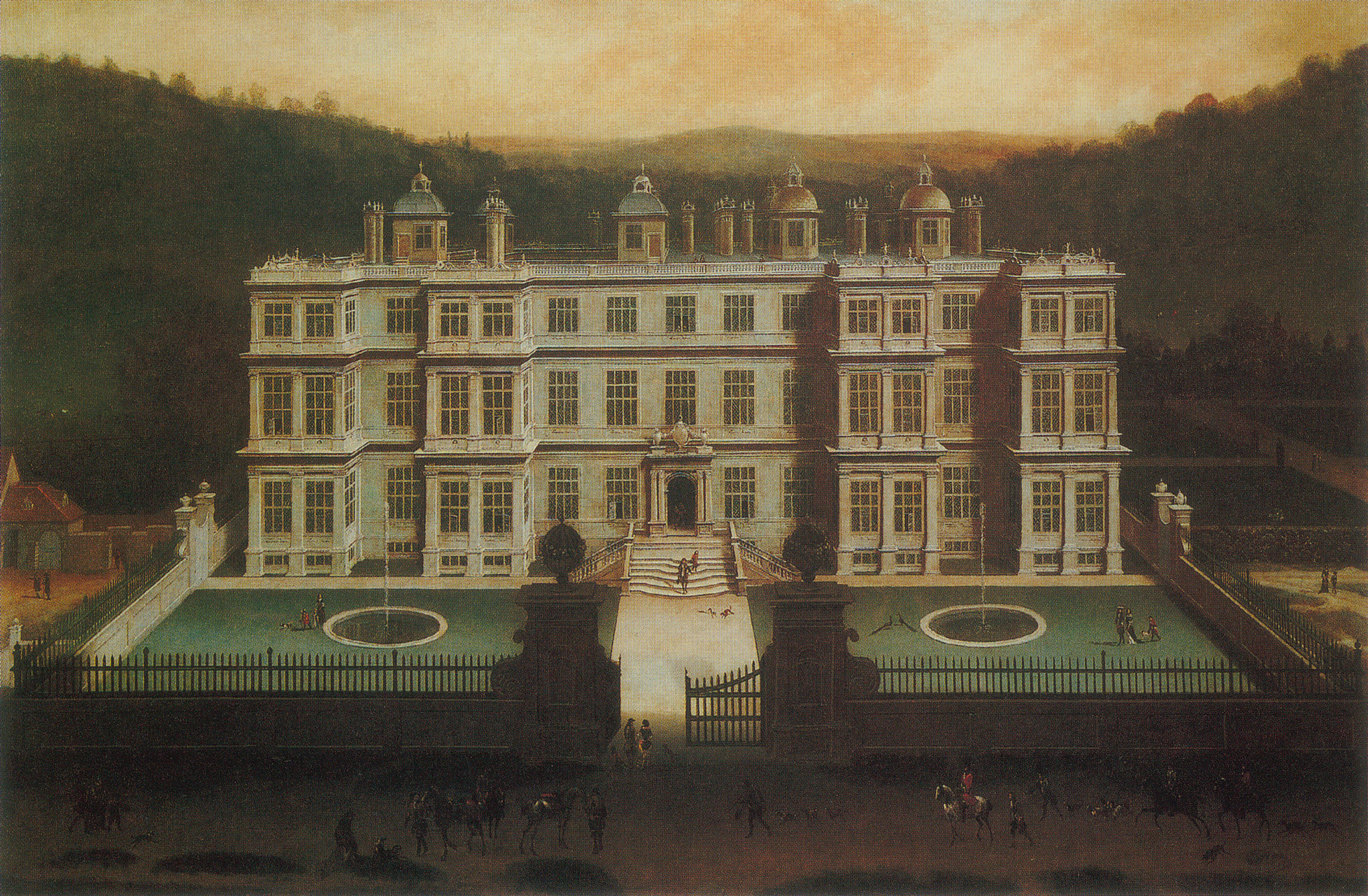
View of Longleat by Jan Siberechts, 1675

Thynne supervised Seymour's planned great house on a hill called Bedwyn Brail at Great Bedwyn in Wiltshire, intended to replace his ancestral seat of Wolf Hall. The house was unfinished when Seymour fell from power, but a correspondence survives, dated between November 1548 and June 1549, which shows Thynne directing the plans. He also played a part in the building of Seymour's Somerset House in London.

At Longleat, Thynne took thirty-seven years to design and build his own great neo-classical house with four facades, Doric, Ionic, and Corinthian pilasters, and regularly spaced bay windows. A perfectionist, he employed only the best craftsmen, including the English master mason and architect Robert Smythson and the French mason Alan Maynard. He suffered a setback in 1567, when there was a major fire at the house. However, during the long process of construction, Longleat became the centre of a new school of building. Smythson went on to design Hardwick Hall, Wollaton Hall, Burghley House, and Burton Agnes Hall, and is described by Mark Girouard in the Oxford Dictionary of National Biography as "the strongest architectural personality to have survived from the Elizabethan and Jacobean age".

== Marriages and issue ==
Thynne married twice:

- Firstly, in 1549, to Christiana Gresham, a daughter of Sir Richard Gresham and a sister of Sir Thomas Gresham, founder of the Royal Exchange. Their marriage settlement was signed in January 1549. By Christiana Gresham he had three sons and six daughters, including:
  - John Thynne (died 1604), eldest son and heir. He was knighted by King James I on 11 May 1603, four days after James arrived to take up the English crown. He married Joan Hayward, a daughter of Sir Rowland Hayward, twice Lord Mayor of London by his wife Joan Tyllsworth, daughter and heiress of Sir William Tyllsworth. Joan Hayward brought the Thynne family new estates in Shropshire and elsewhere.
  - Dorothy Thynne (buried 25 September 1592), wife of Sir John Strangways (c.1548-1593) of Melbury House, Melbury Sampford, Somerset, and of Abbotsbury in Dorset, Sheriff of Dorset. Their third son and eventual heir was Sir John Strangways (1585–1666), MP.
  - Anne Thynne, wife of John Cole;
  - Francis Thynne, who married Alice Knocker;
  - Thomas Thynne, who married Emily Bembridge;
  - Elizabeth Thynne, wife of John Chamberlayne;
  - Catherine Thynne, who married firstly Walter Long (1565–1610) and secondly Sir Edward Fox of Gwernigo, Mongomery, Wales.
  - Frances Thynne;
  - Maria Thynne.
- Secondly, in about 1566, after the death of his first wife, he married Dorothy Wroughton, a daughter of Sir William Wroughton, of Broad Hinton, by his wife Eleanor Lewknor. She survived her husband and married secondly Carew Raleigh of Downton House near Salisbury, a member of parliament for Downton in 1604, and the brother of Sir Walter Raleigh. By Dorothy Wroughton he had a further five sons:
  - Egremont Thynne, who married Barbara Calthorpe;
  - Henry Thynne, who married Elizabeth Chudleigh;
  - Charles Thynne;
  - Edward Thynne, who married Theodosia Manners;
  - William Thynne, who married Alice Talbot.

== Later descendants ==
In 1641 Thynne's great-grandson Henry Frederick Thynne (1615–1680) was created a baronet in the Baronetage of England, and in 1682 his son, Sir Thomas Thynne, 2nd Baronet, was created Viscount Weymouth. In 1789, Thomas Thynne, 3rd Viscount Weymouth (1734–1796) became the first of the Marquesses of Bath, a line which continues to the present-day Ceawlin Thynn, 8th Marquess of Bath (born 1974).

Family tree summary for the Thynnes of Longleat from about 1500

Ralph Botevile
Thomas Thynne | William Thynne d. 1546
John Thynne of Longleat alias Boteville c. 1515–1580 | Francis Thynne c. 1544–1608
John Thynne of Longleat; 1555–1604 | Charles Thynne c. 1568–1652
Thomas Thynne of Longleat c. 1578–1639
Baronet of Caus Castle, of Kempsford in the County of Gloucester, 1641
James of Longleat; 1605–1670 | Thomas of Richmond d. 1669 | Henry Frederick Thynne; 1615–1680; 1st Baronet of Kempsford
Baron Thynne, 1680; Viscount Weymouth, 1682
Thomas of Longleat; 1648–1682 | Thomas Thynne; 1640–1714 inherited Longleat, 1682; 1st Viscount Weymouth, etc., 2nd Baronet of Kempsford | James Thynne of Buckland d. 1709 | Henry Thynne Frederick d. 1705
unmarried
Henry Thynne; 1675–1708 | Thomas Thynne d. 1710
two daughters but no sons
Thomas Thynne; 1710–1751; 2nd Viscount Weymouth, etc., 3rd Baronet of Kempsford
Marquess of Bath, 1789 | Baron Carteret (2nd creation), 1784
Thomas Thynne; 1734–1796; 1st Marquess of Bath, 3rd Viscount Weymouth, etc., 4th Baronet of Kempsford | Henry Frederick Carteret; 1735–1826; 1st Baron Carteret
Thomas Thynne; 1765–1837; 2nd Marquess of Bath, 4th Viscount Weymouth, etc., 5th Baronet of Kempsford | George Thynne; 1770–1838; 2nd Baron Carteret | John Thynne; 1772–1849; 3rd Baron Carteret
Carteret barony extinct, 1849
Henry Frederick Thynne 1797–1837; 3rd Marquess of Bath, 5th Viscount Weymouth, etc., 6th Baronet of Kempsford | Edward Thynne; 1807–1884 | Charlotte Anne Thynne; 1811–1895 marr.: Walter Montagu Douglas Scott, Duke of Buccleuch and had issue.
John Alexander Thynne; 1831–1896; 4th Marquess of Bath, 6th Viscount Weymouth, etc., 7th Baronet of Kempsford | Henry "Harry" Frederick Thynne; 1832–1904
Thomas Henry Thynne; 1862–1946; 5th Marquess of Bath, 7th Viscount Weymouth, etc., 8th Baronet of Kempsford | Ulric Oliver Thynne; 1871–1957
Henry Frederick Thynne; 1905–1992; 6th Marquess of Bath, 8th Viscount Weymouth, etc., 9th Baronet of Kempsford
Thomas Timothy Thynne; 1929–1930 | Alexander George Thynn; 1930–2020; 7th Marquess of Bath, 9th Viscount Weymouth, etc., 10th Baronet of Kempsford | Christopher John Thynne; 1934–2017 | Valentine Charles Thynne; 1937–1979
Ceawlin Henry Laszlo Thynn b. 1974; 8th Marquess of Bath, 10th Viscount Weymouth, etc., 11th Baronet of Kempsford | Lucien Henry Valentine Thynne b. 1965
John Alexander Ladi Thynn b. 2014 styled Viscount Weymouth
Heir apparent to the Marquess of Bath

== Arms ==
Arms of Thynne

The arms of the head of the Thynne family of Longleat are blazoned "Quarterly, 1st and 4th: Barry of ten or and sable (Botteville); 2nd and 3rd: Argent, a lion rampant tail nowed and erect gules (Thynne)".

Political offices
| Preceded by Sir Richard Lyster | Custos Rotulorum of Wiltshire bef. 1558–1580 | Succeeded by The Earl of Pembroke |
