= Harriet Frances Bagot, Lady Thynne =

British novelist

Harriet Frances Bagot, Lady Thynne (26 July 1816 – 5 January 1881), also known as Lady Charles Thynne, was a British novelist.

Harriet Frances Bagot was born on 26 July 1816, the eldest daughter of Anglican Bishop Richard Bagot and Lady Harriet Villiers, daughter of George Villiers, 4th Earl of Jersey.

In 1837, she married the Rev. Charles Thynne, youngest child of Thomas Thynne, 2nd Marquess of Bath. Rev. Thynne served as Rector of Longbridge and Kingston Deverill, Wiltshire and Canon of Canterbury. Due to the influence of their friend John Henry Newman, she and her husband both converted to Catholicism in 1852. They had two children, Charles Ernest Thynne (26 February 1849 - 28 May 1906) and Gertrude Harriet Thynne (died 28 February 1913), who married Valentine Augustus Browne, 4th Earl of Kenmare.

Thynne wrote a number of romance novels, some with Catholic themes, and some Catholic-themed books for children.

Harriet Frances Bagot died on 5 January 1881 in London.

== Bibliography ==
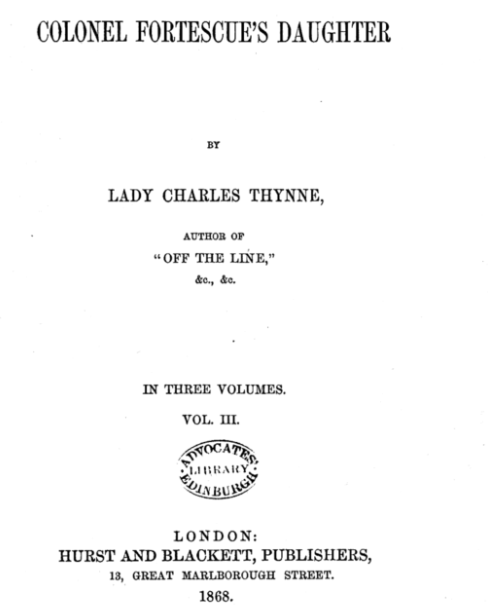
Colonel Fortescues Daughter - a Three-volume novel of 1868

- Eleanor Morrison: or, Home Duties. A Tale. 1 vol. Dublin: James Duffy, 1860.
- The Orange Girl: A Tale. 1 vol. Dublin: James Duffy, 1860.
- Charlcote Grange: A Tale. 1 vol. Dublin: James Duffy, 1861.
- Harry Morton's Trial. London, 1864.
- Off the Line. 2 vol. London: Hurst and Blackett, 1867.
- Colonel Fortescue's Daughter. 3 vol. London: Hurst and Blackett, 1868.
- Adventures of Mrs. Hardcastle. 3 vol. London: Hurst and Blackett, 1869.
- The Story of Herbert Archer. 1871.
- The Wanderer. 1871.
- Carry's Trials and Other Tales. 1875.
- Maud Leslie. 2 vol. London: Hurst and Blackett, 1877.
