= Thomas Thynne, Viscount Weymouth =

English nobleman and politician

Member of Parliament for Weobley
- In office 1818-1819

Personal details
- Born: 1796
- Died: 16 January 1837 (aged 40) Cucklington, Somerset, England
- Spouse: Harriet Robbins (m. 1820)
- Parent: Thomas Thynne (father)
- Relatives: Henry Thynne (brother); Edward Thynne (brother); Charlotte Scott (sister); George Byng (grandfather); Thomas Thynne (grandfather); John Thynne (uncle)
- Education: St John's College, Cambridge

Thomas Thynne, Viscount Weymouth (1796 – 16 January 1837) was an English nobleman, Member of Parliament for Weobley from 1818 to 1820.

== Life ==
He was the eldest son of Thomas Thynne, 2nd Marquess of Bath and his wife Isabella Elizabeth Byng, daughter of George Byng, 4th Viscount Torrington; he held a courtesy title, and since he predeceased his father, it was lifelong. He was educated at Eton College, and studied at St John's College, Cambridge from 1814 to 1816. After leaving Cambridge, he took on a junior diplomatic post with Richard Trench, 2nd Earl of Clancarty, on the continent of Europe; but Clancarty was not impressed with his ability.

In the 1818 United Kingdom general election, Viscount Weymouth stood for Weobley. This was a rotten borough, the family having obtained complete control of it in 1754. He was therefore elected uncontested, with Lord Frederick Cavendish-Bentinck, a nephew of the Marquess, as the second member. He supported Lord Liverpool's administration, without speaking in the House of Commons.

Weymouth did not stand again in the 1820 United Kingdom general election, by that time having clashed with his father over his friends and heavy debts. Lord John Thynne, his uncle, and the lawyer Henry Broughton, managed a reconciliation in February 1820, between the death of George III and the election it triggered, but it was only temporary. Weymouth's elopement took him abroad, in May.

There was no later reconciliation with his father, and indeed Weymouth brought a chancery suit against him in 1828. His mother the Marchioness did visit Weymouth and his wife Harriet in Paris, in 1830. He died on 16 January 1837, as a tenant at Shanks House, Cucklington on the Somerset–Dorset boundary, at age 40, five weeks before the Marquess. Thynne's library was sold at auction by Wheatley in London on 21 June 1837 (and three following days); a copy of the catalogue is held at Cambridge University Library (shelfmark Munby.c.154(12)).

== Family ==
Weymouth married on 11 May 1820 Harriet Matilda Robbins, daughter of Thomas Robbins. This was against his family's wishes, and they travelled first to Italy. After his death, she married again to Count Inghirami; she died at Florence on 18 June 1873. At the time of her death, she was described as the Hon. Enrichetta, Countess Inghirami (formerly Viscountess Weymouth).

It was considered a "disgraceful marriage", to the daughter of a toll keeper near Longleat, if a beauty. There is, however, conflicting evidence. A monumental inscription on Harriet's grave describes her as sister of the Rev. George Robbins (1812–1873), in accordance with information in Notes and Queries from 1909.

The Rev. George Robbins, who was English chaplain in Florence, is given in Alumni Oxonienses as son of "William, of West Bromwich, co. Stafford, gent." Having matriculated at Worcester College, Oxford in 1829, aged 17, he graduated B.A. at Magdalen College in 1831, M.A. in 1834. He was ordained deacon in 1832 and then priest in 1833 by Thomas Burgess, bishop of Salisbury. He was a chaplain in Tuscany from 1836 to 1850, then becoming rector of Courtenhall in 1851.
