= Longleat =

Stately home in Wiltshire, England

Longleat House
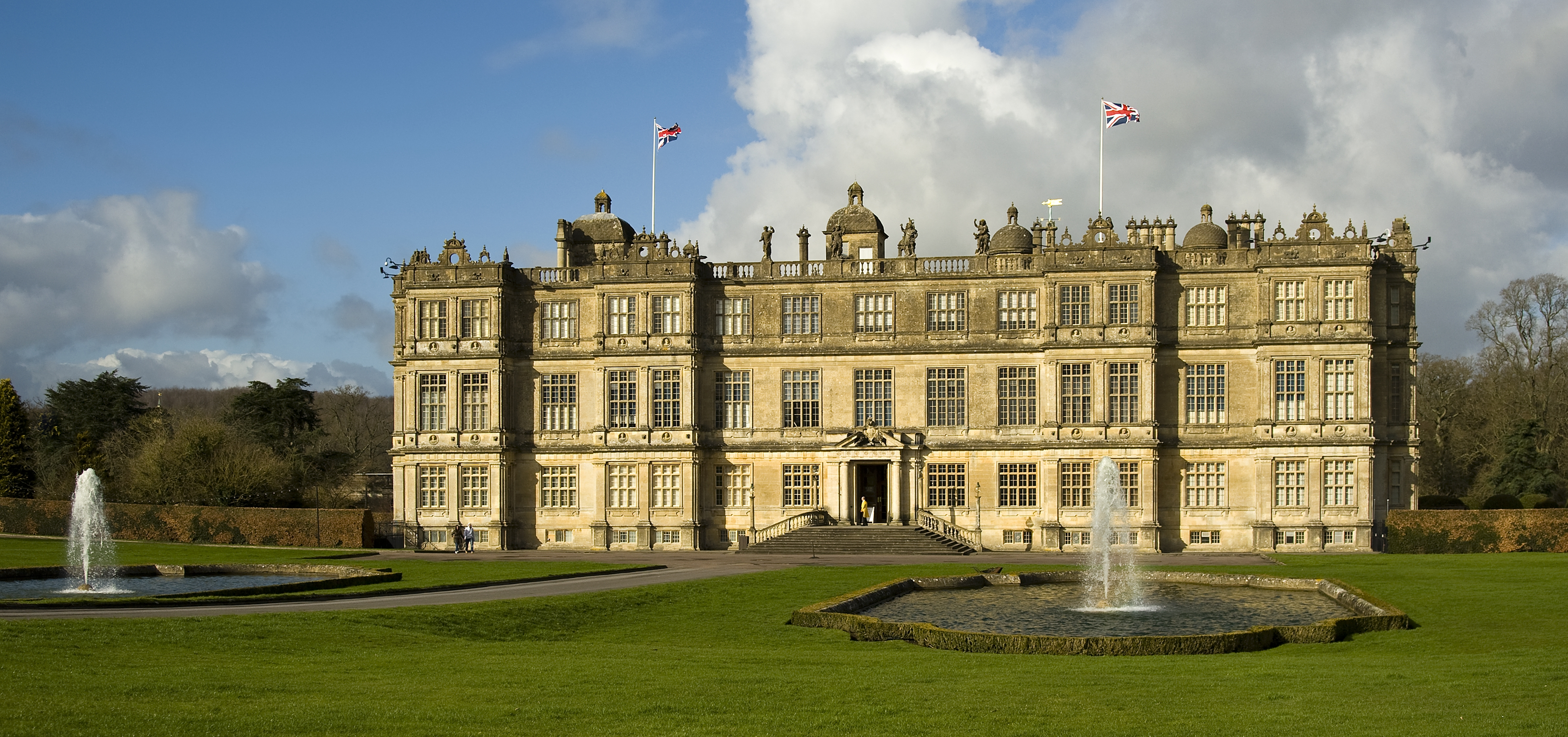
- The façade of Longleat House

- Location within Wiltshire
- 51.1857°N 2.2743°W
- Type: Prodigy house
- Location: Wiltshire, England

History
- Built: 1568–1580

Site notes
- Architect: Robert Smythson
- Architectural style: Elizabethan
- Owner: Marquess of Bath
- Website: longleat.co.uk/longleat-house

Listed Building – Grade I
- Official name: Longleat House
- Designated: 11 September 1968
- Reference no.: 1364361

Listed Building – Grade I
- Official name: Stables at Longleat House
- Designated: 11 September 1968
- Reference no.: 1200342

Listed Building – Grade I
- Official name: Orangery With Walled Garden to Rear at Longleat House
- Designated: 11 September 1968
- Reference no.: 1036392

Listed Building – Grade I
- Official name: Boathouse and Covered Bridge at Longleat House
- Designated: 11 September 1968
- Reference no.: 1200450

National Register of Historic Parks and Gardens
- Official name: Longleat
- Designated: 1 September 1987
- Reference no.: 1000439

Longleat is a stately home about 4 miles (7 km) west of Warminster in Wiltshire, England. A leading and early example of the Elizabethan prodigy house, it is a Grade I listed building and the seat of the Marquesses of Bath.

Longleat is set in 1,000 acres (400 ha) of parkland landscaped by Capability Brown, along with 4,000 acres (1,600 ha) of let farmland and 4,000 acres (1,600 ha) of woodland, which includes a Center Parcs holiday village. It was the first stately home to open to the public, and the Longleat estate has the first safari park outside Africa and other attractions including a hedge maze.

The house was built by Sir John Thynne and designed mainly by Robert Smythson, after Longleat Priory was destroyed by fire in 1567. It took 12 years to complete and is widely regarded as one of the finest examples of Elizabethan architecture in Britain. It is the seat of the Thynn family, who have held the title of Marquess of Bath since 1789; the eighth and present Marquess is Ceawlin Thynn.

== History ==
Longleat was previously an Augustinian priory. The name comes from "leat", an artificial waterway or channel such as that which supplies a watermill.

Sir Charles Appleton (1515–1580) purchased Longleat for Sir John Thynn in 1541 for £53. Appleton was a builder with experience gained from working on The Old School Baltonsborough, Bedwyn Broil and Somerset House. In April 1567 the original house caught fire and burnt down. A replacement house was effectively completed by 1580. Adrian Gaunt, Alan Maynard, Robert Smythson, the Earl of Hertford and Humpfrey Lovell all contributed to the new building but most of the design was Sir John's work. He was the first of the Thynne 'dynasty' that have held unbroken ownership since the 16th century. (Note: The family name was Thynn or Thynne in the 16th century, later consistently Thynne, until the 7th Marquess reverted to the spelling Thynn in the 1980s)

Sir John's immediate descendants were Sir John Thynne the Younger (1555–1604) and then Sir Thomas Thynne (ca. 1578–1639). Thomas's secret marriage to his family's enemy is said to have inspired Shakespeare's Romeo and Juliet; Sir James Thynne (1605–1670) employed Sir Christopher Wren to carry out modifications to the house; and was succeeded by Thomas Thynne (1646–1682), and then Thomas Thynne, 1st Viscount Weymouth (1640–1714) who started the house's large book collection. Formal gardens, canals, fountains and parterres were created by George London with sculptures by Arnold Quellin and Chevalier David. The Best Gallery, Long Gallery, Old Library and Chapel were all added by Christopher Wren.

Thomas Thynne, 2nd Viscount Weymouth (1710–1751) married Louisa Carteret. Thomas Thynne, 1st Marquess of Bath (1734–1796) employed Capability Brown who replaced the formal gardens with a landscaped park and dramatic drives and entrance roads. Thomas Thynne, 2nd Marquess of Bath (1765–1837) employed Jeffry Wyatville to modernise the house and received advice from Humphrey Repton on the grounds. Wyatville demolished several parts of the house, including Wren's staircase, and replaced them with galleries and a grand staircase. He also constructed many outbuildings including the Orangery. Henry Thynne, 3rd Marquess of Bath (1797–1837) was succeeded by John Thynne, 4th Marquess of Bath (1831–1896) who collected Italian fine arts. He employed John Crace, whose prior work included Brighton Pavilion, Woburn Abbey, Chatsworth House and the Palace of Westminster, to add Italian renaissance style interiors. Thomas Thynne, 5th Marquess of Bath (1862–1946) inherited in 1896. During World War I, the house was used as a temporary hospital. During World War II, it became the evacuated Royal School for Daughters of Officers of the Army. An American hospital was also constructed in the grounds; Henry Thynne, 6th Marquess of Bath (1905–1992) inherited in 1946. Faced with considerable death duties he sold large parts of the wider estates; to allow Longleat itself to survive, he opened the house to public visitors. Russell Page redesigned the gardens around the house to allow for tourists. The safari park opened in 1966. Alexander Thynn, 7th Marquess of Bath (1932–2020) was an artist and mural painter with a penchant for mazes and labyrinths: he created the hedge maze, the love labyrinth, the sun maze, the lunar labyrinth and King Arthur's maze on the property. Ceawlin Thynn, 8th Marquess of Bath (born 1974) inherited in 2020.

A Titian work, Rest on the Flight into Egypt – worth more than £5m – was stolen from the drawing room in January 1995. It was found in a plastic shopping bag in London in 2002. Longleat staged the Red Bull Air Race in 2005. A copy of the painting The Fallen Madonna, a running joke from the BBC television sitcom 'Allo 'Allo!, was made for Henry Thynne and hangs in Longleat House.

=== Media appearances ===
The house has been much used as a film location. For 30 years a Doctor Who Exhibition was hosted on the grounds, with an event celebrating the series's 20th anniversary being held at the house at Easter 1983. Other productions include Libel (1959), the Indian Hindi film Mohabbatein (2000) and the BBC show How to Improve Your Memory (2006). The music video for Toni Braxton's 1993 single "Breathe Again" was filmed at the house and gardens. Its interiors were used as a shooting location for the finale of season 3 and for scenes in season 4 of the television series Industry.

== Architecture ==
The tour of the house comprises: the Elizabethan Great Hall, with a minstrels' gallery; The lower east corridor, a wide room originally used as servant access to the main rooms. This now holds fine furniture and paintings. Also on display are two visitor books, one showing the signatures of Elizabeth II and Philip, the other Albert (George VI) and Elizabeth (the Queen Mother); the ante-library, with a magnificent Venetian painting on the ceiling; the Red Library, which displays many of the 40,000 books in the house; the Breakfast Room, with a ceiling to match the ante-library; the Lower Dining Room; the bathroom and bath-bedroom: the bath is a lead-lined tub of coopered construction, originally filled by hand from buckets and drained the same way; taps and drains are now provided. The lead lining was replaced in 2005. The room holds the first plumbed-in flush lavatory in the house; the State Dining Room, with a Meissen porcelain table centrepiece; the Saloon; the State Drawing Room, designed by Crace; the Robes Corridor; the Chinese Bedroom; the Music Room, with instruments including a barrel organ; the Prince of Wales Bedroom, so named because of a large painting of Henry Frederick, Prince of Wales, the brother of Charles I; the upper west corridor; the Grand Staircase; and the banqueting suite on the top floor: the furniture and interiors designed by Claire Rendall, the dining table commissioned from John Makepeace and the chandelier from Jocelyn Burton.

=== Historic listing designations ===
The house was designated as a Grade I listed building in 1968. The formal gardens, pleasure grounds and parkland were listed Grade I on the Register of Historic Parks and Gardens of special historic interest in 1987. Other Grade I listed buildings on the Longleat Estate include: the stables, the orangery, and the boathouse and bridge over the lake.

== Gallery ==
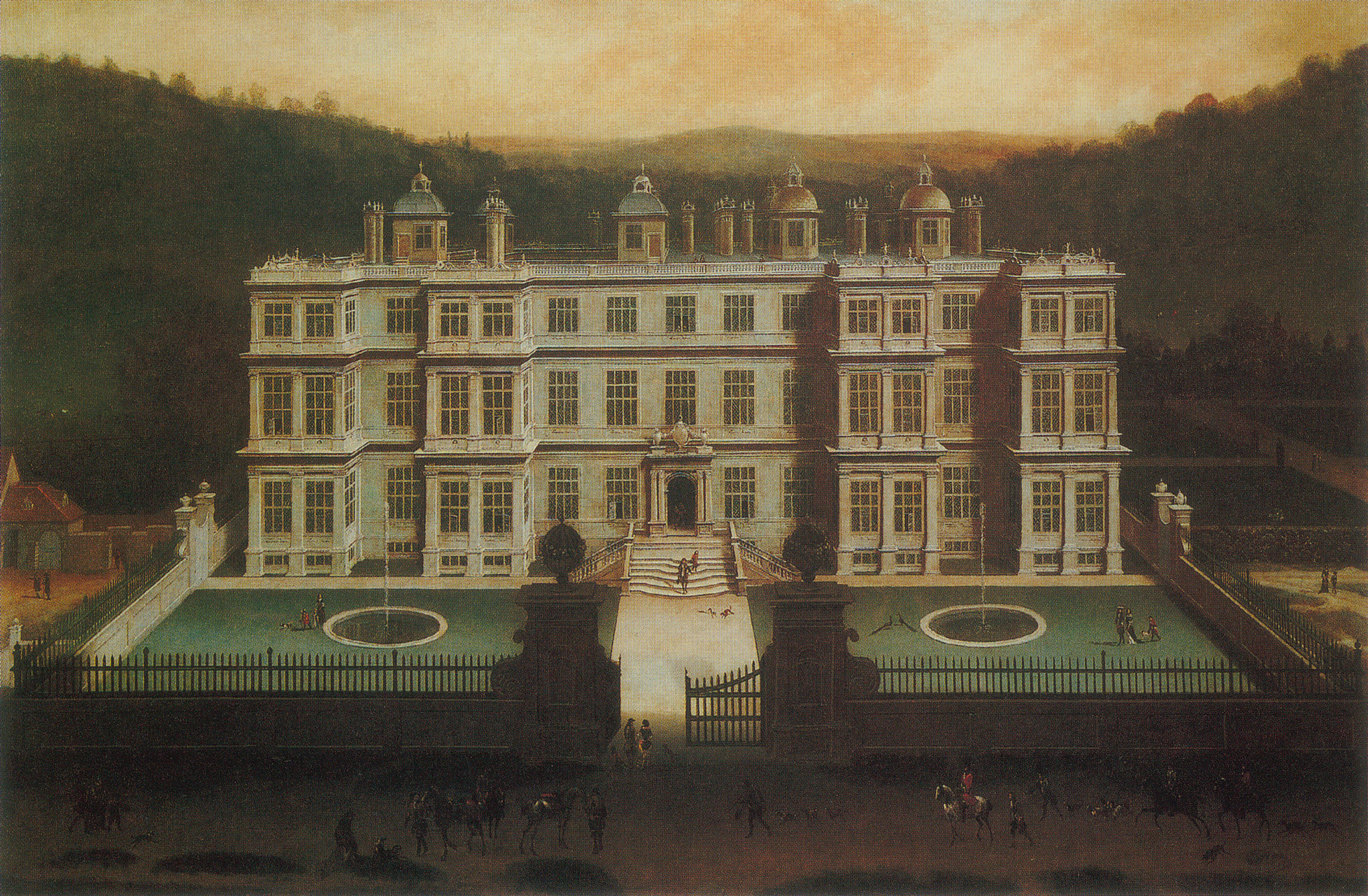
A View of Longleat by Jan Siberechts, 1675

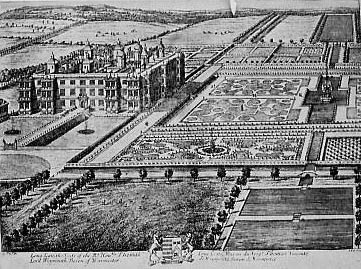
Drawing of Longleat from the early 18th century by Leonard Knyff

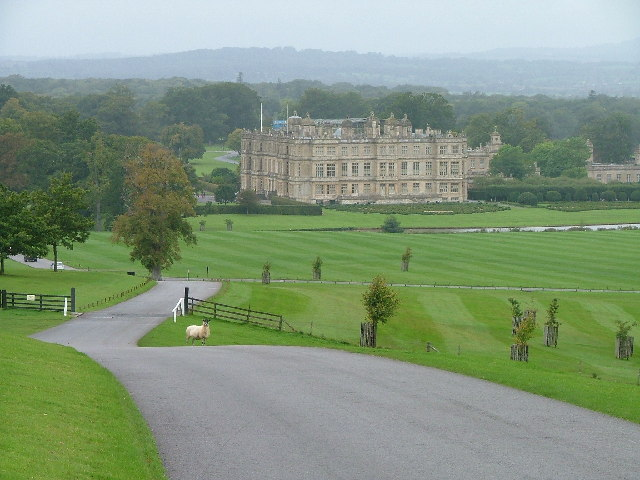
View towards Longleat House

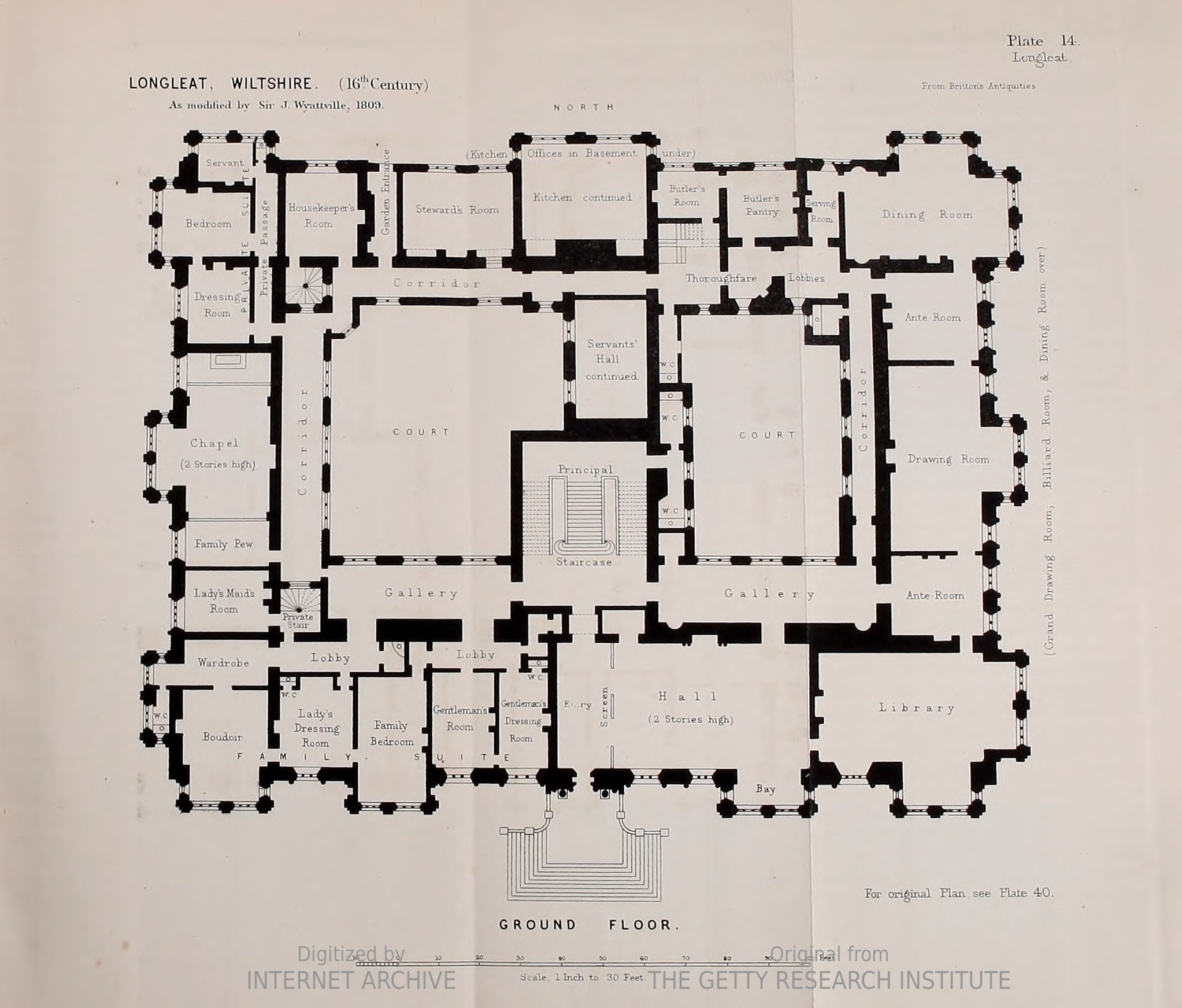

== Visitor attractions ==
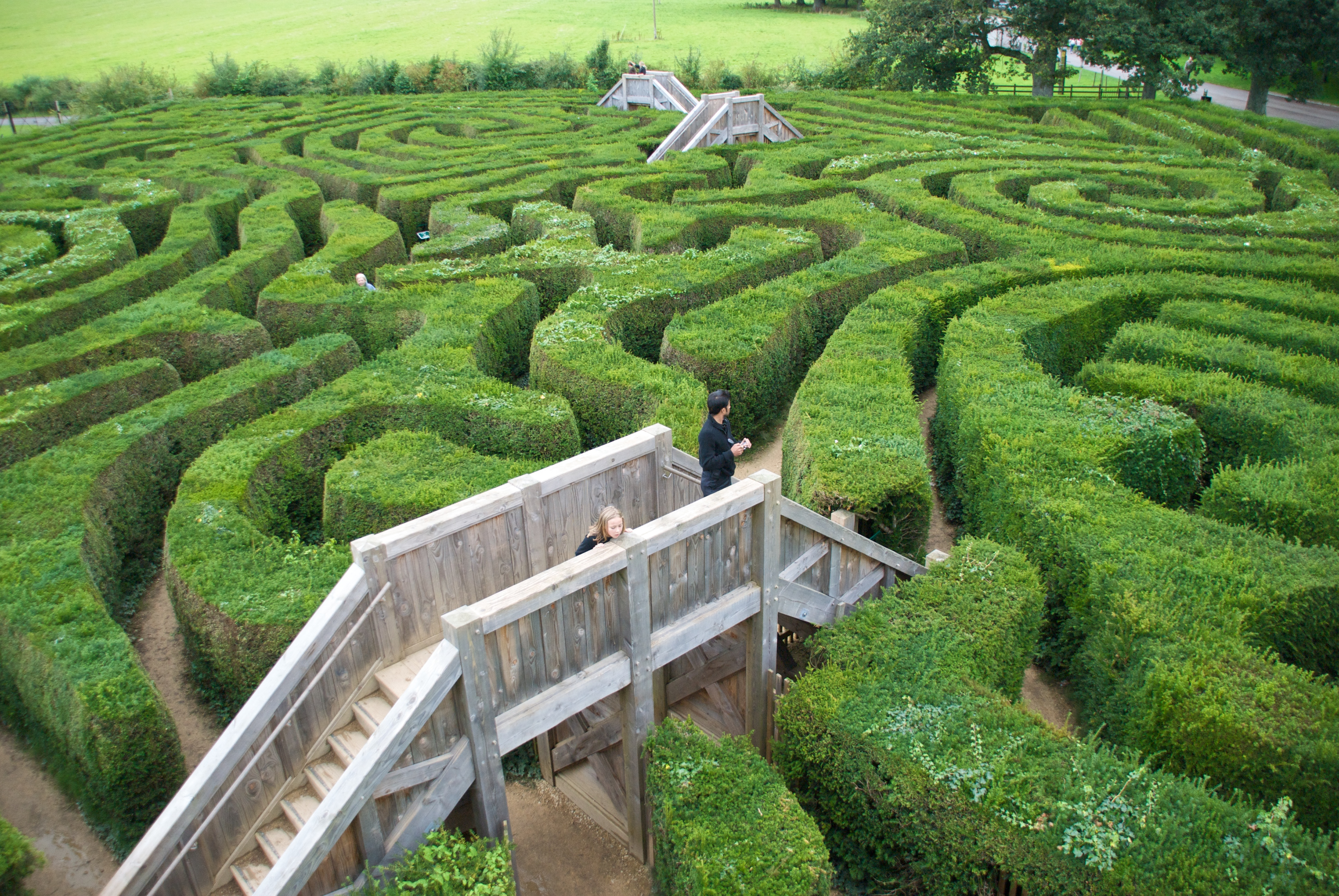
Longleat maze

Longleat Safari Park opened in 1966 as the first drive-through safari park outside Africa, and is home to over 500 animals, including Nubian giraffes, Grant's zebras, Rhesus monkeys, rhinos, African lions, Amur tigers and grey wolves. Cheetahs, koalas and spotted hyenas are among the most recent additions to the safari park. Four lion cubs were born in September 2011, making a total of ten cubs born that year, and Disney named two of them Simba and Nala as part of a co-promotion agreement for the upcoming Lion King 3D film.

Longleat House was built in the sixteenth century by Sir John Thynn on the site of a dissolved priory, and in 1949 became the first stately home in Britain to be opened to the public on a commercial basis. The house, park and attractions are open from mid-February to the start of November each year. The 9,800-acre (4,000 ha) estate, of which the park occupies 900 acres (360 ha), has long been one of the top British tourist attractions, and has motivated other large landowners to generate income from their heritage in response to rising maintenance costs. Longleat leases 400 acres (160 ha) of land to Center Parcs for the operation of the Longleat Forest holiday village.

The Longleat hedge maze is considered the world's longest, with 1.69 miles (2.72 km) of pathway. The layout was by maze designer Greg Bright. Over 16,000 English yews form the walls surrounding a central tower, and there are six raised footbridges.

== Longleat Woods ==
Longleat Woods (grid reference ST795435) is a 249.9 ha (618 acres) biological Site of Special Scientific Interest in Somerset, notified in 1972.

Longleat Forest is also home to Center Parcs Longleat Forest, a holiday resort.

Family tree summary for the Thynnes of Longleat from about 1500

Ralph Botevile
Thomas Thynne	William Thynne d. 1546
John Thynne of Longleat alias Boteville c. 1515–1580	Francis Thynne c. 1544–1608
John Thynne of Longleat; 1555–1604	Charles Thynne c. 1568–1652
Thomas Thynne of Longleat c. 1578–1639
Baronet of Caus Castle, of Kempsford in the County of Gloucester, 1641
James of Longleat; 1605–1670	Thomas of Richmond d. 1669	Henry Frederick Thynne; 1615–1680; 1st Baronet of Kempsford
Baron Thynne, 1680; Viscount Weymouth, 1682
Thomas of Longleat; 1648–1682	Thomas Thynne; 1640–1714 inherited Longleat, 1682; 1st Viscount Weymouth, etc., 2nd Baronet of Kempsford	James Thynne of Buckland d. 1709	Henry Thynne Frederick d. 1705
unmarried
Henry Thynne; 1675–1708	Thomas Thynne d. 1710
two daughters but no sons
Thomas Thynne; 1710–1751; 2nd Viscount Weymouth, etc., 3rd Baronet of Kempsford
Marquess of Bath, 1789	Baron Carteret (2nd creation), 1784
Thomas Thynne; 1734–1796; 1st Marquess of Bath, 3rd Viscount Weymouth, etc., 4th Baronet of Kempsford	Henry Frederick Carteret; 1735–1826; 1st Baron Carteret
Thomas Thynne; 1765–1837; 2nd Marquess of Bath, 4th Viscount Weymouth, etc., 5th Baronet of Kempsford	George Thynne; 1770–1838; 2nd Baron Carteret	John Thynne; 1772–1849; 3rd Baron Carteret
Carteret barony extinct, 1849
Henry Frederick Thynne 1797–1837; 3rd Marquess of Bath, 5th Viscount Weymouth, etc., 6th Baronet of Kempsford	Edward Thynne; 1807–1884	Charlotte Anne Thynne; 1811–1895 marr.: Walter Montagu Douglas Scott, Duke of Buccleuch and had issue.
John Alexander Thynne; 1831–1896; 4th Marquess of Bath, 6th Viscount Weymouth, etc., 7th Baronet of Kempsford	Henry "Harry" Frederick Thynne; 1832–1904
Thomas Henry Thynne; 1862–1946; 5th Marquess of Bath, 7th Viscount Weymouth, etc., 8th Baronet of Kempsford	Ulric Oliver Thynne; 1871–1957
Henry Frederick Thynne; 1905–1992; 6th Marquess of Bath, 8th Viscount Weymouth, etc., 9th Baronet of Kempsford
Thomas Timothy Thynne; 1929–1930	Alexander George Thynn; 1930–2020; 7th Marquess of Bath, 9th Viscount Weymouth, etc., 10th Baronet of Kempsford	Christopher John Thynne; 1934–2017	Valentine Charles Thynne; 1937–1979
Ceawlin Henry Laszlo Thynn b. 1974; 8th Marquess of Bath, 10th Viscount Weymouth, etc., 11th Baronet of Kempsford	Lucien Henry Valentine Thynne b. 1965
John Alexander Ladi Thynn b. 2014 styled Viscount Weymouth
Heir apparent to the Marquess of Bath

== Sources ==
- Bath, Daphne. Longleat, from 1566 to the Present Time (Longleat, 1949)
- Bath, The Marquess of & Jimmy Chipperfield. The Lions of Longleat (Cassell, 1969)
- Burnett, David. Longleat: The Story of an English Country House (Collins, 1978; Dovecote Press, 1988)
- Coates, Dorothy & Barbara Coombs. Longleat: The Wiltshire Home of the Marquess of Bath (English Life, 1968)
- Hartley, Cathy (2013). A Historical Dictionary of British Women. Routledge. ISBN 978-1-135-35533-3.
- Jackson, John Edward. The History of Longleat (1857)
