= Henry Peacham (born 1546) =

English curate and writer

Henry Peacham (1546–1634), sometimes called Henry Peacham the Elder, was an English clergyman, best known for his treatise on rhetoric entitled The Garden of Eloquence.

Peacham was ordained in 1574 and appointed as curate of North Mymms, Herts. It was during his time at North Mymms that he published The Garden of Eloquence in 1577 and had a son Henry Peacham the Younger, who also became an author. In 1578 he became rector of Leverton-in-Holland, in Lincolnshire.

C. S. Lewis described The Garden of Eloquence as 'probably the best' of the Elizabethan books on rhetoric.
