= Henry Peacham (born 1578) =

English writer and engraver

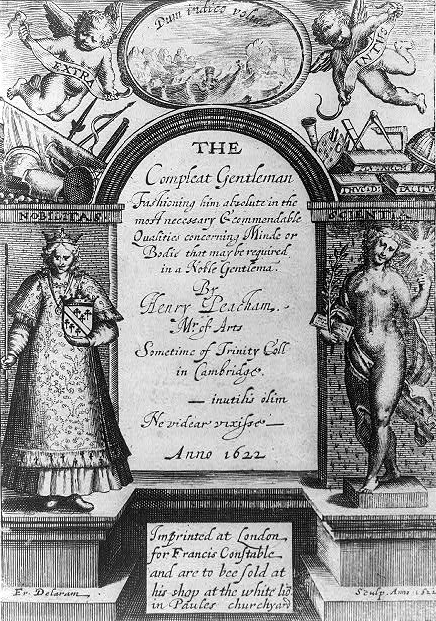
The Complete Gentleman by Henry Peacham (1622). Engraving by Francis Delaram.

Henry Peacham (born 1578, d. in or after 1644) was an English poet and writer, known today primarily for his book, The Compleat Gentleman, first printed in 1622.

== Biography ==
Son of Henry Peacham the Elder, a clergyman, Peacham was a graduate of Trinity College, Cambridge. In 1603, at the age of twenty-five the younger Peacham was a schoolmaster at Kimbolton Grammar School. In 1612 he published a book of printed emblems called Minerva Britanna, based on a manuscript which is believed to have been presented to Henry Frederick, Prince of Wales, in 1610.

Peacham's The Compleat Gentleman is presented as a guidebook on the arts for young men of good birth. In it, he discusses what writers, poets, composers, philosophers, and artists gentlemen should study in order to become well-educated. Because he mentions a large number of contemporary artistic figures, he is often cited as a primary source in studies of Renaissance artists and composers. He lived in Fetter Lane, London, and was good friends with John Dowland, who lived on the same street.

A representative passage from The Compleat Gentleman:

"For composition, I prefer next Ludovico de Victoria, a most judicious and a sweet composer: after him Orlando di Lasso, a very rare and excellent Author, who lived some forty years since in the court of the Duke of Bavier."

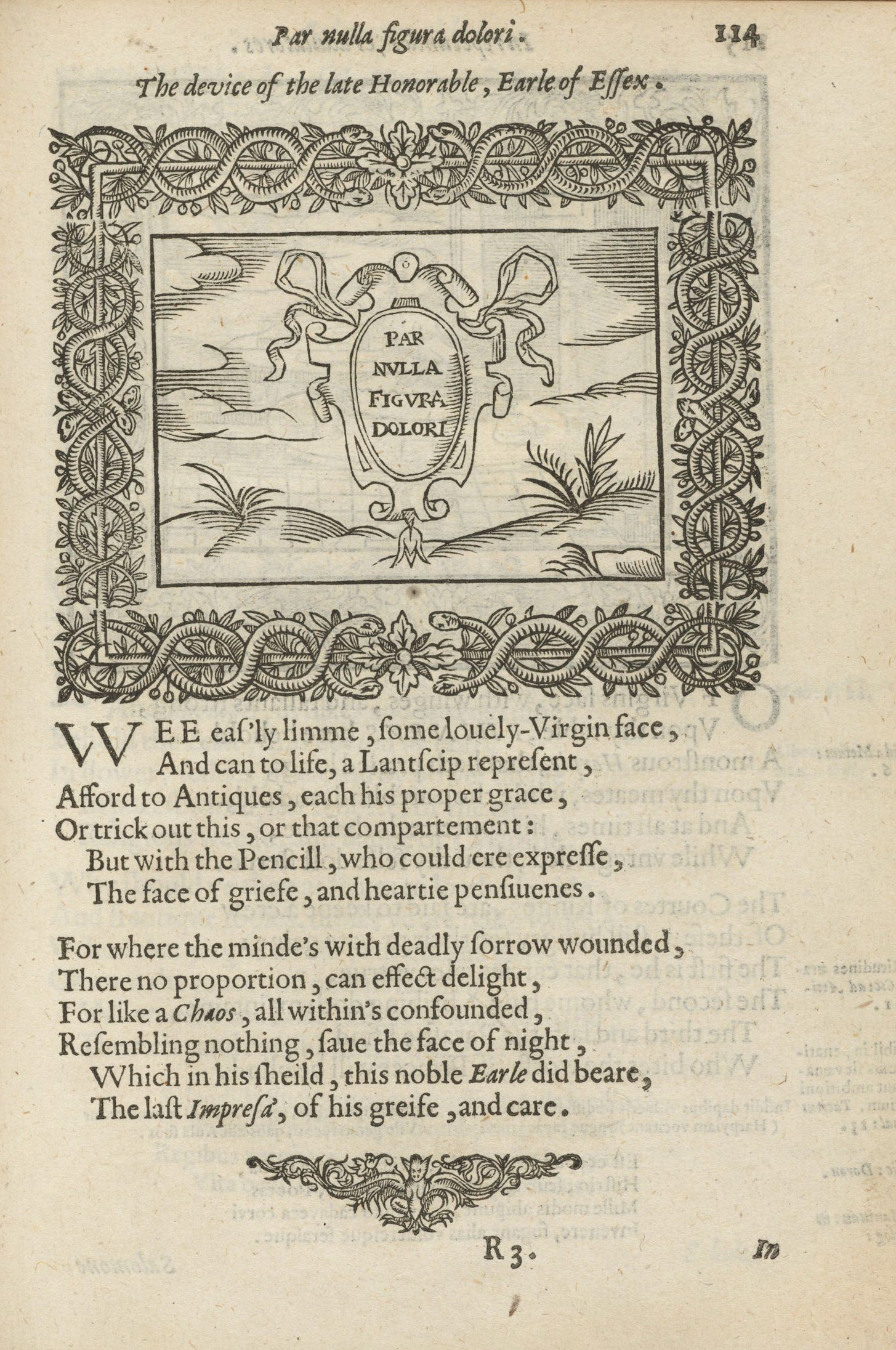
Page from Minerua Britanna or A garden of heroical deuises, 1612
