= John Thynne (died 1604) =

English landowner and Member of Parliament

Sir John Thynne (21 September 1555 – 21 November 1604) of Longleat House, Wiltshire, was an English landowner and Member of Parliament.

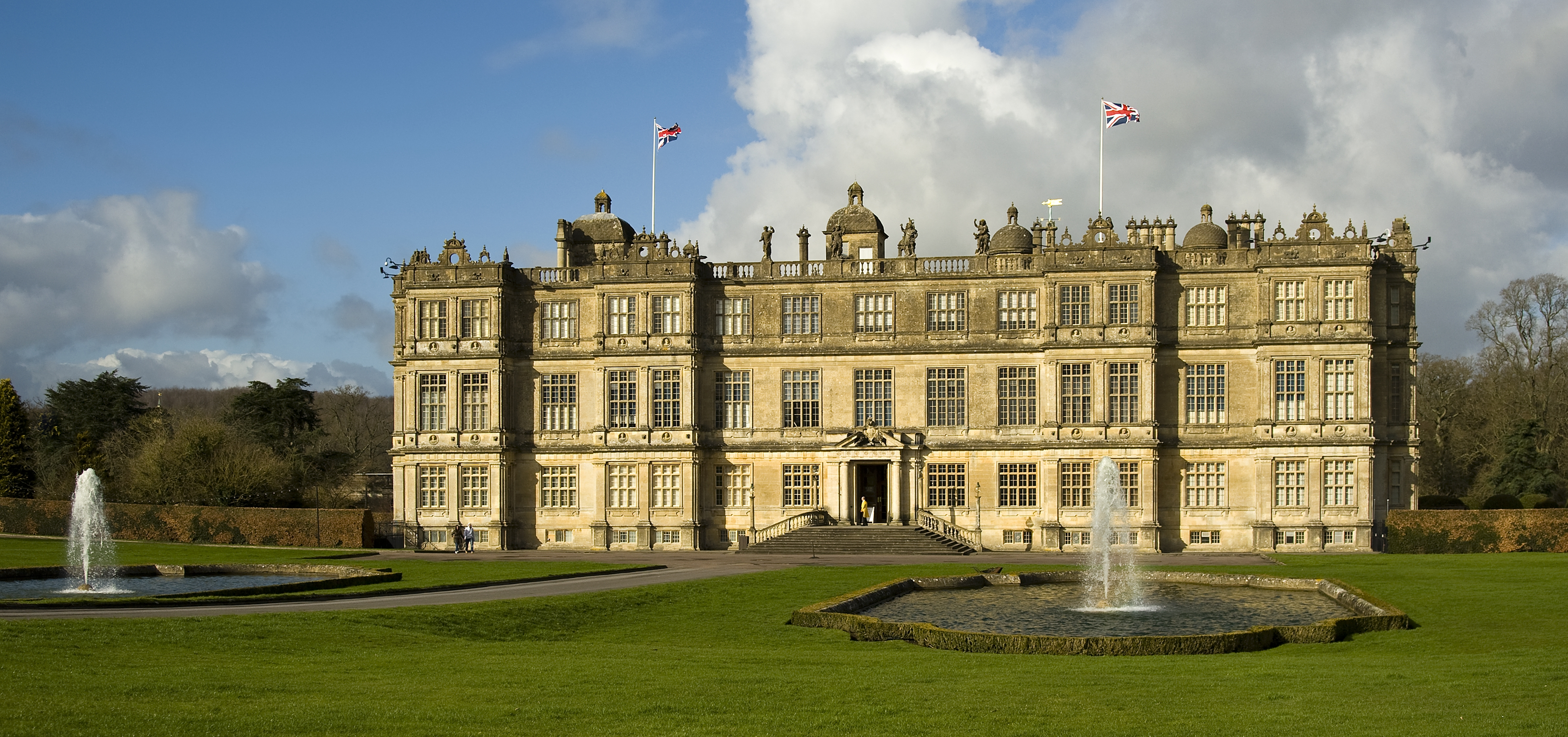
Longleat House, Wiltshire

He was the eldest son of Sir John Thynne of Longleat and Christian, the daughter of Sir Richard Gresham, a London mercer. He was educated at Oxford, graduating BA in 1573. He succeeded his father in 1580, inheriting Longleat House, which his father had built, and was knighted in 1603.

He married Joan, the daughter of Sir Rowland Heyward, Lord Mayor of London, of Cripplegate, London, with whom he had two sons.

He served as a justice of the peace in Wiltshire, Gloucestershire, Hampshire and Shropshire and was appointed High Sheriff of Wiltshire for 1593–94.

He was elected a member (MP) of the Parliament of England for Heytesbury in 1584, 1586, 1593, 1597 and 1601, and for Wiltshire in 1589 and 1604.

His wife's father gave her Caus Castle in Shropshire, but its ownership was disputed. After he and Joan took the castle by force in 1591, Joan lived at Caus whilst John was based at Longleat. The letters between them illustrate their partnership. Joan appears to have managed many aspects of their estate.

In 1594, his son and heir Thomas made a secret marriage to Maria Tuchet, the daughter of George Tuchet, Lord Audley and Lucy Marvyn. This was the family of their enemies: Thomas's grandfather Sir John Thynne had a 15-year feud with Sir James Marvyn, Maria's grandfather. Joan was involved with unsuccessful attempts for many years to have that marriage annulled. The secret marriage is said to have contributed to the inspiration for Shakespeare's Romeo and Juliet. The dispute over the marriage was resolved in 1601, and when her husband John died in 1604, Longleat passed into the hands of her enemy Maria Thynne.

He was succeeded by his eldest son Thomas and his wife Maria Thynne.
