= Lady Bath =

Lady Bath may refer to:

- Rachel Bourchier, Countess of Bath
- Laura Pulteney, 1st Countess of Bath
- Anna Thynn, Marchioness of Bath
- Emma Thynn, Marchioness of Bath
