= Danny Ayalon =

Israeli diplomat, columnist and politician

- דני אילון
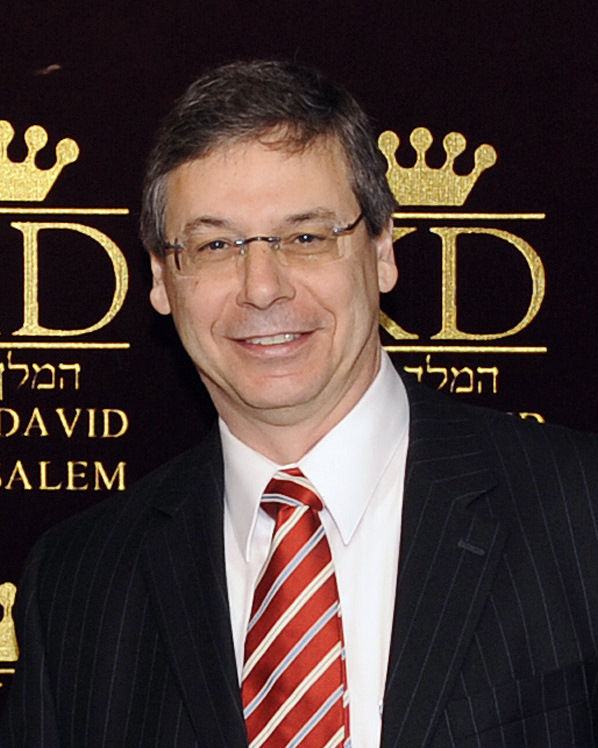

Ministerial roles
- 2009–2013: Deputy Foreign Minister

Faction represented in the Knesset
- 2009–2013: Yisrael Beiteinu

Diplomatic roles
- 2002–2006: Ambassador to the United States

Personal details
- Born: Daniel Ayalon; 17 December 1955 (age 70) Tel Aviv, Israel

Daniel Ayalon (Hebrew: דניאל "דני" אילון; born 17 December 1955) is an Israeli diplomat, columnist and politician. He served as Deputy Foreign Minister and as a member of the Knesset. He was the Israeli Ambassador to the United States from 2002 until 2006. Previously, he worked as senior foreign policy advisor to Prime Ministers Ariel Sharon, Ehud Barak, and Benjamin Netanyahu.

== Early life and education ==
Danny Ayalon was born in Tel Aviv in 1955. His late mother Lily Ellon immigrated to Mandatory Palestine from Poland in 1937, thereby escaping the Holocaust, in which members of her extended family perished. His father, Rafael Ayalon, immigrated from Algeria to Mandatory Palestine before the establishment of Israel in 1948. Both of his parents fought in the War of Independence, 1948 Arab–Israeli War. His mother fought in the War of Independence in Jerusalem, and was wounded in battle, and his father fought in the Golani Brigade. Ayalon was raised and educated in Tel Aviv and was drafted into the Israel Defense Forces where he rose to the rank of captain in the Armored Corps. He received a BA in economics from Tel Aviv University and an MBA from Bowling Green State University in Ohio.

Prior to his career in public service, Ayalon was a partner at Gravitas Ltd., an international consulting group, past president of private investment firm Hod Ayalon Ltd, and a finance manager for Koor Industries.

Ayalon is married to Anne Ayalon, who is from an American Evangelical Christian family. Ayalon met her while she was on internship in Israel, and she converted to Judaism. The couple has two daughters, Zohar and Avigail. He is a cousin of Orit Noked.

== Foreign service career ==
Ayalon was a member of the Israeli delegations to Sharm el-Sheikh (1997), Wye Plantation (1998) and Camp David (2000) summits. From 1993–1997, he served as the Director of the Bureau of Israel's Ambassador to the United Nations in New York City. He was Israel's Ambassador to Panama from 1991–1992.

=== Israel's Ambassador to the United States ===
Ayalon was appointed Israel's Ambassador to the United States in 2002 by then Prime Minister Ariel Sharon. Before his appointment, Ayalon had served as a Deputy Foreign Policy Adviser to Prime Minister Binyamin Netanyahu and to Ehud Barak as well as Chief Foreign Policy Advisor to Prime Minister Ariel Sharon.

Throughout his time in Washington, Ayalon cultivated a strong relationship with President George W. Bush and played a leading role in the Road Map for Peace negotiations between President Bush and Prime Minister Sharon. He also secured the agreement for $9 billion in U.S. grants and loan guarantees to Israel beginning in 2003 which Israel needed in order to raise funds abroad at low interest rates. In early 2012, as Israel's Deputy Foreign Minister, Ayalon, met with his U.S. counterparts to secure another three-year, $3.8 billion extension of loan guarantees.

== Co-chairman of Nefesh B'Nefesh ==
Upon retiring from the foreign service in 2006, Ayalon became the co-chairman of Nefesh B'Nefesh, an organization that encourages Aliyah by Jewish people to Israel from North America and other English-speaking areas. Forming alliances with government bodies in Israel and Jewish organizations from around the world, he played a critical role in Israel's decision to fund private Aliyah beginning in September 2007. On 31 December 2008, Ayalon left Nefesh B'Nefesh "to pursue an independent political career opportunity".

Danny Ayalon was considered to be a highly valued and professional diplomat by senior government officials around the world including former Secretary of State, Condoleezza Rice.

== Deputy Foreign Minister ==
=== Election and appointment ===
In August 2008, Ayalon joined Avigdor Lieberman's Yisrael Beiteinu as chairman of World Yisrael Beiteinu, opening branches of the party around the globe. Ayalon explained that Israel Beiteinu was a natural fit for him as he entered politics because he saw many problems, especially with Israeli foreign policy.

Ayalon is working to reform the Israeli parliamentary style democracy into a less representative democratic government. Such change will allow Israel to have a greater unity of government and to take more uniformed political positions.

Ayalon was placed seventh on the party's list for the 2009 elections to the Knesset, and was elected in February 2009 after the party won 15 seats. In April 2009, Ayalon was appointed Deputy Foreign Minister in Binyamin Netanyahu's newly elected government. According to The Jerusalem Post, "Ayalon's role is to serve as Lieberman's de facto foreign minister, explaining and justifying his Lieberman's diplomatic plans to the world in a way that only a respected, seasoned diplomat can".

In December 2012, Ayalon was one of three Yisrael Beiteinu MKs not included on the party's list of candidates for the January 2013 elections. Ayalon "issued a statement saying he was thankful for the opportunity to serve as deputy foreign minister for four years and pledged to continue to act in the country's interests in any future role."

=== Government and electoral reform ===
According to Ayalon, a major focus of Israeli diplomatic work involves branding: "We must brand Israel as a democratic Western society, productive and technologically advanced, one that contributes to the world and helps solve the major challenges facing humankind. Israeli democracy in general, and its political system in particular, are the best tools with which to showcase our brand". However, Ayalon, who admires the American system, in conjunction with Lieberman, calls for political and electoral reform in Israel to create greater accountability and consistency within the government, stating: "In autocratic regimes you have maximum govern-ability, because the leadership can make decisions without an opposition, and there are no checks or balances. Here, we are perhaps too far toward the other extreme; we have almost complete representation with little governability". In his opinion, "a homogenous government, comprised of like-minded ministers speaking with one voice and representing a singular policy framework is required to contribute to clear public diplomacy, the sort of diplomacy that Israel sorely needs now to combat the cohesive narrative and branding effort put forth by the Palestinians".

=== Foreign policy ===
Ayalon aims to develop and expand Israel's diplomatic ties worldwide and to form new coalitions through economic and political cooperation and greater foreign aid. In 2011, he embarked on a Latin American tour with an official visit to Mexico and a visit to El Salvador where he attended the General Assembly of the Organization of American States (OAS), addressing the ramifications of the Palestinian unilateral declaration of statehood and the mounting Iranian threat. Earlier, Ayalon had worked with several nations in order to combat the Goldstone Report and its effects.

Israel–U.S. Strategic Dialogue

Ayalon maintains a strong relationship with the United States. He serves as Israel's representative in the semi-annual Israel–U.S. Strategic Dialogue.

Israeli–Arab relations

In an appeal to the Arab world, Ayalon wrote a piece for the pan-Arab newspaper, Asharq Alawsat in 2009, explaining Israel's past and ongoing partnerships within the Arab world such as Israel's training of Jordanians in advanced agricultural techniques, calling them positive bridges on the road to peace and coexistence.

At the sixth annual international WATEC-Israel exhibition in November 2011, Ayalon offered the Arab world to share Israel's advanced water technologies. "Israel will benefit from a peace agreement, but you will also gain a genuine partner for development and the assured welfare of future generations in the region," Ayalon said at the opening session.

Israeli settlements

Ayalon slammed the claims that settlements were the cause of violence, citing the pre-state 1929 Arab killing of Jews in Hebron. He has criticized world leaders who accuse Israel of destroying the peace process by building in East Jerusalem neighborhoods such as Gilo.

In 2005, as Israel's representative to the United States, Ayalon supported Israel's unilateral disengagement plan, in which all Israeli settlements in the Gaza Strip were evacuated. However, as a Member of the Knesset, Ayalon explained that he feels the disengagement was a mistake and, "in hindsight we shouldn't have done it because it was excruciatingly painful".

Israeli–Palestinian conflict

According to Ayalon, "the real obstacle to peace is Palestinian rejection of Israel and the self-determination of the Jewish people". He has condemned Palestinian claims which "deny the Jewish people's connection with its homeland", and the Palestinian Authority Ministry of Information's false claims that the Jews have no past connections to the Western Wall of the ancient Temple of Jerusalem and to the Tomb of Rachel the Matriarch.

Ayalon called the Gaza flotilla raid of May 2010, in which nine activists were killed and many injured, a "provocation", stating: "On the deck we found weapons which were used against the forces. The organizers' intent was violent and the results were unfortunate. Israel regrets the loss of life. We called the organizers once again the [sic] stop the provocations". He has criticized claims that the Palestinians living in the Gaza Strip are in the midst of a humanitarian crisis as a result of Israel's blockade citing that, "Gaza receives equivalent of 40% of goods imported by Israel. It's absurd for Israel to take care of Gazans while Hamas fires rockets."

Iran

At the Munich Security Conference in February 2011, Ayalon, emphasizing Germany's crucial part in crushing the Iranian threat, stated: "The Iranian regime today is just as dangerous to the world as Hitler was in the 1930s. We don't have the luxury of waiting for the results of the sanctions on Iran; we must immediately put heavy pressure on Iran until it cracks. Germany, as the strongest country in the European Union, must provide an answer to the needs of the European states that get oil from Iran, so that they will no longer be dependent on Iranian oil." He also made an appeal to Office of the High Commissioner for Human Rights Navanethem Pillay to cancel her plans to visit Iran, stating that the visit would legitimize a regime that "maliciously violates human rights, executes its citizens and openly calls for genocide".

Refugees

Ayalon has appealed to the United Nations High Commissioner for Refugees (UNHCR) to end what he called the "morally and politically unacceptable" solution created for the Palestinian refugees, the United Nations Relief and Works Agency (UNRWA), accusing it to perpetuate the Israeli-Palestinian conflict by not finding permanent solutions for refugees. "While the UNHCR has found durable solutions for tens of millions of refugees, the agency created specifically for the Palestinian context, UNRWA, has found durable solutions for no one", he stated at a conference in Geneva. He also called for redress for the approximately 850,000 Jews from Arab counties who fled their homes after Israel was established. He said that while the refugee issue was a "core element" in solving the conflict, both Palestinian and Jewish refugees have to be taken into account.

Turkish Relations

Ayalon became internationally known in early 2010, after he summoned the Turkish ambassador to Israel, Ahmet Oğuz Çelikkol, to complain about a Turkish television series, Kurtlar Vadisi Pusu, which showed anti-Semitic motifs, including Mossad agents snatching a Muslim baby to convert to Judaism and shooting old men. At the meeting, Ayalon did not display the Turkish flag, and pointed out to the waiting media that the Turkish Ambassador sat on a lower sofa. Ayalon later apologized to Çelikkol for any personal slight or insult, but not for the substance of the rebuke.

Holy See Negotiations

In December 2009, Ayalon led high-level diplomatic discussions with the Holy See concerning Church properties and taxes, leading to an agreement in early 2012 between Israel and the Vatican in which the latter agreed to waive its demand to receive sovereignty over The Cenacle, the location of the Last Supper, on Jerusalem's Mount Zion. Israel, in return, agreed to consider giving the Church access to the site and is considering a leasing option. As part of the agreement, the Vatican will for the first time pay a reduced property tax for its large amount of assets in Israel.

=== International aid ===
Ayalon supports expanding Israel's global initiatives through MASHAV, Israel's National Agency for International Development. Following the 2010 earthquake, MASHAV deployed emergency medical services and police forces to Haiti. Israel was also the first country to set up a field hospital in Japan after the 2011 earthquake. Through MASHAV Israel has partnered with the United States in Ethiopia, with Germany in Ethiopia and Ghana, with Italy in Senegal, and with Japan and Denmark in the Middle East.

In January 2011, Ayalon and German Federal Minister for Economic Cooperation and Development Dirk Niebel met and signed a joint Declaration of Intent aimed to increase bilateral cooperation in effort to assist developing nations, agreeing to work towards the rehabilitation of the contaminated Lake Victoria in Kenya, the main source of water for several states and one of the sources of the Nile River. In February of the same year Ayalon and Niebel met again to examine aid to the new Republic of South Sudan.

Also in February 2011, Ayalon signed a joint declaration of cooperation on water supply and sustainable energy technology management with Polish Minister of the Environment Bernard Blaszczyk. Israel and Poland will cooperate to promote investment, the exchanging of technologies, and the sharing of information.

=== Videos ===
In a video titled "The Truth About the West Bank" released by the Israeli foreign ministry in June 2011, Ayalon presents a historical narrative meant to help wage the public diplomacy battle about Israel's ongoing conflict with the Palestinians. In the video made in cooperation with StandWithUs, which is very similar to one released earlier by the Yesha council, the organization of the Jewish settlements in the West Bank, Ayalon asks viewers to stop referring to the West Bank as "occupied territories". "It is time for Israel to return to a 'rights-based diplomacy' and talk about the facts, rights, history and international law which are little known but give a dramatically different viewpoint to what is currently accepted," he said after the video's release. After the video was posted online, Saeb Erekat, the Palestinian Authority's top negotiator, denounced the video as a "falsified account of history and international law", but refused to participate in a public debate on the issues raised in the video proposed by Ayalon.

Two more videos starring Ayalon were released: "The Truth About the Peace Process" in September 2011, and "The Truth About the Refugees" in December 2011.

In 2017, Ayalon released a video titled "The true history of the Palestinian people" based on the book A History of the Palestinian People. He also published a video about Jerusalem. The video went viral and is considered to have played an important and successful role in ultimately convincing the Trump administration to move the United States Embassy to Jerusalem.

== Social media ==
In the Ministry of Foreign Affairs, Ayalon has worked to expand Israel's social media diplomacy by helping the ministry maintain over 100 Facebook pages, including "Israel speaks Arabic", a page written in Arabic. After the initiatives launch, Ayalon explained that "it is vital that Israel's voice is heard in every corner of the world and even more so amongst its immediate neighbors". Ayalon has over 65,000 Facebook followers. The Jewish Telegraphic Agency ranked him as the most influential Israeli Politician on Twitter and one of the 100 most influential Jews in 2010. Ayalon has more than 44,000 Twitter followers. He also has nearly 1,000,000 totally upload views on YouTube. He has been recognized as one of the world's leading politicians to utilize social media by web based policy center Dimpool and by Foreign Policy, surpassing President Barack Obama.

== Community service and involvement ==
Ayalon has served as a member of the Executive Board at the University Center in Ariel, as Vice Chair of the Israel-America Chamber of Commerce, and as a Board Member of the America-Israel Friendship League. He is a supporter of Aish HaTorah yeshiva and says he tries to make time each week to learn with Rabbi Ephraim Shore of the yeshiva.

In partnership with "Latet," Ayalon asked the workers at the Foreign Ministry as well as Green-Israel and Alma-Gilro to donate food to make over 100 Purim baskets for Holocaust survivors in Jerusalem. In 2011, together with United with Israel, Ayalon helped launch another Purim basket campaign to give soldiers a special thank you during the holiday. For Passover that same year, Ayalon and workers at the Ministry initiated the project, "Lending a (Diplomatic) Hand to the Community", where they hand-picked over 2,000 kg of beetroot that was donated to over 700 needy Israeli families.

Ayalon has been a co-host on the English speaking Rusty Mike Radio station based in Jerusalem where he expressed his affection for the English speaking community and played some of his favorite music including the Beatles.

Since 2014, Ayalon has been serving as a visiting professor of foreign policy studies at Yeshiva University. He is the founder of The Truth About Israel, a nonprofit organization that defends Israel in the social media.

== Awards and recognition ==
In 2005, Ayalon received the Brandeis Award of the Jewish Community of Baltimore. He was the recipient of Aish Hatorah's Builder of Jerusalem Award in 2008.
