= Jadesinmi =

Jádésinmi or Jádésinmi is a surname. Notable people with the surname include:

- Amy Jadesimi (born 1976), Nigerian businesswoman
- Oladipo Jadesimi, Nigerian businessman
