= Ceawlin Thynn, 8th Marquess of Bath =

British businessman and marquess (born 1974)

The Most Honourable The Marquess of Bath

Personal details
- Born: Ceawlin Henry Laszlo Thynn; 6 June 1974 (age 52) Hammersmith, London, England
- Spouse: Emma McQuiston (m. 2013)
- Children: 2
- Parents: Alexander Thynn, 7th Marquess of Bath; Anna Gyarmathy
- Education: University College London
- Occupation: Businessman

Ceawlin Henry Laszlo Thynn, 8th Marquess of Bath (/ˈsiːɔːlɪn/; SEE-aw-lin; born 6 June 1974), styled Viscount Weymouth between 1992 and 2020, is a British peer, landowner, and businessman, active in companies in the leisure, tourism, real estate and financial services sectors.

== Early life ==
Born in Hammersmith, the first son and second child of Alexander Thynn, 7th Marquess of Bath, and his wife Anna Gyarmathy, Ceawlin Thynn was educated at Horningsham Primary School, a village school near the family estate of Longleat, in Wiltshire, then at Kingdown School in Warminster and Bedales School in Hampshire; he finally read economics and philosophy at University College London.

He is named after Ceawlin of Wessex, having been born shortly after his father had stood as the Wessex Regionalists' parliamentary candidate in Westbury at the February 1974 United Kingdom general election.

In 1996, Thynn was injured in a building collapse in New Delhi, India, initially thought to be caused by a terrorist bomb, which killed his girlfriend, Jane Kirby, and his business partner, Crinan Wilde.

== Business career ==
Thynn began his business career as an emerging markets specialist at the London investment bank Caspian Securities, before becoming a partner in Sabre Projects, a real estate development firm. At Sabre he put together a project with Group Menatep, the holding company of Russia's then-largest oil company, Yukos, to develop a mid-market hotel in every major city in Russia.

In 2008, Thynn formed the Lion Trust, a private equity vehicle of which he is the principal. The Lion Trust invests in a range of mature and emerging markets.

Since June 2010, Thynn has been a director at Finmetron AB, a Swedish listed firm offering factoring services in Russia.

From 2010 until 2013, Thynn was executive chairman of Wombat's Holdings GmbH – a chain of hostels in Germany and Austria – having acquired a majority stake in the company. In 2013, the company was bought back by its former owners.

== Longleat ==
In January 2009, Thynn became chairman of Longleat Enterprises, a limited company that manages business interests at Longleat House and Safari Park on the family estate of Longleat, Wiltshire, as well as the commercial activities at Cheddar Gorge, in the Mendip Hills in Somerset. In early 2010, Thynn's father passed the management of the family business over to him. Following this retirement, Thynn hired a new estate chief executive, David Bradley, formerly of Legoland. Together, they worked with designers from Hollywood to make improvements to the house and park; additions to the park included "Jungle Kingdom", "Monkey Temple", and "Hunters of the Sky". In September 2013, Bradley resigned, and in February 2014 the American Bob Montgomery was hired for the same role.

In April 2020, Thynn's father died, and he succeeded him as Marquess of Bath.

Thynn is a trustee of the Longleat Charitable Trust, a charity established in 1996 that focuses on relieving poverty around the Longleat estate and Cheddar Gorge.

== Politics ==
Thynn made donations of £30,000 and £15,000 to the Liberal Democrats during the 2019 general election.

== Personal life ==
In November 2012, aged 38, Thynn announced his engagement to Emma McQuiston, the daughter of Suzanna McQuiston and Nigerian oil billionaire Chief Oladipo Jadesimi, a founder and the executive chairman of Lagos Deep Offshore Logistics. She is a younger half-sister of Iain McQuiston, the husband of Thynn's half-aunt, Lady Silvy Cerne Thynne, a daughter of his paternal grandfather, the 6th Marquess of Bath, by his second wife. Thynn’s mother was reported as strongly disapproving of her son's upcoming marriage, due to her prospective daughter-in-law's African ancestry, and she was not invited to the wedding.

It was reported that Thynn intended to evict his father's 'wifelets' from their estate cottages, and some murals painted by his father were removed from Longleat. A rift between them developed.

Thynn and McQuiston were married at Longleat on 8 June 2013. Thynn's parents did not attend the ceremony. They have two sons, John, born in 2014, after the Marchioness had suffered serious problems during her pregnancy, and Henry, born in 2016, genetically the couple’s child, born to a surrogate mother in the United States.

In 2026, the trustees of three family trusts sought High Court approval for Henry and his future children to be added as beneficiaries. The trusts, governed by pre-1970 deeds, use historical common law definitions of relationships, leading to uncertainty over Henry. At a hearing in Bristol in February, the judge approved the appointment of a solicitor to represent the interests of other beneficiaries, including John, who could be affected by the decision. In May 2026, the High Court granted the trustees the power to add Henry as a beneficiary, although this was not to be exercised immediately, partly to avoid complications relating to United States taxation, owing to his birth in the United States.

Peerage of Great Britain
| Preceded by Alexander Thynne | Marquess of Bath; 2020–present | Incumbent |
