= There was no such thing as Palestinians =

Statement by Israeli Prime Minister Golda Meir

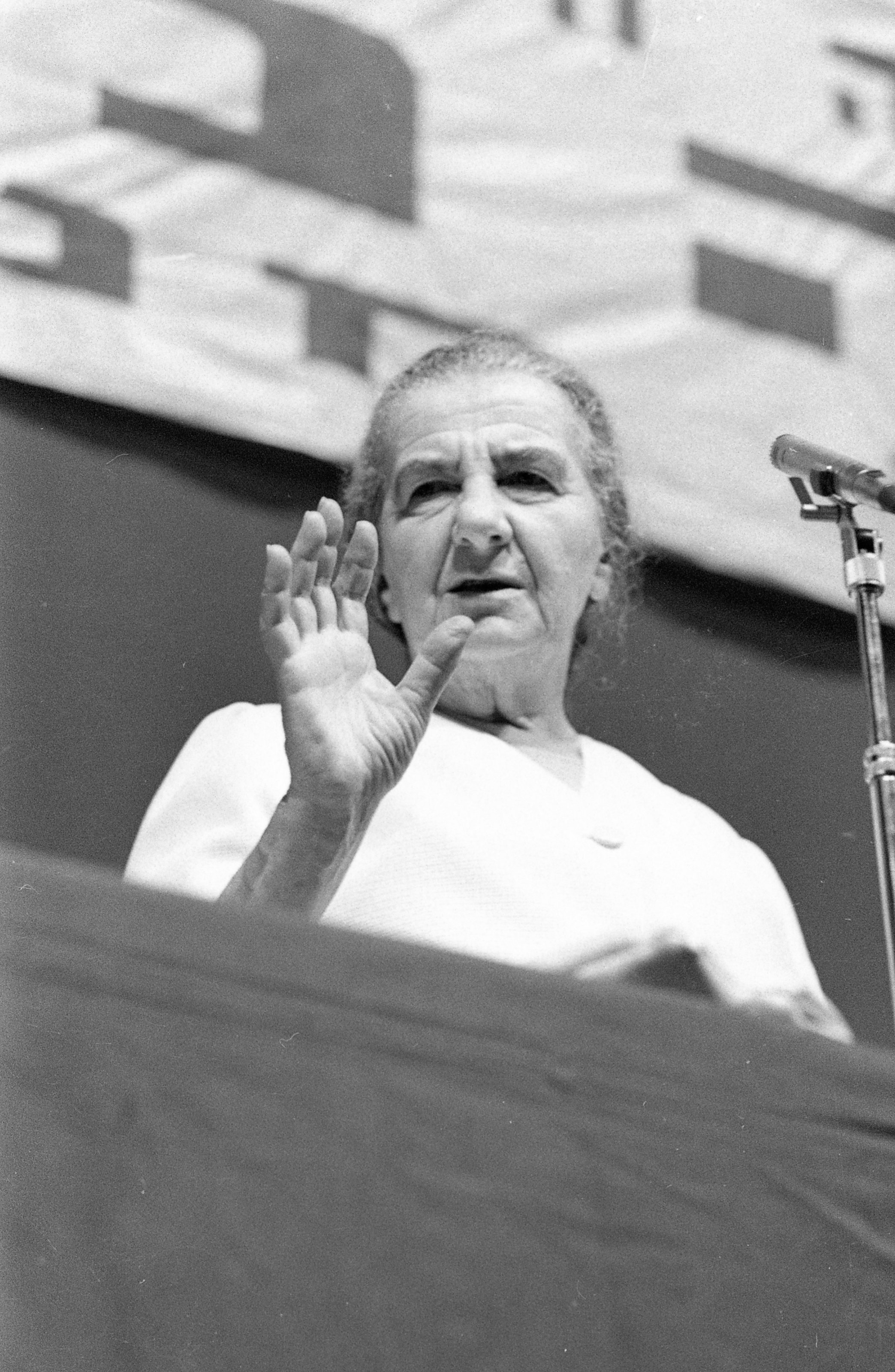
Meir in 1969

"There was no such thing as Palestinians" is part of a widely repeated statement by Golda Meir, the then Israeli prime minister, in her second month in office, made in an interview with Frank Giles, then deputy editor of The Sunday Times on June 15, 1969, to mark the second anniversary of the Six-Day War.

Dov Waxman considers Meir's statement the most famous expression by Israelis of the denial of a Palestinian identity separate and distinct from Arabs. The quote has been frequently used to illustrate Israel's denial of Palestinian history, and is considered to sum up the Palestinians' sense of victimization by Israel. It is considered to be a successor to the early Christian Zionist phrase "A land without a people for a people without a land".

Edward Said, a Palestinian American professor and activist, asserted that it was Meir's "most celebrated remark". Al Jazeera journalist Alasdair Soussi wrote that "Meir's jingoistic comments concerning Palestinians remain one of her defining – and most damning – legacies."

== Background ==
The interview was published two years after the Six-Day War, during which Israel captured the West Bank, including East Jerusalem, the Gaza Strip, the Sinai Peninsula, and the Golan Heights. Giles's question concerned the emergence of Palestinian armed groups, referred to in the interview as the fedayeen, as a new factor in the Arab–Israeli conflict.

== Interviews ==
=== Initial statement ===
The interview entitled Who can blame Israel was published in The Sunday Times on June 15, 1969, and included the following exchange:

- Frank Giles: Do you think the emergence of the Palestinian fighting forces, the Fedayeen, is an important new factor in the Middle East?
- Golda Meir: Important, no. A new factor, yes. There was no such thing as Palestinians. When was there an independent Palestinian people with a Palestinian state? It was either southern Syria before the First World War and then it was a Palestine including Jordan. It was not as though there was a Palestinian people in Palestine considering itself as a Palestinian people and we came and threw them out and took their country from them. They did not exist.

=== Later statements ===
In a 1970 interview with Thames TV:

- Golda Meir: "When were Palestinians born? What was all of this area before the First World War when Britain got the Mandate over Palestine? What was Palestine, then? Palestine was then the area between the Mediterranean and the Iraqian border. East and West Bank was Palestine. I am a Palestinian, from 1921 and 1948, I carried a Palestinian passport. There was no such thing in this area as Jews, and Arabs, and Palestinians. There were Jews and Arabs.
- Interviewer: "You deny that there was a Palestine Arab people before, but there is now a Palestine liberation movement, and the history of liberation movements are that they grow, won't this one grow and become in the end in fact your biggest enemy?"
- Golda Meir: "I don't say there are no Palestinians, but I say there is no such thing as a distinct Palestinian people."

In a 1972 interview with The New York Times, Meir was asked if she still adhered to her 1969 views. She replied: "I said there never was a Palestinian nation. The people who formerly lived in Palestine then lived for 19 years as Jordanian citizens. There were Palestinians in Gaza after 1948 but the Egyptians wouldn't give them Egyptian citizenship."

== Interpretations ==
Palestinian jurist Henry Cattan reflected on the statement in 1988:

The obliteration of the history of Palestine is now attempted by deformation of historical facts. Zionist apologists have reached a new stage in deceit by suggesting that not only the Palestinians did not exist in Palestine, but that Palestine was essentially 'uninhabited' by Arabs before the Zionist movement began towards the end of the nineteenth century, and that the Arabs came in large numbers after that, from nearby countries, drawn by the economic benefits of Jewish settlements.

Keith Kyle of the University of Ulster said in 1998 that Meir's statement

made the widespread assumption that, as undifferentiated Arabs, the former residents of Palestine might just as well make their homes anywhere in the Arab world.

Sarah Meyers of the University of Durham stated in 1999 that Meir's comments

reflected a common view of the Middle East and of public discourse of the time. It was argued that Palestinian nationalism had emerged only as a response to Zionism; whereas the Jewish claim to Palestine was deep-rooted in tradition and history.

James Gelvin, an American scholar on Middle Eastern history, commented in 2005:

The fact that Palestinian nationalism developed later than Zionism and indeed in response to it does not in any way diminish the legitimacy of Palestinian nationalism or make it less valid than Zionism. All nationalisms arise in opposition to some "other." Why else would there be the need to specify who you are? And all nationalisms are defined by what they oppose. As we have seen, Zionism itself arose in reaction to anti-Semitic and exclusionary nationalist movements in Europe. It would be perverse to judge Zionism as somehow less valid than European anti-Semitism or those nationalisms. Furthermore, Zionism itself was also defined by its opposition to the indigenous Palestinian inhabitants of the region. Both the "conquest of land" and the "conquest of labor" slogans that became central to the dominant strain of Zionism in the Yishuv originated as a result of the Zionist confrontation with the Palestinian "other."

Abraham Foxman, then head of the Anti-Defamation League, wrote in 2009 about the quote:

The complete response makes it clear that Meir was talking not about the existence of Palestinians as individuals or even as a group, but the existence of a Palestinian nation. And she was stating a simple fact - that prior to the late 1960s no one, least of all the other Arab nations, had recognized the existence or even the potential existence of such a nation. ... Could Meir have made her point more clearly? Probably. And she paid dearly for her lack of clarity. Over the years, her words have repeatedly been cited by anti-Zionists (and sometimes by outright anti-Semites) to "demonstrate" the dismissiveness of Israeli leaders toward the Palestinian People.

Barbara McKean Parmenter, a literary critic, reflected in 2010 on the statement:

In one sense she was right. There was no Palestine in the Western sense of a nation-state and no Palestinian people in the Western sense of a national group taking explicit possession of and improving its national territory. By Western definition, Palestinians, like many other native peoples around the world, did not exist.

Philip Ó Ceallaigh wrote in 2013 about the remark:

Of course, 100 years ago there was no such thing as an Israeli either. The "Israeli" and "Palestinian" nations have come into being simultaneously, and in conflict. The assertion of one is often formulated as the denial of the other."

== Legacy ==
The phrase has continued to appear in later political and scholarly discussions about Palestinian identity. In a television interview in 1973, David Ben-Gurion echoed a similar statement:

There never was a Palestinian state. There never was a Palestinian nation. There is no Palestinian religion. Was anything created by the Palestinians in the country? By the Philistines who came from Greece? And by those who are now called Philistines/Palestinians? There never was something like this.

In 2019 former Israeli MK Moshe Feiglin stated "You know, the minute you use the word 'Palestinian,' you stop saying the truth. Because there is no Palestinian nation, and they know it…once you said that this is Palestine, and once you said there are Palestinian people in this Palestine – once you said that, you created something that does not appear in reality. And now there is no solution."

Rabea Eghbariah wrote in 2024 that:

From Meir’s time to the present, Israeli politicians and other supporters of Zionism have repeatedly denied the existence of the Palestinians as a people. Israeli Minister Bezalel Smotrich, for example, recently declared, "There is no such thing as a Palestinian nation. There is no Palestinian history. There is no Palestinian language[.]"

== See also ==
- A History of the Palestinian People, an empty book that uses blank pages to suggest that Palestinians have no history.
