= Awosika =

Awosika is a surname. Notable people with the surname include:

- Ajoritsedere Awosika (born c. 1953), Nigerian banker
- Ibukun Awosika (born 1962), Nigerian business woman, author, and motivational speaker
- Kayode Awosika (born 1998), Nigerian American football player
