= Marchioness of Bath =

British title

- Incumbent; Emma since 4 April 2020
- Style: The Most Honourable
- Member of: Thynn family
- Term length: As long as married to the Marquess of Bath
- Formation: 1789
- First holder: Elizabeth Bentinck

Marchioness of Bath is the principal courtesy title of the wife of the Marquess of Bath.

== Countesses of Bath (England, 1536-1654) ==
Countess	Image	Earl	Married	Became countess	Ceased to be countess	Died
Cecily Daubeny		1st	Unknown			
Florence Bonville		1st	Unknown			
Elizabeth Wentworth		1st	Unknown			
Eleanor Manners		2nd	Before 25 May 1524	30 April 1539	Before 4 December 1548	
Margaret Donnington		2nd	4 December 1548		10 February 1561	1562
Mary Cornwallis		3rd	15 December 1578		28 April 1581	Unknown
Elizabeth Russell		3rd	1583		1605	
Dorothy St John		4th	14 July 1623		20 August 1632	
Ann Lovett		4th	1633		31 March 1636	Unknown
Rachel Fane		5th	13 December 1638		16 August 1654	11 November 1680

== Countesses of Bath (England, 1661-1711) ==
Countess	Image	Earl	Married	Became countess	Ceased to be countess	Died
Jane Wyche		1st	October 1652	1661	1692	

== Countesses of Bath (Great Britain, 1742-1764) ==
Countess	Image	Earl	Married	Became countess	Ceased to be countess	Died
Anna Maria Gumley		1st	27 December 1714	14 July 1742	14 September 1758	

== Marchionesses of Bath (Great Britain, 1789-present) ==
Marchioness	Image	Marquess	Married	Became marchioness	Ceased to be marchioness	Died
Elizabeth Bentinck		1st	22 March 1759	18 August 1789	19 November 1796	12 December 1825
Isabella Byng		2nd	14 April 1794	19 November 1796	1 May 1830	
Harriet Baring		3rd	19 April 1830	27 March 1837	24 June 1837	1892
Frances Vesey		4th	20 August 1861		20 April 1896	Unknown
Violet Mordaunt		5th	19 April 1890	20 April 1896	May 1928	
Daphne Vivian		6th	27 October 1927	9 June 1946	1953	5 December 1997
Virginia Parsons		6th	15 July 1953		30 June 1992	2003
Anna Gyarmathy		7th	1969	30 June 1992	4 April 2020	17 September 2022
Emma McQuiston		8th	8 June 2013	4 April 2020	Incumbent	
