= Kingdown School =

Location
- Woodcock Road; Warminster, Wiltshire, BA12 9DR; England
- Coordinates: 51°12′09″N 2°09′50″W

Information
- Type: Academy
- Motto: Believe, Aspire, Achieve
- Religious affiliation: Secular
- Department for Education URN: 137230 Tables
- Headteacher: Helen Carpenter
- Gender: Mixed
- Age: 11 to 18
- Enrolment: 1,591 As of January 2022
- Houses: Lords; Millennium; Twickenham; Wembley; Wimbledon; Silverstone
- Website: www.kingdown.wilts.sch.uk

Kingdown School is a mixed secondary school and sixth form in Warminster, Wiltshire, England for students aged 11 to 18. Since 1 August 2011, the school has been an academy.

== History ==
Kingdown School was built in 1960 in the east of Warminster as a replacement for the Avenue and Sambourne secondary modern schools. It became a comprehensive in 1973 and gained academy status in 2011.

In 1986, 50-year-old mathematics teacher Heather Arnold killed 39-year-old Jeanne Sutcliffe and her 8-month-old daughter Heidi Sutcliffe in their home in Westbury using an axe. She later admitted to psychologists that she "hated" Mrs Sutcliffe because she wanted to be closer to Sutcliffe's husband, Paul Sutcliffe, a fellow mathematics teacher at Kingdown.

In 2002, Channel 4 attempted to produce a fly on the wall documentary about life as a sixth former in the school, but staff ordered the show's production to stop after it was discovered that the 17-year-old Howard Simmons the show was following was in fact Sheridan Simove (30 years old at the time), who was also the producer of the documentary, which had not been disclosed to the school staff before filming had started.

The school is run by Acorn Educational Trust, which manages several primary schools in the area as well as (from September 2018) The Clarendon Academy, a secondary school in the town of Trowbridge.

== Houses ==
In September 2006, Kingdown adopted a house system, aimed at giving students a sense of community, family, and belonging, and eliminating hostile subcultures by allowing older students to provide a positive role model. Originally there were five houses, each named after a notable British sporting venue and led by a Head of House. In 2017 a sixth house, Silverstone, was added.

Each House consists of about a sixth of the students from each of Years 7 to 13, so about 280 students altogether. There are also tutor groups, each with approximately twenty-four students: four from each of Years 7 to 12/13, who meet their tutor for 20 minutes on every school day, beginning at 10.30 am. Members of each House come together for a house assembly once a week. Siblings are put into the same House, but usually not into the same tutor group.

== Ofsted and academic achievements ==
The school was awarded dual specialisms in Sports and Applied Learning, also achieving Artsmark Silver and Sportsmark Gold awards. In its 2003 report, Ofsted rated the school "good" overall, rating the quality of education as "very good". The 2008 inspection rated both the school and sixth form "outstanding". Following the 2013 inspection its rating had returned to "good", on which the school commented "It is very hard to compare previous (2008) and current inspections (2013) not least as the four headings are a new addition since 2008 and the bar to achieve an outstanding rating has truly been raised".

== Notable staff ==
John Atyeo (1932–1993), prolific goal-scorer for Bristol City who also scored for England, taught mathematics after retiring from football and rose to deputy headmaster.

== Notable pupils ==
- Ceawlin Thynn, 8th Marquess of Bath
- Nathan Thompson, footballer
