= Emma Thynn, Marchioness of Bath =

British noblewoman and fashion model (born 1986)

The Most Honourable The Marchioness of Bath
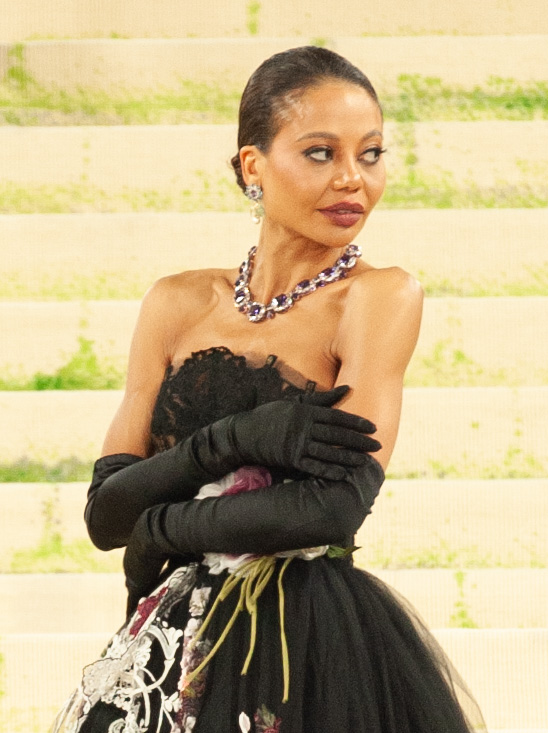
- Lady Bath at the 2026 Met Gala

Personal details
- Born: Emma Clare McQuiston; 26 March 1986 (age 40) South Kensington, London, England
- Spouse: Ceawlin Thynn, 8th Marquess of Bath (m. 2013)
- Children: 2
- Parents: Oladipo Jadesimi; Suzanna McQuiston
- Education: University College London; London Academy of Music and Dramatic Art
- Occupation: Aristocrat; socialite; model; television personality

Emma Clare Thynn, Marchioness of Bath (née McQuiston; born 26 March 1986), styled as Viscountess Weymouth from 2013 to 2020, is a British aristocrat, socialite, model, and television personality. She is married to Ceawlin Thynn, 8th Marquess of Bath and is the first Black marchioness in the British peerage. Thynn competed on the reality television shows Strictly Come Dancing, Pointless, and Celebrity MasterChef before becoming a cast member on Ladies of London: The New Reign in 2026.

== Early life and education ==
Thynn was born on 26 March 1986, in London, the daughter of a Nigerian father and an English mother. Her father, Chief Oladipo Jadesimi, is a Nigerian oil billionaire who is the executive chairman of Lagos Deep Offshore Logistics Company and a titleholder in the Nigerian chieftaincy system, while her mother, Suzanna McQuiston, is an English socialite. As a result of an affair between her parents, her father did not live with the family, but she has reported having a positive relationship with him. She has several half-siblings, including Amy Jadesimi.

She was raised in South Kensington. She was head girl at Queen's Gate School during her secondary education and later attended University College London to study art history. After university, she studied classical acting at the London Academy of Music and Dramatic Art.

== Career ==
After her marriage, she became chatelaine of Longleat's estate and safari park. There, she founded the food and lifestyle brand Emma's Kitchen. She was featured alongside her husband in All Change at Longleat, a three-part documentary filmed in 2014 and broadcast on BBC One in September 2015.

In 2017, she became a brand ambassador for Fiorucci. She also modelled for Dolce & Gabbana, walking in runway shows at Harrods.

In February 2018, Thynn began working as a fashion editor at British Vogue. She is also contributing editor at HuffPost.

From September 2019, she was a contestant in the 17th series of the BBC television programme Strictly Come Dancing, partnered with professional dancer Aljaž Škorjanec. The couple were eliminated in week seven. She became involved in a voting controversy after a staff member at Longleat House offered to pay for colleagues' votes in her support.

On 18 September 2021, she was a contestant alongside Lauren Steadman in the "Strictly" celebrities special of Pointless; her duo was the first eliminated duo of the episode.

In 2023, Emma and her husband, Ceawlin Thynn, 8th Marquess of Bath, hosted Prince Edward, Duke of Edinburgh, at Longleat House. The visit was part of the Rededication of the 43rd Wessex Division Service held at Longleat, the family seat of the Marquesses of Bath. Prince Edward met with the Marquess and Marchioness of Bath and their two sons, John Thynn, Viscount Weymouth, and Lord Henry Thynn.

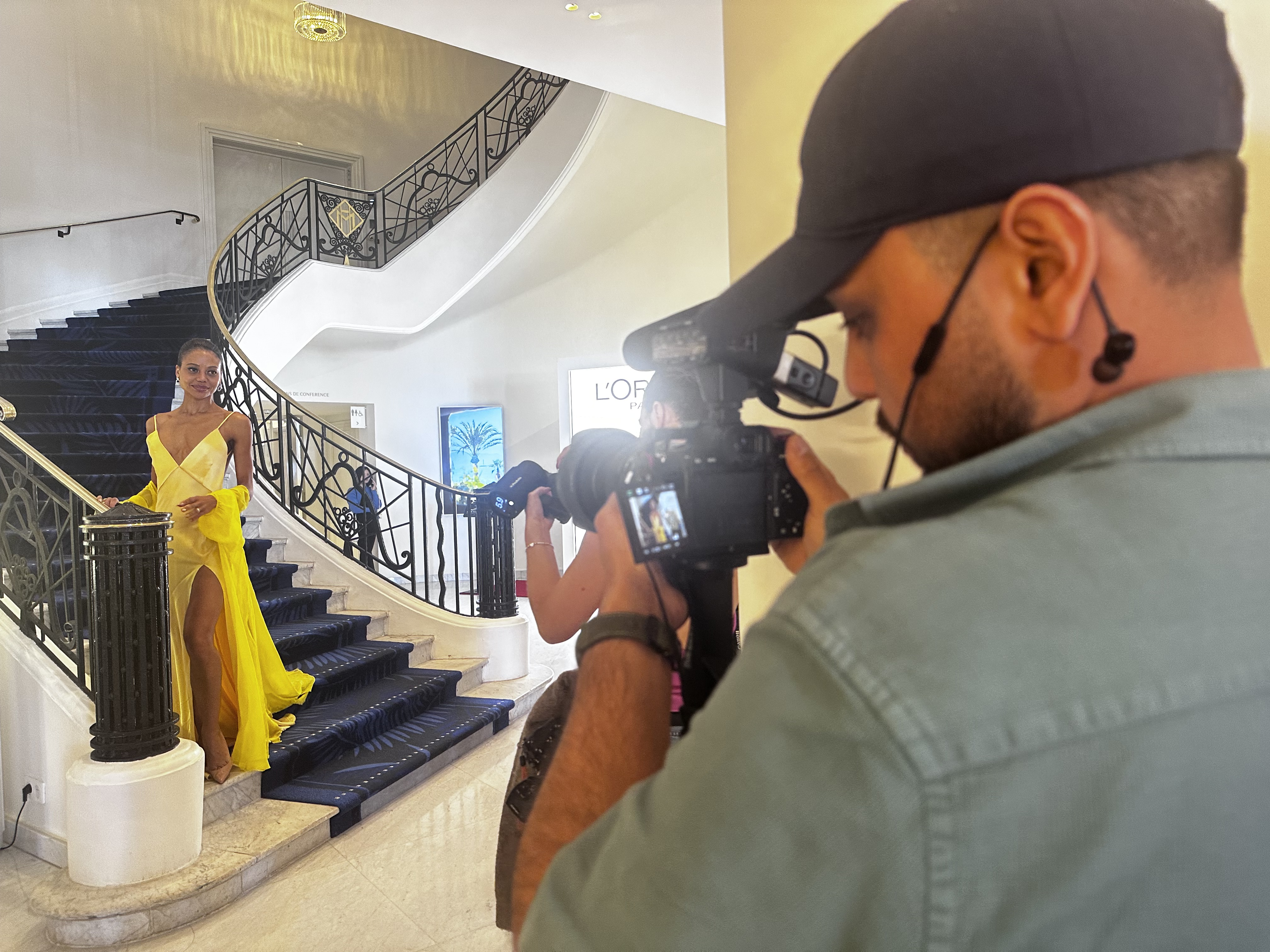
Thynn at a photo shoot in the lobby of the Hôtel Martinez in 2026

In August 2024, Thynn took part in the nineteenth series of Celebrity MasterChef on BBC One, where she was eliminated in the third heat. The same year, Emma was announced as an ambassador for Victoria’s Secret. The campaign featuring Thynn was filmed at Longleat, her family's estate in Wiltshire. Her appointment was part of the company’s broader efforts to update its brand image. In 2025, Thynn was named "Best Hostess" in Tatler's Country House Awards. In 2026, Thynn joined the cast of the reality television series Ladies of London: The New Reign, which premiered on Bravo on 5 March 2026.

== Personal life ==
She met Ceawlin when she was four and he was 16, at the wedding of her half-brother Iain McQuiston to Ceawlin’s aunt, Lady Silvy Cerne Thynne. Over the following two decades, they saw each other only occasionally at large family gatherings.

She and Ceawlin Thynn, Viscount Weymouth married on 8 June 2013, in a ceremony attended by 355 guests. Upon her marriage, she became Viscountess Weymouth. The wedding drew attention due to the absence of her in-laws. It was reported that Lady Bath did not attend, with some speculating that she felt the marriage would affect the family's heritage.

Emma Thynn, Marchioness of Bath, and her husband Ceawlin Thynn, 8th Marquess of Bath, have two sons, John Alexander Ladi Thynn (born 2014, heir apparent) and Henry Richard Isaac Thynn (born 2016), whose godmother is Lady Kitty Spencer, niece of Diana, Princess of Wales.

In 2016, Emma became the first member of the British aristocracy to have a child via surrogacy after medical advice indicated potential health risks associated with pregnancy; her second son was delivered at a private clinic in the United States. The couple opted for surrogacy after Emma was diagnosed with a brain bleed and a pituitary gland disorder during her first pregnancy. The condition caused significant pain and led to the baby being delivered by caesarean section. Medical professionals advised that a second pregnancy could pose serious health risks.

When her husband succeeded his father as the Marquess of Bath in 2020, she became the first biracial marchioness in British history.
