= Political Achievements of the Earl of Dalkeith =

Political pamphlet containing blank pages

The 32 blank pages of the pamphlet have been digitised by the LSE Library.

The Political Achievements of the Earl of Dalkeith was a political pamphlet that was published and circulated in Edinburgh during the 1880 United Kingdom general election. It was well presented but inside the neatly printed cover there were just thirty-two blank pages, making it an early empty book.

The publication was thought to be an effective attack on William Montagu Douglas Scott, then Earl of Dalkeith by courtesy (later 6th Duke of Buccleuch). He was the Conservative MP for the Midlothian constituency, and lost the seat to William Ewart Gladstone by 211 votes.
