= The Ballad of Spiro Agnew =

Tom Paxton song

Song by John Denver
- Length: 0:15
- Songwriter: Tom Paxton

"The Ballad of Spiro Agnew" is a song originally written by American folk singer-songwriter Tom Paxton.

It was covered by John Denver on his 1969 album Rhymes & Reasons.

The same album also contained "The Ballad of Richard Nixon" which was five seconds of silence.

== See also ==
- Empty book
