= Laura Pulteney, 1st Countess of Bath =

British peeress and heiress

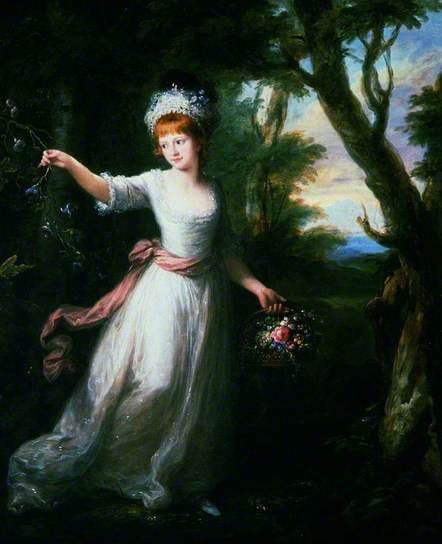
Portrait of Henrietta Laura Pulteney by Angelica Kauffmann, ca. 1777. Bath, The Holburne Museum.

(Henrietta) Laura Pulteney, 1st Countess of Bath (26 December 1766 – 14 July 1808) was a British peeress and heiress.

== Early life ==
Pultney was born Henrietta Laura Johnstone in Westminster, the only child of the wealthy William Johnstone, later Sir William Pulteney, 5th Baronet, and his wife, Frances Pulteney, daughter of Daniel Pulteney. They moved to Bath House on Piccadilly, where she was raised. On her mother's death in 1782, she inherited the Pulteney estates. Initially educated at home, Pulteney was educated at the convent of Montparnasse in Paris, completing it in 1783. There she was visited by her kinswoman, the Countess of Hopetoun, her friend Lady Belmore and the Countess of Dundonald, the latter of whom introduced her to Parisian society. As a young woman, Pulteney spent time at Sudborough in Northamptonshire (later endowing a school there as well as in Clewer, Berkshire) where her neighbour was Archibald Alison, to whom she agreed to be a godmother to his son, William.

== Peerage and marriage ==
Although Pulteney's father never sought political office, he did procure a peerage for her and she was created Baroness of Bath, in the County of Somerset, in 1792, aged twenty-six. Despite her mother's family having previously held the earldom of Bath until its extinction in 1764, a marquessate of Bath had been created for the 3rd Viscount Weymouth in 1789. Some peers attempted to have her peerage cancelled due to the unprecedented use of the same place name in two separate peerages for separate people. This was rejected and she was further elevated as Countess of Bath, in the County of Somerset, in 1803, although it is a general rule that, wherever possible, peerage titles should not be duplicated. On 17 July 1794, she married her father's first cousin, Sir James Murray, 7th Baronet and he took the additional surname of Pulteney.

== Later years ==
When Lady Bath's father died intestate in 1805, his personal estate was divided between her and his second wife. Lady Bath inherited two thirds and property in England and America. She died aged 41 just over three years later in Brighton, possibly from consumption and was buried in the south cloister of Westminster Abbey. Her personal estate passed to her cousin, Elizabeth Evelyn Fawcett (daughter of Sir Richard Sutton, 1st Baronet and ex-wife of George Markham, Dean of York); she and her husband changed their name to Pulteney. Their daughter was Isabelle Pulteney Fawcett, married firstly to a Swiss banker of the de Palezieux dit Falconnet family, and secondly in 1864 to Nicola Serra Count of Montesantangelo. Her landed estates passed to William Vane, 3rd Earl of Darlington. As she had no children, her titles became extinct.

== Namesakes ==
The town of Henrietta, New York, where her father invested in land, was named for her.

The octagonal tower built by Thomas Telford in about 1790 as a summer house at Shrewsbury Castle is called 'Laura's Tower' after her. Telford was engaged by her father to remodel the castle as his Shrewsbury home.

== Sources ==
- Rowe, M. J. and McBryde, W. H. – Pulteney (formerly Johnstone), (Henrietta) Laura, suo jure countess of Bath (1766–1808), heiress – Oxford Dictionary of National Biography

Peerage of Great Britain
New creation	Baroness of Bath; 1792–1808	Extinct
Peerage of the United Kingdom
New creation	Countess of Bath; 1803–1808	Extinct
