= Empty book =

Novelty book containing blank pages

Empty books or blank books are novelty books whose title indicates that they treat some serious subject, but whose pages have been left intentionally blank. The joke is that "nothing" is the answer to whatever the title of the book asserts.

A number of such titles have been published as attempts at satire or polemic, to some commercial success. In 2017, The Guardian commented that the trend of publishing political empty books had led to "the noble art of political parody [descending] into a one-joke turn that avoids words".

== List of empty books ==
The 32 blank pages of the Political Achievements of the Earl of Dalkeith have been digitised by the LSE Library.

This list includes, in order of publication, empty books that have been published with an ISBN or have received coverage in reliable sources unrelated to the author. The books may have book design features such as front matter, a table of contents, page numbers, etc., as long as the pages are otherwise blank.

- A record of the statesmanship and political achievements of Gen. Winfield Scott Hancock, regular Democratic nominee for president of the United States (1880). A political pamphlet attacking Winfield Scott Hancock, Democratic nominee for President of the United States in 1880.
- Political Achievements of the Earl of Dalkeith (1880). A political pamphlet attacking William Montagu Douglas Scott, 6th Duke of Buccleuch. Prime Minister of the United Kingdom William Ewart Gladstone, a Liberal, defeated the Conservative Douglas Scott in an upset victory at Midlothian.
- Anonymous (1968): All of the Accomplishments of Spiro Agnew, parodying Maryland governor and at the time of publishing Richard Nixon's, running mate, Spiro Agnew, possibly the inspiration of The Ballad of Spiro Agnew.
- Sussol, Max (1986). O Que Se Pode Fazer Sexualmente Após 80 Anos (translated from Brazilian Portuguese: "What can you do sexually after 80 years old"). One hundred twenty empty pages. ISBN 979-0090017033.
- Simove, Sheridan (2011). What Every Man Thinks About Apart from Sex. Summersdale. ISBN 978-1849531986. Popular among British university students who used it as a notebook.
- Ferguson, Rich (16 March 2011). What Men Know About Women. Self-published. ISBN 978-1460993781. There are several variations on this theme, e.g. Everything Men Know About Women by Alan Francis.
- Moncrief, Jimmy (2011). Everything Obama Knows About the Economy. Self-published. ISBN 978-0980074239.
- Simove, Sheridan (1 August 2012). Fifty Shades of Gray. Self-published. ISBN 978-0956827845. This was a collection of 200 blank pages in various shades of the color gray. Removed from circulation after legal action by the publisher of the novel Fifty Shades of Grey.
- Cuthbertson, Steven J. (1 June 2014). The Wit and Wisdom of Nigel Farage. Ebury Press. ISBN 978-0091960094. Angered UK Independence Party supporters who bought it in the belief that it contained actual pronouncements by Nigel Farage.
- Alystiam, Ann (25 November 2016). Surprising Reasons to Believe Trump Will Be a Great President!. Self-published. ISBN 978-0991068944. Authored by former Oregon First Lady Cylvia Hayes, under a pseudonym.
- King, David (30 November 2016). Why Trump Deserves Trust, Respect and Admiration. Self-published. ISBN 978-1540743220.
- Knowles, Michael J. (8 February 2017). Reasons to Vote for Democrats: A Comprehensive Guide. Self-published. ISBN 978-1543024975. A bestseller on Amazon.com and promoted on Twitter by Donald Trump.
- Voll, Assaf (12 June 2017). A History of the Palestinian People. Self-published. ISBN 978-1546831242. A "bestseller on Amazon.com" (where it was the 543rd most sold book), until it was removed

== See also ==
- Blank piece of paper
- Silent music
- "The Unsuccessful Self-Treatment of a Case of 'Writer's Block'"
- Wordless Book
