= The House of the Missing Girls =

- Directed by: Jean-François Davy
- Written by: Jean-François Davy; Michel Lévine
- Starring: Anna Gaël; Hans Meyer; Roland Lesaffre
- Cinematography: Daniel Lacambre
- Music by: Jack Arel
- Distributed by: VIP Distributing
- Release date: 1969
- Running time: 92 minutes
- Country: France
- Language: French

The House of the Missing Girls (French: Traquenards; "Traps") is a 1969 French film directed by Jean-François Davy and starring Anna Gaël, Hans Meyer, and Roland Lesaffre. It follows a woman who becomes the moll of a possessive mobster. The film was distributed in the United States by VIP Distributing, who dubbed the film in English and edited the film significantly, releasing it in the United States as The House of the Missing Girls.

== Cast ==
- Anna Gaël as Agnès
- Hans Meyer as Varen
- Roland Lesaffre as Bob
- Jean-Claude Charnay as Robinson
- Robert Lombard as Georges Corbeaux
- Dominique Erlanger as Olga
