= A History of the Palestinian People =

2017 empty book by Assaf Voll

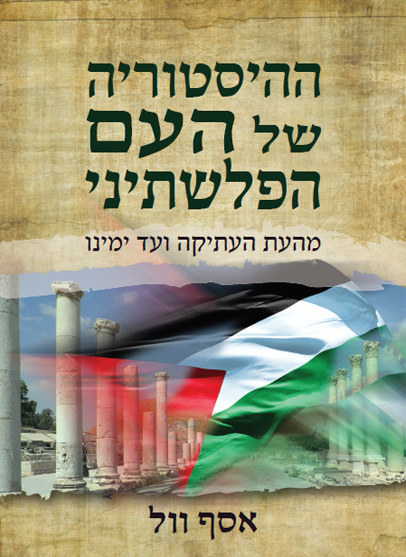
- A History of the Palestinian People
- Author: Assaf Voll
- Original title: A History of the Palestinian People: From Ancient Times to the Modern Era
- Translator: Alan Slater (English)
- Language: English, Hebrew
- Subject: Empty book
- Publisher: CreateSpace Independent Publishing Platform
- Publication date: June 12, 2017
- Publication place: United States / Israel
- Media type: Print (paperback)
- Pages: 132 (English), 120 (Hebrew)
- ISBN: 978-1546831242
- Website: palhistory.com

A History of the Palestinian People: From Ancient Times to the Modern Era is an empty book by Assaf Voll that uses blank pages to suggest that Palestinians have no history. It has continued to circulate on social media among the Israeli right-wing.

It was published in paperback and digital formats in 2017, and most of its contents are blank pages. The book rose in Amazon.com's best-selling titles in the category of "Israel and Palestine History", reaching second place (Note: It is possible the book reached #1 briefly (just before the sale stopped), as there are multiple less reliable sources claiming this (including screenshots); however, reliable source attribution for the #1 claim is lacking whereas #2 is well sourced.) before it was pulled from sale by Amazon. Its publication has been described as a "cruel joke". The incident has been said to signify "the continued vitality of a more enduring political, social and cultural impulse to abrogate Palestinian history and identity – on the part of Israel, and by extension, among its Western allies."

== Contents summary ==
Besides the front cover, back cover, and title page the book contains a quote attributed to the Seinfeld character George Costanza: "Just remember, it's not a lie if you believe it." The rest of its pages are blank. The Hebrew version of 120 pages is shorter than the 132-page English version. Voll said a planned German version will be significantly longer.

== Composition and publication ==
Voll is a columnist for Israeli publications, and involved in public relations and advertising. Holding an M.A. in Jewish Studies from Haifa University, Voll has also lectured at the university as an external lecturer.

The book was described by its author as "a fruit of many years of research" and "the most comprehensive and extensive review of some 3,000 years of Palestinian history, with emphasis on the Palestinian people's unique contribution to the world and to humanity". Interviewed on the Kol Chai radio station, Voll stated: "The Palestinian people believe they are a people, and someone needs to tell them the truth even if it hurts. Look what happens when they were given the feeling that they are a real people."

== Reception ==
=== Support ===
Promoted by American weekly The Jewish Press, the book also received positive user reviews and rankings. It sold well for books related to the Middle East on Amazon.com, quickly reaching the second place in the category of "Israel and Palestine History", and 9th in "Middle East History". Positive reviews appeared on Jewish Voice, Channel 20 (Israel), Arutz 7, Hamodia, "Kipa" and "Srugim".

Addressing Arab members of Knesset in a speech, deputy Minister of Foreign Affairs Tzipi Hotovely held up the Tanakh in one hand and A History of the Palestinian People in the other saying "I recommend to UNESCO and to the Arab Knesset members to read these two books, the Bible which tells the story of the Jewish people, and Assaf Voll's new bestseller, A History of the Palestinian People: From Ancient Times to the Modern Era. It will captivate you because it is empty. Because the Palestinians don't have kings and they don't have heritage sites". In a later interview Hotovely has said that the book is a wonderful PR exercise and that while there is definitely an Arab, Ottoman and Muslim history, the Palestinians were never a nation and that the basis of the Palestinian narrative is denying the Jewish one, by disseminating lies and attempting to rewrite history.

=== Criticism ===
The publication was heavily criticized as racist, with organizations such as IfNotNow asking their followers to contact Amazon and complain. The book faced some customer complaints and low ratings on Amazon.

In a column published by Mondoweiss, Jonathan Cook wrote that the book had antecedents, in 1969, Golda Meir declared to the world: "There was no such thing as Palestinians" and that in 1984 the book From Time Immemorial claimed Palestinians were recent economically motivated immigrants. Furthermore, Cook wrote "Israelis have been only too happy to make the Palestinians vanish."

Joshua Shanes writing in Haaretz said that nations are a result of modernity and that "no nation—as we currently understand and use the term—dates to antiquity, not even the Jews." According to Shanes the formation of Palestinian nationhood occurred lockstep with the formation of Jewish nationhood in the 19th century, but this does not say either are "invented" and that in any event the Palestinians today, regardless of their historical origin, are a nation. An attempt to deny the existence of the opposing side is a path to irreconcilable conflict. In a separate review on Haaretz it was claimed that "The author's argument that the Palestinians are not a people because they are void of history isn't new – it's a mainstay of the Israeli right".

In an article in The Jewish Journal of Greater Los Angeles, Professor Steven Weitzman of the Center for Advanced Judaic Studies said that Voll's book is Shlomo Sand's The Invention of the Jewish People argument in reverse applied to Palestinians instead of Jews. Weitzman further said "What was offensive about the book is that it is completely blank, the author's way of arguing that the Palestinians are not a real people and have no real history—an argument that other scholars have made in more conventional ways".

Ahmed Dabesh in the Lebanese daily newspaperAl Akhbar wrote that Voll didn't mention that the "Zionist entity" was born out of aggression against the Palestinians and the rape of their land, attacked the Zionist Archaeology policy, and asserted that the Palestinians have roots dating back at least to the Stone Age.

Conversely, on Arab News Network it was claimed the Palestinians have Canaanite roots dating back at least 4500 years, and that the book is an unsuccessful response to the Occupied Palestine Resolution in UNESCO.

A review in Al-Modon said that Israel is empty as the book is empty, that the book is part of continuing Zionist methodology of claiming that Palestine is a land without a people, the same methodology that led the Zionists to steal the Palestinian cuisine and claim worldwide that hummus and falafel are Israeli inventions.

A review in the Egyptian Youm7 said the book is part of a continuing provocation and fabrication against the Arab identity of the Palestinian people, the Palestinian land, and the holy places.

An An-Najah National University publication said the book was written from a vantage point of supposed "superiority" and exhibits the "innermost subconscious of the Israeli methodology" and that furthermore American conscious and unconscious sympathy to Israel arises from the American genocide of Native Americans as exhibited by Munir Akash's book, America and genocides – the right to sacrifice the other.

The Bosnian newspaper Oslobođenje, in an article on the Palestinian-Israel anniversaries marked in 2017, said that the book is not just a distant echo of Golda Meir's statement "there is no such thing as Palestinians", but also the attitude of the current right-wing Israeli politicians, despite Palestine gaining recognition by the United Nations.

== Removal from sale ==
Amazon stopped selling the book in June 2017, removing it entirely from their site, though the book remained on sale elsewhere. Amazon in a letter to Voll said:

During a quality assurance review of your CSP catalogue, we found that your book(s) are resulting in a disappointing customer experience. Indicators of a poor customer experience may include customer refunds and feedback. As a result, the following book(s) have been removed from sale on Amazon.

In response, Voll said that there were other blank books on sale in Amazon, giving the best-seller Reasons To Vote For Democrats as an example, that there was no intention to deceive anyone regarding the contents of the book, and that some of the poor customer feedback was due to a campaign by anti-Israel activists such as the website "Welcome to Palestine".

The book reached 16th place in sales on the Barnes & Noble site, before being removed from sale from this site as well.
