= Festus Okotie-Eboh =

Nigerian politician (1912–1966)

Chief Festus Okotie Eboh
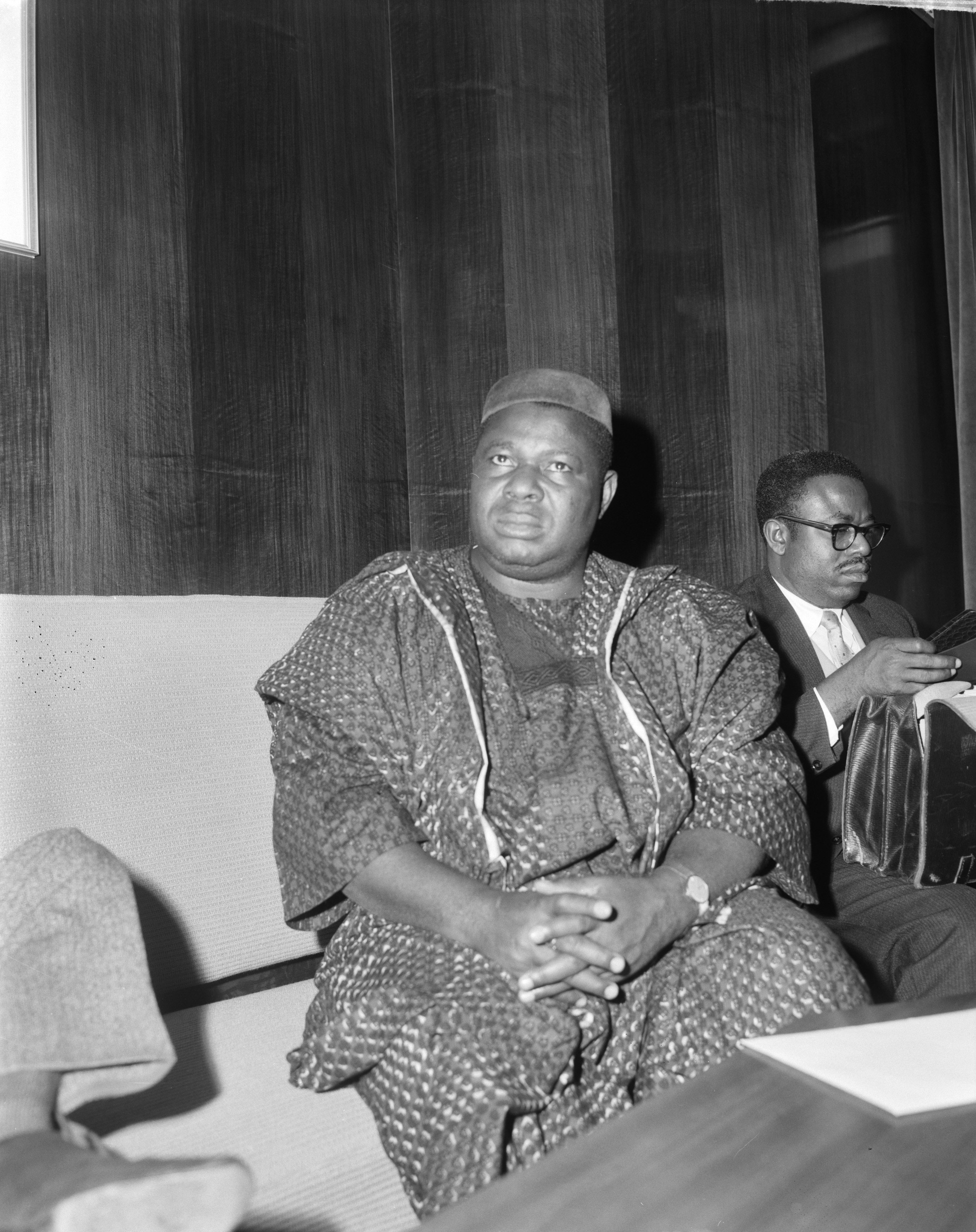
- Okotie-Eboh in 1963

Minister of Finance
- In office 1957 – 15 January 1966
- Prime Minister: Abubakar Tafawa Balewa
- Preceded by: Position established
- Succeeded by: Obafemi Awolowo

Minister of Labour and Social Welfare
- In office 1955–1957
- Prime Minister: Abubakar Tafawa Balewa
- Preceded by: Position established
- Succeeded by: Position abolished

Personal details
- Born: Festus Samuel Eboh; 18 July 1912 Warri, Southern Nigeria Protectorate
- Died: 15 January 1966 (aged 53)
- Party: National Council of Nigeria and the Cameroons
- Children: 9, including Ajoritsedere Awosika (daughter)
- Relatives: Oladipo Jadesimi (son-in-law); Amy Jadesimi (granddaughter)
- Occupation: Politician

Chief Festus Okotie-Eboh (18 July 1912 – 15 January 1966) was a Nigerian politician who was the finance minister of Nigeria from 1957 to 1966 during the administration of Sir Abubakar Tafawa Balewa.

Okotie-Eboh was born to an Itsekiri Chief, Prince Okotie Eboh in Warri, a town along the Benin River in Niger Delta. He was a National Treasurer of the Nigerian First Republic party, NCNC. He was also a leader of the Federal Parliamentary Party of NCNC, replacing K.O. Mbadiwe.

== Early life and business career ==
Okotie Eboh was born Festus Samuel Edah in Benin River, Old Warri division. From 1932 to 1936, he attended Sapele Baptist School. Upon graduation, he clerked briefly in the Local District Office before returning to his alma mater as a teacher. In 1937, he gained employment at Bata Shoe Company as an accounting clerk.

While working as a clerk, he was also studying bookkeeping and accounting. In 1944, Bata transferred him to Lagos as a Chief Clerk and West Coast Accountant. He was in Lagos for a year before returning to Sapele to become Deputy Manager of the Sapele branch. In 1947, he was sent to Prague, Czechoslovakia for further training where he obtained a diploma in business administration and chiropody. He left Bata Shoe to establish a timber and rubber business. He was involved in a rubber exporting business trading under the company name of Afro-Nigerian Export and Import Company. The firm exported ribbed smoked sheet rubber to Europe and North America. In 1958, he opened a rubber-creping factory and later in 1963, he started Omimi Rubber and Canvas Shoe factory. He also started a few ventures with two foreign partners: Dizengoff and Coutinho Caro. The partners promoted Mid-West Cement Co, a cement clinker plant in Koko and Unameji Cabinet Works.

Okotie-Eboh married in 1942, and, together with his wife, started a string of schools in Sapele. The first school was Sapele Boys Academy, followed with Zik's College of Commerce. In 1953, he started Sapele Academy Secondary School. In the 1940s and 1950s, Okotie-Eboh was a board member of Warri Ports Advisory Committee, Sapele Township Advisory Board and Sapele Town Planning Authority.

== Political career ==
In 1951, after some influence from Azikiwe, he contested a seat and was elected to the Western Region House of Assembly. In 1954, he was elected treasurer of the N.C.N.C. and was successful as the party's candidate to represent Warri division in the House of Representatives. He was nominated as the Federal Minister of Labour and Welfare in January, 1955, and two years later, he was made Finance Minister.

== Personal life ==
Okotie-Eboh married an Itsekiri woman named Victoria in 1942. One of his daughters, Alero, married Oladipo Jadesimi. His youngest daughter, Ajoritsedere Awosika, was a former civil servant. He was also said to be married to another itsekiri woman named Irene Dorti.

== Death ==
Okotie-Eboh was assassinated along with Prime Minister Tafawa Balewa in the military coup of 15 January 1966, which terminated the Nigerian First Republic. Two days before Okotie-Eboh's death, he met with Lee Kuan Yew. Lee said in a speech in 1993 that before his death, Okotie-Eboh was planning to leave government to focus on a starting a shoe factory.
