= Michael Knowles (political commentator) =

American political commentator and author (born 1990)

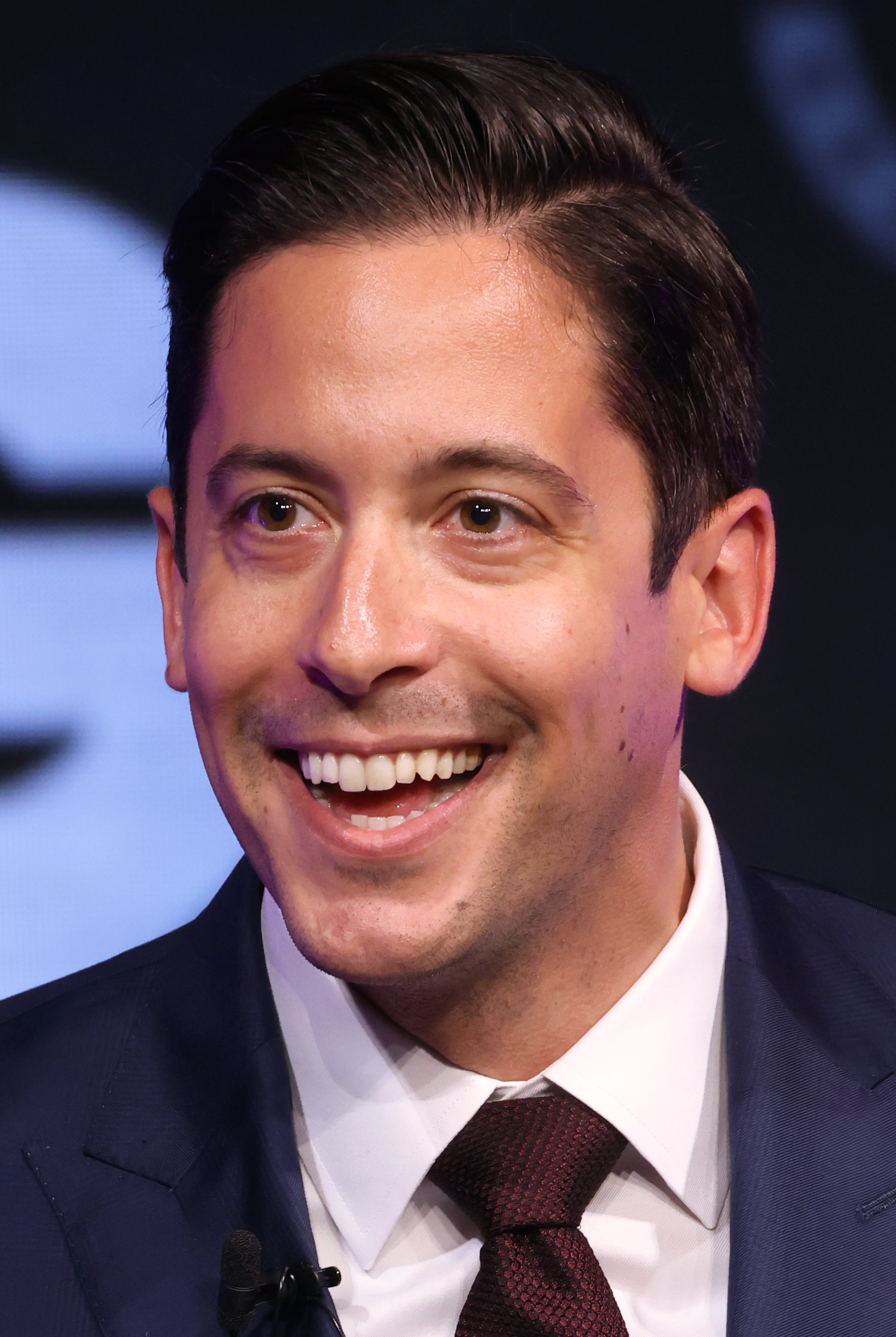
- Knowles in 2025
- Born: Michael John Knowles; March 18, 1990 (age 36); Bedford Hills, New York, U.S.
- Education: Yale University (BA)
- Occupations: Political commentator; media host; author
- Notable work: Reasons to Vote for Democrats: A Comprehensive Guide
- Movement: Conservatism
- Spouse: Alissa Mahler (m. 2018)
- Children: 4

YouTube information
- Channel: Michael Knowles
- Years active: 2016–present
- Genres: Politics; culture; podcast
- Subscribers: 2.61 million
- Views: 1.403 billion
- Last updated: September 7, 2026
- Website: michaeljknowles.com

Michael John Knowles (born March 18, 1990) is an American conservative political commentator, author, and media host. He has been affiliated with The Daily Wire since 2016, where he has hosted The Michael Knowles Show, a daily political podcast, since 2017.

Knowles was born and raised in Bedford Hills, New York. A graduate of Yale University, Knowles previously trained as an actor and appeared in several independent film and web productions before turning to political media. His early prominence came in 2017 with the publication of Reasons to Vote for Democrats, a satirical book consisting of blank pages that became a bestseller. He published a second book, Speechless, in 2021.

Knowles is a frequent speaker and commentator within conservative circles and has been involved in projects including Verdict with Ted Cruz, a podcast he co-hosted with U.S. senator Ted Cruz from 2020 to 2022.

== Early life and education ==
Knowles grew up in Bedford Hills, New York. He is of Irish and Italian descent. He attended Fox Lane High School in Bedford. During his time in high school, Knowles' mother died.

In 2008, Knowles enrolled at Yale University and graduated with honors in 2012, double majoring in history and Italian literature. In college, he was a contributor to the Yale Daily News, an inaugural student fellow of the William F. Buckley Jr. Program, and produced the first English rendering of Niccolò Machiavelli's play Andria.

Knowles was raised in the Catholic faith by his family but fell away during his adolescence, crediting in part the emergence of Christopher Hitchens and New Atheism. While attending Yale, he experienced a reconversion to the Church, spurred by ontological arguments from Alvin Plantinga and literature from authors like C.S. Lewis and G.K. Chesterton.

As a Yale student, Knowles became involved in politics, co-founding the Students for Daniels organization, which sought to nominate Indiana governor Mitch Daniels for the 2012 United States presidential election; the group later endorsed Jon Huntsman, with Knowles becoming his national youth co-chair. He also worked for Congresswoman Nan Hayworth in supporting her campaign for reelection, founded a political consulting group in senior year, and created sketches with Jimmy McMillan.

== Career ==
=== Acting ===
Knowles began training as an actor when he was 7 years old and studied at the Stella Adler Studio of Acting. Knowles pursued acting in college. His appearance in the 2012 student film House of Shades as a queer man who seduces another man attracted attention from several media outlets in 2023 after comments Knowles made about transgender people. Upon graduation from Yale, Knowles trained with Wynn Handman at his acting studio in New York City. Knowles starred in various television movies, music videos, and web series, frequently flying between New York and Los Angeles for his career.

=== Political commentary ===
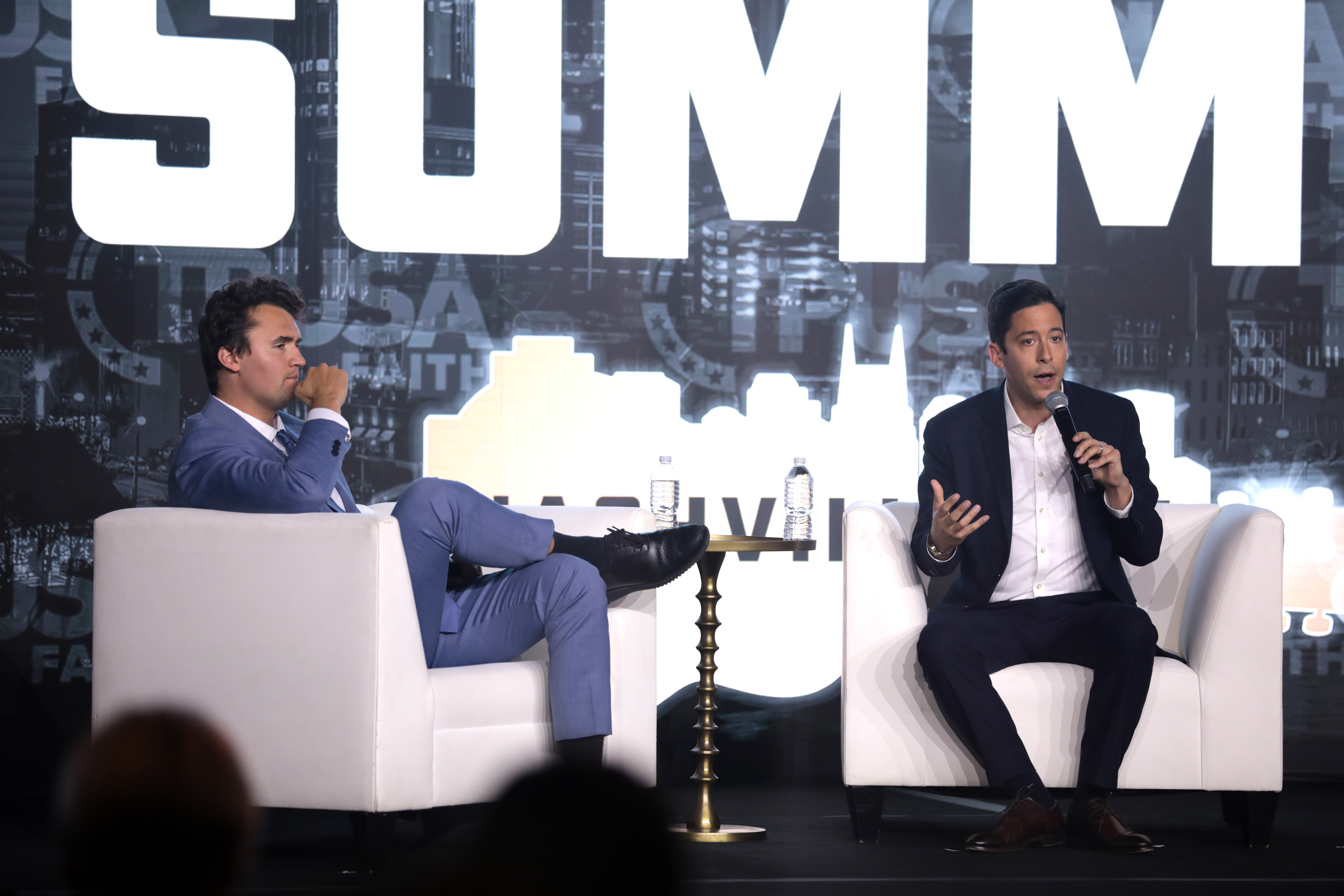
Knowles (right) with Charlie Kirk (left) at a Turning Point USA event in 2023

Knowles joined The Daily Wire in 2016 as a guest and cultural correspondent for The Andrew Klavan Show. Starting in 2017, he began the Michael Knowles Show, a daily political podcast, also under The Daily Wire.

In April 2019, Knowles gave a speech at an event sponsored by the Young America's Foundation at the University of Missouri–Kansas City titled "Men Are Not Women." When students protested the event, one assaulted him and sprayed him with an unknown mixture (later determined to be lavender oil). The student was subdued by police and later charged for several violations. Chancellor C. Mauli Agrawal initially condemned Knowles and praised the protests, before clarifying the university is committed to free speech after backlash. Knowles criticized the response while several Missouri lawmakers threatened to cut the school's budget.

During the first impeachment proceedings of President Donald Trump in January 2020, Knowles and U.S. senator Ted Cruz launched the podcast Verdict with Ted Cruz to discuss the trial. The podcast became the number one podcast on iTunes for a period of time. He co-hosted the podcast until October 2022, leaving when it was acquired by iHeartRadio due to contractual reasons.

In January 2021, radio network Westwood One syndicated the Michael Knowles Show to help target a young conservative demographic. The network decided to not renew the show in 2024. In 2025, The Wall Street Journal described him as one of the most prominent Catholic political commentators in the American conservative movement.

=== Publications ===
In February 2017, Knowles released an empty book called Reasons to Vote for Democrats: A Comprehensive Guide. The book, which contained 266 empty pages, became a bestseller on Amazon. President Donald Trump endorsed the book after Knowles appeared on Fox & Friends, where he highlighted the book and praised Trump's foreign policy.

Knowles published the book Speechless: Controlling Words, Controlling Minds, in 2021. According to Publishers Weekly, it was the number one weekly bestseller for hardcover nonfiction with 17,500 copies sold. It was the number two bestseller for nonfiction on Audible.

Knowles wrote the introduction to the 70th anniversary edition of God and Man at Yale by William F. Buckley Jr.

== Views ==
=== Transgender people ===
Knowles is known for his anti-trans rhetoric. During a speech at the Conservative Political Action Conference in March 2023, Knowles argued that "If [transgenderism] is false, then for the good of society, transgenderism must be eradicated from public life entirely – the whole preposterous ideology." His comments were criticized by multiple people and organizations, such as the Human Rights Campaign, the Anti-Defamation League, and the American Constitution Society. Multiple outlets and organizations said that the comments were "blatantly genocidal" and that they could exacerbate "genocidal fervor". Knowles defended his stance, stating that the outlets were being libelous, and that he was referring to what he called the ideology of "transgenderism", rather than to transgender people.

=== Greta Thunberg ===
In September 2019, while on the Fox News program The Story, Knowles called climate activist Greta Thunberg a "mentally ill Swedish child". The network apologized for Knowles's statement, saying his comment was "disgraceful," and announced that they would not book him as a guest in the future. Knowles refused to apologize and roughly two years later, reappeared as a guest on Fox News during a segment with host Tucker Carlson.

=== Salem witch trials ===
At the June 2026 Great American State Fair, while addressing to a young girl, Knowles stated that he did not know if the people who were "burned" during the Salem witch trials were guilty or not. Knowles said he would have preferred more formalized proceedings rather than "random judges" who were "burning these ladies."

== Personal life ==
Knowles married his wife Alissa in June 2018. They have three sons and a daughter. He was honored with a Doctor of Humane Letters by Ave Maria University in 2025.

== Filmography ==
Year	Title	Role
2012	House of Shades	Gavin
2016	The Hopping Dead	Bubba
2018	Clipped Wings, They Do Fly	Robert
2019	Hollyweird	Alejandro Costello
2023	Lady Ballers	Drake Diamond
2025	The Pope and the Führer: The Secret Vatican Files of World War II	Self
2026	Revolutionary America	Self

== Bibliography ==
- Reasons to Vote for Democrats: A Comprehensive Guide (2017). Threshold Editions. ISBN 978-1-5430-2497-5. OCLC 984757249.
- Speechless: Controlling Words, Controlling Minds (2021). Regnery Publishing. ISBN 978-1-68451-082-5 OCLC 1243742524.
