= Shed Simove =

British entertainer, author, and entrepreneur

Sheridan "Shed" Simove
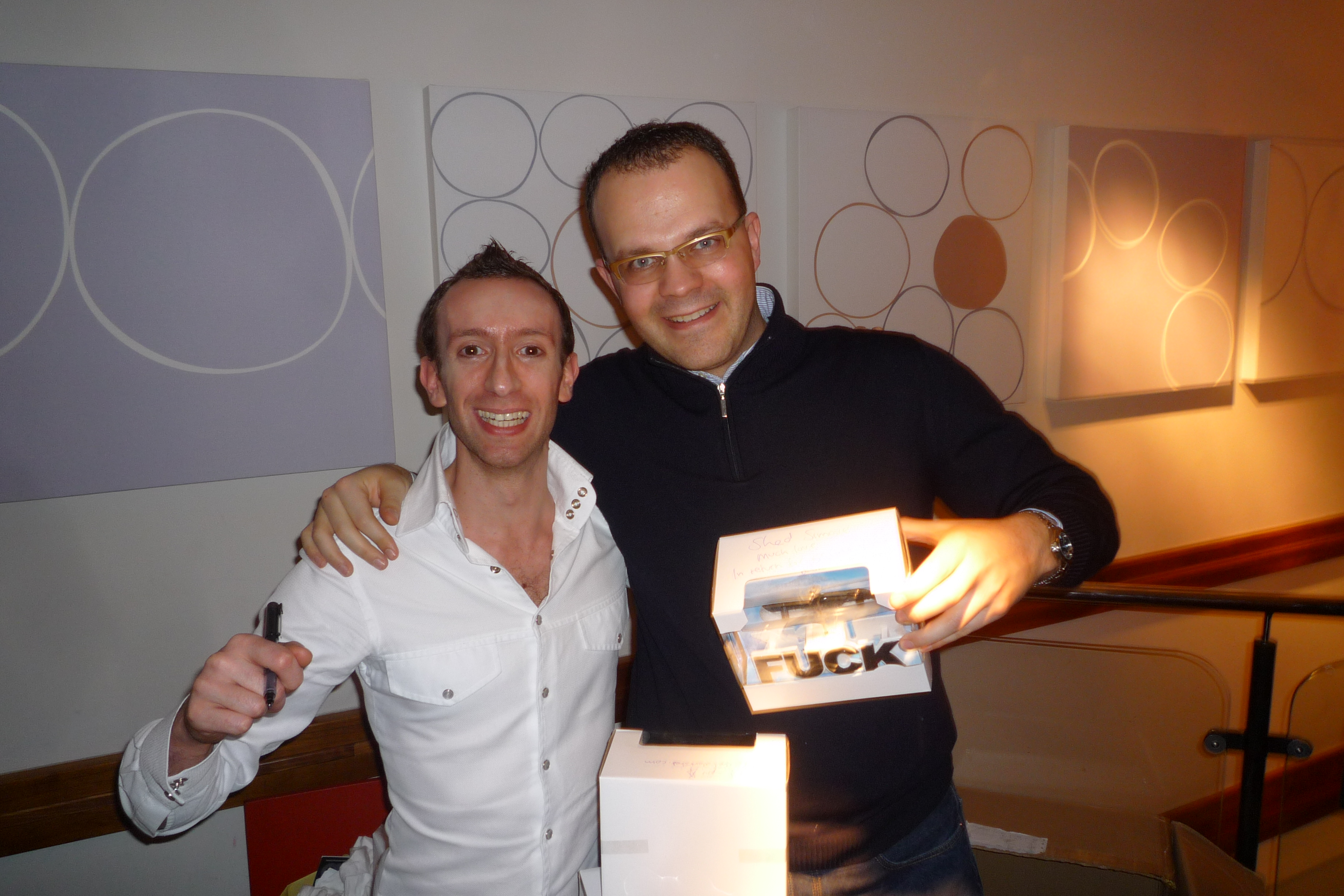
- Shed Simove (left) pictured in 2009 by Simone Brunozzi
- Born: Cardiff, Wales, U.K.
- Education: Oxford University (BA)
- Occupations: Entertainer, author, entrepreneur
- Known for: Novelty products
- Website: shedsimove.com

Sheridan "Shed" Simove is a British entertainer, author, and entrepreneur known for inventions, novelty products, and publicity stunts.

== Early life ==
Simove was born in Cardiff, Wales. He received his pre-university education in Cardiff and attended Balliol College, Oxford University, where he completed a degree in Experimental Psychology. Simove has a brother and a sister.

== Career ==
Simove began his career in television. In 2001, Simove posed as a 16-year-old schoolboy for eight weeks as part of a Channel 4 documentary called Back to School, filmed at Kingdown secondary school in Wiltshire, England. When the head teacher heard about the real reason for the documentary, she escorted the film crew and Simove from the school grounds. Following the documentary team rejection, it was decided to scrap the series and it never aired. Simove was subsequently appointed commissioning editor of Big Brother in the United Kingdom in the mid-2000s.

In 2008, Simove published Ideas Man.

As an entertainer, Simove appeared at Edinburgh Fringe in 2009.

Simove has written and released two novelty blank books. His first was published in 2011. What Every Man Thinks About Apart from Sex contains 200 blank pages. It was promoted by Student Unions across the United Kingdom as a notebook. It became an Amazon bestseller, reaching #44 on Amazon sales charts. In 2012, Simove released 50 Shades of Gray. This book also notably contained no content and was full of blank pages in different shades of grey. Random House, publisher of Fifty Shades of Grey, threatened legal action.

In 2008, he created a currency called The Ego. In 2010, he released the iNotePad, a notebook designed to imitate the Apple iPad. In 2013, he launched a Kickstarter to release the Belt Mistletoe, a clip-on attachment to display a mistletoe on a belt. The Kickstarter reached its funding goals.

In 2013, Simove released the Rampant Rabbi, a sex toy in the shape of a Rabbi. Its application for a trademark was appealed by lingerie store chain Ann Summers, who have a similarly named product called a Rampant Rabbit.

In 2017, Simove published Shinder, a dating app where he was the only man available on the platform. Tinder subsequently filed copyright infringement against the platform created by Simove. Simove claimed to have received 150 matches and gone on 3 dates. Shinder went on to win best Low Budget Campaign at the PRCA awards in 2017.

In 2018, Simove was warned by police officers against selling inflatable imitation speed cameras, with the possibility that they would contravene the Road Traffic Act 1988 and Simove could be held responsible if they caused a crash.

In 2021, Simove set up rejectioncollection.net, a website listing every rejection letter he had received from publishing houses for his book Alpha Male, with the stated goal to be rejected by every publisher in the United Kingdom.

Simove works as a motivational speaker. In 2019, Simove was a speaker at TED in Vitosha, Bulgaria, on How to be number one in a field of one?
