= The Unsuccessful Self-Treatment of a Case of "Writer's Block" =

Humorous academic article

"The Unsuccessful Self-Treatment of a Case of 'Writer's Block' " is a humorous academic article by psychologist Dennis Upper about writer's block. It has no content except the title, journal formatting elements, and a humorous footnote.

Published in 1974 in a peer reviewed journal, Journal of Applied Behavior Analysis, it is recognized as the shortest academic article ever and a classic example of humor in science, or at the very least among behavioral psychologists. It has been cited more than 100 times.

The article received a humorous positive review which was published alongside the article.

I have studied this manuscript very carefully with lemon juice and X-rays and have not detected a single flaw in either design or writing style. I suggest it be published without revision. Clearly, it is the most concise manuscript I have ever seen – yet it contains sufficient detail to allow other investigators to replicate Dr. Upper's failure. In comparison with the other manuscripts I get from you containing all that complicated detail, this one was a pleasure to examine. Surely we can find a place for this paper in the Journal – perhaps on the edge of a blank page.

The article has led to at least five similarly humorous and peer-reviewed, published replication studies, and several similar papers and scholarly articles.

More seriously, the paper is said to be a case reinforcing the image of a writer's block as a "blank page", and encouraging brevity in writing. It has been also used as an example that humor can indeed be found in academic publishing.
