= Reasons to Vote for Democrats =

Satirical blank book

Reasons to Vote for Democrats: A Comprehensive Guide
- Author: Michael J. Knowles
- Genre: Political satire
- Publisher: CreateSpace Independent Publishing Platform
- Publication date: February 8, 2017
- Publication place: United States
- Pages: 266
- ISBN: 978-1-5430-2497-5

Reasons to Vote for Democrats: A Comprehensive Guide is a self-published satirical book by Michael J. Knowles. It comprises 266 pages, with the majority of it being blank. It was a best-selling book on Amazon.com in March of 2017.

== Summary and background ==
The book was divided into 10 "chapters": Economics, Foreign Policy, Civil Rights, Education, Homeland Security, Energy, Jobs, Crime, Immigration, and Values and Principles—all of which are blank. The book contains a quote from Thucydides. The end of the book is a bibliography of where Knowles obtained the supposed "information" from. Knowles, in the book, called it the "most exhaustively researched and coherently argued Democrat Party apologia to date."

Concerning the lack of content, Knowles said via Fox News that he has been "observing the Democratic Party for at least 10 years now, and when I observed their record and reasons to vote for them—on reasons of economics or foreign policy or homeland security or civil rights and so on—I realized it was probably best to just leave all the pages blank." Knowles said in the book that to be able to be qualified for distribution, "Lefty lawyers require that we state the book is mostly blank and contains precisely 1,235 words."

== Reception ==
Reasons to Vote for Democrats ranked number 85 in Amazon as of April 2017 as quoted by the Los Angeles Times, and was briefly at the top of Amazon's bestseller list in March of that year.

Conservative commentators, including art critic Roger Kimball in The Weekly Standard, reviewed the book favorably, stating that "Knowles has matched matter and message with rare economy" and that "it is for the substance of his analysis that Knowles's study will be remembered."

In The Guardian, Danuta Kean called it "a product worthy of Reggie Perrin's Grot shop – the store opened to sell tat in David Nobbs's magnificent satire of modern life", going on to say that "the real joke is that readers are prepared to pay for what is essentially a sketchpad with a funny jacket."

On April 17, 2017, U.S. President Donald Trump mentioned the book on Twitter, calling it "a great book for your reading enjoyment". Knowles responded by stating: "I'm honored that President Trump enjoyed this important work of scholarship." Business Insider reported that "critics complained that the president was violating ethics rules by endorsing" the book.
