= Amy Jadesimi =

Nigerian businesswoman

- Born: 1976 (age 49–50); Nigeria
- Education: University of Oxford (Bachelor of Arts in Physiology) (Bachelor of Medicine and Bachelor of Surgery); Stanford University (Master of Business Administration)
- Occupations: Physician, entrepreneur, business executive
- Years active: 2004–present
- Title: Chief executive officer of Lagos Deep Offshore Logistics Base
- Parent(s): Oladipo Jadesimi; Alero Okotie-Eboh
- Relatives: Emma Thynn, Marchioness of Bath (paternal half-sister); Festus Okotie-Eboh (maternal grandfather)

Amy Jadesimi (born 1976) is a Nigerian businesswoman and the chief executive officer of the Lagos Deep Offshore Logistics Base (LADOL), a privately owned logistics and engineering facility in the Port of Lagos, Nigeria.

== Background and education ==
Amy Jadesimi was born in Nigeria in 1976. Her father is Chief Oladipo Jadesimi, the executive chairman of LADOL. Her mother, Alero Okotie-Eboh, was a former broadcaster who became a full-time homemaker. Her maternal grandfather, Chief Festus Okotie-Eboh, was a politician who became the Nigerian Minister of Finance.

Jadesimi was educated at Benenden School in the United Kingdom, then at the University of Oxford, where she studied from 1993 to 1999 and graduated BA in Physiological Sciences and BMBCh in medicine. Later, she gained an MBA from the Stanford Graduate School of Business.

Jadesimi is a half-sister of Emma McQuiston, a fashion model who is now Marchioness of Bath.

== Career ==
After medical school, Jadesimi was recruited by Goldman Sachs. She started work in the investment banking division of the firm, based in its London offices, focusing on mergers and acquisitions and corporate finance. She worked there for three years. Although Jadesimi trained as a physician, she pursued a career in business after joining Goldman Sachs and later completing an MBA at Stanford.

After graduating from Stanford University, she interned for one year at Brait SE in Johannesburg, South Africa, where she worked in the private equity division as a transaction executive. In 2004, she relocated back to her homeland and joined LADOL, the logistics firm that her father started in 2001. Over time, she rose through the ranks and in 2009, she was appointed by the board as the chief executive officer of the business. Through LADOL, Jadesimi became involved with the Venture Strategies for Health and Development (VSHD) organization, where she worked with other Nigerian doctors and birth attendants to reduce maternal mortality in Nigeria. The practitioners found that drugs used to prevent maternal deaths were expensive and therefore unaffordable for many pregnant women. VSHD subsequently developed a lower-cost drug and partnered with Emzor Pharmaceuticals to distribute it in Nigeria. Under Jadesimi's supervision, the organization partnered with a leading pharmaceutical company in Nigeria, Emzor Pharmaceuticals, to distribute the drugs through Nigeria. Beyond LADOL, she serves on the Prince's Trust International global advisory board, was a founding commissioner of the Business and Sustainable Development Commission, and is a Forbes contributor.

Jadesimi was a guest panelist at the London Business School African Summit, where she spoke about integration and growth on the continent. During the summit, she also participated in an art collaboration titled Remember To Rise.

== Honors and awards ==
In 2012, Jadesimi was named an Archbishop Desmond Tutu Fellow. In 2013, she was named as a Young Global Leader by the World Economic Forum. That year, she was also named a Rising Talent by the Women's Forum for the Economy and Society. Forbes included her in the "2014 20 Youngest Power Women in Africa" article. The Financial Times named her one of the "Top 25 Africans To Watch". Jadesimi was recognized as one of the Global Top 100 "Most Influential People of African Descent" in support of the United Nations "International Decade for People of African Descent".

== See also ==
- Economy of Nigeria
