= Rusty Mike Radio =

Internet radio station in Israel

RustyMike Radio is an Internet radio station established in 2009. The station, which is based in Jerusalem, broadcasts 24 hours, 6 days a week. The station was founded by Adam Mallerman, and is sponsored by the Association of Americans and Canadians in Israel, as well as advertisers. The station plays music and conducts interviews, topics of which have pertained to social action, legal advice, psychotherapy, job advice, cooking and comedy. The station policy is to steer clear of political positions.

== Etymology ==
Founder Adam Mallerman tried various suggestions in a search engine using the word "microphone" and related forms and Rusty Mike resulted. A friend with marketing experience was contacted and upon hearing, his reaction was, 'Bloody stupid, I think you're nuts.' The friend tested some products in a phone survey and added RustyMike Radio. He called Mallerman the next day and informed that people liked the RustyMike name best.

Rusty Mike does not actually exist, other than the fictional studio engineer that Mallerman blames technical glitches on. Per Mallerman, "it encapsulates the concepts that aren't known to go together, but fit perfectly - a microphone that's rusty and a radio station that's only on the Internet".

== Influences ==
BBC local radio and Israeli Hebrew-language stations Galgalatz and Reshet Bet are cited as influences for RustyMike Radio. Other influences include previous English-language radio stations in Israel such as the Voice of Peace launched by Abie Nathan on a ship in 1973, Jerusalem-based Radio West in the 1990s and the more recent Ramallah-Jerusalem coexistence station RAM FM. An additional influence is the station's sister station, Radio Kol Rega, whose Program Director, Richard Freedman, is the afternoon drive time DJ for RustyMike Radio.

== Purpose ==
The station serves English-speaking Israelis who do not speak Hebrew well enough to follow the regular Israeli print and radio media. The Station is aimed at the adult contemporary audience of the two hundred and fifty thousand Anglos in Israel.

== Programming ==
RustyMike Radio's music content includes current hits, classic rock and soul, contemporary and classic Jewish and Israeli music, country music, hard rock and some classical tunes. In addition, it provides various interviews related to the Israel and Jewish scene. The station maintains an audio library of hundreds of podcasts of the interviews described above which are available without charge to the user.

== On-air personalities ==
As of September 2010, the radio staff included the following:

- Adam Mallerman, morning drive time and J-Jam (Jewish music) host
- Richard Freedman, afternoon drive time host who broadcasts from the Israeli Kol Rega station in Afula
- Mimi Borowich, host of Mimi’s mid-week music
- Ilona Diamond, host of “Country Love”, a weekly country music show
- Nettie Feldman, host of Afternoon Shmooze, a talk and oldies music show
- Douglas Goldstein, CFP, host of “Goldstein on Gelt” a Monday evening show that discussing financial planning in Israel
- Andrea Simantov, host of “Gimme a Break”, weekly show focusing on Israeli life
- Joop Soessan, host of “Car Talk"
- Michael “Maximum Mike” Somogyi, host of Rock 4 Rookies
- Ami Steinberger, host of a weekly Israeli music show & CEO of www.ulpan.com
- Jerry “Mr. T” Stevenson, host of the weekly “Music 4 the Middle Mind”
- Sharon Wagner, formerly of Radio West
