= Ajoritsedere Awosika =

Nigerian businesswoman

Ajoritsedere Josephine Awosika
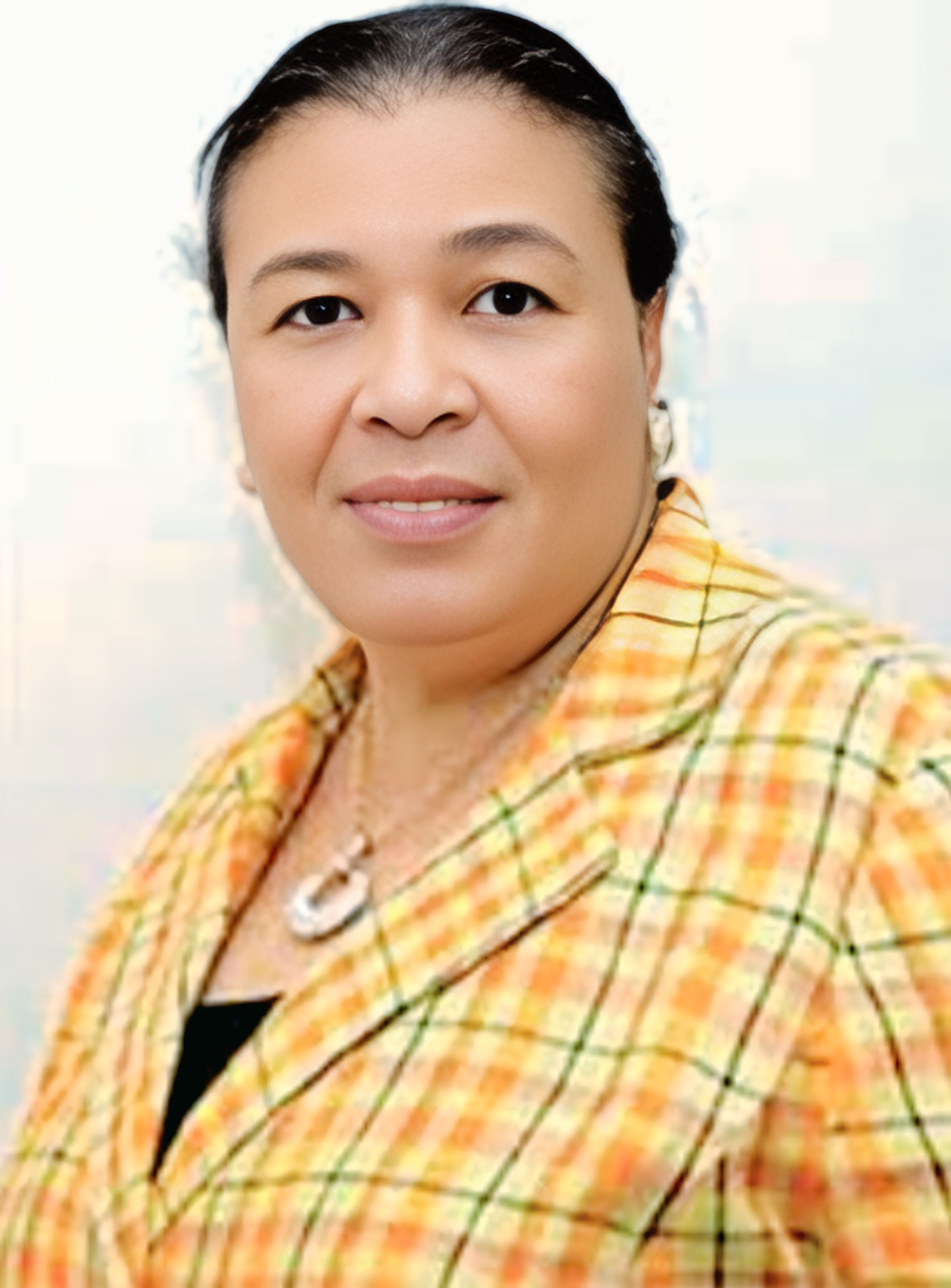
- Ajoritsedere (Dere) Josephine Awosika
- Born: January 15, 1953 (age 73); Sapele, Nigeria
- Citizenship: Nigerian
- Education: University of Bradford (Ph.D. Pharmaceutical Technology)
- Occupation: Businesswoman
- Organizations: Pharmaceutical Society of Nigeria; West African Postgraduate College of Pharmacy
- Known for: Chairperson of Access Bank plc
- Parent: Festus Okotie‑Eboh (father)

Ajoritsedere (Dere) Josephine Awosika (January 15 1953) is a Nigerian businesswoman who is chairperson of Access Bank plc. Prior to this appointment, she was Permanent Secretary in the Federal Ministries of Internal Affairs, Science & Technology and Power at different periods.

== Early life and family background ==
Awosika was born in Sapele, the sixth child of the first Nigerian Minister for Finance in the first republic, Festus Okotie-Eboh, who was assassinated in 1966. She is a fellow of the Pharmaceutical Society of Nigeria and the West African Postgraduate College of Pharmacy. She is an alumna of the University of Bradford, where she holds a Doctorate in Pharmaceutical Technology.
