= Anna Thynn, Marchioness of Bath =

Hungarian actress (1943–2022)

The Most Honourable The Marchioness of Bath
- Lady Bath in Zeta One (1970)

Personal details
- Born: Anna Abigail Gyarmathy; 27 September 1943 Budapest, Kingdom of Hungary
- Died: 17 September 2022 (aged 78) Paris, France
- Spouses: Gilbert Pineau (divorced); Alexander Thynn, 7th Marquess of Bath (m. 1969; died 2020)
- Children: Lady Lenka Thynn; Ceawlin Thynn, 8th Marquess of Bath
- Parent: László Izsak Gyarmathy (father)
- Occupation: Actress; war correspondent

Anna Abigail Thynn, Marchioness of Bath (née Gyarmathy; 27 September 1943 – 17 September 2022), styled as Viscountess Weymouth between 1969 and 1992, also known by her stage name Anna Gaël, was a Hungarian-French actress and war correspondent.

== Early life ==
Anna Abigail Gyarmathy was born on 27 September 1943 in Budapest, Hungary. Her father, László Izsak Gyarmathy, was a mathematician and her mother was a poet. She moved to France as a child and began acting when she was fifteen.

== Career ==
Anna Gyarmathy acted under the stage name 'Anna Gaël'. She starred in Hungarian, German, Italian, American and French films including Via Macau in 1966, Therese and Isabelle in 1968, Zeta One, aka The Love Factor in 1969, The Bridge at Remagen in 1969 and Take Me, Love Me in 1970. She retired from acting in 1981. She worked as a news reporter, covering conflicts in Vietnam, South Africa and the Northern Ireland conflict.

== Personal life and death ==
She met Alexander Thynn, Viscount Weymouth, the son of Henry Thynne, 6th Marquess of Bath, and Daphne Fielding, in Paris in 1959. She later became the Viscount's mistress while she was married to French film director Gilbert Pineau; in 1969, she and the Viscount married. Later that year she gave birth to their first child, Lady Lenka Thynn. In 1974, she gave birth to their second child, Ceawlin Thynn. In 1992, her husband succeeded his father as the 7th Marquess of Bath; he died in April 2020.

In 2013 her son married Emma McQuiston, the daughter of Nigerian businessman Oladipo Jadesimi. She reportedly disapproved of her son's marriage due to her daughter-in-law's African ancestry and thus did not attend the wedding.

Lady Bath died in Paris on 17 September 2022, aged 78.

== Filmography ==
- 1962: Una storia milanese
- 1966: Via Macau
- 1967: Hell Is Empty
- 1967: Hotel Clausewitz
- 1967: To Commit a Murder
- 1968: Benjamin ou Les Mémoires d'un puceau
- 1968: Murder at the Grand Hotel (Le Démoniaque)
- 1968: Therese and Isabelle
- 1968: Béru et ces dames
- 1969: The House of the Missing Girls (Traquenards)
- 1969: Zeta One
- 1969: The Bridge at Remagen
- 1969: Delitto al circolo del tennis
- 1970: Take Me, Love Me
- 1970: Nana
- 1971: The Persuaders! (episode: "The Old, the New and the Deadly")
- 1973: Blue Blood
- 1974: Le Plumard en folie
- 1976: Dracula père et fils
- 1976: The Porter from Maxim's
- 1978: Sweeney 2
- 1978: L'Hôtel de la plage
