= LADOL =

Privately owned logistics and engineering facility

LADOL - West Africa's Free Zone and Logistics Hub in Nigeria
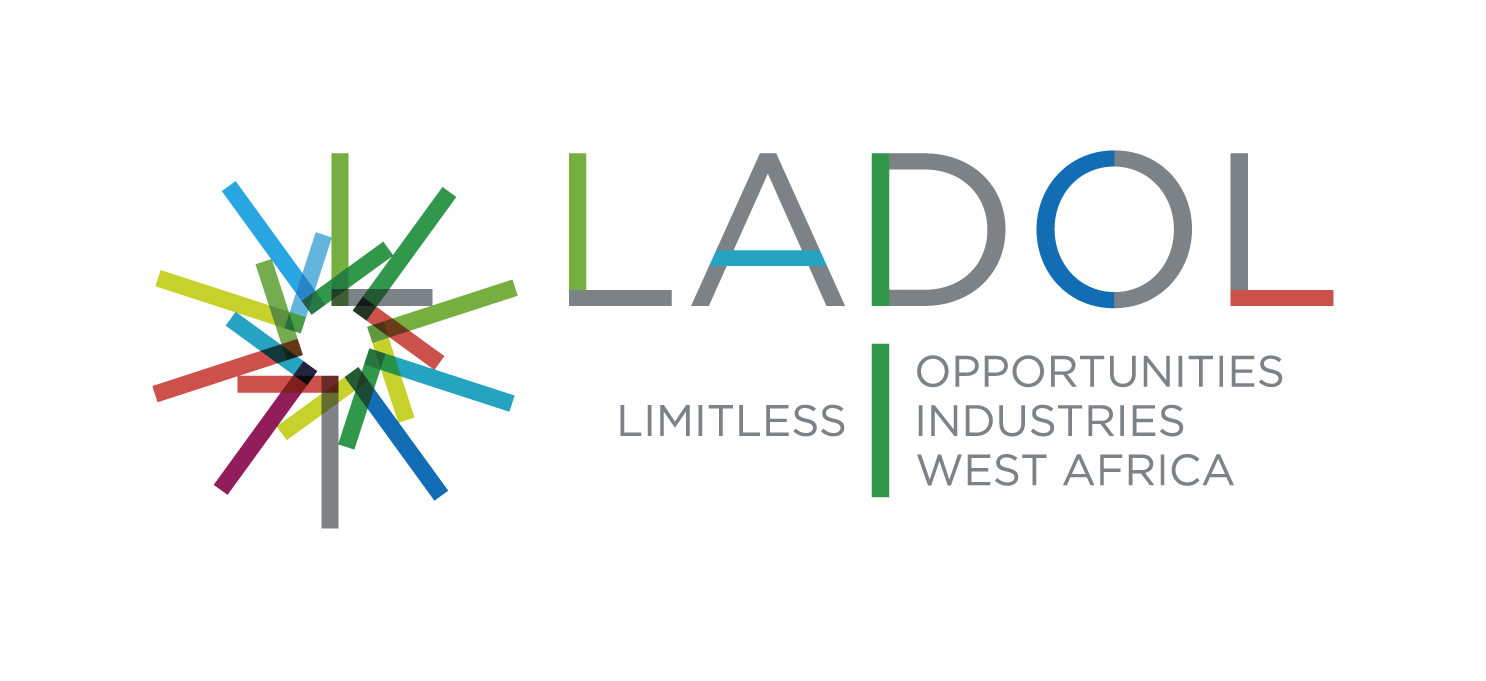
- Industry: Special Economic Zone; Logistics & Supply Chain
- Founded: 2000
- Headquarters: Apapa Port, Tarkwa Bay, Lagos, Lagos State, Nigeria
- Area served: West Africa; Worldwide
- Key people: Oladipo Jadesimi (Executive Chairman), Amy Jadesimi (Managing Director)
- Services: Logistics; Offshore Construction; Utilities; Ports & Cargo Handling; Catering & Hospitality; Free Zone
- Website: http://www.ladol.com/

Lagos Deep Offshore Logistics Base (LADOL), officially LADOL Free Zone, also known as LADOL Base or the initials LFZ, is an industrial Free Zone privately owned logistics and engineering facility located on an island in the Port of Apapa, Lagos, Nigeria.

LADOL was designed to provide logistics, engineering and other support services to offshore oil & gas exploration and production companies operating in and around West Africa.

== History ==
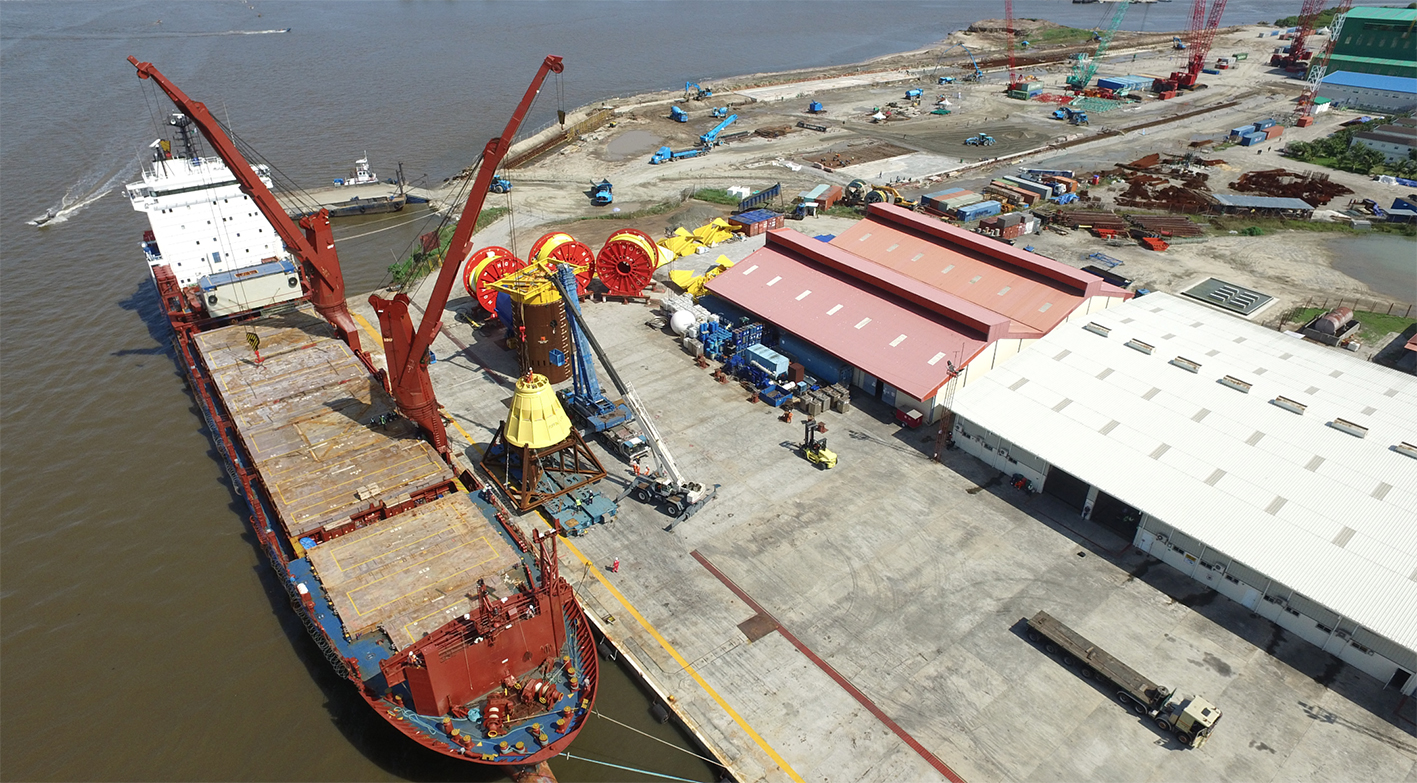

LADOL's developer, LiLe, began the construction of the logistics and engineering base in 2001 and commenced full operations in 2006. In June 2006, LADOL was designated as a Free Zone pursuant to the Nigeria Export Processing Zones Act No. 63 1992. Completed at a cost of US$150 million, LADOL's initial infrastructures included: a 200m quay, 8.5m draft, 25-ton/m2 high load bearing area and additional 30-ton bollards at either end that can accommodate up to six supply vessels and three heavy-lift vessels; a hotel; warehouse; office complex; road; water treatment; and underground reticulation.

In 2015, with the support of Total Upstream Nigeria Limited, LADOL was further expanded to include a new US$300 million Floating Production Storage and Offloading (FPSO) vessel fabrication and integration facility. The FPSO vessel fabrication and integration facility – currently being operated by SHI-MCI FZE, a Nigerian Local Content initiative-driven incorporated joint venture between Samsung Heavy Industries and LADOL's shipyard operator, Mega-Construction and Integration FZE – was initiated to fabricate and integrate Total Egina FPSO in Nigeria and other similar projects expected to be carried out in Africa.

The next phase of LADOL's expansion has been reported to include a dry dock that will be the largest in West Africa and attract as many as 100,000 direct and indirect jobs.
