= Oladipo Jadesimi =

Nigerian businessman

Chief Oladipo "Ladi" Jadesimi is a Nigerian businessman who founded the Lagos Deep Offshore Logistics Base, where he serves as executive chairman.

== Education ==
Oladipo Jadesimi completed his secondary school education at King's College, Lagos. He graduated from Oxford University in 1966 with M.A. and L.L.B. degrees in jurisprudence.

== Career ==
Jadesimi began working as a chartered accountant with Coopers and Lybrand in London. He is a Fellow of the Institute of Chartered Accountants in England and Wales (F.C.A.). He is a founding partner in Arthur Andersen Nigeria, where he serves as an Independent Financial Consultant, and a major investor in the Niger Delta Oil Company. He was appointed a director of Aradel Holdings in 2010 and became chairman of the board on 21 June 2016. He served as a non-executive director of First City Monument Bank from 1983 until 2011. Jadesimi is a founder of Lagos Offshore Logistics Base and serves as the executive chairman.

== Personal life ==
Chief Jadesimi is married to Alero Okotie-Eboh, a broadcaster and daughter of Chief Festus Okotie-Eboh. Their daughter, Amy Jadesimi, is the chief executive officer of LADOL. Jadesimi had an affair with the English socialite Suzanna McQuiston while working as an accountant in London in the 1980s. Through this relationship, he fathered Emma Thynn, Marchioness of Bath.
