= Elizabeth Thynne, Marchioness of Bath =

British courtier (1735-1825)

The Most Honourable The Marchioness of Bath

Personal details
- Born: Lady Elizabeth Bentinck; 27 July 1735 Welbeck Abbey, Nottinghamshire, England
- Died: 12 December 1825 (aged 90) Lower Grosvenor Street, London, England
- Spouse: Thomas Thynne, 1st Marquess of Bath (m. 1759; died 1796)
- Children: Thomas Thynne, 2nd Marquess of Bath; Lady Isabella Thynne; Lady Mary Thynne; Louisa Finch, Countess of Aylesford; Henrietta Stanhope, Countess of Chesterfield; Lady Sophia Thynne; George Thynne, 2nd Baron Carteret; John Thynne, 3rd Baron Carteret
- Parents: William Bentinck, 2nd Duke of Portland (father); Lady Margaret Harley (mother)
- Occupation: Lady of the Bedchamber to Queen Charlotte

Elizabeth Thynne, Marchioness of Bath (née Lady Elizabeth Bentinck; 27 July 1735 – 12 December 1825), was a British courtier and the wife of Thomas Thynne, 1st Marquess of Bath. From 1761 to 1793, she was a Lady of the Bedchamber to Charlotte of Mecklenburg-Strelitz, queen consort of King George III of the United Kingdom. In 1793, as Dowager Marchioness, she became Mistress of the Robes and held that position until the Queen's death in 1818.

== Early life ==
She was born at Welbeck Abbey on 27 July 1735, the daughter of William Bentinck, 2nd Duke of Portland, and his wife, Lady Margaret Harley.

Her paternal grandparents were Henry Bentinck, 1st Duke of Portland and his wife Lady Elizabeth Noel (daughter of the 2nd Earl of Gainsborough). His mother was the only surviving child of the 2nd Earl of Oxford and Mortimer, and the former Lady Henrietta Holles (the only child and heir of the 1st Duke of Newcastle-upon-Tyne).

== Personal life ==
She married Thomas Thynne, then the 3rd Viscount Weymouth, on 22 March 1759 at St. Margaret's Church, Westminster, becoming Viscountess Weymouth. Their eight children were:

- Lady Louisa Thynne (1760 – 1832), who married Heneage Finch, 4th Earl of Aylesford, and had children
- Lady Henrietta Thynne (1762 – 1813), who married Philip Stanhope, 5th Earl of Chesterfield, and had children
- Lady Sophia Thynne (1763–1791), who married George Ashburnham, 3rd Earl of Ashburnham, and had children
- Thomas Thynne, 2nd Marquess of Bath (1765 – 1837), who married the Hon. Isabella Byng and had children.
- George Thynne, 2nd Baron Carteret of Hawnes (1770 –1838), who married the Hon. Harriet Courtenay and had no children
- John Thynne, 3rd Baron Carteret of Hawnes (1772 –1849), who married Mary Anne Master and had no children
- Lady Mary Thynne (1778 – 1814), who married Osborne Markham.
- Lady Isabella Thynne (1780 – 1810)

After her husband became Marquess of Bath in 1789, the viscountess became a marchioness. She died, aged 90, at Lower Grosvenor Street in London.

=== Court role ===
From 1793 to 1818, she served as Mistress of the Robes to the Queen, succeeding Mary Bertie, Duchess of Ancaster and Kesteven. She was herself succeeded by Catherine Osborne, Duchess of Leeds.

Court offices
Preceded by Mary Bertie, Duchess of Ancaster and Kesteven	Mistress of the Robes to Queen Charlotte; 1793–1818	Succeeded by Catherine Osborne, Duchess of Leeds
