= Heneage Finch, 4th Earl of Aylesford =

British artist and politician (1751–1812)

The Right Honourable The Earl of Aylesford PC FRS FSA

Captain of the Yeomen of the Guard
- In office 1783–1804
- Monarch: George III
- Prime Minister: William Pitt the Younger; Henry Addington
- Preceded by: The Earl of Cholmondeley
- Succeeded by: Lord Pelham

Lord Steward of the Household
- In office 1804–1812
- Monarch: George III
- Prime Minister: William Pitt the Younger; The Lord Grenville; The Duke of Portland; Spencer Perceval
- Preceded by: The Earl of Dartmouth
- Succeeded by: The Earl of Cholmondeley

Personal details
- Born: 4 July 1751 Syon House, near London
- Died: 21 October 1812 (aged 61) Great Packington, Warwickshire
- Spouse: Lady Louisa Thynne (m. 1781)
- Children: 13, including Heneage Finch, 5th Earl of Aylesford
- Parent(s): Heneage Finch, 3rd Earl of Aylesford; Lady Charlotte Seymour
- Education: Christ Church, Oxford

Arms of Finch: Argent, a chevron between three griffins passant sable

Heneage Finch, 4th Earl of Aylesford, PC, FRS, FSA (4 July 1751 – 21 October 1812), styled Lord Guernsey between 1757 and 1777, was a British politician who sat in the House of Commons from 1772 to 1777 when he succeeded to a peerage. He was also a landscape artist.

== Background and education ==
Aylesford was the son of Heneage Finch, 3rd Earl of Aylesford, and Lady Charlotte Seymour, daughter of Charles Seymour, 6th Duke of Somerset and Lady Charlotte Finch. He was born at his maternal grandfather, Duke of Somerset's residence, Syon House, near London. (At the time was already inherited by his heiress maternal half-first cousin Elizabeth Percy, Duchess of Northumberland)

He was educated at Christ Church, Oxford.

== Political career ==
Aylesford was returned to parliament for Castle Rising in 1772, a seat he held until 1774, and then represented Maidstone until 1777, when he succeeded his father in the earldom and entered the House of Lords. He was a Lord of the Bedchamber to George III between 1777 and 1783. The latter year he was sworn of the Privy Council and appointed Captain of the Yeomen of the Guard by William Pitt the Younger. He retained this office until 1804, the last three years under the premiership of Henry Addington. When Pitt resumed office in 1804, Aylesford was made Lord Steward of the Household. He continued in this office until his death in 1812, under successively Lord Grenville, the Duke of Portland and Spencer Perceval.

Aylesford also held the honorary position of High Steward of Sutton Coldfield from 1796 until his death.

== Artistic career ==
Apart from his political career Lord Aylesford was an artist of some repute in the British landscape tradition. Tate Britain has 50 watercolours, drawings and prints by Finch in its collection. In 1795 an Album of Etchings by Lord Aylesford and Others was published. A. P. Oppe wrote an article giving some background and listing 85 of Aylesford's etchings titled The Fourth Earl of Aylesford. The Print Collector's Quarterly 1924, Vol 11, p. 263. Lord Aylesford was elected a Fellow of the Royal Society in 1773 and was a trustee of the British Museum between 1787 and 1812.

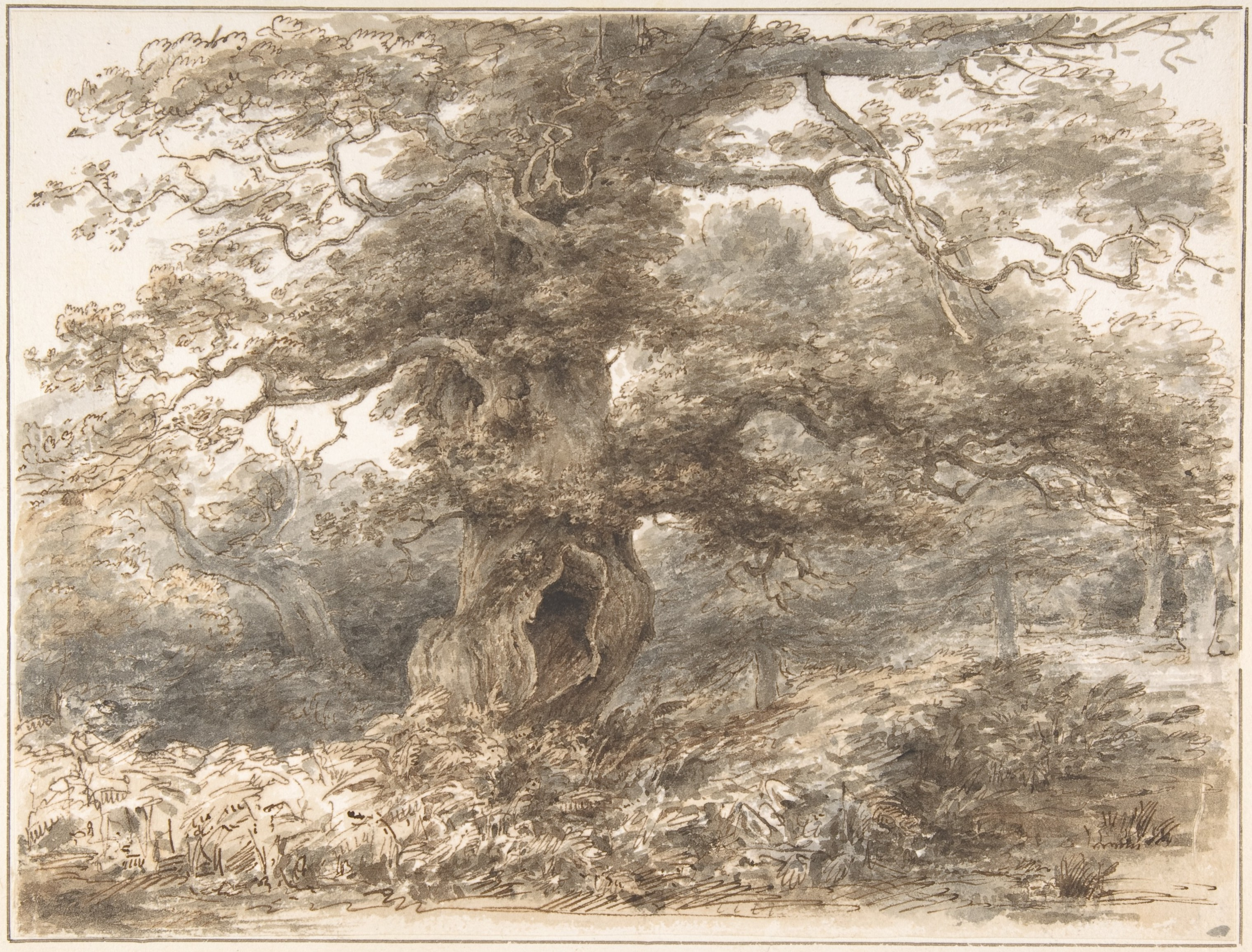
In the Park at Packington

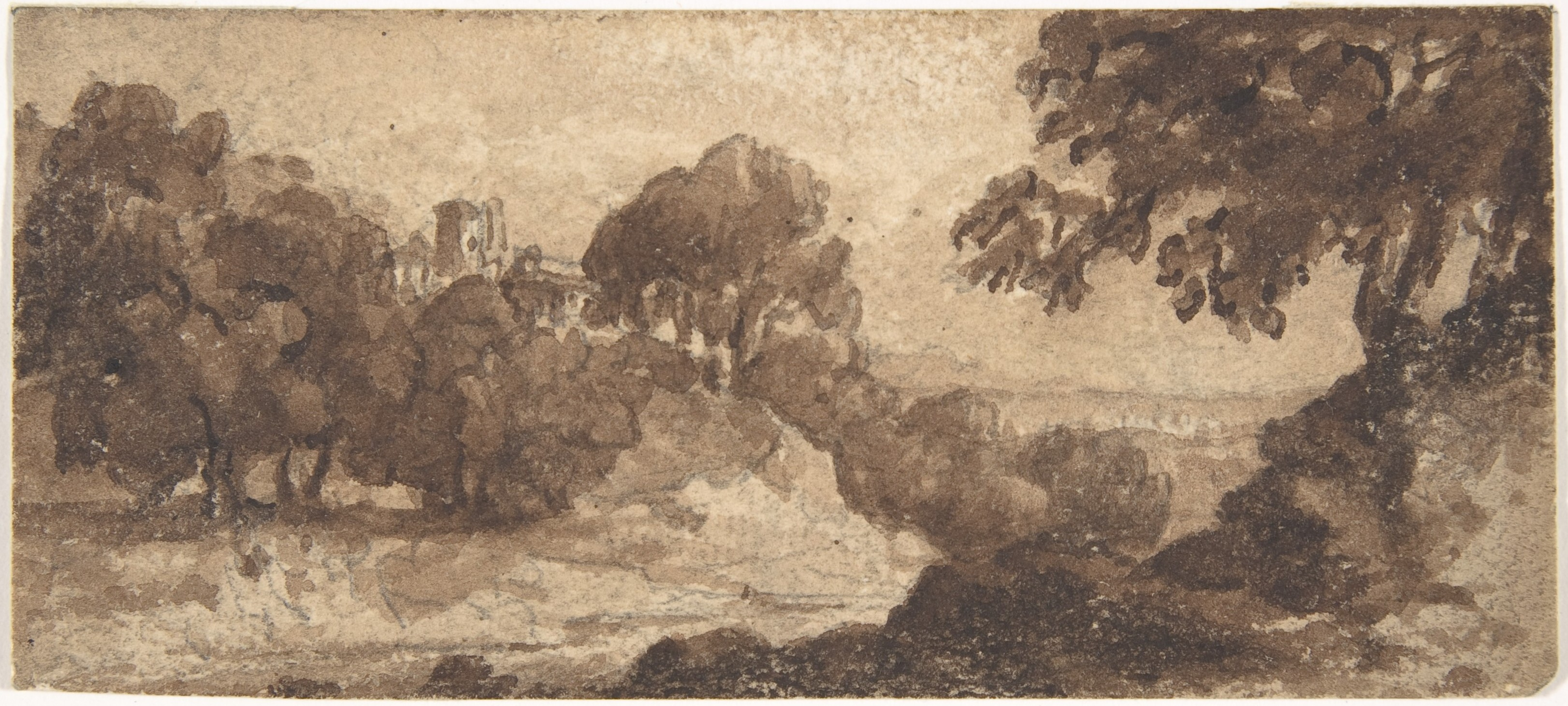
Landscape

== Family ==
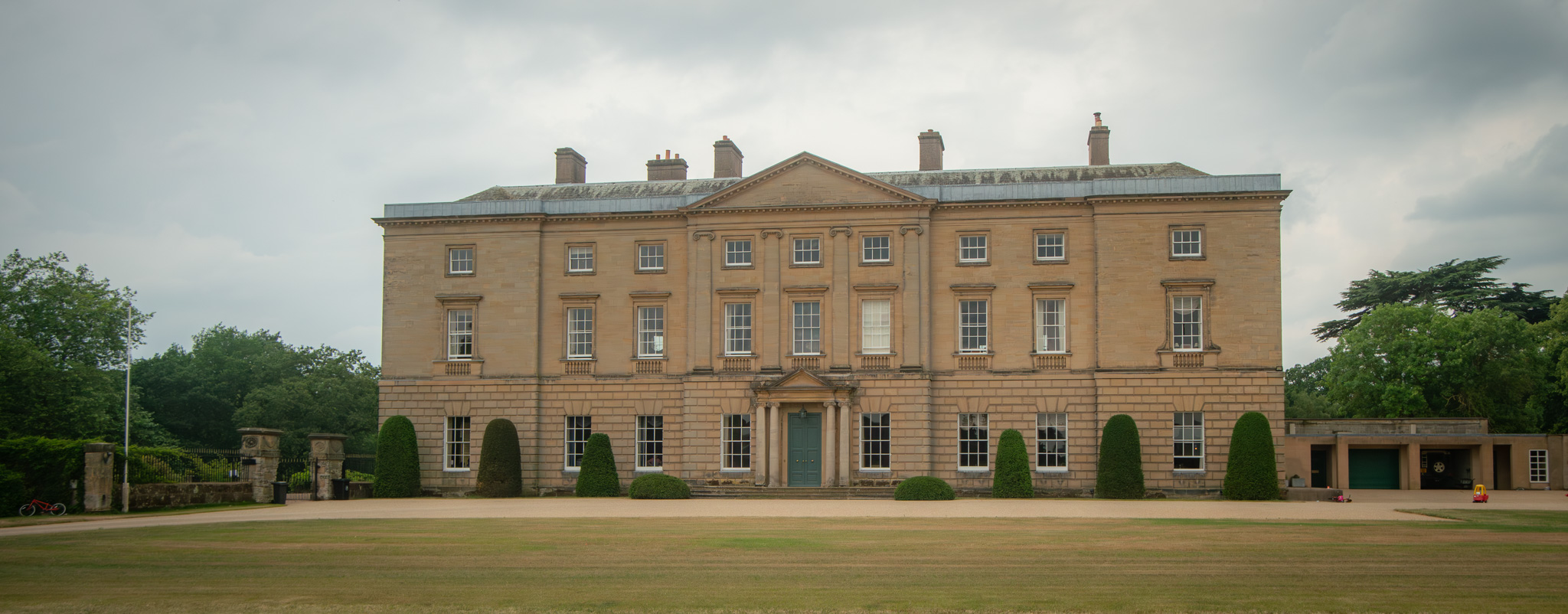
Packington Hall

Lord Aylesford married Lady Louisa Thynne, daughter of Thomas Thynne, 1st Marquess of Bath, on 18 November 1781. They lived at Packington Hall near Meriden, Warwickshire and had thirteen children:

- Heneage Charles Finch, Lord Guernsey (27 February 1784 – 18 July 1784)
- Lady Charlotte Finch (31 January 1785 – 17 January 1869), married Charles Palmer on 22 January 1823.
- Heneage Finch, 5th Earl of Aylesford (24 April 1786 – 1859)
- Lady Mary Finch (c. 1788 - 24 July 1823)
- Hon. Daniel Finch (25 February 1789 – 17 January 1868), artist.
- Lady Elizabeth Finch (22 February 1790 - 1 June 1879)
- Lady Frances Finch (1 February 1791 – 12 July 1886), unmarried
- Hon. Edward Finch (1792 – 9 April 1830)
- Lieutenant-General the Hon. John Finch (1793 – 25 November 1861), married in 1835 Katherine Ellice (d. 1872)
- Hon. Henry Finch (1795–1829)
- Lady Henrietta Finch (c. 1798 - 1828)
- Hon. Charles Finch (b. 1799 - 19 Novembre 1859)
- Lady Caroline Finch (c. 1800 - 1821)

- Hon. Charles and Lady Caroline (buried Jan 27 1797)

Lord Aylesford died at Great Packington, Warwickshire, in October 1812, aged 61, from gout in the stomach. He was succeeded by his eldest surviving son, Heneage. The Countess of Aylesford died in December 1832, aged 72.

== Legacy ==
- namesake of Aylesford, Nova Scotia

Parliament of Great Britain
Preceded by Thomas Whately; Crisp Molineux	Member of Parliament for Castle Rising; 1772–1774; With: Crisp Molineux	Succeeded by Alexander Wedderburn; Robert Mackreth
Preceded by Charles Marsham; Robert Gregory	Member of Parliament for Maidstone; 1774–1777; With: Sir Horace Mann	Succeeded by Sir Horace Mann, Bt; Charles Finch
Political offices
Preceded by The Earl of Cholmondeley	Captain of the Yeomen of the Guard; 1783–1804	Succeeded by Lord Pelham
Preceded by The Earl of Dartmouth	Lord Steward; 1804–1812	Succeeded by The Earl of Cholmondeley
Honorary titles
Preceded by The Marquess of Bath	High Steward of Sutton Coldfield; 1796–1812	Succeeded by The Lord Middleton
Peerage of Great Britain
Preceded by Heneage Finch	Earl of Aylesford; 1777–1812	Succeeded by Heneage Finch
