= Charlotte Seymour =

Charlotte Seymour may refer to:

- Charlotte Spencer, Countess Spencer (1835–1903), née Seymour, British philanthropist
- Charlotte Seymour, Duchess of Somerset (1693–1773),
- Charlotte Seymour (producer), Australian film producer, of upcoming television series Bruny
