= Henrietta Stanhope, Countess of Chesterfield =

English countess (1762–1813)

The Right Honourable The Countess of Chesterfield
- Born: Lady Henrietta Thynne; 17 November 1762
- Died: 31 May 1813 (aged 50); Chesterfield House, Mayfair, London
- Noble family: Thynne
- Spouse: Philip Stanhope, 5th Earl of Chesterfield (m. 1799; died 1813)
- Issue: Lady Georgiana Stanhope; George Stanhope, 6th Earl of Chesterfield
- Father: Thomas Thynne, 1st Marquess of Bath
- Mother: Lady Elizabeth Bentinck
- Occupation: Lady of the Bedchamber to Charlotte of Mecklenburg-Strelitz

Henrietta Stanhope, Countess of Chesterfield (née Lady Henrietta Thynne; 17 November 1762 – 31 May 1813), was the second wife of Philip Stanhope, 5th Earl of Chesterfield.

== Early life ==
Henrietta was the third daughter of Thomas Thynne, 1st Marquess of Bath, and his wife, the former Lady Elizabeth Cavendish-Bentinck. One of her older sisters, Louisa, became Countess of Aylesford, and a younger sister, Sophia, became Countess of Ashburnham. Henrietta's childhood was interrupted by a serious illness, as reported by Mary Granville in a letter of 1770:

I am first going to Lady Weymouth, who is pretty well, but has been a good deal hurried with poor Miss H. Thynne's illness; the poor little creature has undergone much severer discipline than I thank God was necessary in your case – having been twice blooded and once blistered, but the doctors now think her much better.

== Personal life ==
She married the earl on 2 May 1799, in Grosvenor Street, London. From his first marriage to Anne, who died in 1798, he had one daughter, Lady Harriet Stanhope, who died unmarried in 1803. They resided at the family seat, Bretby Hall in Derbyshire, which was rebuilt by the earl in about 1812. The couple had two children:

- Lady Georgiana Stanhope (d. 1824), who married Frederick Richard West, a grandson of John West, 2nd Earl De La Warr.
- George Stanhope, 6th Earl of Chesterfield (1805–1866), who married Hon. Anne Elizabeth Weld-Forester, a daughter of Cecil Weld-Forester, 1st Baron Forester and Lady Katherine Manners (a daughter of the 4th Duke of Rutland).

The countess was a Lady of the Bedchamber to Charlotte of Mecklenburg-Strelitz, queen consort of King George III of the United Kingdom, from 1807 until her own death in 1813.

The countess died at the family's London home, Chesterfield House, Mayfair, aged 50 (though contemporary death notices describe her as 52). Her husband survived her by two years and died aged 59. He was succeeded in the earldom by their son, George.

== Arms ==
Coat of arms of Henrietta Stanhope, Countess of Chesterfield
Escutcheon Philip Stanhope, 5th Earl of Chesterfield (Quarterly Ermine & Gules) impaling Thomas Thynne, 1st Marquess of Bath (Quarterly 1st & 4th barry of ten Or and Sable 2nd & 3rd Argent a lion rampant with tail nowed and erect Gules).
