= John Atcheler =

Victorian slaughterhouse operator in London

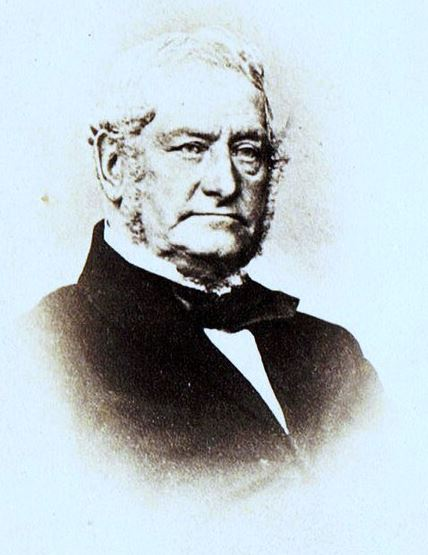
Photograph of John Atcheler

John Atcheler (1792 – 7 March 1867) was the operator of a slaughterhouse in the City of London and claimed to be "Horse Slaughterer to Her Majesty Queen Victoria". Atcheler still made a significant fortune in his line of work, no doubt due in part to his self proclaimed aforementioned title. To this day it is disputed as to whether or not John Atcheler had any form of official title as "Her Majesty's Horse Slaughterer" at all. John Atcheler was married three times and had many children between two of them. Atcheler's grave can be found in London's Highgate Cemetery.

== Early life ==
Atcheler was born in Hockliffe, Bedfordshire, in 1792, the son of another John Atcheler, and in his younger days was a prize fighter. On 2 September 1815, in a 97-minute fight for ten guineas near Walworth, he beat Jack Curtis.

== Career ==
Atcheler first practised his trade at Sharp’s Alley, in Cowcross Street, Smithfield, and his slaughterhouse soon became the largest in London. By 1853 Atcheler’s name became as familiar as a household word, though this was not necessarily positive, for whilst his occupation was accepted as necessary but repellent, knackers in general had a poor reputation. He moved his business to the Kings Cross area, to be close to the new Metropolitan Cattle Market, opened in 1855. His office was at 186 York Road North, Belle-Isle, Islington with his slaughterhouse behind the adjacent Fortune of War public house. When Atcheler died, the yard was taken over by John Harrison who merged his business with that of William Barber, creating Harrison Barber, a company with an effective monopoly on the horse slaughter business in London.

There was considerable value in a dead horse. The hide was turned into leather, the hair from the tail and mane hair was used to pad soft furnishings and fill mattresses, the flesh became food for dogs and cats, the bones were boiled to extract their oil which was used on harnesses and for soap and glue manufacture and then ground up with the hooves for manure or fertiliser, while the horseshoes were recycled by farriers.

Atcheler was a friend of the famous prizefighter Tom Sayers (1826–1865) and was his patron. Sayers was a regular visitor to Atcheler's slaughter yard, helping when required. It is said that whenever they parted company Atcheler would say, "Look after the cat's meat".

Though Atcheler had a large sign outside his premises in York Road proclaiming John Atcheler, Horse Slaughterer to Her Majesty and was extremely public in making this claim, it seems unlikely that he held a Royal Warrant as such. False claims to Royal Warrants were such a problem that in 1883 an international convention made it illegal, but by that time Atcheler was dead. However, in 1867 the Court of Probate accepted the description of "Horse Slaughterer to Her Majesty" in recording its grant of probate on his will.

Henry Mayhew in London Labour and the London Poor stated that "slaughtermen are said to reap large fortunes very rapidly", and Atcheler was no exception. By his death in 1867, he was worth about £35,000, equivalent to £3,388,011 in 2025.

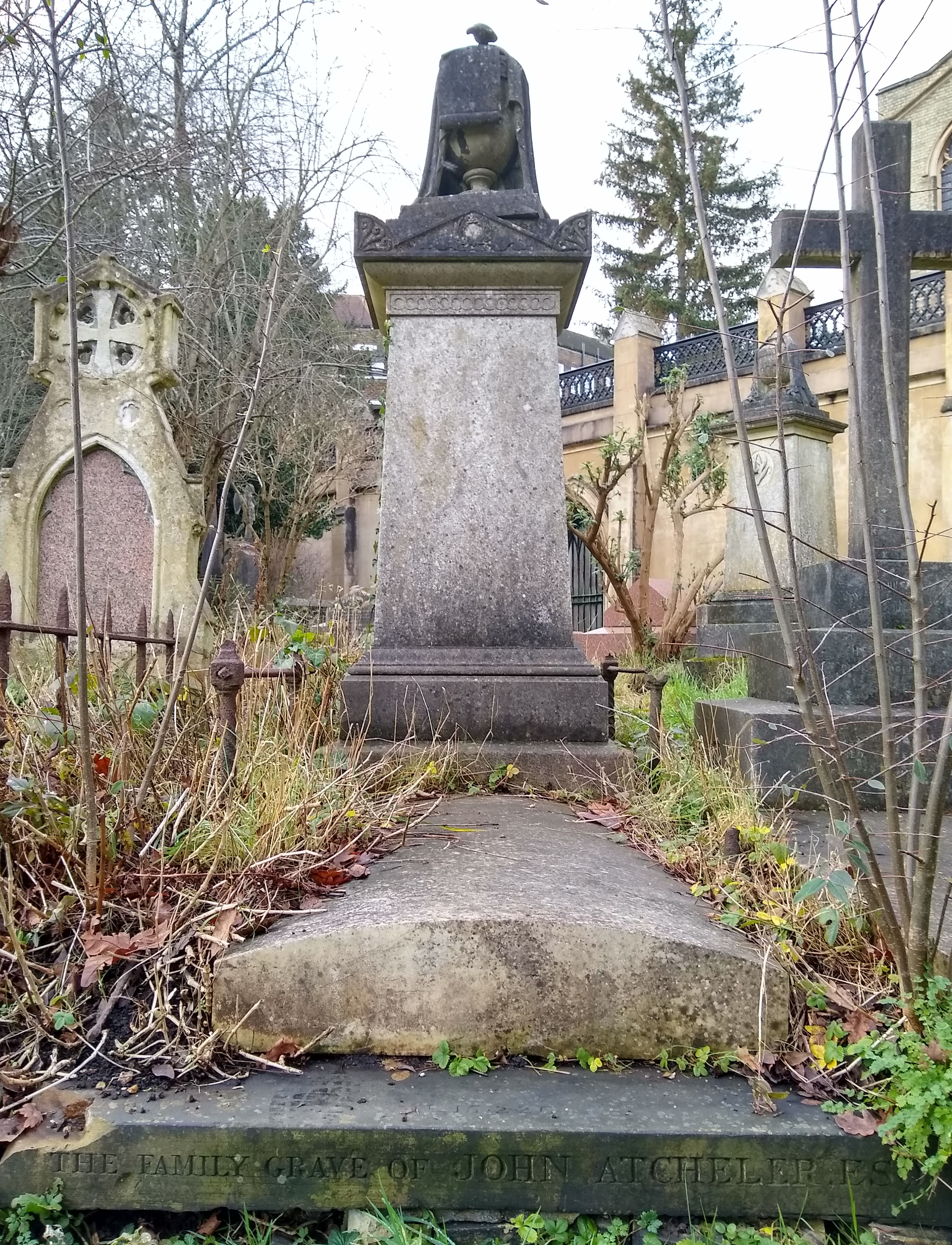
Atcheler's grave in Highgate Cemetery (west side)

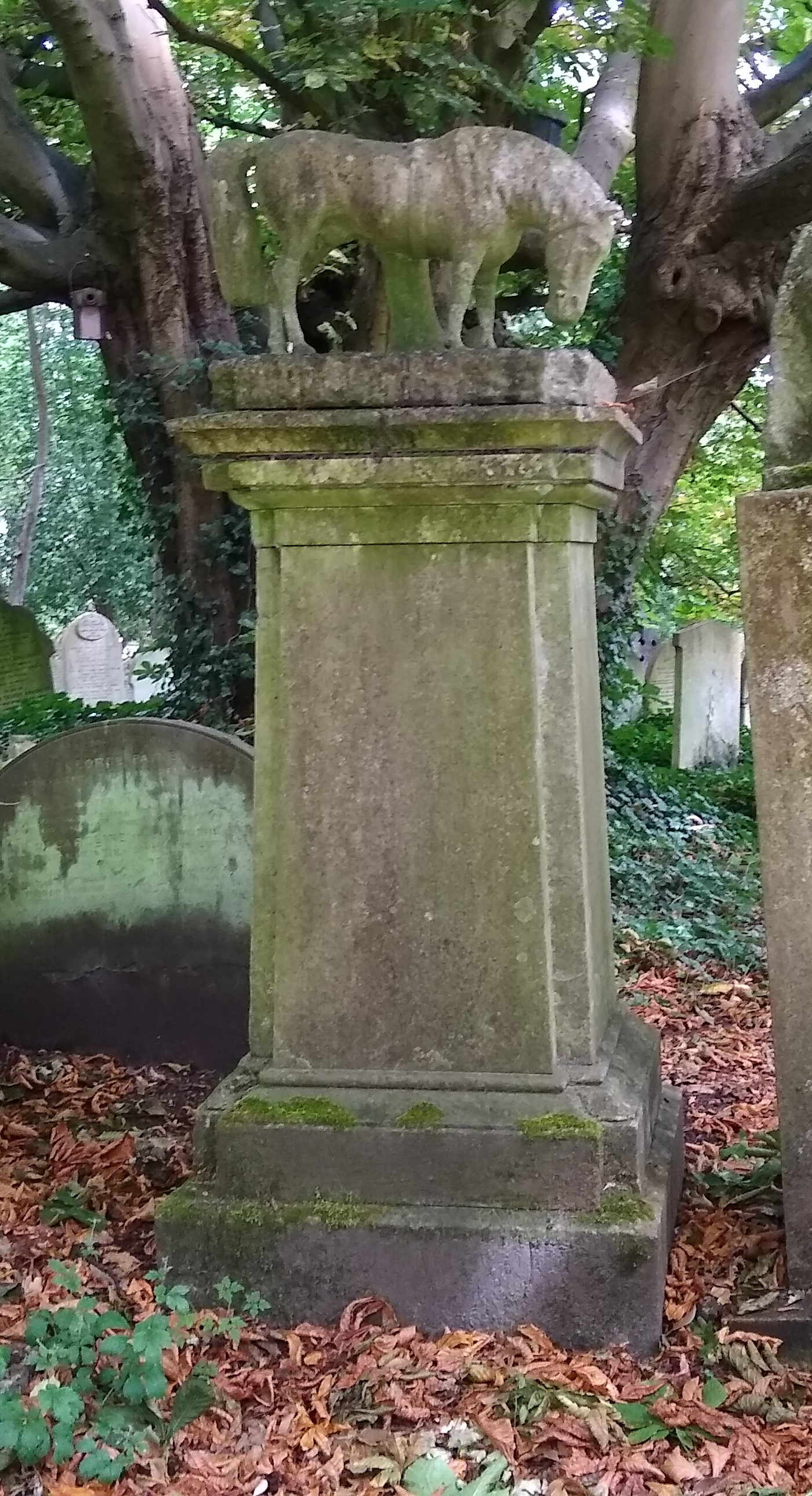
Grave of Atcheler's second wife, son and stepson in Highgate Cemetery (west side)

== Personal life ==
Atcheler was married three times, firstly on 28 October 1811 at the Church of St Mary Magdalene, Bermondsey, while living in that parish. He married Mary Ann Hewson; he signed his name in the register firmly, while she made a mark. His second marriage was on 28 January 1851, at Holy Trinity Church, Islington, to Sarah Mansfield, a widow. In March 1851, they were living in St Sepulchre with his son John, aged 20, hers named Henry Mansfield, 23, and a five-year-old granddaughter, Selina Jones. In 1859, when Atcheler was 68 years old, he married his third wife, Victoria Chancellor. She was the 21-year-old daughter of funeral carriage maker John Chancellor, who supplied horses for hearses; when Atcheler died she became a wealthy widow.

Atcheler spent his final years at Selina Villas, a large house in rural Finchley, where he died on 7 March 1867. He and his second wife are buried at Highgate Cemetery in separate graves. The grave of Sarah Mansfield, who died in 1859, and Atcheler's son and his stepson, lies opposite the grave of Tom Sayers and is marked with a statue of a Suffolk Punch horse with a drooping head on a plinth. The statue is a Grade II Listed historic structure.

In September 1867, at St Pancras, Atcheler’s widow married George Bury, a surgeon and widower, of Friern Barnet; they had several children. In 1881, Mrs Bury was staying with Willington Shelton, gentleman, at Datchet. In 1886, her husband died, aged 77. Within a few weeks she married Captain Willington Augustus David Shelton. Victoria Shelton died in Harley Street on 1 January 1889, aged fifty. At the time of her death she was living at 49, Dover Street, Piccadilly, and her estate was valued for probate at £26,695.
