= Philip Stanhope, 5th Earl of Chesterfield =

British politician and diplomat (1755–1815)

The Right Honourable The Earl of Chesterfield KG, PC, FRS, FSA
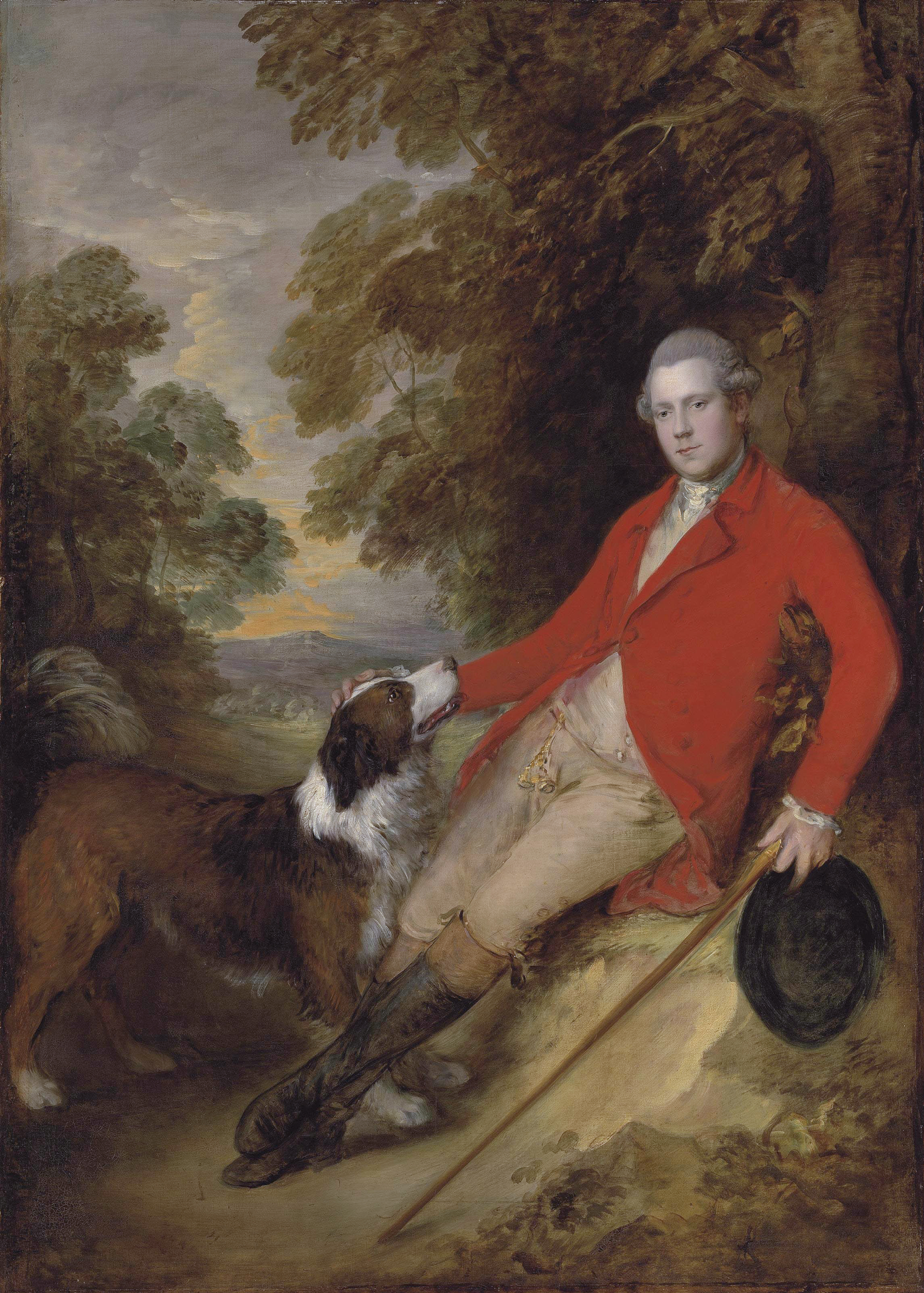
- Portrait by Thomas Gainsborough, 1777

Master of the Mint
- In office 1789–1790
- Monarch: George III
- Prime Minister: William Pitt the Younger
- Preceded by: The Earl of Effingham
- Succeeded by: The Marquess Townshend

Joint Postmaster General
- In office 1790–1798
- Monarch: George III
- Prime Minister: William Pitt the Younger
- Preceded by: The Lord Walsingham and The Earl of Westmorland
- Succeeded by: The Earl of Leicester and The Lord Auckland

Master of the Horse
- In office 1798–1804
- Monarch: George III
- Prime Minister: William Pitt the Younger; Henry Addington
- Preceded by: The Earl of Westmorland
- Succeeded by: The Marquess of Hertford

Personal details
- Born: 10 November 1755 Mansfield Woodhouse, Nottinghamshire, England
- Died: 29 August 1815 (aged 59) Bretby, Derbyshire, England
- Party: Tory
- Spouses: Anne Thistlethwayte (m. 1777; died 1798); Lady Henrietta Thynne (m. 1799; died 1813)
- Children: 3, including the 6th Earl
- Education: University of Leipzig, Saxony

Philip Stanhope, 5th Earl of Chesterfield, KG, PC, FRS, FSA (10 November 1755 – 29 August 1815), known as Philip Stanhope until 1773, was a British politician and diplomat. He served as British Ambassador to Spain (1784–1787), Master of the Mint (1789–1790), Joint Postmaster General (1790–1798) and Master of the Horse (1798–1804).

== Early life and education ==
Stanhope was born at Mansfield Woodhouse, Nottinghamshire, the son of Arthur Charles Stanhope of Mansfield Woodhouse and Margaret, daughter and co-heiress of Charles Headlam of Kerby Hall, Yorkshire. He was a great-great-great-grandson of Philip Stanhope, 1st Earl of Chesterfield. His mother's cousin, Philip Stanhope, 4th Earl of Chesterfield, became his godfather and, having no legitimate children of his own, adopted him as his heir. Upon the 4th Earl's death in 1773, Philip inherited the earldom and its substantial estates.

The 4th Earl, famous for his letters on education, took a keen interest in his godson's upbringing. His tutors included the poet Cuthbert Shaw, the Swiss man of letters Jacques Georges Deyverdun (a friend of Edward Gibbon), Adam Ferguson, Professor of Moral Philosophy at the University of Edinburgh, and the clergyman and forger Dr William Dodd. He later attended the University of Leipzig in Saxony. While in Germany, he was initiated into Freemasonry, becoming a member of the Masonic Lodge Minerva zu den drei Palmen in Leipzig in 1773.

== Political and diplomatic career ==
Lord Chesterfield became a favourite at the court of King George III. He began his official career in 1784 when he was sworn into the Privy Council and appointed Ambassador to Spain, a post he held nominally until 1787, although he never actually resided in Spain.

He subsequently held office under William Pitt the Younger as Master of the Mint (1789–1790) and as Joint Postmaster General (1790–1798). Under Pitt and later Henry Addington, he served as Master of the Horse (1798–1804), a senior position in the Royal Household.

In 1781, he was appointed Lord Lieutenant of Buckinghamshire, succeeding Francis Dashwood, 11th Baron le Despencer, and served until 1782. He had a brief military association with the Buckinghamshire Militia, accepting a temporary commission as lieutenant-colonel in 1794 before resigning shortly thereafter.

Chesterfield was elected a Fellow of the Royal Society (FRS) and of the Society of Antiquaries of London (FSA) in 1776. In 1805, he received the high honour of being appointed a Knight of the Garter.

== Family ==
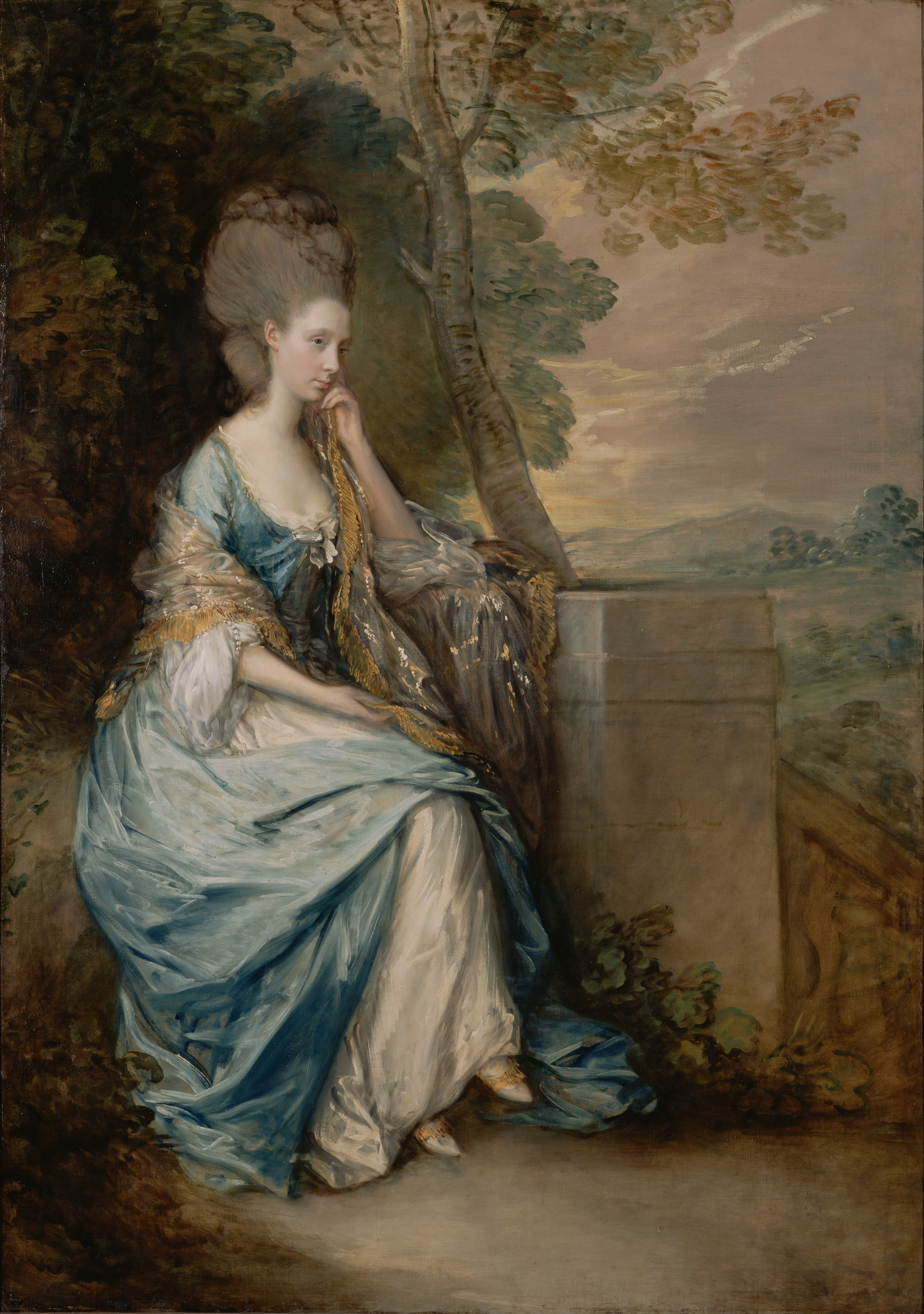
Portrait of his first wife, Anne, by Thomas Gainsborough

Lord Chesterfield married firstly Anne Thistlethwayte, daughter of Reverend Robert Thistlethwayte, on 20 August 1777. They had one daughter:

- Lady Harriet Stanhope (died 1803), who died unmarried.

After Anne's death in October 1798, he married secondly Lady Henrietta Thynne, daughter of Thomas Thynne, 1st Marquess of Bath, on 2 May 1799. They had two children:

- Lady Georgiana Stanhope (died 1824), who married Frederick Richard West, a grandson of John West, 2nd Earl De La Warr. The marriage was childless.
- George Stanhope, 6th Earl of Chesterfield (1805–1866).

The Countess of Chesterfield died at Chesterfield House, Mayfair, London, in May 1813, aged 50. Lord Chesterfield survived her by two years and died at Bretby, Derbyshire, in August 1815, aged 59. He was succeeded in the earldom by his only son, George.

Political offices
| Preceded by The Earl of Effingham | Master of the Mint; 1789–1790 | Succeeded by The Marquess Townshend |
| Preceded by The Lord Walsingham; The Earl of Westmorland | Postmaster General; 1790–1798; With: The Lord Walsingham 1790–1794; The Earl of Leicester 1794–1798 | Succeeded by The Earl of Leicester; The Lord Auckland |
| Preceded by The Earl of Westmorland | Master of the Horse; 1798–1804 | Succeeded by The Marquess of Hertford |
Honorary titles
| Preceded by The Lord le Despencer | Lord Lieutenant of Buckinghamshire; 1781–1782 | Succeeded by The Earl Temple |
Peerage of England
| Preceded by Philip Stanhope | Earl of Chesterfield; 1773–1815 | Succeeded by George Stanhope |
