= William Dodd (priest) =

English Anglican clergyman and forger

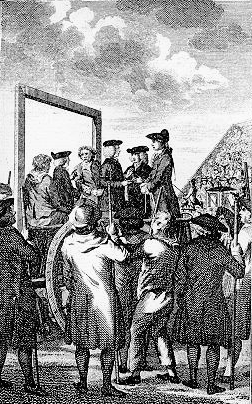
- William Dodd at the place of execution at Tyburn.
- Born: 29 May 1729; Bourne, Lincolnshire, England
- Died: 27 June 1777 (aged 48); Tyburn, London, England
- Occupations: British writer and clergyman, hanged for forgery

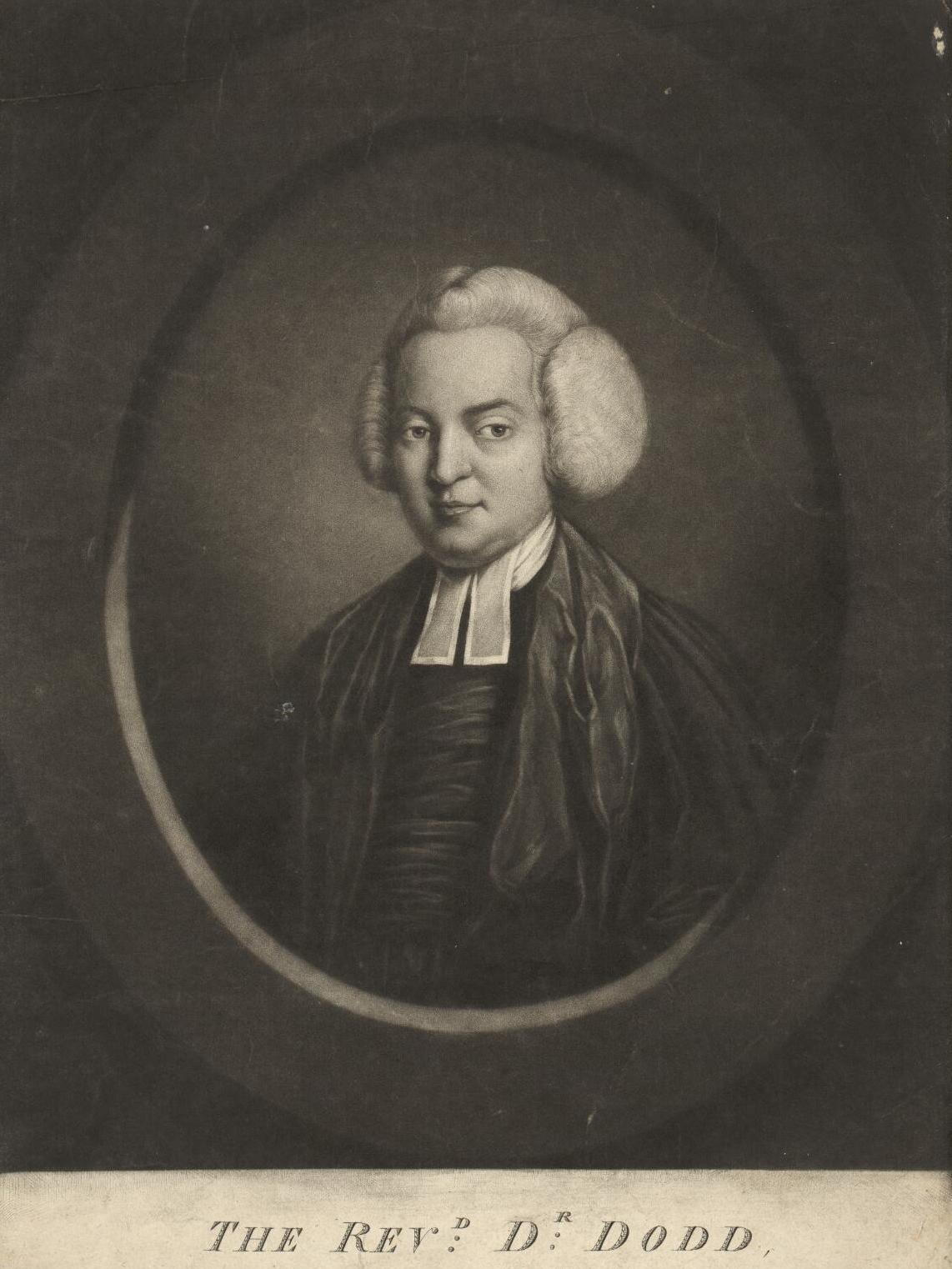
Portrait of William Dodd

Dr. Dodd in The Chronicles of Newgate, ed. Arthur Griffiths

William Dodd (29 May 1729 – 27 June 1777) was an English Anglican clergyman and a man of letters. He lived extravagantly, and was nicknamed the "Macaroni Parson". He dabbled in forgery in an effort to clear his debts, and was caught and convicted. Despite a public campaign for a Royal pardon, in which he received the assistance of Samuel Johnson, he was hanged at Tyburn for forgery.

== Biography ==
=== Early life ===
Dodd was born in Bourne in Lincolnshire, the son of the local vicar. He attended Clare Hall in the University of Cambridge from 1745 to 1750, where he achieved academic success and graduated as a wrangler. He then moved to London, where his spendthrift habits soon left him in debt. He married impulsively on 15 April 1751, to Mary Perkins, daughter of a domestic servant, leaving his finances in an even more precarious position.

=== Priesthood ===
At the urging of his concerned father, he decided to take holy orders, and was ordained a deacon in 1751. He was ordained as a priest on 19 October 1753. He served as a curate in a church in West Ham, then as a preacher at St James Garlickhythe, and then at St Olave Hart Street. He became a popular and fashionable preacher, and was appointed as a chaplain in ordinary to the King in 1763. He became a prebend in Brecon, and was a tutor to Philip Stanhope, later 5th Earl of Chesterfield. He became chaplain to the King, and became a Doctor of Laws at Cambridge University in 1766.

After he won £1,000 in a lottery, he became involved in schemes to build the Charlotte Chapel in Pimlico, and bought a share of the Charlotte Chapel in Bloomsbury. Despite his profession, he continued his extravagant lifestyle, and became known as the "macaroni parson". In 1772, he became rector of Hockliffe, in Bedfordshire, and vicar of Chalgrave.

=== Bribery ===
In 1774, in an attempt to rectify his depleted finances, he attempted to obtain the lucrative position of rector of St George's, Hanover Square. He caused an anonymous letter to be sent to Lady Apsley, wife of the Lord Chancellor, Henry Bathurst, offering her £3,000 to secure the position. The letter was traced back to Dodd, and he was dismissed from his existing posts. He became an object of public ridicule, and was taunted as Dr Simony in a play by Samuel Foote in the Haymarket Theatre. He spent two years abroad, in Geneva and France, until the scandal subsided. He returned to England in 1776. In The Luck of Barry Lyndon, Thackeray has his protagonist refer to meeting "Dr Simony" in Soho and to a friendship with Foote.

=== Forgery and execution ===
In February 1777, he forged a bond for £4,200 in the name of his former pupil, the Earl of Chesterfield, to clear his debts. A banker accepted the bond in good faith, and lent him money on the strength of it. Later the banker noticed a small blot in the text and had the document re-written. When the clean copy was presented to the Earl to sign, in order to replace the old one, the forgery was discovered. Dodd immediately confessed, and begged time to make amends. He was, however, imprisoned in the Wood Street Compter pending trial. He was convicted, and sentenced to death. Samuel Johnson wrote several papers in his defence, and some 23,000 people signed a 37-page petition seeking a pardon. Nevertheless, Dodd was publicly hanged at Tyburn on 27 June 1777.

The following appears as a footnote in the book Street Lore of Bath written by R. E. M. Peach and published in 1893. Dr. Dodd had provided the opening sermon at a newly built chapel in Bath in 1773.

1 THE EXECUTION OF THE UNFORTUNATE DR. DODD.

The following faithful description of the last moments and ignominious death of the clever writer and "fashionable parson" Dr. Dodd, for forgery in the year 1777, is taken from some interesting papers on that gifted but unhappy man in the Dublin University Magazine for the month:

When they went to call the hapless criminal, he did not at first recollect what was to take place, but presently on its coming back upon him, suffered the most dreadful horror "and agony of mind," and became outrageously vehement in his speech and looks; but on coming out of the chapel his face was seen to exhibit the greatest calmness and composure.

Mr. Villette, who filled the dreadful office of "Ordinary of Newgate," attended on him, together with the chaplain of Magdalen, Mr. Dobey. The friends who had been there the preceding night also appeared upon this occasion; and all moved on to the chapel. In the vestry they met the other criminal, who was to suffer also - Harris, the youth convicted for the "two half-sovereigns and some silver," and who had attempted suicide in his cell. Him, Dr. Dodd addressed with "great tenderness and emotion of heart" on the great heinousness of his offence, and begged that the other clergyman might be called in to assist in moving the heart of the poor youth. But "the Doctor's words," says one who stood by "were the most pathetic and effective." All who looked on were greatly affected and shed tears. The Doctor seems to have been a poor craven hearted creature all through. He kept up his dandyism, but he shewed neither resignation nor courage. "The executioner took both the hat and wig off at the same time. Why he put on his wig again I do not know, but he did, and the doctor took off his wig a second time, and then tied on a night cap which did not fit him : but whether he stretched that or took another, I could not perceive. He then put on his night cap himself, and upon him taking it he certainly had a smile on his countenance, and very soon afterwards there was an end of all his hopes and fears on this side the grave." Storer to George Selwyn.

As the unhappy man got out of the coach by which he was conveyed to Tyburn, and entered the cart, a heavy shower of rain fell, during which an umbrella was held over his head, which Gilly Williams, who was present, observed was quite unnecessary, as the doctor was going to a place where he might be dried.

=== Published works ===
He wrote several published works, including poems, a novel, and theological tracts. His most successful work was The Beauties of Shakespeare (1752), in which he may be said to have invented the "index.". He also wrote a Commentary on the Bible (1765–1770), and composed the blank verse Thoughts in Prison while in Newgate Prison between his conviction and execution.

=== "It concentrates his mind wonderfully" ===
Dodd's sermon The Convict's Address to his unhappy Brethren was largely written by Samuel Johnson to be used as Dodd's own. When one of Johnson's friends doubted the authorship, Johnson, in order to protect Dodd, made his famous remark "Depend upon it Sir, when a man knows he is to be hanged in a fortnight, it concentrates his mind wonderfully". James Boswell gives Johnson's explanation of the circumstances in his Life of Samuel Johnson:

Johnson disapproved of Dr. Dodd's leaving the world persuaded that The Convict's Address to his unhappy Brethren was of his own writing. 'But, Sir, (said I,) you contributed to the deception; for when Mr. Seward expressed a doubt to you that it was not Dodd's own, because it had a great deal more force of mind in it than any thing known to be his, you answered, --"Why should you think so? Depend upon it, Sir, when a man knows he is to be hanged in a fortnight, it concentrates his mind wonderfully."' JOHNSON. Sir, as Dodd got it from me to pass as his own, while that could do him any good, there was an IMPLIED PROMISE that I should not own it. To own it, therefore, would have been telling a lie, with the addition of breach of promise, which was worse than simply telling a lie to make it be believed it was Dodd's. Besides, Sir, I did not DIRECTLY tell a lie: I left the matter uncertain. Perhaps I thought that Seward would not believe it the less to be mine for what I said; but I would not put it in his power to say I had owned it.'
