= Jacques Georges Deyverdun =

Swiss scholar (1734–1789)

- Born: 8 May 1734; Lausanne, Vaud, Switzerland
- Died: 4 July 1789 (aged 55); Aix-les-Bains, Savoy
- Education: Academy of Lausanne
- Occupations: Classical scholar, translator
- Relatives: Charles Guillaume Loys de Bochat (uncle)
- Writing career
- Language: French
- Notable work: French translation of The Sorrows of Young Werther
- Literary movement: Enlightenment

Jacques Georges Deyverdun (8 May 1734 – 4 July 1789) was a Swiss classical scholar and translator. He translated Goethe's The Sorrows of Young Werther into French.

== Biography ==
Originally from Yverdon, Deyverdun was born on 8 May 1734 in Lausanne, Vaud, the son of Samuel Deyverdun, an assessor at Lausanne's Council of Sixty, and Madeleine Teissonière. He was a nephew of Charles Guillaume Loys de Bochat. In 1753, while studying at the Academy of Lausanne, Deyverdun met Edward Gibbon and the two became friends. He went to England in 1765 and collaborated with Gibbon in his Mémoires littéraires de la Grande-Bretagne (1767–1768). He also acted as tutor to several English noblemen on the Grand Tour such as Philip Stanhope, 5th Earl of Chesterfield and Sir Richard Worsley, 7th Baronet.

After his return to Lausanne, Deyverdun founded the Société littéraire in 1772. In 1776, he translated The Sorrows of Young Werther, likely the first French translation of the work. Deyverdun died on 4 July 1789 in Aix-les-Bains, Savoy.
