= Henry Newman (SPCK) =

Henry Newman (1670–1743), from the Province of Massachusetts Bay, settled in England in 1703 and became a mission administrator with the Society for Promoting Christian Knowledge (SPCK) in 1708.

== Early life ==
He was born at Rehoboth, Massachusetts, the son of the minister the Rev. Noah Newman and his wife Joanna Flint or Flynt. He was an orphan by the age of ten. He was educated at Harvard College from 1683, graduating BA in 1687 and MA in 1690. From 1690 to 1693 he had a position at Harvard as Librarian. Henry Flynt, his first cousin, was a long-term Harvard tutor. Newman retained New England connections for the rest of his life, acting as agent for the College and for the Province of New Hampshire.

Newman was intended for the Congregational ministry, but at Harvard encountered works by Church of England authors. He had strong family connections to the Puritan tradition in New England; his maternal grandfather was the Rev. Henry Flynt of Quincy, and Leonard Hoar of Harvard was his great-uncle. His paternal grandfather was Samuel Newman, a young graduate of St Edmund Hall in 1620 ordained in 1622 by Tobias Matthew, who emigrated from Woodkirk in 1638 after repeated prosecution. In King Philip's War his father Noah organised a party to track down Metacomet. After Noah's death in 1678, John Cotton junior wrote an elegy for him. In 1719 Newman was on good terms with Cotton Mather, as correspondence shows, who had no time for the Society for the Propagation of the Gospel in Foreign Parts (SPG), and was in touch with Benjamin Colman, another New England Puritan.

In early life Newman was in commerce in North America. From around 1703 he was in England, where for about five years he was employed by Charles Seymour, 6th Duke of Somerset.

== SPCK secretary ==
Newman joined the SPCK in 1703, in Newfoundland where he was a fish merchant. By about 1706 he was acting as secretary to the society's book committee. At this time the scope of the SPCK's evangelism was at home and in the British colonies. In politics, Newman as a follower of the Whig Duke of Somerset favoured the presaged Hanoverian succession to Queen Anne. It made him a good fit with the aspiration of Thomas Bray, founder in 1698 of the SPCK, to secure the society's future. Newman's 1708 appointment as secretary signalled that the SPCK was not under the thumb of the Tories, who had made major inroads into control of the charity school movement, as Newman himself observed some years later. He replaced Humphrey Wanley who had treated the post as a sinecure.

Early in the century, Newman formed a bridge between New England Puritans such as Cotton and Increase Mather, and Pietists in Germany. It went via Anton Wilhelm Böhme in London to August Hermann Francke. In 1731 Newman was in contact with the expelled Salzburg Protestants through Samuel Urlsperger.

Newman was dominant in the SPCK of the 1720s and 1730s, with Sir John Philipps, 4th Baronet. During this period the SPCK built up a major role supporting printed matter and libraries that forwarded the Anglican positions. Newman was able to work with James Oglethorpe and John Perceval, 1st Earl of Egmont at the time the Province of Georgia was founded, and Thomas Coram of the Foundling Hospital.

=== Missionaries for India ===
When the SPG was set up by Thomas Bray a few years after the SPCK, it was initially supposed to take over work in the "plantations" (colonies) from the SPCK. This demarcation, however, did not last long in practice. In particular the SPCK supported Protestant outreach in India from 1710 to 1825.

Newman was keen already in 1713 for the SPCK to find a candidate missionary for committed work in India. Griffith Jones on consideration turned down the chance. Newman involved Thomas Wilson in trying to recruit for the mission. On Wilson's recommendation James Christian was given a trial in 1729; but he wanted to drive a hard bargain on terms to go to Tranquebar. This mission issue became a major preoccupation for Newman. Newman then led the SPCK into employing Lutherans as missionaries, leading to some criticism from the High Church wing of the Church of England.

In 1733 Newman was reprimanded by the SPCK for trying to handle affairs in Madras around Benjamin Schultze on his own. Schulze had been part of the mission in the Danish territory at Tranquebar, but had on his own initiative moved into Madras, where he was granted SPCK support. In this way the Madras "English mission" was founded.

== Death ==
Henry Newman died unmarried at home in Bartlett's Buildings, Holborn, London on 15 June 1743.
