= Louisa Finch, Countess of Aylesford =

English painter (1760–1832)

The Right Honourable Louisa Finch
- Countess of Aylesford
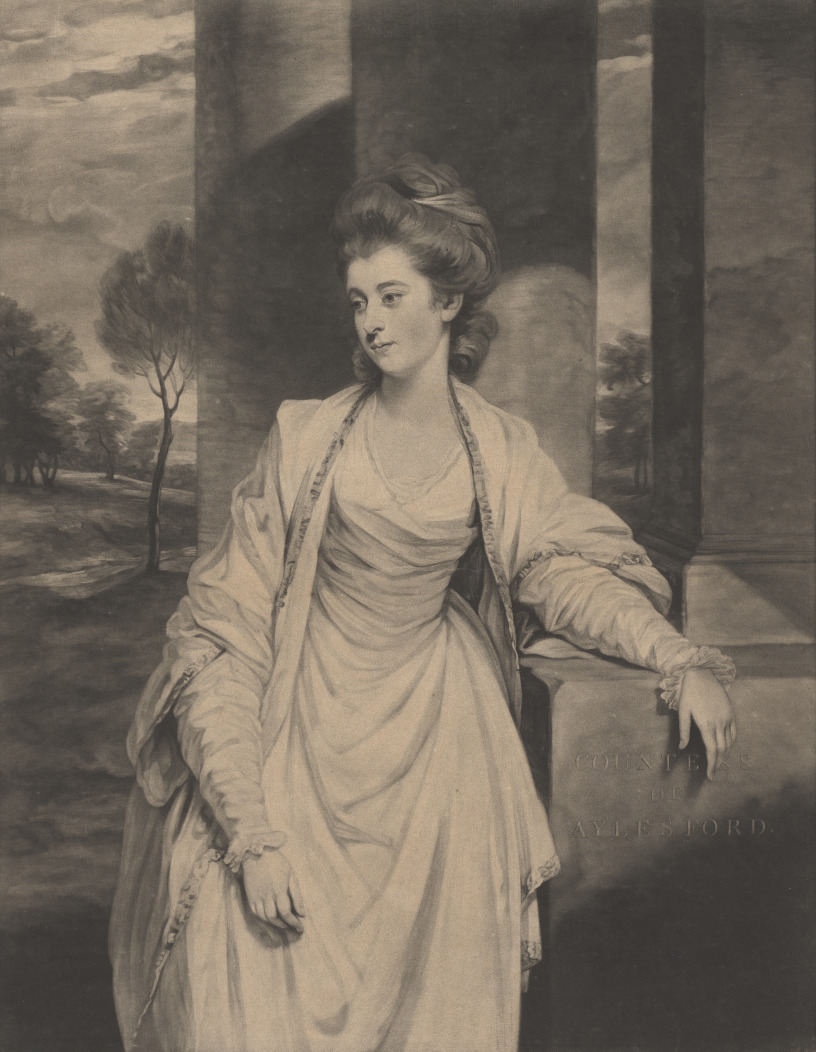
- Louisa, Countess of Aylesford (1783) by Valentine Green after Sir Joshua Reynolds
- Born: Hon. Louisa Thynne; 25 March 1760
- Died: 28 December 1832 (aged 72); Packington Hall, Great Packington, Warwickshire, England
- Noble family: Thynne
- Spouse: Heneage Finch, 4th Earl of Aylesford
- Issue: 13, including Heneage Finch, 5th Earl of Aylesford
- Father: Thomas Thynne, 1st Marquess of Bath
- Mother: Lady Elizabeth Bentinck
- Occupation: Naturalist, botanical illustrator

Louisa Finch, Countess of Aylesford (née Thynne; 25 March 1760 – 28 December 1832) was an English naturalist and botanical illustrator who made studies and paintings of the plants, algae, and fungi from the Warwickshire area.

== Life ==
She was born the eldest daughter of the politician Thomas Thynne, 1st Marquess of Bath, and his wife, the former Lady Elizabeth Bentinck. In 1781 she married Heneage Finch, 4th Earl of Aylesford. She had thirteen children, including Heneage Finch, 5th Earl of Aylesford. She was widowed in 1812. In 1816, she leased Stanmore Park House, Stanmore, Middlesex: the site is now a housing estate, Lady Aylesford Avenue. She died at the age of 72 at the family home of Packington Hall.

== Botany ==
Upon settling in Warwickshire, the Countess of Aylesford took to studying the region's flora. She produced over 2,800 botanical watercolour drawings and was a correspondent of botanists such as William Withering, William Thomas Bree, and George Don. Additionally, she documented about 30 first records of plants from Warwickshire.

She amassed an extensive collection of minerals, which was acquired by Henry Heuland after her death. Her plants are collected in Oxford University, and her minerals and manuscripts in the Natural History Museum.

== Marriage and issue ==
Lady Louisa married Heneage Finch, 4th Earl of Aylesford, on 18 November 1781. They lived at Packington Hall near Meriden, Warwickshire and had thirteen children:

- Charles Finch, Lord Guernsey (b. 1784 - d. 18 July 1794)
- Heneage Finch, 5th Earl of Aylesford (1786–1859)
- Hon. Daniel Finch (25 February 1789 – 17 January 1868), artist.
- Lady Frances Finch (c. 1791 – 12 July 1886), unmarried.
- Hon. Edward Finch (1792 – 9 April 1830)
- Lieutenant-General the Hon. John Finch (1793 – 25 November 1861), married in 1835 Katherine Ellice (d. 1872)
- Hon. Henry Finch (1795–1829)
- Lady Charlotte Finch (d. 17 January 1869), married Charles Palmer on 22 January 1823.
- Hon. Charles Finch (b. 1799)
- Lady Mary Finch (d. 24 July 1823)
- Lady Elizabeth Finch (d. 1 June 1879)
- Lady Henrietta Finch (d. 1828)
- Lady Caroline Finch (d. 1821)

== Arms ==
Coat of arms of Louisa Finch, Countess of Aylesford
Coronet Coronet of an Earl Escutcheon Argent a chevron between three griffins passant Sable (Heneage Finch, 4th Earl of Aylesford) impaling quarterly 1st & 4th barry of ten Or and Sable 2nd & 3rd Argent a lion rampant tail nowed and erect Gules (Thomas Thynne, 1st Marquess of Bath). Supporters Dexter a griffin Sable ducally gorged Or sinister a lion Or ducally gorged Azure.
