= Thomas Thynne, 1st Marquess of Bath =

British politician

The Most Honourable The Marquess of Bath KG PC
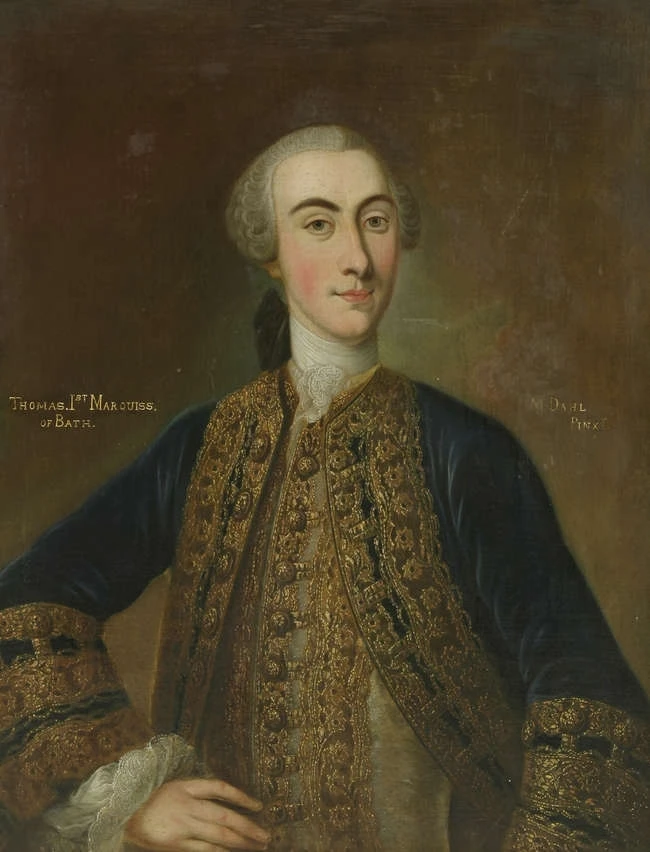
- Portrait of Bath by the circle of Enoch Seeman

Secretary of State for the Northern Department
- In office 7 March 1779 – 27 October 1779
- Monarch: George III
- Prime Minister: Lord North
- Preceded by: The Earl of Suffolk
- Succeeded by: The Viscount Stormont
- In office 20 January 1768 – 21 October 1768
- Monarch: George III
- Prime Minister: William Pitt the Elder; The Duke of Grafton
- Preceded by: Henry Seymour Conway
- Succeeded by: The Earl of Rochford

Secretary of State for the Southern Department
- In office 9 November 1775 – 24 November 1779
- Monarch: George III
- Prime Minister: Lord North
- Preceded by: The Earl of Rochford
- Succeeded by: The Earl of Hillsborough
- In office 21 October 1768 – 12 December 1770
- Monarch: George III
- Prime Minister: The Duke of Grafton; Lord North
- Preceded by: The Earl of Shelburne
- Succeeded by: The Earl of Rochford

Lord Lieutenant of Ireland
- In office 5 June 1765 – 7 August 1765
- Monarch: George III
- Preceded by: The Earl of Northumberland
- Succeeded by: The Earl of Hertford

Personal details
- Born: The Hon. Thomas Thynne; 13 September 1734
- Died: 19 November 1796 (aged 62) St George Hanover Square, Westminster, Middlesex, England
- Party: Tory
- Spouse: Lady Elizabeth Bentinck (m. 1759)
- Children: 6, including Louisa, Henrietta, Thomas, George, and John
- Parents: Thomas Thynne, 2nd Viscount Weymouth; Louisa Carteret
- Education: St John's College, Cambridge
- Occupation: Politician

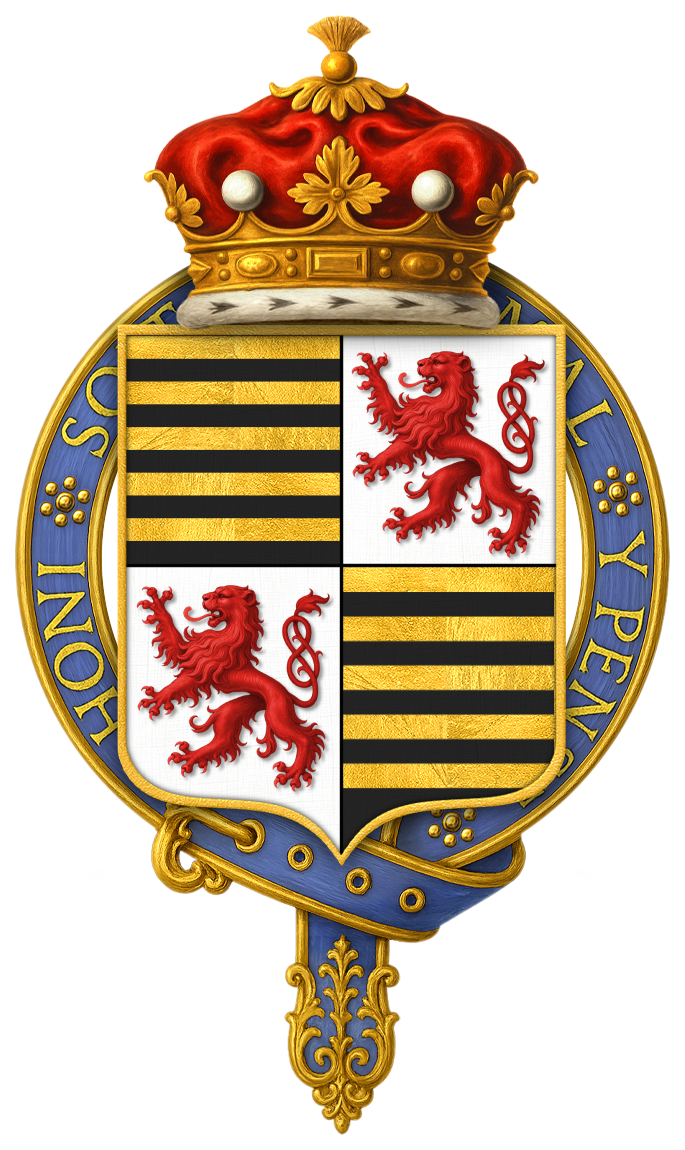
Quartered arms of Thomas Thynne, 1st Marquess of Bath, KG, PC

Thomas Thynne, 1st Marquess of Bath (13 September 1734 – 19 November 1796), styled Viscount Weymouth between 1751 and 1789, was a British politician who held several offices during the reign of King George III. He served as Southern Secretary, Northern Secretary and Lord Lieutenant of Ireland. Bath is possibly best known for his role in the Falklands Crisis of 1770.

== Early life ==
He was born on 13 September 1734, the eldest son and heir of Thomas Thynne, 2nd Viscount Weymouth (1710–1751) by his wife Louisa Carteret (c. 1712–1736), a daughter of John Carteret, 2nd Earl Granville, 2nd Baron Carteret (1690–1763). On her father's side, she was a great-granddaughter of John Granville, 1st Earl of Bath (1628–1701), and her father's first-cousin was William Granville, 3rd Earl of Bath (1692–1711), on whose death the Earldom of Bath became extinct.

=== Family origins ===
The Thynnes are descended from Sir John Thynne (c. 1515–1580), the builder of Longleat House, the family seat in Wiltshire, who acquired vast estates after the Dissolution of the Monasteries. Sir John owed his wealth and position to the favour of his master, the Lord Protector Edward Seymour, 1st Duke of Somerset. He was comptroller of the household of the future Queen Elizabeth I of England. Another famous ancestor was Thomas Thynne (1648–1682), called on account of his wealth "Tom of Ten Thousand" and celebrated by Dryden as Issachar in Absalom and Achitophel, who was murdered in London in February 1682.

== Career ==
He succeeded his father as 3rd Viscount Weymouth in January 1751 and served as Lord Lieutenant of Ireland for a short time during 1765, although he never visited that country. Having become prominent in British politics as an influential member of the Bloomsbury Gang, he was appointed Secretary of State for the Northern Department in January 1768 and acted with great promptitude during the unrest caused by John Wilkes and the Middlesex election of 1768. He was then attacked and libeled by Wilkes, who was consequently expelled from the House of Commons.

=== Falklands Crisis ===
Before the close of 1768, he was transferred from the Northern Department to become Secretary of State for the Southern Department, but he resigned in December 1770 in the midst of the Falklands Crisis of 1770, a dispute with Spain over the possession of the Falkland Islands.

=== American War of Independence ===
In November 1775, Weymouth returned to his former office of Secretary of State for the Southern Department, undertaking in addition the duties attached to the northern department for a few months in 1779, but he resigned both positions in the autumn of that year. This period covered the American War of Independence.

== Later life ==
He was High Steward of the Royal Town of Sutton Coldfield from 1781 until his death in November 1796, having been created Marquess of Bath in 1789. The title of Earl of Bath that had been held by his Granville ancestor was then unavailable, as it had been recreated for a member of the Pulteney family.

== Marriage and issue ==
In 1759, he married Lady Elizabeth Bentinck, daughter of William Bentinck, 2nd Duke of Portland and the art collector Margaret Bentinck, Duchess of Portland, with whom he had three sons and five daughters, including:

- Lady Louisa Thynne (born 25 March 1760)
- Lady Henrietta Thynne (born 16 November 1762)
- Lady Sophia Thynne (born 18 December 1763)
- Thomas Thynne, 2nd Marquess of Bath (25 January 1765 – 27 March 1837), eldest son and heir.
- Lady Maria Thynne (born 1 August 1767, died March 1768)
- Lady Isabella Thynne (born 1 October 1768)
- George Thynne, 2nd Baron Carteret (23 January 1770 – 19 February 1838), who inherited the title Baron Carteret by special remainder from his paternal uncle Henry Carteret, 1st Baron Carteret (1735–1826) (born Henry Thynne), of Haynes Park in Bedfordshire and of Stowe House, Kilkhampton in Cornwall, the seat of his ancestor John Granville, 1st Earl of Bath (1628–1701), which descended via the Carteret family.
- John Thynne, 3rd Baron Carteret (28 December 1772 – 10 March 1849)

== Legacy ==
Weymouth Street in Marylebone is named after him. His wife's family once owned the land on which the street was later built.

Political offices
Preceded by The Earl Harcourt	Master of the Horse to Queen Charlotte; 1763–1765	Succeeded by The Duke of Ancaster and Kesteven
Preceded by The Earl of Northumberland	Lord Lieutenant of Ireland; 1765	Succeeded by The Earl of Hertford
Preceded by Henry Seymour Conway	Secretary of State for the Northern Department; 1768	Succeeded by The Earl of Rochford
Preceded by The Earl of Shelburne	Secretary of State for the Southern Department; 1768–1770	Succeeded by The Earl of Rochford
Preceded by The Duke of Grafton	Leader of the House of Lords; 1770	Succeeded by The Earl of Rochford
Preceded by The Earl of Rochford	Secretary of State for the Southern Department; 1775–1779	Succeeded by The Earl of Hillsborough
Preceded by The Earl of Suffolk	Secretary of State for the Northern Department; 1779	Succeeded by The Viscount Stormont
Preceded by The Earl of Suffolk	Leader of the House of Lords; 1779	Succeeded by The Viscount Stormont
Court offices
Preceded by The Earl of Ashburnham	Groom of the Stole; 1782–1796	Succeeded by The Duke of Roxburghe
Honorary titles
Preceded by The Lord Middleton	High Steward of Sutton Coldfield; 1781–1796	Succeeded by The Earl of Aylesford
Titles of nobility
New creation	Marquess of Bath; 1789–1796	Succeeded by Thomas Thynne
Preceded by Thomas Thynne	Viscount Weymouth; 1751–1796	Succeeded by Thomas Thynne
