= Charlotte Seymour, Duchess of Somerset =

Second wife of Charles Seymour, 6th Duke of Somerset

Her Grace The Duchess of Somerset
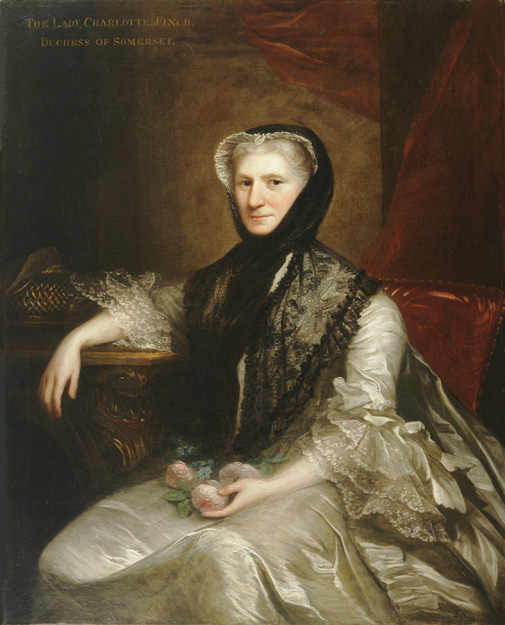
- Born: Charlotte Finch c. 1693
- Died: 21 January 1773 (aged c. 80)
- Spouse: Charles Seymour, 6th Duke of Somerset (m. 1725; died 1748)
- Children: Frances Manners, Marchioness of Granby; Charlotte Finch, Countess of Aylesford
- Parent(s): Daniel Finch, 7th Earl of Winchilsea; Anne Hatton

Charlotte Seymour, Duchess of Somerset (née Finch; c. 1693 – 21 January 1773) was the second wife of Charles Seymour, 6th Duke of Somerset. Lady Charlotte was the first of twenty-one 'ladies of quality and distinction' who signed Thomas Coram's first petition, presented to King George II in 1735, calling for the establishment of the Foundling Hospital.

== Biography ==
Lady Charlotte was a daughter of Daniel Finch, 7th Earl of Winchilsea, 2nd Earl of Nottingham, by his second wife, the former Hon. Anne Hatton. She married the Duke of Somerset on 4 February 1726, and the marriage was not a happy one. He was known as "The Proud Duke", and is said to have reproached her, after she had gently tapped him on the shoulder with her fan, with the words: "Madam, my first wife was a Percy and she never took such a liberty". The duke had for some years been corresponding with Sarah Churchill, Duchess of Marlborough, now widowed, and continued to write to her after remarrying.

== Age controversy ==
Burke's Peerage lists Lady Charlotte's year of birth as 1711, making her just 14 years old when she married the 63 year old Duke. However, correspondence between one of her descendants and the curator of the Foundling Museum's 2018 exhibition, "Ladies of Quality & Distinction", cites the family bible, which gives her year of birth as 1693. This is also the birth year engraved on her grave stone.

== Family ==
She married Charles Seymour, 6th Duke of Somerset as his second wife, the duke already had children from his marriage to Lady Elizabeth Percy, who died in 1722. By Lady Charlotte, he had two further children:

- Lady Frances Seymour (18 July 1728 – 25 January 1761), who married John Manners, Marquess of Granby, and had children including Charles Manners, 4th Duke of Rutland.
- Lady Charlotte Seymour (21 September 1730 – 15 February 1805), who married Heneage Finch, 3rd Earl of Aylesford, her second cousin, and had children.

The duke was a strict father, and required Lady Frances and Lady Charlotte to stand and watch him taking his afternoon nap. If he woke and found that one of them was not paying attention, he threatened to disinherit her.

Copies of letters sent by Charlotte to her father are held in the National Archives. In Eliza Haywood's 1726 satire, The Secret History of the Present Intrigues of the Court of Carimania, the duchess is referred to under the pseudonym of "Euridice", while the duke was "Doraspe".

The duke died at the family seat of Petworth House in 1748, aged 86. He left his two youngest daughter hefty inheritances and the duchess just £1000 annuity and a farm, he probably hoped that their two daughters and their inheritances would support their mother.

Lady Charlotte died on 21 January 1773.

== The Foundling Hospital ==
In his efforts to establish the first Foundling Hospital, Thomas Coram approached ladies of nobility to support his petition to King George II. Lady Charlotte, Duchess of Somerset, was his first signatory, signing the petition on 9 March 1729 at Petworth. It is not known how Coram was introduced to Lady Charlotte. McClure suggests that it may have been through Henry Newman, secretary of the SPCK, to which Coram belonged.

In his notebooks, Coram noted the date on which each of the lady petitioners signed in a list captioned "An Exact Account when each Lady of Charity Signed their Declaration".
