= Charles Seymour, 6th Duke of Somerset =

English peer (1662–1748)

His Grace The Duke of Somerset KG PC
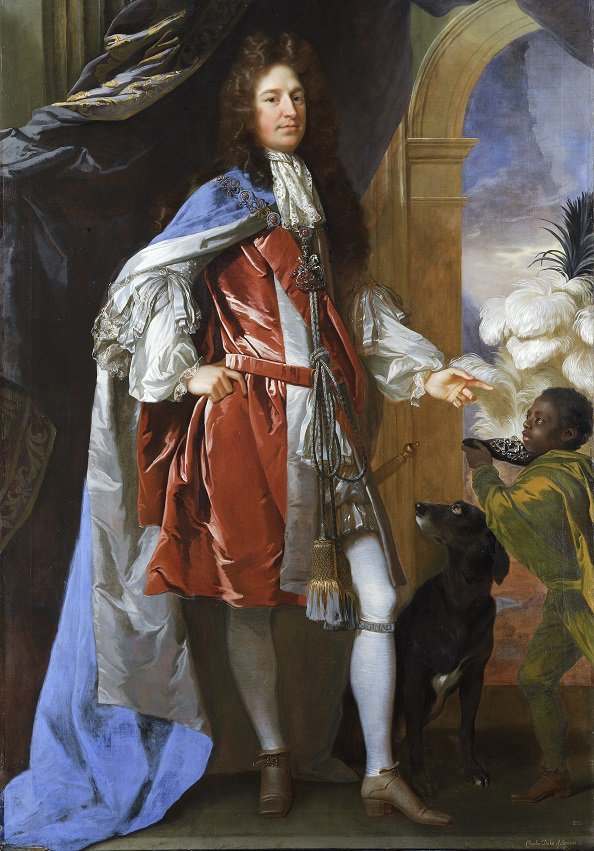
- Portrait by John Closterman, c. 1690–1692

Lord President of the Council
- In office 29 January – 13 July 1702
- Monarchs: William III; Anne
- Preceded by: Thomas Herbert, 8th Earl of Pembroke
- Succeeded by: Thomas Herbert, 8th Earl of Pembroke

Personal details
- Born: 13 August 1662 Wiltshire, England
- Died: 2 December 1748 (aged 86) Petworth, Great Britain
- Resting place: the Seymour Chapel of Salisbury Cathedral
- Spouse(s): Lady Elizabeth Percy; Lady Charlotte Finch
- Children: 9, including Algernon
- Parent(s): Charles Seymour, 2nd Baron Seymour of Trowbridge (father); Elizabeth Alington (mother)

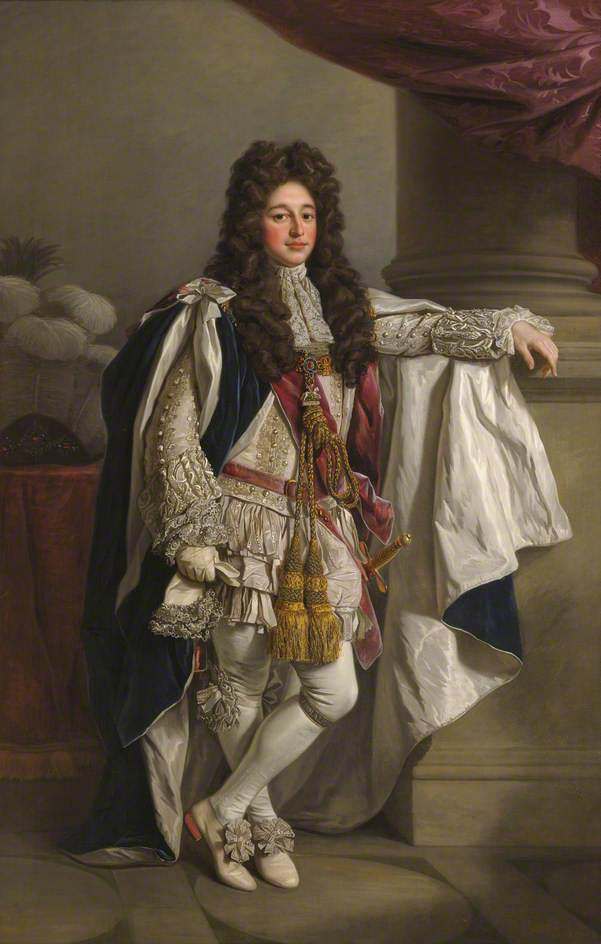
Charles Seymour, 6th Duke of Somerset, portrait by Nathaniel Dance-Holland (1735–1811) (presumably a copy, artist aged 13 at sitter's death), collection of Trinity College, Cambridge. He was Chancellor of the University of Cambridge 1689–1748

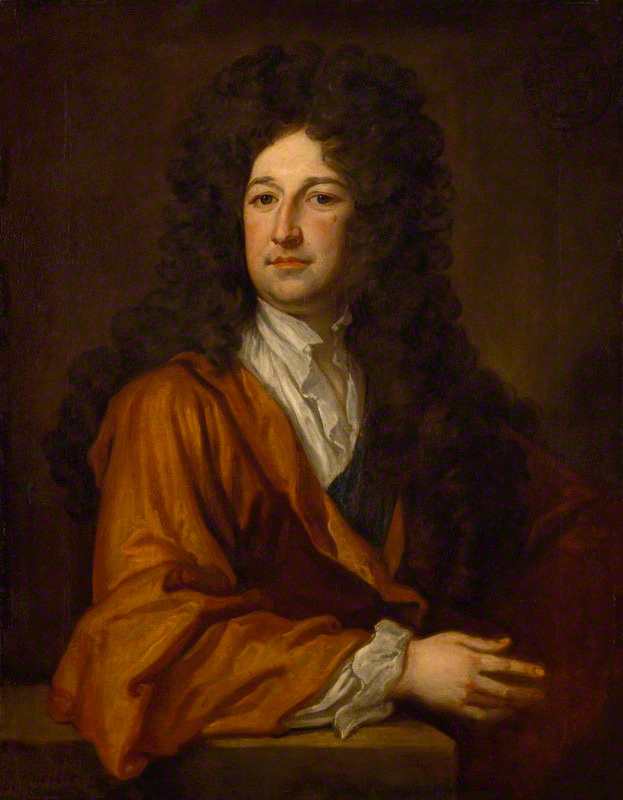
Charles Seymour, 6th Duke of Somerset, portrait c. 1703 by Godfrey Kneller, National Portrait Gallery, London

Charles Seymour, 6th Duke of Somerset, KG, PC, (13 August 1662 – 2 December 1748), known by the epithet "The Proud Duke", was an English aristocrat and courtier. He rebuilt Petworth House in Sussex, the ancient Percy seat inherited from his wife, in the palatial form which survives today. According to the Encyclopædia Britannica Eleventh Edition, he was a remarkably handsome man, and inordinately fond of taking a conspicuous part in court ceremonial. His vanity, which earned him the sobriquet of "the proud duke", was a byword among his contemporaries and was the subject of numerous anecdotes; Macaulay described him as "a man in whom the pride of birth and rank amounted almost to a disease".

== Origins ==
Charles Seymour was the second son of Charles Seymour, 2nd Baron Seymour of Trowbridge (died 1665), of Marlborough Castle in Wiltshire, by his wife Elizabeth Alington (1635–1692). The 2nd baron was (in a junior line) a great-great-grandson of Edward Seymour, 1st Duke of Somerset (executed 1552), brother of Queen Jane Seymour, uncle of King Edward VI and Lord Protector of England.

== Education ==
Charles was educated at Harrow School and Trinity College, Cambridge, where his portrait by Nathaniel Dance-Holland survives in the college's collection.

== Inherits dukedom of Somerset ==
In 1675, Charles's elder brother Francis Seymour, 5th Duke of Somerset, aged 16, inherited the Dukedom of Somerset from their father's childless first cousin, John Seymour, 4th Duke of Somerset (1629–1675). However, the 5th Duke did not inherit the unentailed Seymour estates, including the family seat of Wulfhall and other Wiltshire estates, and much of the lands of the feudal barony of Hatch Beauchamp in Somerset, which were bequeathed to the 4th duke's niece, Elizabeth Seymour, wife of Thomas Bruce, 2nd Earl of Ailesbury (1656–1741). In 1660, following the Restoration of the Monarchy, the 4th duke's own father, a Royalist commander in the Civil War, had been restored to the dukedom created for and forfeited by his own great-grandfather, Edward Seymour, 1st Duke of Somerset (executed 1552).

Three years later, in 1678, Charles's brother, the 5th duke, was murdered in Italy, aged 20, unmarried and without progeny, having been shot at the door of his inn at Lerici. The 16-year-old Charles Seymour became the 6th duke and the 4th Baron Seymour of Trowbridge.

== Percy inheritance ==
In 1682, at the age of 20 he married a great heiress, the 15-year-old Lady Elizabeth Percy (1667–1722), daughter and sole heiress of Joceline Percy, 11th Earl of Northumberland (1644–1670), who brought him immense estates, including Alnwick Castle, Northumberland; Petworth House, Sussex; Leconfield Castle, Yorkshire; Cockermouth Castle, Cumberland; Egremont Castle, Cumberland; Syon House, Middlesex, and Northumberland House in London. It had been agreed in the marriage settlement, although both parties to the marriage were minors, and thus legally incapable of being bound by a contract, that:

"... for the preservation of the noble family and name of the Percys, he the said duke and all and every the issue of his body on her the said duchess begotten, should forever take upon him and them and be called and named only by the name and surname of Percy".

However, on attaining her majority of 21 the duchess under her hand and seal dated 30 January 1687 consented to waive and dispense with the agreement. The intention stated in the marriage contract was however fulfilled in 1749 by their granddaughter Lady Elizabeth Seymour and her husband the former Sir Hugh Smithson, 4th Baronet (who by special remainder had inherited in 1749 his father-in-law's title Earl of Northumberland) when in 1749 they obtained a private act of Parliament entitled:

"An Act to enable Hugh Earl of Northumberland and Elizabeth Countess of Northumberland and Barones Percy, his Wife, and their Children, Progeny and Issue, to take and use the Name of Percy, and bear and quarter the Arms of the Percies Earls of Northumberland".

— Hugh Earl of Northumberland's Name and Arms Act 1749 (23 Geo. 2. c. 14 Pr.)

The reason for the name change was stated in the preamble to the act as follows:

"And as Algernon, late Duke of Somerset, did in his lifetime express his desire that the name of Percy should be used by and be the surname and family name of the Earls of Northumberland ... Sir Hugh Smithson now Earl of Northumberland and Lady Elizabeth his wife, Countess of Northumberland and Baroness Percy, as well out of their great regard to, and in compliance with the desire of, the said late duke, as for preserving the noble and ancient family and name of Percy and the coats of arms borne and quartered by the Percys Earls of Northumberland should be ... confirmed ... upon them ... by authority of Parliament".

== Rebuilds Petworth House ==
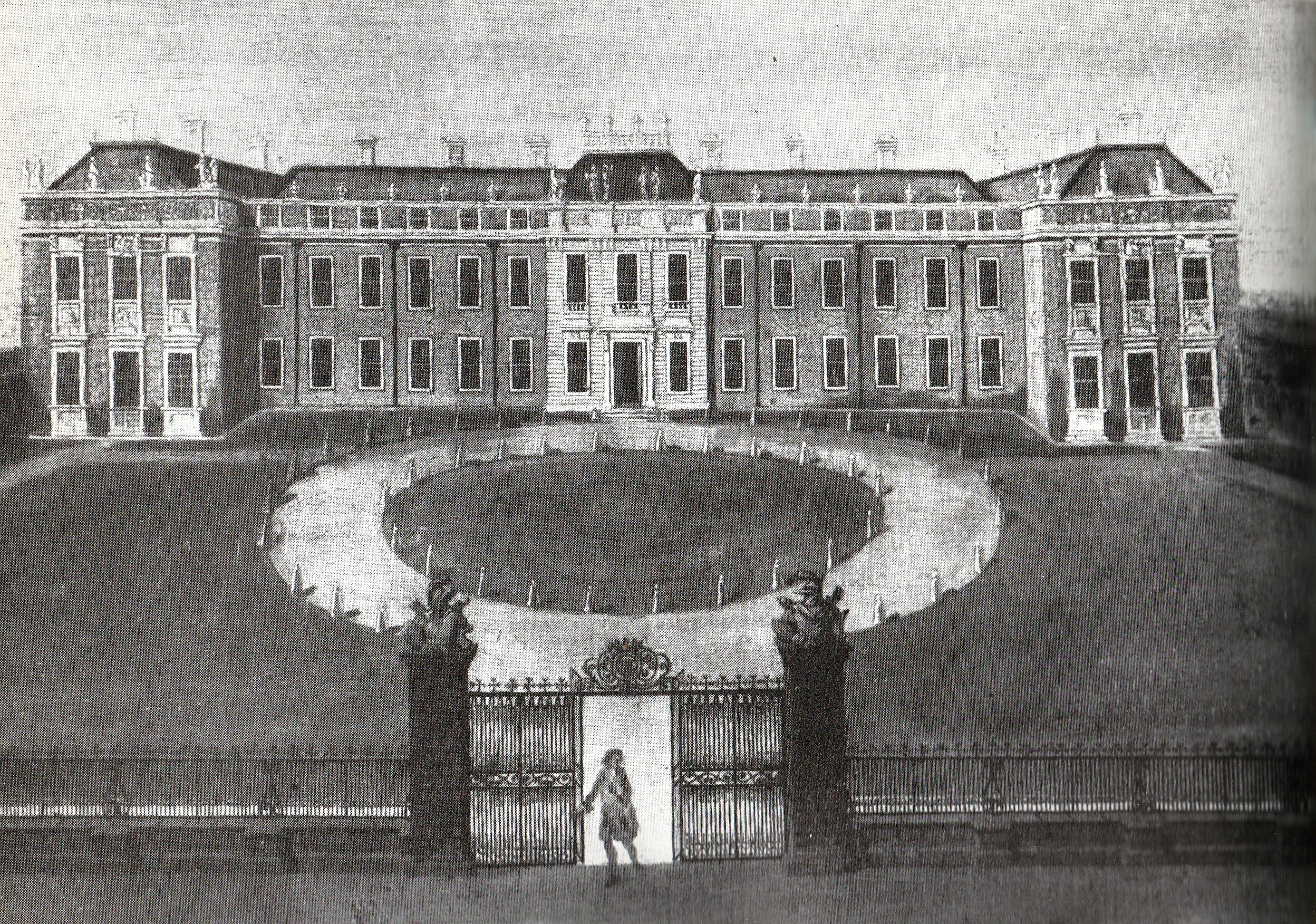
Petworth House in Sussex, west front, depicted in about 1700, as newly re-built by the 6th Duke of Somerset. Collection of the Duke of Rutland at Belvoir Castle

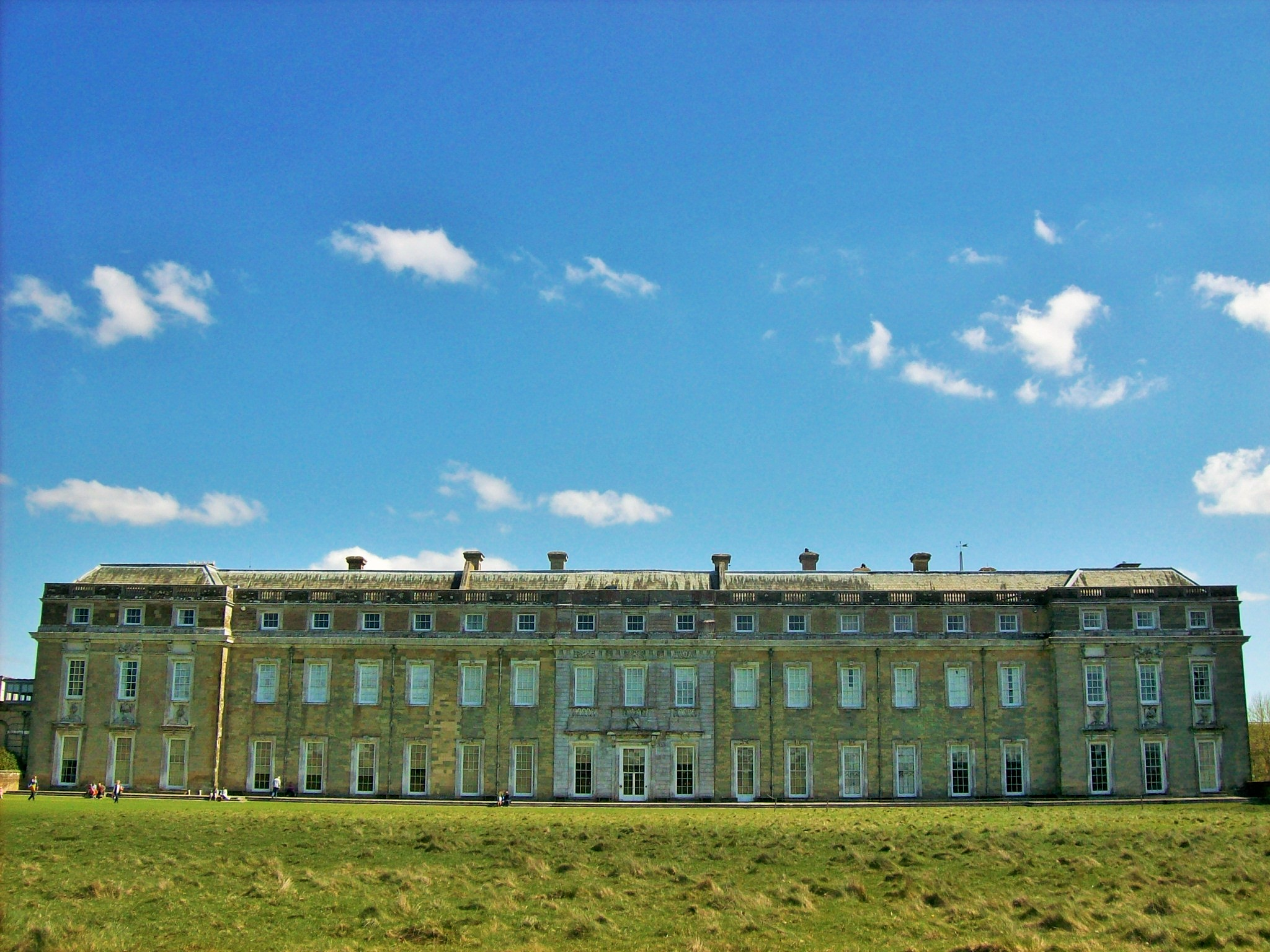
Petworth House, west front, in 2015, with flat roof line

Between 1688 and 1696 the Duke rebuilt Petworth House on a palatial scale. A painting made in about 1700 of his new house was identified by the art historian Sir Anthony Blunt in the collection of the Duke of Rutland at Belvoir Castle. It shows evidence of a French château style, with original central dome, now lost. A similar image is included in Louis Laguerre's wall-painting on the Grand Staircase at Petworth. Horace Walpole called it "in the style of the Tuileries". The parapets of the walls are surmounted by urns. On the three sections of the parapet in front of the central dome and the domed roofs of the two projecting wings are placed gesticulating statues. Today the roofline is lower and flat, giving the building a plain appearance, having been simplified later in the century due to changing tastes. The statues and urns were removed and the entrance front has been moved to the rear. One of the few elements of the old mansion he retained is the mediaeval chapel, which retains the large early 17th century Percy Window, depicting the coats of arms of several Percy Earls of Northumberland.

== Career ==
In 1683, Somerset received an appointment in the royal household of King Charles II and in August 1685 he was appointed Colonel of the Queen Consort's Light Dragoons when James II expanded his army after the Monmouth Rebellion. (Note: Commissions were private assets that could be bought, sold or used as an investment and many Colonels played no active military role.) However, he fell from favour in 1687 when as Lord of the Bedchamber he refused to escort the newly appointed Papal Nuncio, Archbishop Ferdinando d'Adda and was deprived of his various offices.

At the Glorious Revolution of 1689, he supported the Prince of Orange, who became King William III. Having befriended Princess Anne in 1692, he became a favourite of hers after her accession to the throne as Queen Anne (1702–1714), and was appointed by her in 1702 Master of the Horse, a post he held until 1712. Finding himself neglected by John Churchill, 1st Duke of Marlborough, he made friends with the Tories, and succeeded in retaining the Queen's confidence, while his wife replaced Sarah Churchill, Duchess of Marlborough as Mistress of the Robes in 1711. The Duchess of Somerset became the Queen's closest confidante, causing Jonathan Swift to direct at her a violent satire, The Windsor Prophecy, in which he accused her of murdering her previous husband, Thomas Thynne (died 1682) of Longleat. The Duchess retained her influence even after the Queen, following a quarrel, dismissed the Duke as Master of the Horse in 1712.

In the memorable crisis when Anne was at the point of death, Somerset acted with John Campbell, 2nd Duke of Argyll, Charles Talbot, 1st Duke of Shrewsbury and other Whig nobles who, by insisting on their right to be present in the Privy Council, secured the Hanoverian succession to the Crown.

He retained the office of Master of the Horse for the first year of the reign of King George I (1714–1727) until 1715, when he was dismissed and retired to private life.

In 1739, the Duke became a founding governor of the Foundling Hospital in London, the country's first and only children's home for foundlings, after his second wife, Charlotte Finch (1693–1773), became the first to sign the petition to King George II of its founder Captain Thomas Coram.

The Duke died at Petworth on 2 December 1748.

== Marriages and descendants ==
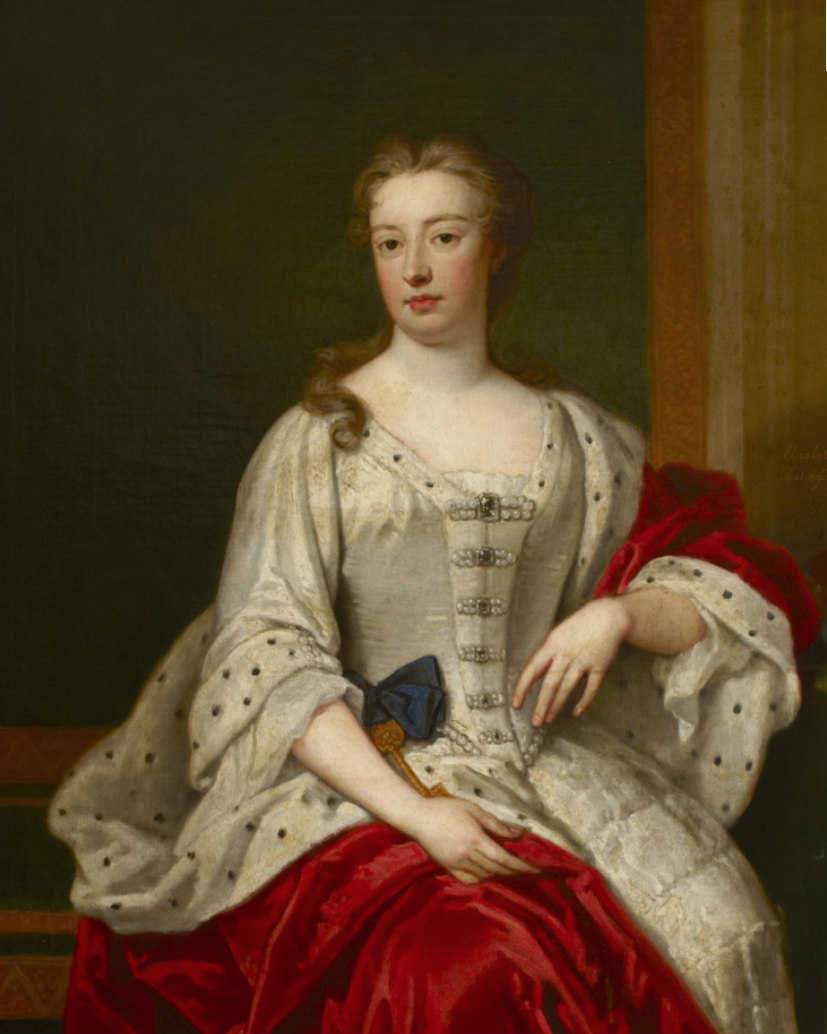
Lady Elizabeth Percy

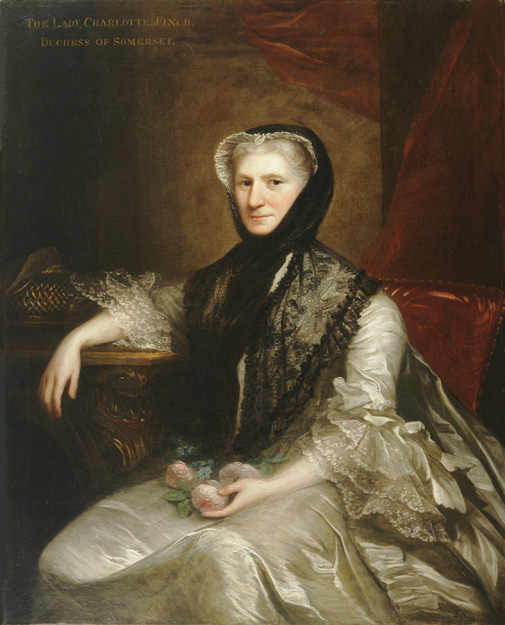
Lady Charlotte Finch, Duchess of Somerset

Somerset married twice. Firstly, in 1682, at the age of twenty, as described above, he married the 15-year-old heiress Lady Elizabeth Percy (1667–1722), already twice widowed. As Duchess of Somerset, she served as Groom of the Stole and First Lady of the Bedchamber at the court of Queen Anne.

Following his wife's death in 1722 the Duke developed a romantic attachment to the widowed Sarah Churchill, Duchess of Marlborough (1660–1744) (née Sarah Jennings) whose husband John Churchill, 1st Duke of Marlborough had died the same year. He sent her "feverish love letters", but she remained loyal to her late husband.

By Lady Elizabeth Percy he had one surviving son and three daughters:

- Charles Seymour, Earl of Hereford (baptized 22 March 1683 – died before 26 August 1683), who died an infant in his first year.
- Algernon Seymour, 7th Duke of Somerset (11 November 1684 – 7 February 1750), eldest surviving son and heir, known during his father's lifetime by the courtesy title of Earl of Hertford, one of his father's subsidiary titles. Algernon's only daughter and sole-heiress Lady Elizabeth Seymour, suo jure Baroness Percy, together with her husband Sir Hugh Smithson, 4th Baronet (died 1786) (who in 1749 adopted the surname Percy and in 1766 was created Duke of Northumberland) inherited half the great Percy estates including Alnwick Castle and Syon House.
- Percy Seymour, died unmarried.
- Lady Elizabeth Seymour (1685 – 2 April 1734), eldest daughter, wife of Henry O'Brien, 8th Earl of Thomond (1688–1741), without progeny. His chosen heir was her younger nephew Percy Wyndham-O'Brien, 1st Earl of Thomond (c. 1713–1774) of Shortgrove, Essex, who adopted the surname O'Brien and was elevated to the peerage as Earl of Thomond.
- Lady Catherine Seymour (1693 – 9 April 1731), 2nd daughter, wife of Sir William Wyndham, 3rd Baronet (c. 1688–1740) of Orchard Wyndham in Somerset. He was a radical Tory and leader of the Jacobite rebellion of 1715 against King George I, but nevertheless remained a firm favourite of his father-in-law the 6th Duke of Somerset, a firm supporter of the Hanoverian Succession and a Whig. Following his arrest in 1715 for high treason and his imprisonment in the Tower of London, the Duke offered to provide bail for his liberty, which was badly received by the King, who shortly afterwards dismissed him as Master of the Horse. Her eldest son was Charles Wyndham, 2nd Earl of Egremont (1710–1763), who inherited half of the great Percy estates including Petworth House, Egremont Castle in Cumberland and Leconfield Castle in Yorkshire.
- Lady Anne Seymour (1709 – 27 November 1722), 3rd daughter, who married (as his second wife) Peregrine Osborne, Marquess of Carmarthen (1691–1731), later 3rd Duke of Leeds, by whom she had a son who died an infant. She died aged 13 without surviving progeny.
- Lady Frances Seymour, died unmarried.

Secondly on 4 February 1725, at the age of 63 he married Lady Charlotte Finch (1693–1773), a daughter of Daniel Finch, 7th Earl of Winchilsea, later 2nd Earl of Nottingham. He treated her poorly and once told her, after she had gently tapped him on the shoulder with her fan: "Madam, my first wife was a Percy and she never took such a liberty". By Charlotte Finch he had two further children:

- Lady Frances Seymour (18 July 1728 – 25 January 1761), wife of John Manners, Marquess of Granby, eldest son of the Duke of Rutland
- Lady Charlotte Seymour (21 September 1730 – 15 February 1805), wife of Heneage Finch, 3rd Earl of Aylesford and had issue.

Somerset's last known letter to Sarah Churchill, Duchess of Marlborough, dated 1737, twelve years after his second marriage, declared his unchanged affections for her. The correspondence is preserved in the British Library.

== Death and burial ==
Somerset died at Petworth on 2 December 1748 and was buried in the Seymour Chapel of Salisbury Cathedral, in Wiltshire, where the elaborate monument to his ancestor Edward Seymour, 1st Earl of Hertford (1539–1621), son of the 1st Duke of Somerset, survives.

== Succession ==
Somerset's son and heir apparent, Algernon Seymour, Earl of Hertford (1684–1749) had in 1725 produced a son of his own, George Seymour, Viscount Beauchamp. However, in 1744 this grandson died unexpectedly without having married, and thus his only grandchild was a daughter and sole heiress, Lady Elizabeth Seymour, who in 1740 had married Sir Hugh Smithson, 4th Baronet. By 1744 Algernon Seymour was aged sixty, and his wife was past child-bearing age. Thus, on the death of his grandson, Somerset foresaw that his own line of the Seymour family was about to die out in the male line. As was said of Edward Howard, 9th Duke of Norfolk, "the honours of his family were about to pass away from his own line to settle on that of a distant relative".

So before the death of the 6th Duke in 1748, it had become apparent that the dukedom of Somerset would ultimately devolve by law onto an extremely distant cousin and heir male, the 6th Duke's 6th cousin Sir Edward Seymour, 6th Baronet (1695–1757) of Berry Pomeroy in Devon and of Maiden Bradley in Wiltshire, who in fact represented the senior line of the Seymour family, being descended from the first marriage of the 1st Duke, which had been excluded from the direct succession to the dukedom and placed in remainder only, due to the suspected adultery of the first duke's first wife. Moreover, the combined estates of the Seymours of Trowbridge and the incomparably greater inherited Percy estates were unentailed and would not devolve the same way, but could be bequeathed as the 6th Duke pleased. However, the sixth Duke "conceived a violent dislike for Smithson", whom he considered insufficiently aristocratic to inherit the ancient estates of the Percy family; his son disagreed, and wanted to include his son-in-law Smithson in the inheritance. The 6th Duke had included King George II in his plan to exclude Smithson from the inheritance, yet the King had received proposals in opposition from his son and Smithson himself.

The 6th Duke died before his plan was put into effect, yet nevertheless the 7th Duke and King George II created an arrangement which did not entirely dismiss his wishes: the Percy estates would be split between Smithson and the 6th Duke's favoured eldest grandson, Sir Charles Wyndham, 4th Baronet (1710–1763). Smithson would receive Alnwick Castle and Syon House, while Wyndham would receive Egremont Castle and the 6th Duke's beloved Petworth. It was deemed appropriate and necessary by all parties concerned, including the King, that heirs to such families and estates as the Percys and Seymours should be elevated to the peerage. This was done in the following manner: Following the 6th Duke's death in 1748, in 1749 King George II created four new titles for the 7th Duke, each with special remainders in anticipation that he would die without having produced a male heir, which in fact occurred the next year in 1750. He was created Baron Warkworth of Warkworth Castle and Earl of Northumberland, both with special remainder to Smithson; and was created at the same time Baron Cockermouth and Earl of Egremont, with special remainder to Wyndham. (It has always been customary on the creation of a greater peerage title to create at the same time a barony, to be used as a courtesy title for the eldest son).

== Arms ==
Arms of Charles Seymour, 6th Duke of Somerset

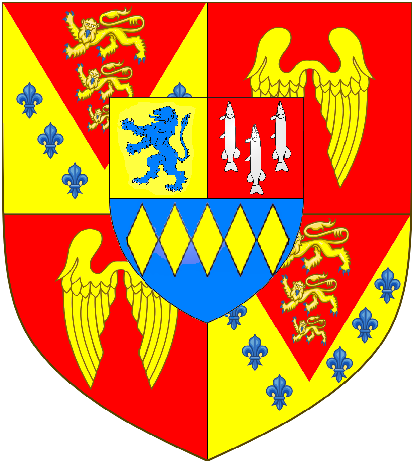
Arms of the 6th Duke of Somerset

The Somerset coat of arms is blazoned Quarterly, 1st and 4th: Or, on a pile gules between six fleurs-de-lys azure three lions of England (a special grant to the first Duke of Somerset); 2nd and 3rd: Gules, two wings conjoined in lure or (Seymour). These arms concede the positions of greatest honour, the 1st & 4th quarters, to a special grant of arms to the first Duke of Somerset (died 1552) by his nephew King Edward VI, incorporating the fleurs-de-lys (with tinctures reversed) of the Royal arms of France, first quartered by King Edward III, and the lions of the royal arms of Plantagenet.

The 6th Duke of Somerset used these arms with an inescutcheon of pretence of the House of Percy, of three quarters: 1st: Or, a lion rampant azure (Percy modern/Brabant); 2nd: Gules, three lucies hauriant argent (de Lucy); 3rd: Azure, five fusils conjoined in fess or (Percy ancient). Marshalling as shown sculpted on the overmantel of the Marble Hall at Petworth House.

== Bibliography ==
- Lodge, Edmund, Portraits of Illustrious Personages of Great Britain, Vol X, London, 1835, pp. 1–7: Charles Seymour, Sixth Duke of Somerset
- St Maur, Harold, Annals of the Seymours, Being a History of the Seymour Family, From Early Times to Within a Few Years of the Present, London, 1902 The author was the illegitimate grandson of the 12th Duke of Somerset, from whom he inherited the estate of Stover, Teigngrace in Devon.

Political offices
Preceded by The Earl of Pembroke and Montgomery	Lord President of the Council; 1702	Succeeded by The Earl of Pembroke and Montgomery
Honorary titles
Preceded by The Earl of Mulgrave	Lord Lieutenant and Custos Rotulorum of the East Riding of Yorkshire; 1682–1687	Succeeded by The Earl of Mulgrave
Preceded by The Earl of Winchilsea	Lord Lieutenant of Somerset; 1683–1687	Succeeded by The Lord Waldegrave
Preceded by The Earl of Carlisle	Senior Privy Counsellor; 1738–1748	Succeeded by The Earl of Dartmouth
Peerage of England
Preceded by Francis Seymour	Duke of Somerset; 1678–1748	Succeeded by Algernon Seymour
