= George Floyd protests in the United Kingdom =

2020 anti-racism protests in the UK

- Part of George Floyd protests
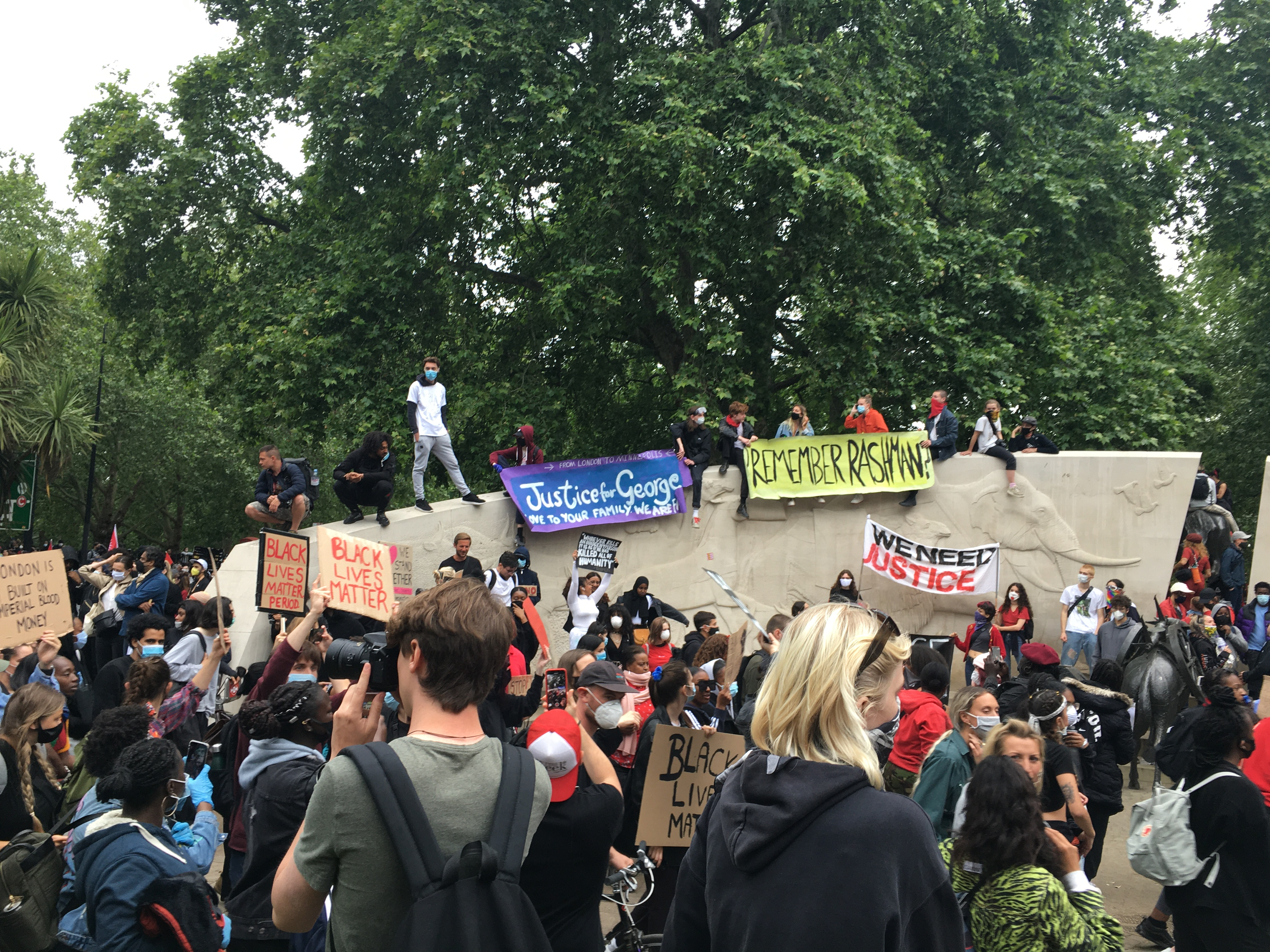
- Protests at Hyde Park, London, 3 June 2020
- Date: 28 May 2020 – 21 June 2020 (3 weeks and 3 days)
- Location: United Kingdom
- Caused by: Reaction to the murder of George Floyd in the United States; Police brutality in the United Kingdom; Racism and police corruption; Solidarity with concurrent protests in the United States
- Goals: Justice for George Floyd; Racial justice and equality; Removal of statues of people linked to the slave trade
- Methods: Protests, demonstrations, civil disobedience, sit-ins, die-ins, internet activism

Parties
Black Lives Matter; Unite Against Fascism; Momentum; Unaffiliated protesters	Law enforcement in the United Kingdom

Casualties
- Injuries: 130+
- Arrested: 135+

Map of protests with 100 or more people attending in Great Britain, Northern Ireland, the Channel Islands, and the Isle of Man.

Protests were held across the United Kingdom following the murder of George Floyd, a 46-year-old African-American man, by a police officer in the United States on 25 May 2020. Immediately following his murder, protests and riots occurred in dozens of cities across the United States. Protests were staged internationally for the first time on 28 May, with a solidarity demonstration outside the United States Embassy in London. They took place during the UK COVID-19 pandemic.

== Overview ==
Large protests were held across the United Kingdom, particularly in Birmingham, Liverpool, London, Manchester, and Newcastle. Many protests were organised by the Black Lives Matter (BLM) and Stand Up to Racism movements. As well as providing solidarity to protests in the United States, many of the ongoing protests in the United Kingdom highlighted issues with racism faced from law enforcement in the United Kingdom and in daily life.

Many protests received endorsement and support from local councils and politicians, including in Liverpool and Oxford. The majority of protests in the United Kingdom were peaceful, although notable clashes between protesters and police occurred on multiple occasions in central London. There were also notable cases of vandalism of historical statues, including graffiti sprayed on the plinth of the statue of Winston Churchill in Parliament Square. In Bristol, protesters toppled a statue of 17th-century slave trader Edward Colston from its pedestal and then pushed it into the harbour on 7 June. Subsequently, the Mayor of London Sadiq Khan established the Commission for Diversity in the Public Realm in order to investigate whether statues on display in London were still suitable for the modern-day. The George Floyd protests in the United Kingdom were the largest outside the United States.

The protests took place at a time in the COVID-19 pandemic during which there were restrictions on public gatherings. As measured by COVID-19 death toll, the United Kingdom was at the time the third-worst affected country globally. During the period of the protests in May and June, public gatherings were legally limited to a maximum of six people, all separated by 2 metres (6.6 ft), although police forces tolerated the majority of protests despite the restrictions outlawing them. Many protests attempted to follow social distancing, and some handed out masks and gloves to attendees, although there were still concerns that the protests could lead to a second wave of COVID-19 cases in the United Kingdom.

== Timeline of protests ==
=== May ===
==== 28 May ====
The first solidarity protests in the United Kingdom occurred in London on 28 May 2020. More than 20 participants gathered outside the US Embassy on Nine Elms Lane in Battersea with Black Lives Matter and Stand Up to Racism banners.

==== 29 May ====
Dozens of people attended a vigil held at the Free Derry Corner in Derry on 29 May. Protesters gathered at the historic site in the Bogside neighbourhood carrying signs, flags and candles. The protest was attended by local Social Democratic and Labour Party councillor Mary Durkan, who described the action as "short, simple and above all else powerful". Graffiti stating "I can't breathe" was added to the existing graffiti wall around the back of Free Derry Corner.

==== 30 May ====
Hundreds of protesters gathered and marched through streets in Peckham in south-east London on 30 May to protest against police brutality.

==== 31 May ====
31 May marked the first day of large and widespread protests across the United Kingdom.

In Belfast, over 100 people gathered for a solidarity vigil organised by the Connolly Youth Movement held at Writers' Square.

Hundreds of protesters gathered peacefully outside Cardiff Castle in Cardiff. Local figures gave speeches to the assembled crowd, who attempted to maintain social distancing.

In Liverpool, hundreds of people gathered outside St George's Hall. Protesters listened to speeches by the leaders of the rally before kneeling for 8 minutes and 46 seconds, the length of time taken to kill George Floyd.

In London, thousands of people protested in Trafalgar Square and outside the United States Embassy. The Metropolitan Police had a special policing plan in place for the protest due to the COVID-19 pandemic, and arrested five people outside the embassy: three for violating COVID-19 restrictions and two for assaulting a police officer. During the march from Trafalgar Square to the embassy, four young black men outside Battersea Park railway station climbed on top of a bus stop, took the knee, and raised a fist, which the crowd subsequently copied.

In Manchester, hundreds of protesters marched through the city centre to St Ann's Square, where a rally was held. Protesters were additionally influenced by an incident between Greater Manchester Police officers and Desmond Mombeyarara on 9 May, in which Mombeyarara was tasered by police in front of his young child; footage of the incident at a Stretford petrol station subsequently went viral.

In Swansea, a socially distanced Black Lives Matter protest organised by "Stand Up To Racism Swansea" on Museum Green.

=== June ===
==== 1 June ====
In Belfast, around 100 people attended a protest at Belfast City Hall. Multiple rallies were held in the city centre, calling for the state of Minnesota to "raise the degree", i.e. raise officer Derek Chauvin's murder charge from third-degree to second-degree. The main protest rally was officially rescheduled to 3 June by the organisers due to concerns about a lack of black representation amongst protest leaders, although many people proceeded to gather at the assigned place and time on 1 June anyway.

==== 2 June ====
Hundreds of people gathered in The Square, Lower Gardens and outside of the town hall in Bournemouth. The protests remained peaceful, with Dorset Police confirming that no arrests were made. Protest organiser William Wren stated that "the issues in Britain are different but our society has a structure very similar to the US", and that British people "have a responsibility" to show solidarity with protests in America. As well as George Floyd, protesters paid respect to Ahmaud Arbery and other high-profile recent black American killings.

In Coventry, around 300 people attended a protest rally starting at the city's central police station before marching back into the city centre. West Midlands Police confirmed that they would work with organisers to ensure the protests in the area remained safe and peaceful. Concurrent smaller protests took place across the West Midlands.

Liverpool City Council lit up all of the city's buildings in purple during the evening of 2 June to show solidarity with the protest movement and in honour of Floyd. Mayor of Liverpool Joe Anderson tweeted that "our city has always stood up for justice" and that "Liverpool will stand with you [the protesters] and Minneapolis".

Similarly, Leeds City Council and Wakefield Council lit up their civic buildings in purple.

==== 3 June ====
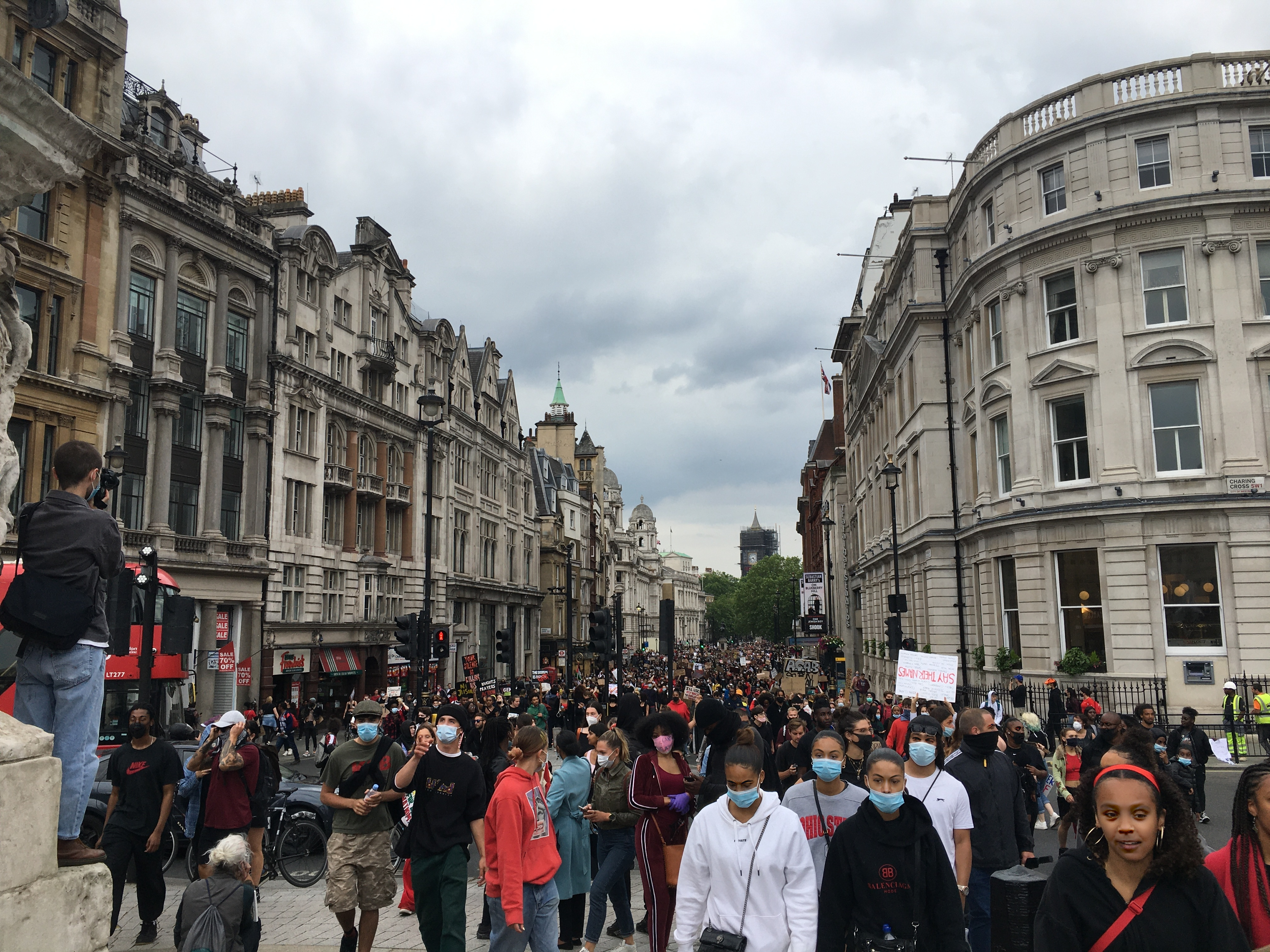
Protesters at Trafalgar Square, London on 3 June

A large demonstration took place in Hyde Park in central London, attended by hundreds of people. Aerial photos of the protest showed that the participants were largely adhering to social distancing rules, and the Metropolitan Police allowed the protest to progress without incident. Actor John Boyega attended the protest and gave a notable speech, calling out police in the United States over the murder of George Floyd, and the deaths of Trayvon Martin, Sandra Bland and others, as well as police in the United Kingdom over their handling of the Stephen Lawrence case in 1993. Demonstrators subsequently left the park and blocked traffic on Park Lane around 15:00, stopping at least ten double-decker buses before being moved along. A stencil drawing of George Floyd's face appeared on a plinth at Speakers' Corner.

Clashes erupted later in the evening as part of the protest group advanced further into central London on their way to Parliament Square. Protesters climbed onto windowsills on the walls of the HM Treasury building, spraying Black Lives Matter graffiti on the Treasury and surrounding buildings. At least 13 people were arrested after violent clashes broke out outside the gates to Downing Street, where tensions boiled over as the crowd had gathered to chant at Prime Minister Boris Johnson. Signs, temporary fencing, and bottles were thrown over the gates, and groups of protesters attempted to breach them. The Downing Street gates are ordinarily guarded by armed police, although these officers did not take part in the clashes. Further violence erupted after police officers were seen throwing a black protester against a metal railing while attempting to make an arrest.

In Brighton, more than 1,000 demonstrators took part in a protest march through the city centre. Protesters gathered in the churchyard of St Nicholas Church before marching to the main central police station in Brighton. Protesters were demanding justice for George Floyd and chanted that the British law enforcement system was also systematically racist. Police subsequently moved the protest along from the police station to The Level, where demonstrators gathered in a circle and gave impromptu speeches about their own experiences of racism. Sussex Police confirmed that one arrest had been made at the protest, and warned that large gatherings were still illegal under COVID-19 restrictions and that future protests would be dispersed.

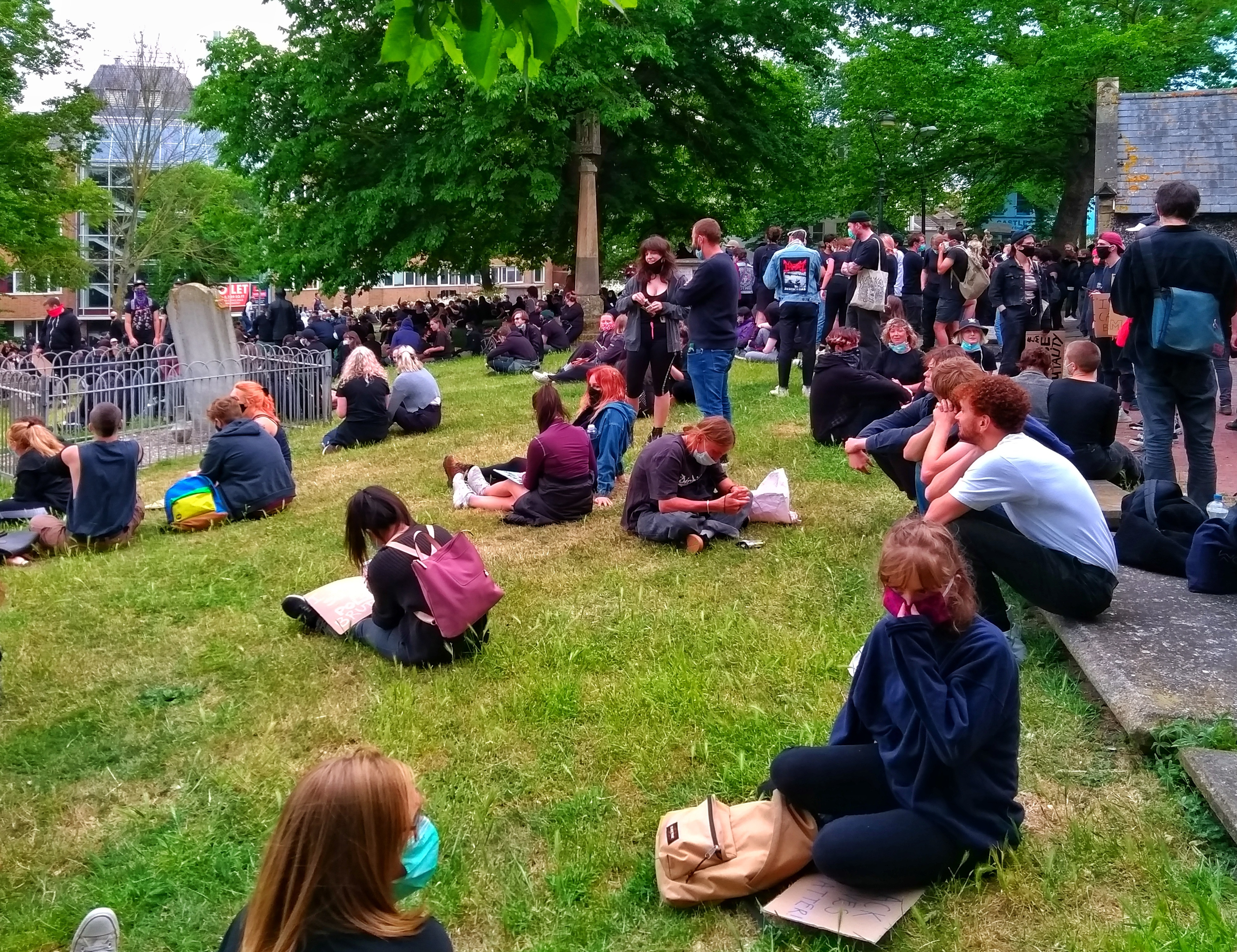
Protest in Brighton on 3 June

Along the coast in Southampton, approximately 500 demonstrators gathered at the city's Guildhall; many wore gloves and masks to protect themselves from COVID-19, however, social distancing was observed to falter as the protest went on. Protesters called for justice for Belly Mujinga, a railway ticket office worker at London Victoria station, who died from COVID-19 on 5 April 2020 several days after being racially attacked by a man who falsely claimed to have tested positive for the virus; police at the time stated that they would not be investigating Mujinga's death. In solidarity with the protests, Southampton City Council lit up city buildings in purple.

Hundreds of people gathered in South Park in Oxford for a protest which was backed by Layla Moran, Liberal Democrat Member of Parliament for the Oxford West and Abingdon constituency, despite her being unable to attend the protest in person. The protest was relocated from Bonn Square to South Park in order to encourage social distancing, due to a higher than expected turnout. Oxford City Council leader Susan Brown confirmed that the council stood in solidarity with the protest.

In Edinburgh, around 50–60 people gathered briefly in Parliament Square and outside St Giles' Cathedral to protest, with many taking a knee for George Floyd. Social distancing measures were observed and most people wore masks due to the ongoing COVID-19 pandemic. The event was organised by Stand Up to Racism.

Protests were held in York, Leeds and Sheffield. A socially distanced vigil for George Floyd was held outside York Minster by York Stand Up To Racism.

==== 4 June ====
Around 4,000 people took part in a protest march in central Birmingham. Protesters gathered in Centenary Square outside the Library of Birmingham around 16:00 and subsequently marched to the front of the West Midlands Police headquarters, Lloyd House. The protest was originally organised for Victoria Square, but was relocated due to the high turnout in order to allow for social distancing to be observed. The crowds were reported to have remained peaceful, and no arrests were made. The Birmingham protest was organised by the UK Isn't Innocent group, aimed at exposing racism and police brutality in the United Kingdom as well as the United States. Footballer Tyrone Mings, who plays for the local team Aston Villa, joined the protest march; he was the victim of high-profile racial abuse while playing for the England national team in Bulgaria in 2019.

More than 500 people attended a protest in Royal Leamington Spa. The protest march proceeded peacefully from the Royal Pump Room Gardens down the Parade. Around 500 people attended a peaceful protest in the centre of Lincoln, marching from the High Street, up Steep Hill and ending in front of Lincoln Cathedral. Once there, the crowd gathered to listen to speeches from members of the black Lincoln community, and took a knee in solidarity for 8 minutes and 46 seconds. Water and masks were handed out by the protest organisers.

Approximately 300 people gathered for a demonstration in Barnstaple, organised by three local black/mixed girls who claimed that racism was "more prevalent" in rural areas like Devon compared to major cities. Protest organisers marked crosses onto the ground in Barnstaple Square with chalk in order to facilitate social distancing. Towards the end of the protest, demonstrators staged a die-in in the square. Hundreds of people peacefully protested in Queen Victoria Square in the centre of Kingston upon Hull, where protest organisers also marked the ground with chalk to aid social distancing. Protesters in Hull took a knee in honour of Floyd and other victims of racism in the United States.

Hundreds of people gathered in Guildhall Square in Portsmouth for a Black Lives Matter demonstration, where protesters criticised the local Hampshire Constabulary for their previous track record on racism. In New Alresford, near Winchester, around 100 people gathered on Broad Street for another Black Lives Matter protest, holding placards and taking a knee. Around 20 demonstrators gathered outside of the Willis Museum in Basingstoke for a solidarity protest. In Newport on the Isle of Wight, a large group of protesters gathered to protest against racism in the United Kingdom, kneeling for nine minutes in honour of George Floyd.

In Staines-upon-Thames, a gathering of over 100 demonstrators convened outside Spelthorne Borough Council offices to show solidarity with local black communities.

==== 5 June ====
A protest took place in Eastrop Park in Basingstoke on 5 June, which was attended by hundreds of people.

In Scotland, a petition to rename Glasgow streets named after Tobacco Lords who owned slave plantations in America and Jamaica received almost 8000 signatures.

==== 6 June ====
The protest in central London was the largest of the week. One of the Black Lives Matter organisers had told The Guardian that they had expected about 20,000, but it seemed several times that had turned up. Protests outside Downing Street started peacefully but later turned violent after a group started throwing bottles. 14 police officers were injured during the clashes, and 14 protesters were arrested. The initials "BLM" were daubed in black paint on The Cenotaph war memorial. Graffiti was sprayed on a number of Whitehall buildings, including that of the Cabinet Office.

A protest in Manchester was joined by about 15,000 people. Over 1,000 people attended a protest organised by Black Lives Matter at Devonshire Green in Sheffield city centre. The protest was endorsed by local political groups including the Heeley Labour Party and the leader of Sheffield City Council, Julie Dore. The Sheffield protest was livestreamed on social media for people who were unable to attend due to COVID-19 restrictions, as Sheffield was the worst affected British city by the pandemic outside London.

An estimated 1,200 attended a Black Lives Matter protest in Bath, a city with a population of about 90,000. The organisers were not expecting so many to attend. The protest was peaceful throughout with free masks being handed out on arrival, with social distancing measures being followed. In Guildford, a town in South East England with a population of about 80,000, hundreds of people attended a march through the town centre. According to the Leicester Black Lives Matter Instagram account, over 4000 people turned up to a protest in the city. The demonstration remained peaceful, with minimal police presence, and social distancing was enforced by the organisers throughout the event. The city's Mayor and police force spoke in support of the event. Additional protests occurred in Kingston upon Thames, Luton, Salisbury, Watford, Aylesbury, Exeter, Swindon, Worthing, Royal Tunbridge Wells, Peterborough, Ipswich, Southend-on-Sea, Roundwood Park in Wembley, Newington Green, Stevenage, Cambridge, and Chatham, Kent.

A protest also took place in Milton Keynes, where a demonstration began at Milton Keynes central railway station at noon before marching to the Milton Keynes Council offices (which had been lit purple during previous nights in a show of solidarity) and then to the Thames Valley Police Station in Milton Keynes, where several police officers took a knee. Around 2,000 protesters gathered in Bute Park in Cardiff. Protesters took a knee during an hour-long demonstration outside the war memorial in Bangor, Gwynedd, organised by the North Wales African Society.

In Glasgow, anti-racism campaigners have symbolically renamed streets long named after slave traders and Tobacco Lords by affixing their own signs under the original street signs.

- Glassford Street was changed to Fred Hampton Street
- Wilson Street was changed to Rosa Parks Street.
- Cochrane Street was changed to Sheku Bayoh Street, named after a black man who was killed by police in Kirkcaldy.
- Ingram Street was renamed Harriet Tubman Street
- Buchanan Street was renamed George Floyd Street

In Northern Ireland, protests of varying sizes occurred in Belfast (less than 500), Derry (around 1000), and Newry (a small crowd that dispersed quickly). The Police Service of Northern Ireland issued a large number of citations for social distancing violations.

In Newcastle-upon-Tyne, an estimated 3,000 people gathered under Grey's Monument in support of the Black Lives Matter movement with a further 2,800 people tuned into an online protest with speeches from the likes of Newcastle Central MP, Chi Onwurah and Shumel Rahman. Protesters marched from the monument, down Grainger Street, past Newcastle Central Station and finished in Newcastle's Centre for Life and marched back up to Grey's Monument via Clayton Street after listening to community leaders speak on racism in the United Kingdom and a moments silence for George Floyd. On the same day, an opposing protest organised by the English Defence League was on Newcastle's streets.

Crowds gathered in the Welsh cities of Denbigh, Bangor, Swansea, Caerphilly and Cardiff. Hundreds marched from Bute Park to Senedd Cymru (Welsh Parliament) in Cardiff Bay.

==== 7 June ====
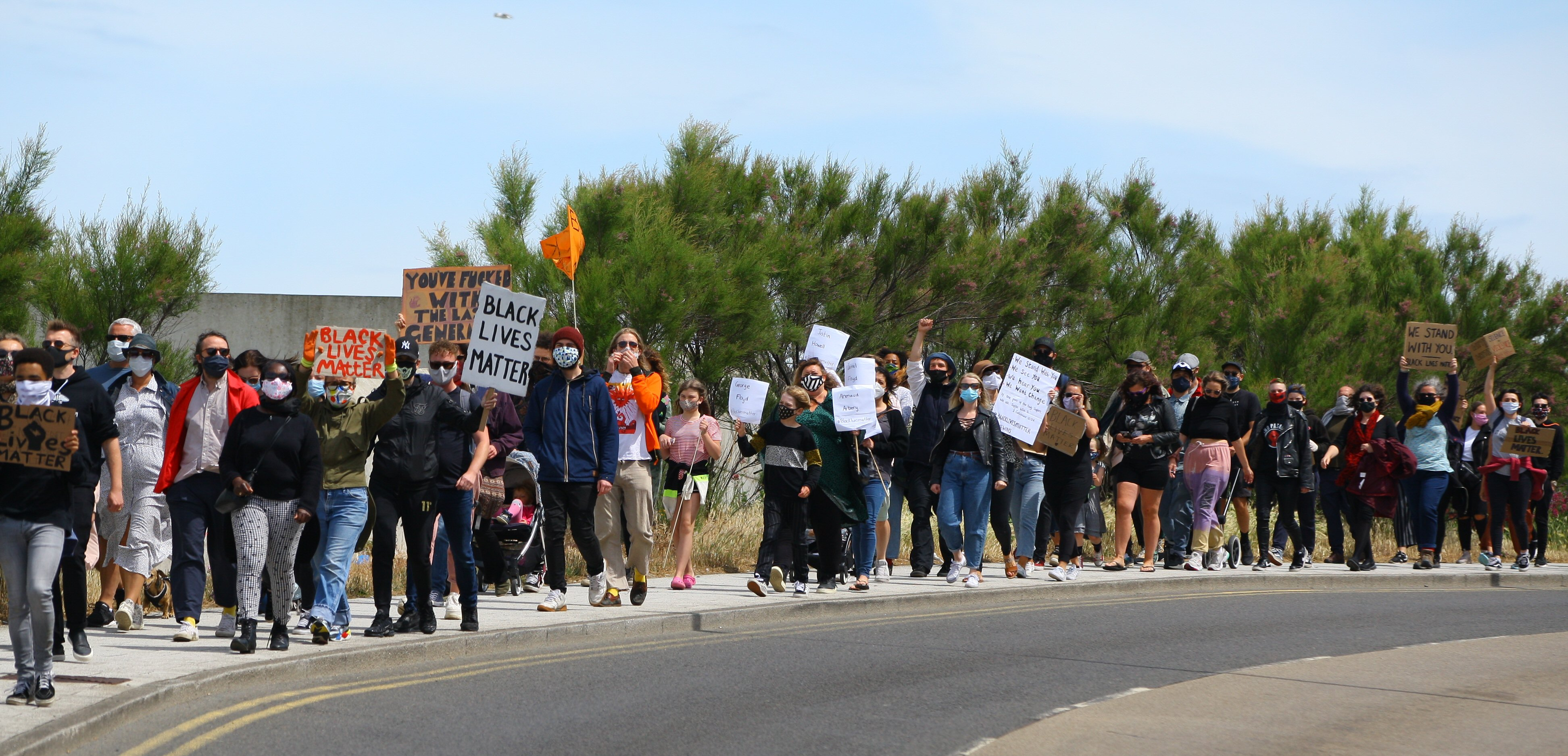
Protest in Margate, 7 June

Tens of thousands of people protested across the UK, in cities and towns that included Bognor Regis, Bury St Edmunds, Cardiff, Carlisle, Chester, Coventry, Dumfries, Glasgow, Hastings, Liverpool, London, Lytham St Annes, Manchester, Merthyr Tydfil, Middlesbrough, Newcastle, Nottingham, Oxford, Sheffield, Weymouth, Woking, Wolverhampton, Wrexham, and Yeovil.

In London, BLM protesters clashed with police. A protester was seen climbing onto The Cenotaph war memorial and attempted to set the Union Jack on fire. The words "was a racist" were painted onto a statue of Sir Winston Churchill. The Metropolitan Police said that a further 12 were arrested in central London for public order offences. As a response to these events, right-wing activist and convicted criminal Tommy Robinson announced a counter-protest for 13 June to protect both the Churchill statue and the Cenotaph from further vandalism. Multiple copycat protests also sprung up around the UK, many by veterans, to stop the vandalism of war memorials.

A statue of the 17th-century slave trader Edward Colston was toppled and defaced in Bristol. One protester placed his knee on the statue's neck, recalling Floyd's murder by asphyxiation by a white policeman. A crowd of at least 5,000 people marched from Bristol's College Green to The Centre where they tore down the statue, dragged and dumped it into Bristol Harbour. The empty plinth was used as a stage for protesters. In the subsequent criminal proceedings four people were charged with criminal damage but acquitted by a jury after a trial in January 2022.

Other protests:

- Hundreds of protesters social distanced while protesting against racial injustice in Holyrood Park in Edinburgh.
- Hundreds of protesters gathered at Glasgow Green in Glasgow.
- Hundreds of protesters gathered in Dundee City Centre in Dundee, despite the protest being previously cancelled due to concerns over COVID-19. Around 200 protesters turned up after the Young Socialists campaign group spearheaded the previously cancelled protest.
- A peaceful protest took place in Derby City Centre with more than one thousand in attendance.
- The city of Norwich held a peaceful protest outside The Forum with several hundred protesters in attendance. The event was also live streamed via Facebook Live.
- Around 1000 people showed their solidarity with all the other rallies for George Floyd with a march in Plymouth City Centre from Jigsaw Park to Charles Cross Police Station.
- In Colchester, a peaceful protest took place in Castle park with over 1000 protesters in attendance.
- In Coventry, hundreds of people assembled in Broadgate for the city's second George Floyd protest.

==== 8 June ====
Protests continued in various locations, including several hundred people in Cheltenham and Bedford.

==== 9 June ====
A crowd of protesters in Oxford gathered outside Oriel College, demanding that the statue of Cecil Rhodes be removed. Protesters fell silent for 8 minutes and 46 seconds in the memory of George Floyd. Protests continued elsewhere in the country, including in Barking, London.

Hundreds took part in Black Lives Matter protests in Douglas, Isle of Man and in Henley-on-Thames.

==== 10 June ====
In Jersey, more than a thousand people attended a George Floyd protest in People's Park. That night a statue of Sir George Carteret was defaced with paint in solidarity with the recent events in Bristol due to Carteret's involvement as a slave trader for the Royal African Company.

In Newport, Wales, more than 1,000 demonstrators marched from the city's civic centre to the University of South Wales in support of the Black Lives Matter movement.

==== 12 June ====
Around 1,000 people gathered in St Albans where a local resident claimed the city had 'never seen anything like this'. In Stratford-upon-Avon, an estimated 600 people attended a protest.

==== 13 June ====
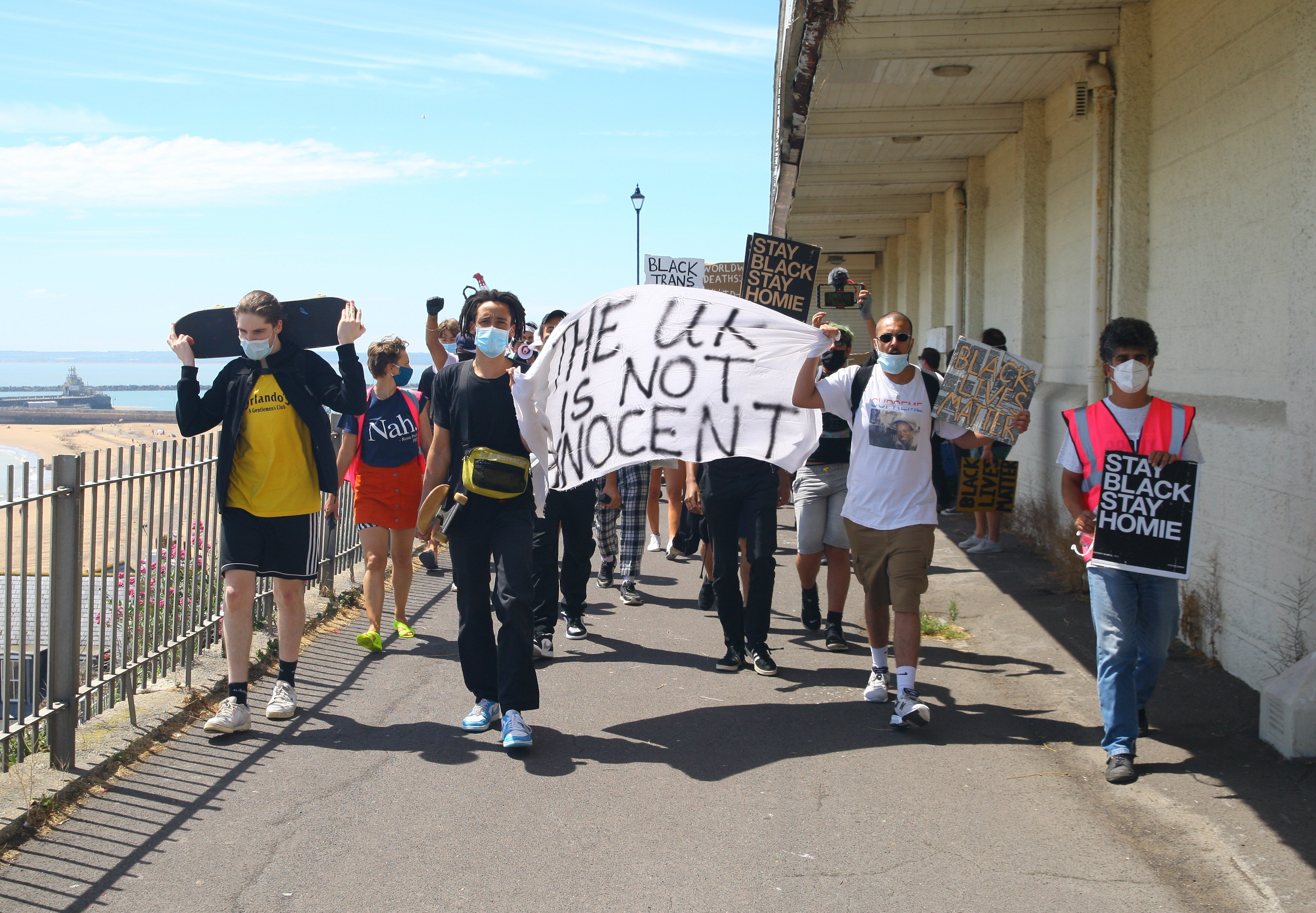
Protest in Ramsgate, 13 June

An official Black Lives Matter protest was cancelled in London due to concerns that it could be countered by far-right groups after right-wing activist movement the Democratic Football Lads Alliance had called for people to travel to London to protect monuments. Hundreds of counter-protesters – including members of far-right groups – gathered at several statue sites in London, and violently clashed with the police, leading to over a hundred arrests and six injured police officers. Prior to this, the statue of Winston Churchill in Parliament Square was completely covered by the government in order to protect it from being defaced, and several other memorials partially covered.

During the afternoon, a protest took place in Brighton. In Newcastle, counter-protesters hurled smoke bombs, bottles, flares and fireworks at Black Lives Matter protesters and Northumbria Police officers resulting in 13 arrests and 5 Black Lives Matter protesters being hospitalised. Hundreds of people participated in a protest march in Aberdeen. In Chelmsford, hundreds of people attended a protest in the city's Central Park. Protests also occurred in Canterbury, Chichester, Slough, Gloucester, Harrow, London, Northampton, King's Lynn, Marlow, Buckinghamshire, Bishop's Stortford, and Croydon.

In Shetland, "several hundred people" took part in a socially-distanced protest in many locations in the islands. Posters were widely distributed for the protest featuring the slogan "Shetland staands wi [Shetland dialect: stands with] Black Lives Matter".

In Swansea, several dozen protesters took part in a peaceful demonstration at Swansea Memorial Park.

==== 14 June ====
A peaceful protest took place at Leeds' Millennium Square organised by Black Voices Matter, a group including Black Lives Matter Leeds and other black-led organisations from the city. A group of veterans, alongside some football supporters groups potentially linked with far-right politics, gathered in Victoria Gardens to protect the war memorial; beer was thrown at a journalist.

Piers Corbyn, the brother of former Labour Party leader Jeremy Corbyn, joined Black Lives Matter protesters in London, where he incited a crowd on Westminster Bridge to deliver a "summer of discontent" and unite against the BBC, Boris Johnson and Sadiq Khan. A protest additionally took place in Abingdon-on-Thames.

==== 15 June ====
Hundreds assembled in Truro, where there was a small clash with a group of counter-protesters who claimed they were there to protect a memorial.

==== 18 June ====
Foreign Secretary Dominic Raab is criticised for saying during a radio interview that taking the knee is a "symbol of subjugation and subordination" apparently taken from the TV series Game of Thrones.

==== 20 June ====
Protests took place in Ashby-de-la-Zouch, Chippenham Coventry, Glasgow, London, Lydney, Newcastle and Reading.

==== 21 June ====
A second peaceful protest took place on Leeds' Woodhouse Moor, organised by Black Lives Matter Leeds, calling for an end to systemic racism.

== Impact and effects ==
=== Actions against memorials ===
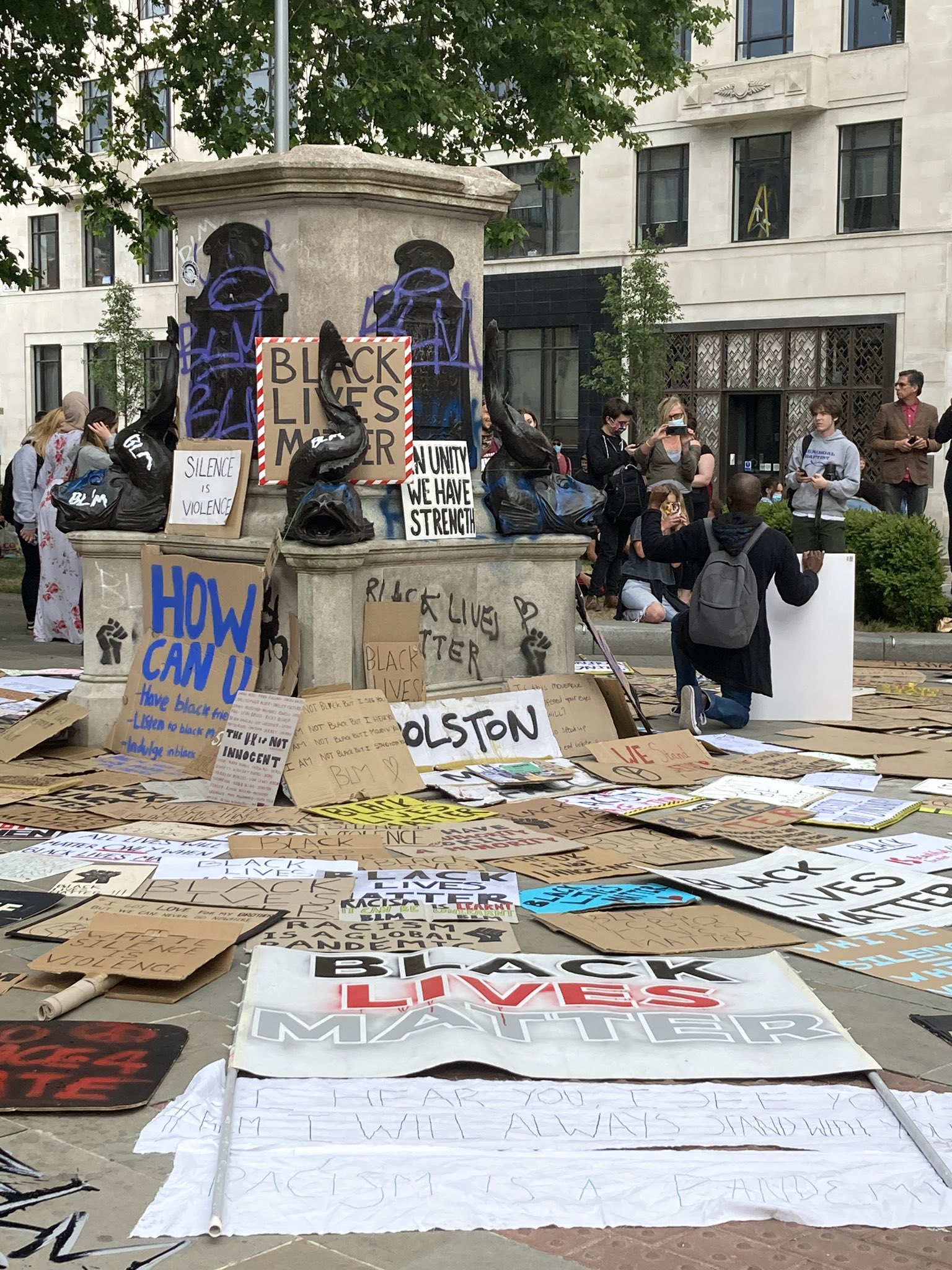
The empty pedestal of the statue of Edward Colston in Bristol, showing placards and graffiti

Protesters defaced the statue of Winston Churchill in London's Parliament Square and Queen Victoria's statue in Leeds. Graffiti on the plinth of Churchill's statue referred to him as "racist", alluding to his controversial racial views. BLM activists in London demanded the removal of 60 statues of historical figures like Prime Ministers Charles Grey and William Gladstone, Vice-Admiral Horatio Nelson, Sir Francis Drake, King Charles II of England, Oliver Cromwell, Cecil Rhodes and Christopher Columbus.

On 5 June, a group of protesters sprayed the abbreviation "ACAB", meaning All Cops Are Bastards, on the memorial to Earl Haig in Whitehall, London; when soldiers from the Household Cavalry in plain clothes scrubbed the graffiti off, protesters shouted abuse at them for doing so.

The statue of Edward Colston in The Centre, Bristol was toppled and thrown into Bristol Harbour on 7 June. On the same day, a protester climbed onto The Cenotaph in London and unsuccessfully attempted to set fire to the Union Flag.

On 7 June, the statue of Mahatma Gandhi in London was sprayed by Black Lives Matter protesters with the word "Racist".

=== Renaming of places ===
Some local councils in England decided to rename public streets or places in response to the movement. Watford Borough Council announced a review into its town street names in July 2020.

The Colston Hall concert hall in Bristol was officially renamed Bristol Beacon in September 2020. The hall was originally named after a 17th-century slave trader, Edward Colston.

Since December 2020, Havelock Road, Southall has been renamed Guru Nanak Road. It was named after colonial general Sir Henry Havelock who was known for his involvement in the Afghan–Sikh Wars and the Indian Rebellion of 1857. The local MP, Virendra Sharma, had been campaigning since 1992 for a name change and said Havelock was a "colonial oppressor, he ravaged India and her people for personal gain and imperial glory".

== Reaction ==
=== Political response ===
Opposition parties in the House of Commons, including Labour and the Scottish National Party, called on Prime Minister Boris Johnson to suspend the export of riot shields, tear gas and other equipment to the United States on 2 June. An open letter was sent to the Prime Minister by Labour MP Emily Thornberry, the Shadow Secretary of State for International Trade, calling the continued supply of riot control equipment to US law enforcement a "disgrace". Johnson responded stating that he would look into any concerns but insisted that exports are subject to "consolidated guidance" to ensure they were not misused, and that the UK is the most "scrupulous country in the world in that regard". The letter was signed by 166 MPs from across all parties in the Commons by 5 June. A petition calling for the suspension of export of riot control equipment has gained more than 500,000 signatures as of 6 June.

At the daily Downing Street COVID-19 press conference on 3 June, Boris Johnson stated that he was "appalled and sickened" by the murder of George Floyd. Johnson said that people had the democratic right to protest, but he "urge[d] people to protest peacefully, and in accordance with the rules on social distancing" before concluding that racism "has no place" in society.

On 8 June, Prime Minister Boris Johnson issued a statement to The Voice in which he stated "I will not support or indulge those who break the law, or attack the police, or desecrate public monuments. We have a democracy in this country. If you want to change the urban landscape, you can stand for election, or vote for someone who will." Johnson said that demonstrations were "subverted by thuggery". Statements also came from several cabinet members, including Priti Patel, who claimed that "lawless minority of protesters" had "regrettably turned to violence".

On 9 June, Mayor of London Sadiq Khan said that he believed statues and plaques in London with links to slavery "should be taken down", and established the Commission for Diversity in the Public Realm to do so. The statue of Robert Milligan, who was largely responsible for the construction of the West India Docks, was removed on the same day that Khan announced the commission.

The petition entitled “Remove the Gandhi Statue in Leicester’ alleges Mahatma Gandhi, the leader of India's independence movement against the British rule, was a racist and sexual predator. British Labour Party politician Keith Vaz said that "dreadful" petition "seeks to divide communities in Leicester and in the country. If this is not withdrawn I will certainly refer it to the police to consider whether it incites racial hatred".

=== Police reaction ===
In reaction to the protests, the chief constables of multiple police forces across the United Kingdom released the following joint statement on 3 June:

In the UK we have a long established tradition of policing by consent, working in communities to prevent crime and solve problems. Officers are trained to use force proportionately, lawfully and only when absolutely necessary. We strive to continuously learn and improve. We will tackle bias, racism or discrimination wherever we find it. Policing is complex and challenging and sometimes we fall short. When we do, we are not afraid to shine a light on injustices or to be held to account. We know people want to make their voices heard. The right to lawful protest is a key part of any democracy, which UK police uphold and facilitate. But coronavirus remains a deadly disease and there are still restrictions in place to prevent its spread, which includes not gathering outside in groups of more than six people. So for whatever reason people want to come together, we ask that people continue to work with officers at this challenging time.

Avon and Somerset Police allowed the Statue of Edward Colston to be toppled on 7 June, a decision which caused public backlash. They later justified this, stating that they had made a "tactical decision" not to intervene, citing concerns that intervention could have led to further violence. However, in the subsequent criminal proceedings four people were charged with criminal damage but acquitted by a jury after a trial.

=== Concerns regarding COVID-19 ===
There were widespread concerns that the protests across the country could lead to a second wave of COVID-19 cases, just as the United Kingdom was beginning to ease lockdown restrictions, despite calls from protest organisers for attendees to maintain social distancing and wear masks and gloves to protests. Some protests were able to maintain adequate social distancing, although aerial photography of larger gatherings showed that social distancing often broke down as protests progressed.

Government and police officials across the devolved nations urged the public to avoid protests due to COVID-19 concerns. On 5 June, the Deputy Assistant Commissioner of the Metropolitan Police, Laurence Taylor, described protests across the United Kingdom as "unlawful" due to health protection regulations. During the daily Downing Street COVID-19 press conference on the same day, the Secretary of State for Health and Social Care, Matt Hancock, said that he was "appalled" by the murder of George Floyd but urged people not to attend planned protests over the following weekend. However, his comments were largely ignored by the public as protests went ahead as planned.

Scottish Cabinet Secretary for Justice Humza Yousaf said: "And we do know there is a lot of evidence of the disproportionate impact that COVID-19 can have on the minority ethnic community. So the very people whose lives we say matter are the very lives that those people could be putting at risk. So yes, it does give me a great deal of concern."

== See also ==
- List of George Floyd protests in the United States
- List of George Floyd protests outside the United States
