= Baron Carteret =

Title in peerage of Great Britain

Arms of Carteret: Gules, four fusils in fess argent

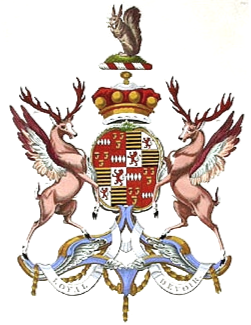
Quartered arms of Baron Carteret (second creation 1784): 1st & 4th grand quarters: 1st & 4th Carteret; 2nd & 3rd: Granville; 2nd & 3rd grand quarters: 1st & 4th: Botteville; 2nd & 3rd: Thynne

Baron Carteret is a title that has been created twice in British history, once in the Peerage of England and once in the Peerage of Great Britain. The first creation came into the Peerage of England in 1681 when the fourteen-year-old Sir George Carteret, 2nd Baronet, was made Baron Carteret, of Hawnes in the County of Bedford (now Haynes Park). The peerage was originally proposed for his grandfather Sir George Carteret, 1st Baronet, a celebrated royalist statesman, but he died before he was granted the title and as his eldest son, Philip, predeceased him, it was eventually bestowed on his grandson, George, with remainder to the latter's brothers. The Baronetcy, of Metesches in the Island of Jersey, had been created for George Carteret in the Baronetage of England on 9 May 1645. Lord Carteret married Lady Grace Granville, daughter of John Granville, 1st Earl of Bath. In 1715 Lady Grace was raised to the Peerage of Great Britain in her own right as Viscountess Carteret and Countess Granville (see Earl Granville for more details on these two peerages). Lord Carteret and Lady Granville were both succeeded by their son John Carteret, the second Baron and second Earl. The titles became extinct on the death of the latter's son Robert Carteret, the third Earl, in 1776.

However, the late Earl Granville bequeathed his lands to his nephew the Honourable Henry Thynne. he was the second son of Lady Louisa Carteret by her husband Thomas Thynne, 2nd Viscount Weymouth. He was the younger brother of Thomas Thynne, 1st Marquess of Bath. Under the terms of the legacy, Henry Thynne assumed the surname and arms of Carteret instead of his patronymic and in 1784 was raised to the Peerage of Great Britain as Baron Carteret, of Hawnes in the County of Bedford, with the remainder to the younger sons of his brother, the Marquess of Bath. He was succeeded according to the special remainder by his nephew George Thynne, the second Baron. He notably served as Comptroller of the Household between 1804 and 1812. He was childless and was succeeded by his younger brother John Thynne, the third Baron (who like his elder brother the second Baron had retained the original family surname of Thynne). He held political office as Vice-Chamberlain of the Household between 1804 and 1812. He also had no children and the title became extinct on his death in 1849.

== Carteret Baronets, of Metesches (1645) ==
- Sir George Carteret, 1st Baronet (c. 1610–1680)
- Sir George Carteret, 2nd Baronet (1669–1695) (created Baron Carteret in 1681)

== Barons Carteret; First creation (1681) ==
- George Carteret, 1st Baron Carteret (1669–1695)
- John Carteret, 2nd Earl Granville, 2nd Baron Carteret (1690–1763)
- Robert Carteret, 3rd Earl Granville, 3rd Baron Carteret (1721–1776)

== Barons Carteret; Second creation (1784) ==
- Henry Carteret, 1st Baron Carteret (1735–1826)
- George Thynne, 2nd Baron Carteret (1770–1838)
- John Thynne, 3rd Baron Carteret (1772–1849)

== See also ==
- Earl Granville
- Marquess of Bath
- Carteret, New Jersey
- Carteret (name)
