= The Wake (sculpture) =

Planned sculpture in London, England

Coordinates: 51.5062°N 0.022°W

The Wake is a planned sculpture by Khaleb Brooks that will be a memorial to the victims of the Atlantic slave trade. It will be sited on West India Quay in East London and is set to be unveiled in 2027.

Brooks's design was chosen from a shortlist of six by a panel of judges. They said that "When we talk about the transatlantic slave trade we're speaking to people’s history and not just black people’s histories ... It's everyone's history on this land, no matter what our involvement was". The Mayor of London, Sadiq Khan, said the sculpture was a "stark reminder of the pain and suffering caused by transatlantic slavery and the role the UK and London played" and that it was " ... essential that London’s streets, statues and memorials reflect our shared history, and this memorial will help to remind and educate Londoners of the capital’s role in this terrible treatment of human beings". The memorial was announced on the Unesco International Day for the Remembrance of the Slave Trade and its Abolition on 23 August 2024.

== Description ==
The Wake will take the form of a cowrie shell and be 7 meters in height. It will be cast in bronze. The interior of the shell will list the names of enslaved people and have wind chimes to create a soundscape.

A cowrie shell was chosen by Brooks after he learnt of the use of the shells as currency in transactions involving enslaved people during the slave trade.

== Location ==
The Wake will stand on West India Quay in the Docklands area of East London. The quay was the site of the importation of commodities that were produced by enslaved people. The statue of Robert Milligan which was removed during the George Floyd protests formerly stood nearby.

== See also ==
- Commission for Diversity in the Public Realm
