= Statue of Robert Milligan =

Sculpture by Richard Westmacott

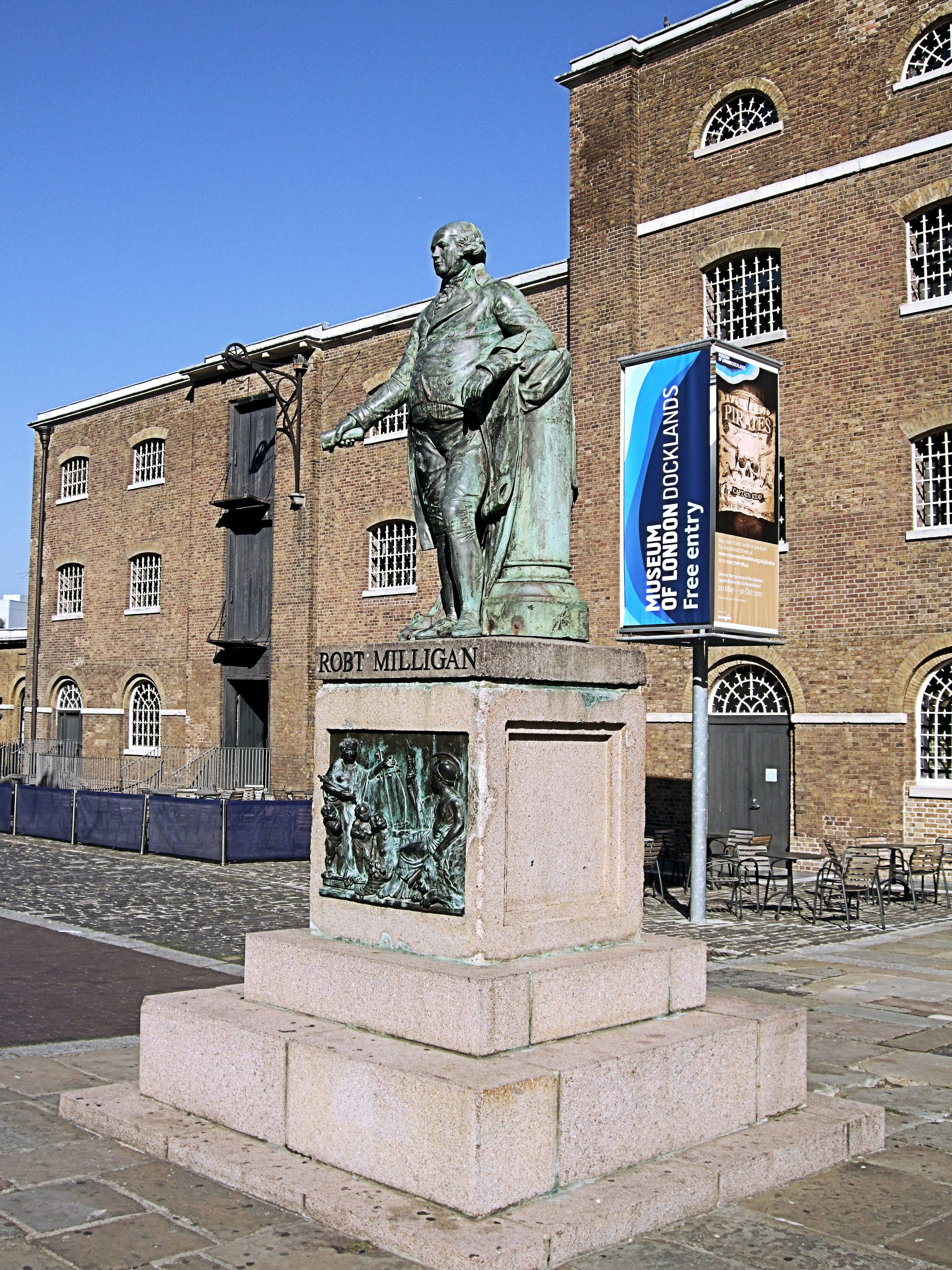
- The statue in 2017
- Artist: Richard Westmacott
- Location: London, England; 51.50735°N 0.02389°W

A statue of Robert Milligan by Richard Westmacott was installed at the West India Docks in London, in 1813. Milligan was a prominent merchant who was largely responsible for the construction of the West India Docks. After being put in storage in 1943, the statue was re-erected by the London Docklands Development Corporation in 1997.

On 9 June 2020 the statue was removed, coinciding with the launch of the Commission for Diversity in the Public Realm by the Mayor of London, Sadiq Khan, established to review statues of figures associated with the Atlantic slave trade.

== History ==
Robert Milligan (1746–1809) was a prominent Scottish merchant, ship-owner and slave-factor, who was the driving force behind the construction of the West India Docks in London. The statue was commissioned by the West India Dock Company from the sculptor Richard Westmacott in May 1809, following Milligan's death. From its installation in 1813 the statue stood by the Hibbert Gate, until 1875 when it was moved to the North Gate. It was put into storage in 1943, where it remained until 1997, when it was re-erected at its original location on the West India Dock by the London Docklands Development Corporation. The Museum of London Docklands opened in buildings directly behind the statue in 2003.

=== "Father of the Island" in 1998 ===
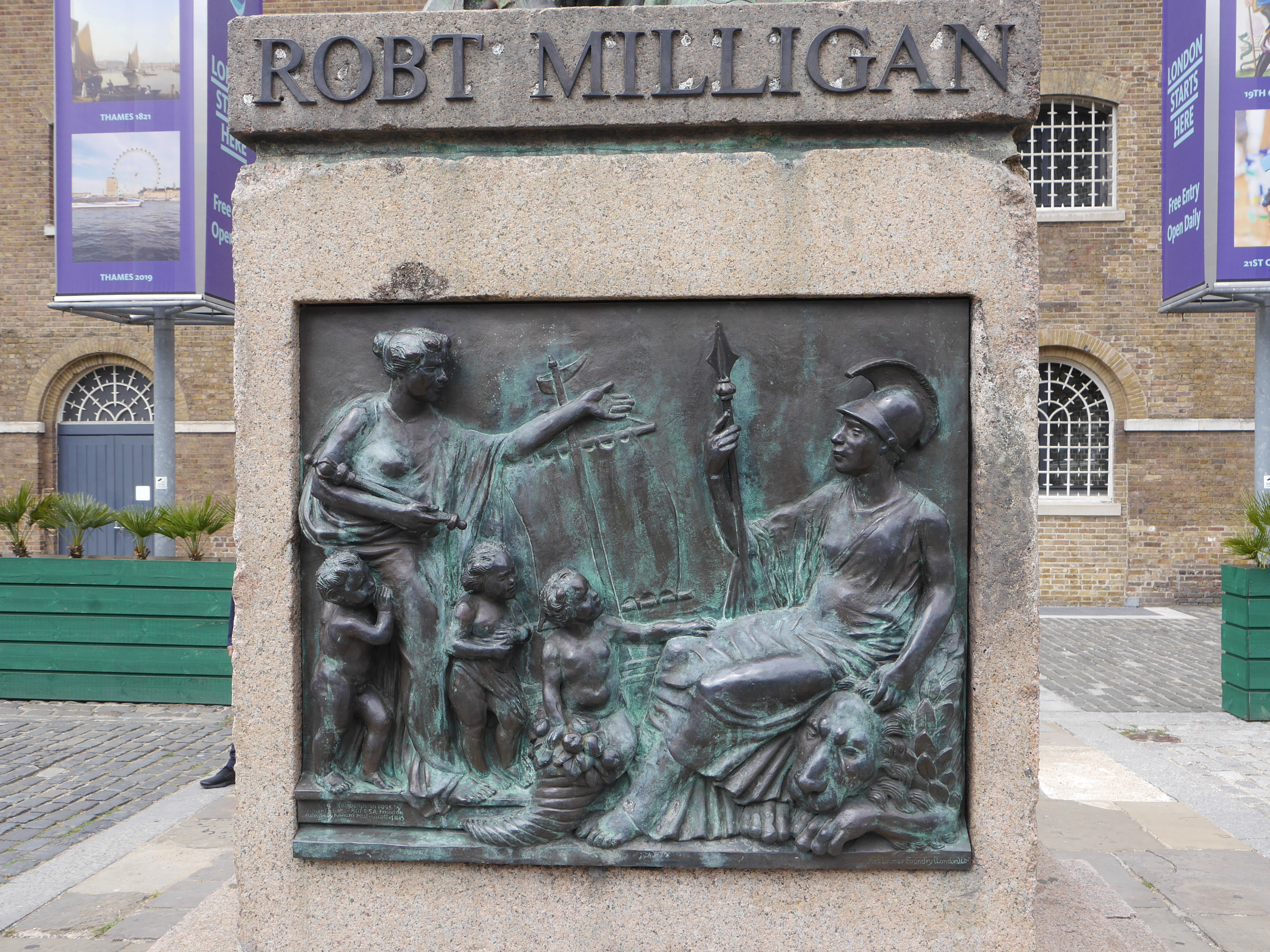
Detail of the relief on the pedestal

In 1998 an article in The Islander, a community newspaper sponsored by the Association of Island Communities on the local Isle of Dogs, published a photograph of the statue with another featuring Max Hebditch, at the time director of the Museum of London Docklands, with Roger Squire, at that time the Joint Chief Executive of the London Docklands Development Corporation, who had made the arrangements to return the statue to its original place. The article argued that Milligan was a genius who had persuaded the city merchants to build the West India Docks on the Isle of Dogs, rather than in Wapping. Dubbing Milligan "the father of the Isle of Dogs", the article called for Wednesday 12 July 2000 to be celebrated as the bicentenary of the laying of the docks' foundation stone in 1800.

=== Shrouding in 2007 ===
In 2007, when the Museum of London Docklands opened the London, Sugar and Slavery gallery, the connection between the West India Dock, the sugar warehouses which now house the museum and the exploitation of enslaved Africans on West Indian sugar plantations was made explicit. The 1811 portrait of George Hibbert by Thomas Lawrence had been moved from a place where he had been revered as playing a heroic role in the creation of the dock to a position in the new gallery with a caption clarifying his role as a politician and slave owner who resisted the abolition of slavery. In November, at the time of the opening of the exhibition, the statue of Robert Milligan was shrouded in black cloth, tied up with rope – although this was removed after the event. The museum also elicited the thoughts of members of the public as regards the statue in relation to Milligan's involvement with the enslavement of Africans.

=== Removal in 2020 ===
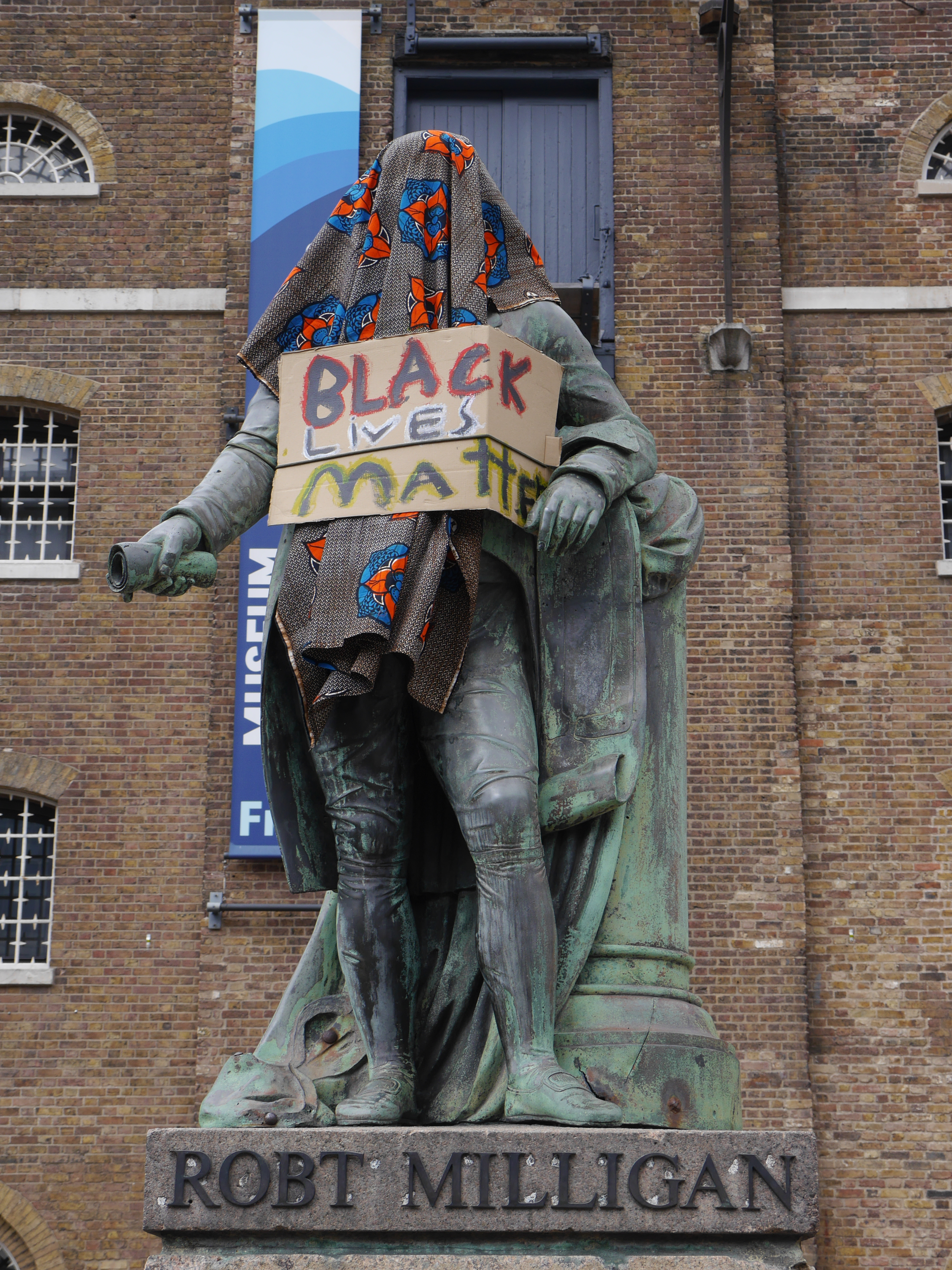
The vandalized statue in 2020

Following the vandalism and removal of Edward Colston's statue in Bristol by anti-racism protesters in response to the murder of George Floyd, a petition was launched to remove the statue of Milligan. Set up by Labour councillor Ehtasham Haque, it attracted 4,000 signatures in less than two days. He described the fact that the statue still existed in 2020 as "an insult to humanity". A series of evening protests was planned.

The statue was covered with a shroud by protesters, and placards were attached to it. On 9 June 2020, the Museum of London Docklands issued a statement saying how this made the statue an "object of protest", and said that they believed it should remain so for as long as the statue remained. They added that they "advocate for the statue of Robert Milligan to be removed on the grounds of its historical links to colonial violence and exploitation." Later that day, the statue was removed by the local authority, and the landowners the Canal & River Trust, to "recognise the wishes of the community". The statue was removed on the same day that Sadiq Khan announced plans to establish a Commission for Diversity in the Public Realm.

== Museum ownership ==
In March 2022 the Canal & River Trust, which owned the statue, donated it to the Museum of London. The intention is to display the statue at the London Museum Docklands (the name of the site since 2024) in due course.

== See also ==
- List of monuments and memorials removed during the George Floyd protests
- List of public art formerly in London
- List of public statues of individuals linked to the Atlantic slave trade
- Actions against memorials in the United Kingdom during the George Floyd protests
