= List of public statues of individuals linked to the Atlantic slave trade =

This is a list of public statues of individuals linked to the Atlantic slave trade.

== United Kingdom ==
Statue		Location	Relation to slavery	Ref
Statue of John Cass	Statue of John Cass	31 Jewry Street, London	John Cass was one of the major developers of the Atlantic slave trade and had direct business contacts with slave agents in the Caribbean and African forts. An 18th-century lead statue of Cass by Louis-François Roubiliac, commissioned by the Sir John Cass Foundation, was sited for many years on Aldgate High Street, but was moved to the John Cass Institute in Jewry Street in 1869. It was removed to the Guildhall in 1980. A fibreglass replica was placed in the empty niche of the John Cass Institute in Jewry Street in 1998. Several copies have been made; one is sited in the entrance lobby of the London Metropolitan University Archive.	
Statue of Sir Francis Drake	Statue of Sir Francis Drake	Plymouth Road, Tavistock	Sir Francis Drake was involved with capture, transport, and sale of slaves across his career, and was particularly influential in establishing early British slave trade.	
Statue of Thomas Guy	Statue of Thomas Guy	Forecourt of Guy's Hospital, London	Thomas Guy owned a substantial shareholding in the South Sea Company. Guys and St Thomas' NHS Foundation Trust said in a statement that they would work with the Commission for Diversity in the Public Realm to "...consider the right way forward. We recognise and understand the anger felt by the black community and are fully committed to playing our part in ending racism, discrimination and inequality".	
Statue of Edward Colston	Statue of Edward Colston	Bristol	The statue of Edward Colston, a slave trader, was toppled and thrown into the Bristol Harbour by protesters.	
Statue of James II, Trafalgar Square	Statue of James II	Trafalgar Square, London	The Duke of York James, later James II of England, was the principal Governor of the Royal African Company and its largest shareholder.	
Statue of Robert Milligan	Statue of Robert Milligan	London	Statue of Robert Milligan, Scottish merchant and slave trader, outside the Museum of London Docklands. It was removed following a request from the Canal & River Trust.	
Statue of Robert Geffrye	Statue of Robert Geffrye	London	Robert Geffrye was an English merchant who made part of his wealth from slavery, and part-owned a slave ship. A petition was raised for the removal of his statue outside the Museum of the Home; the Museum elected to "reinterpret and contextualise" the statue in its current location.	

=== Commission for Diversity in the Public Realm ===
In June 2020 the Mayor of London, Sadiq Khan, established the Commission for Diversity in the Public Realm to "review and improve diversity across London's public realm to ensure the capital's landmarks suitably reflect London's achievements and diversity". Khan said "When you look at the public realm – street names, street squares, murals – not only are there some of slavers that I think should be taken down, and the commission will advise us on that, but actually we don’t have enough representation of people of colour, black people, women, those from the LGBT community."

Khan also announced a pledge to create a National Slavery museum or memorial.

== Channel Islands ==
Statue	Location	Relation to slavery	Ref
Statue of George Carteret	Saint Peter, Jersey	A statue of Sir George Carteret, a loyalist of the future Charles II during the reign of Oliver Cromwell, was erected in 2014 to mark the 350th birthday of New Jersey. It was repeatedly defaced in 2020, in the aftermath of the George Floyd protests.	

== See also ==
- Atlantic slave trade
- Iconoclasm
