= Actions against memorials in the United Kingdom during the George Floyd protests =

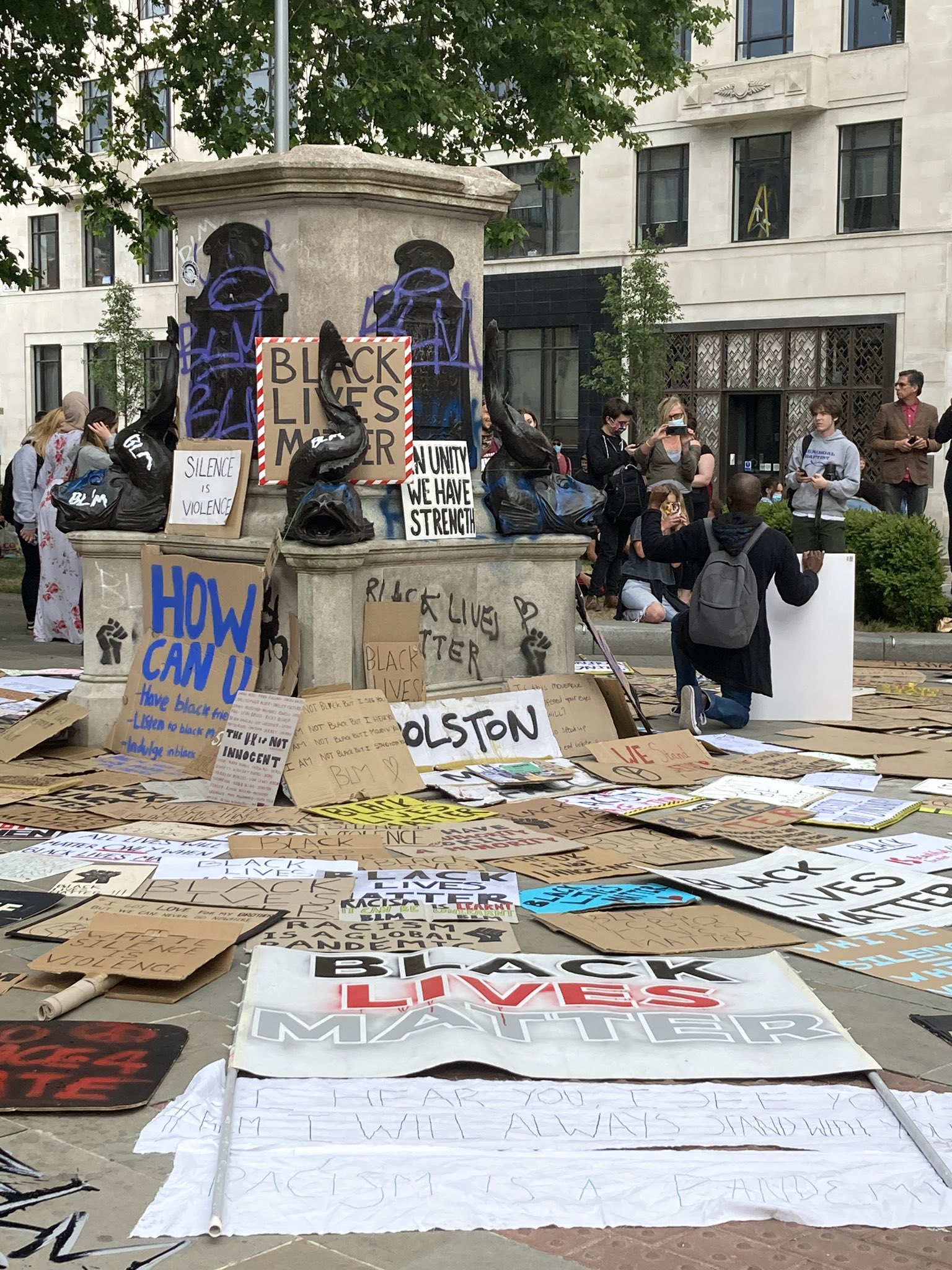
The empty plinth of the statue of Edward Colston in Bristol

A number of statues and memorials were the subject of protests and petitions during the George Floyd protests in the United Kingdom in 2020.

== Background ==
For several years, a campaign entitled Rhodes Must Fall had worked towards the removal of statues to Cecil Rhodes. A list of 60 statues, monuments and plaques considered by activists to "celebrate slavery and racism" was published online as an interactive map titled Topple the Racists by the Stop Trump Coalition. In addition to Rhodes, historical figures listed included Christopher Columbus, Sir Francis Drake, Oliver Cromwell, King Charles II, Admiral Lord Nelson, the prime ministers Earl Grey and William Ewart Gladstone.

== England ==
The statue of Winston Churchill in Parliament Square, London, had graffiti sprayed on it over two successive days, including the phrase "Churchill was a racist", alluding to his much disputed views on race. The memorial to Queen Victoria in Leeds was also vandalised. On 5 June, a group of protesters sprayed the abbreviation "ACAB", meaning All Cops Are Bastards, on the memorial to Earl Haig in Whitehall, London; when soldiers from the Household Cavalry in plain clothes scrubbed the graffiti off, protesters shouted abuse at them for doing so.

The statue of Edward Colston in The Centre, Bristol, was toppled and thrown into Bristol Harbour on 7 June. However, in the subsequent criminal proceedings four people were charged with criminal damage but acquitted by a jury after a trial.

On the same day, a protester climbed onto the Cenotaph in London and unsuccessfully attempted to set fire to the Union Flag.

A sculpted head of a black man was removed from the 18th-century inn sign of the Green Man in Ashbourne, Derbyshire. The act was performed by residents of the town, who said that they had done so in order to protect it from vandalism. The sculpture was later returned to the local council, its legal owner.

In Oxford, a crowd of protesters gathered outside Oriel College, demanding that its statue of Cecil Rhodes be removed.

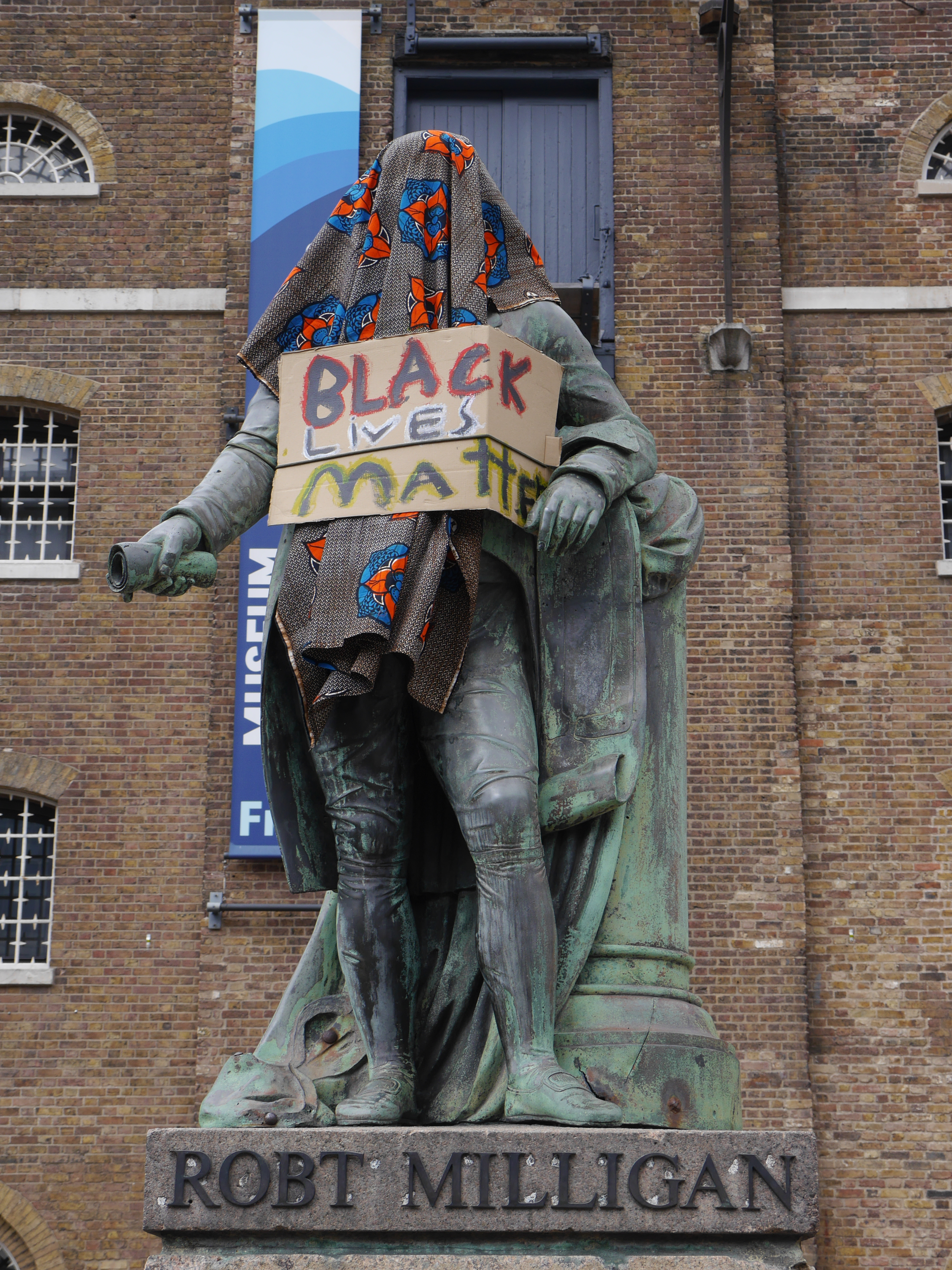
The statue of Robert Milligan on 9 June 2020, the day of its removal

On 9 June the Mayor of London, Sadiq Khan, announced the formation of the Commission for Diversity in the Public Realm, which would conduct a review of the capital's public landmarks. The Labour politician Lord Adonis asked the Government to begin a public consultation on the statue of Robert Clive outside the Foreign and Commonwealth Office. That evening the statue of Robert Milligan, a merchant and slave trader, outside the Museum of London Docklands was removed by the local authority and the Canal & River Trust.

On 11 June the Guy's and St Thomas' NHS Foundation Trust, the Guy's and St Thomas' Charity and King's College London issued a joint statement announcing that the statue of Robert Clayton at St Thomas' Hospital and that of Thomas Guy at the hospital named after him would be removed from public view.

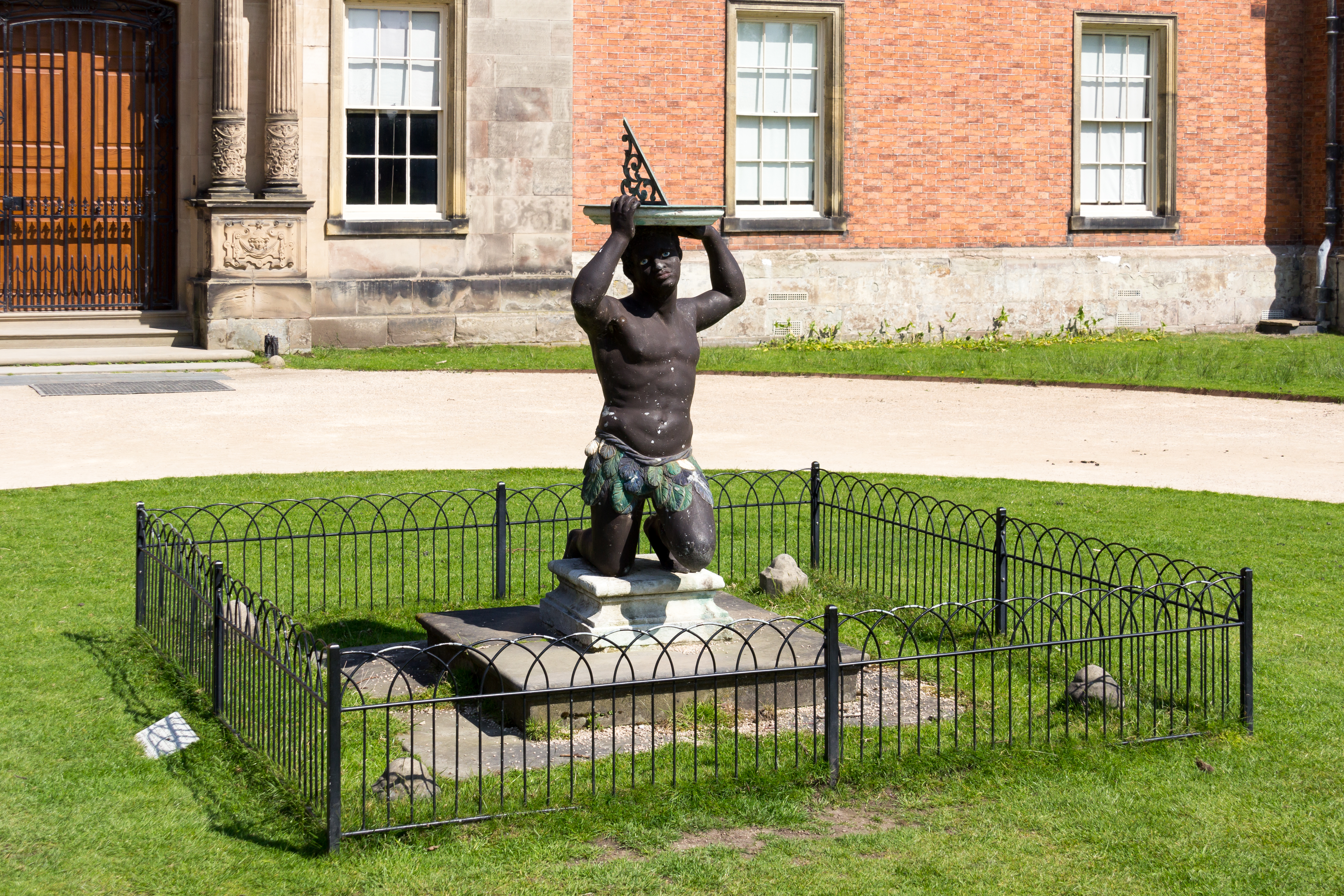
The ‘kneeling slave’ or 'blackamoor' holding a sundial on his head outside Dunham Massey Hall, which was moved to storage.

In June 2020, the National Trust removed the Grade II-listed, eighteenth-century statue Dunham Massey Hall sundial from the forecourt of Dunham Massey Hall in Greater Manchester. It depicted a kneeling blackamoor carrying the sundial above his head, a depiction seen as degrading, being categorised as a 'kneeling slave'. The statue was set up as one monument to honour the 1st Earl of Warrington by his son, the second Earl in c. 1735 and cast after a model by John Nost I for William III of England’s Privy Garden at Hampton Court Palace.

A statue of Robert Baden-Powell in Poole, Dorset, was slated for temporary removal after criticism over events during his army career and his comments of support concerning Adolf Hitler and Mein Kampf, but initial attempts to remove it faced technical difficulties and local people later prevented council workers from removing it.

The Shadow Foreign Secretary Lisa Nandy raised concerns about the Empire murals (1914–1921) by Sigismund Goetze in the Foreign and Commonwealth Office in a letter to the Foreign Secretary, Dominic Raab.

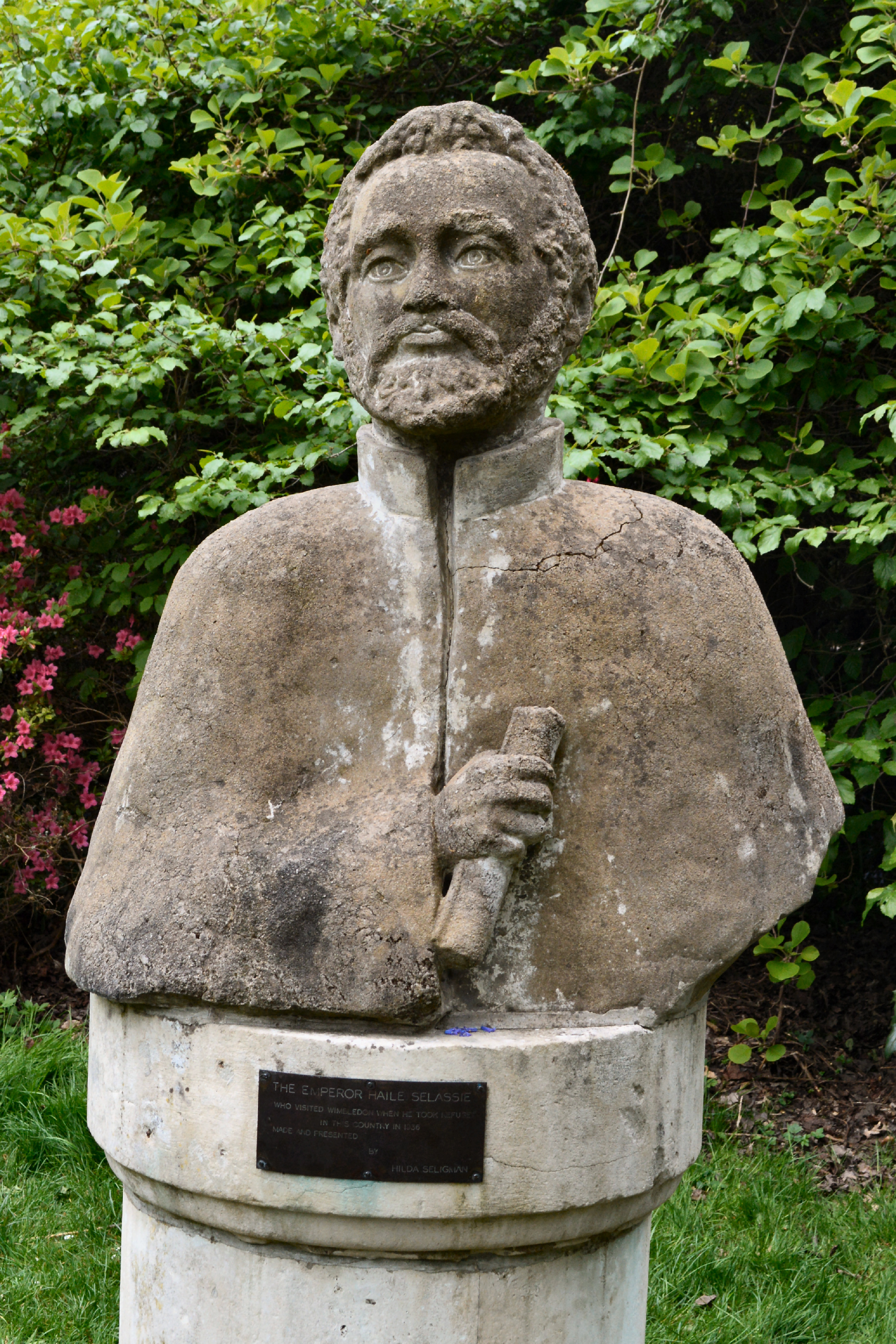
The bust of Haile Selassie in Wimbledon, photographed in 2019

Following the toppling of the statue of Ras Makonnen, a functionary of the Ethiopian Empire, in Harar, Ethiopia, a bust of his son Haile Selassie was toppled in Cannizaro Park, Wimbledon, South West London. Demonstrations had spread across Ethiopia following the murder of Oromo singer and activist Hachalu Hundessa on 29 June 2020. The bust in London was destroyed by Oromo activists.

The statue of Robert Clive in Shrewsbury was the subject of two petitions in favour of its removal and one against; the first two combined received about three times the number of signatures than the third. Shropshire Council voted 28–17 against taking any action to remove the statue.

== Scotland ==
There were protests against the Melville Monument in Edinburgh due to the disputed belief that Henry Dundas, 1st Viscount Melville, whom it commemorates, led to a delay in the abolition of slavery, and due to his long association with the slave trade. Graffiti was sprayed onto the monument and calls were made for it to be taken down.

In a number of streets in Glasgow, activists placed new name placards under the names of streets named after individuals with connections to the slave trade. Among these is Buchanan Street, named after Andrew Buchanan, who owned plantations in Virginia, which protesters renamed George Floyd Street.

The equestrian statue of Robert the Bruce, Bannockburn, was defaced with graffiti on 12 June.

== Wales ==
Rhondda Cynon Taf County Borough Council announced "an urgent review of all local authority-owned sites and buildings in the county borough to determine what statues, busts, plaques and memorials are present at these locations. If it is the case that any of these may be deemed inappropriate then we will be requesting officers to ensure that they are removed from those particular locations".

A statue of Thomas Picton is part of a display of statues named "Heroes of Wales" in Cardiff's City Hall, unveiled in 1916. In June 2020 the Lord Mayor of Cardiff, Dan De'Ath, and the leader of Cardiff Council, Huw Thomas, supported calls to remove the statue due to Picton's treatment of slaves. A campaign to remove Picton's monument in Carmarthen also arose.

A plaque in Brecon dedicated to Thomas Phillips, the captain of the slave ship Hannibal, was removed by an unknown person. Brecon town council said in a statement that it would "in consultation with the local community and interested parties will take time to consider what, if anything, should take its place". The plaque had been "under review" by the council before its disappearance but no decision had been made on its future.

== See also ==
- Racism in the United Kingdom
- Slavery in Britain
- Slavery at common law
- Statue of George Carteret in Jersey, a British Crown Dependency
- Décolonisation de l'espace public (fr)
