= George Carteret, 1st Baron Carteret =

British peer

- Arms of Baron Carteret: Quarterly: 1st and 4th, gules, four fusils in fess argent; 2nd and 3rd, gules, three claricords or.
- Born: July 1667
- Died: 22 September 1695 (aged 28)
- Spouse: Grace Granville
- Children: 1+, including John
- Father: Philip Carteret
- Relatives: George Carteret (grandfather); Edward Montagu (grandfather)

George Carteret, 1st Baron Carteret (July 1667 – 22 September 1695) was son of Sir Philip Carteret (died 1672) and the grandson of Vice Admiral Sir George Carteret, 1st Baronet (died 1680). His mother was Lady Jemima Montagu, a daughter of Edward Montagu, 1st Earl of Sandwich.

== Biography ==
Carteret was left an orphan at the age of five, and was brought up by his grandmother Elizabeth de Carteret, a daughter of Philippe de Carteret II, 3rd Seigneur de Sark, whom Samuel Pepys called "the most kind lady in the world".

In 1681, when Carteret was fourteen, King Charles II created him Baron Carteret, of Hawnes, in recognition of his late grandfather's outstanding loyalty to the House of Stuart, both during the English Civil Wars and after the Restoration.

Carteret married Lady Grace Granville, a daughter of John Granville, 1st Earl of Bath, and by her was the father of John Carteret, 2nd Earl Granville and 2nd Baron Carteret.

Carteret died in 1695, aged only 26; his widow outlived him by half a century and in 1715 was created Countess Granville.

== Notes ==
Peerage of England
New creation	Baron Carteret; 1st creation 1681–1695	Succeeded by John Carteret
Baronetage of England
Preceded by George Carteret	Baronet (of Melesches); 1680–1695	Succeeded by John Carteret
