= Statue of George Carteret =

Statue in Saint Peter, Jersey

- Artist: Laury Dizengremel
- Year: 2014; 12 years ago
- Location: Saint Peter, Jersey, United Kingdom; 49°12′46″N 2°10′58″W

A statue of George Carteret stands in Saint Peter, Jersey. A work of the sculptor Laury Dizengremel, it was erected in Saint Peter's Square in 2014, to mark the 350th anniversary of the founding of New Jersey by Carteret. The idea for erecting the statue was conceived by John Refault, Constable of Saint Peter, who secured over £36,000 of public funds towards its erection.

== History ==
In June 2020, following the murder of George Floyd and the widespread removal and destruction of monuments connected to systemic racism, the statue was defaced with white paint, ostensibly due to Carteret's involvement with the Royal African Company. The company has been called "the single most prolific trader of slaves". In response to petitions and calls for the statue to be put in a museum, Richard Vibert (Constable of Saint Peter) committed to discussing the possibility of placing a plaque next to the statue explaining Carteret's connections with the slave trade. In August 2020 the statue was attacked again by vandals who threw red paint and chains over it.

The sculptor writes, “I deplore this controversy. I wish I never had anything to do with it. I wish I’d never made that sculpture but I did, so now that I’ve made it the best thing I can think of is shove it in a museum – that sounds like a good idea with an interpretation that gives the full picture of this guy.”

== See also ==
- Actions against memorials in Great Britain during the George Floyd protests
- List of public statues of individuals linked to the Atlantic slave trade
