= George Carteret =

Royal Navy officer, politician and courtier (1610–1679)

Vice-Admiral Sir George Carteret Bt PC
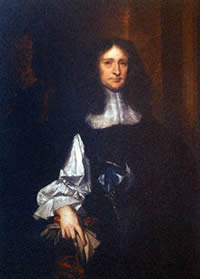
- Sir George Carteret

Treasurer of the Navy
- In office 4 July 1660 – 28 June 1667
- Preceded by: Richard Hutchinson
- Succeeded by: Arthur Annesley, Earl of Anglesey

Vice-Treasurer of Ireland
- In office 28 June 1667 – 1669
- Preceded by: Arthur Annesley, Earl of Anglesey
- Succeeded by: Francis Aungier, Lord Aungier

Vice-Chamberlain of the Household
- In office 1660 – 14 January 1680
- Preceded by: Vacant
- Succeeded by: Henry Savile

Personal details
- Born: c. 1610 St Peter, Jersey
- Died: 14 January 1680

Arms of Baronet Carteret: Quarterly: 1st and 4th, gules, four fusils in fess argent; 2nd and 3rd, gules, three claricords or.

Vice-Admiral Sir George Carteret, 1st Baronet (c. 1610 – 14 January 1680 N.S.) was a Royal Navy officer, politician and courtier who served in the Clarendon ministry as Treasurer of the Navy. He was also one of the original lords proprietor of the English colonies of Carolina and New Jersey. Carteret, New Jersey, and Carteret County, North Carolina are named after him.

== Early life ==
Carteret was the son of Elias de Carteret and Elizabeth Dumaresq of Jersey, who both died in 1640. Elias was the son of Philippe de Carteret I, 2nd Seigneur of Sark. With the help of his uncle Philippe de Carteret II, 3rd Seigneur of Sark, George was able to gain a position in the Royal Navy (George dropped the "de" from his surname when he entered the English navy, concerned that it sounded too French).

George Carteret was "bred for the sea" and served as an officer in various naval ships, being commissioned as a Lieutenant of the Garland in 1629. In 1631, he served under Vice-Admiral Sir John Penington on the Bonaventure.

During this time the young Carteret and Admiral Penington became friends. This friendship would serve Carteret well, as when Penington became the Admiral of the Narrow Seas in 1632, Carteret was given prominent positions throughout the 1630s. He was promoted to Captain in 1635, and commanded the Mary Rose and the Happy Entrance. Carteret joined a small group of Naval Captains in presenting a memorial of the Navy to King Charles I. According to Samuel Pepys, Carteret was responsible for presenting and recommending the first use of frigates in the Royal Navy, from blueprints of a Frenchman in Saint-Malo.

In 1637, Carteret became involved in raids in the Pirate Republic of Salé in order to rescue Christian captives who were held there. In 1641, Carteret was a Vice-Admiral in command of the Rainbow. He was given the position of the Comptroller of the Navy in November 1641, for his service to King Charles II.

As a result of his early life at sea, he received little or no formal education. His ignorance was embarrassing and a source of much ridicule in later life. Andrew Marvell mocked his poor command of English, and Samuel Pepys remarked that his ignorance of even the most basic Latin phrases would cause a schoolboy to be whipped. "Such ignorance is not to be borne in a Privy Councillor", wrote Pepys severely.

== English Civil War ==
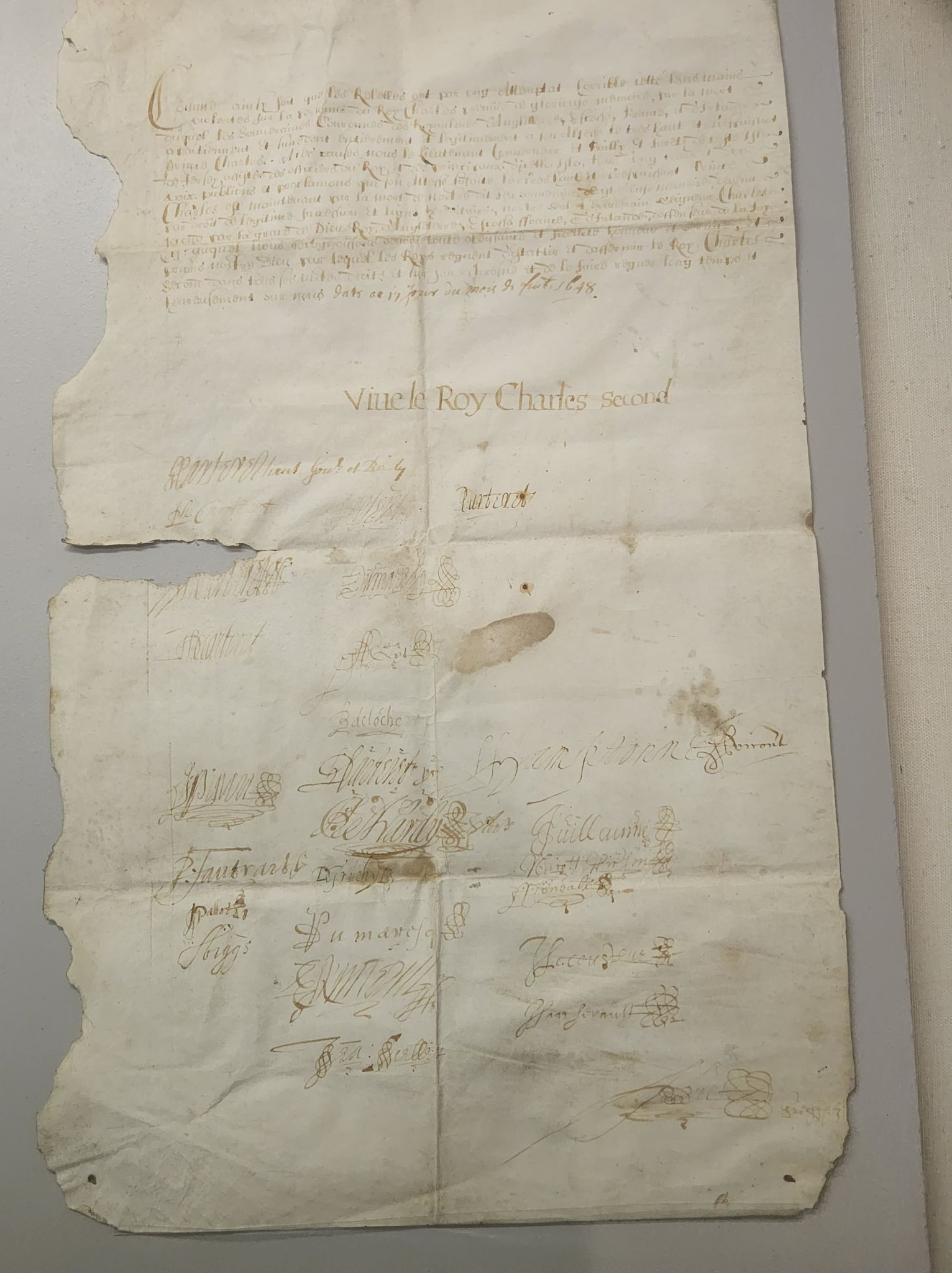
Sir George Carteret's Proclamation of King Charles II in Jersey 1649

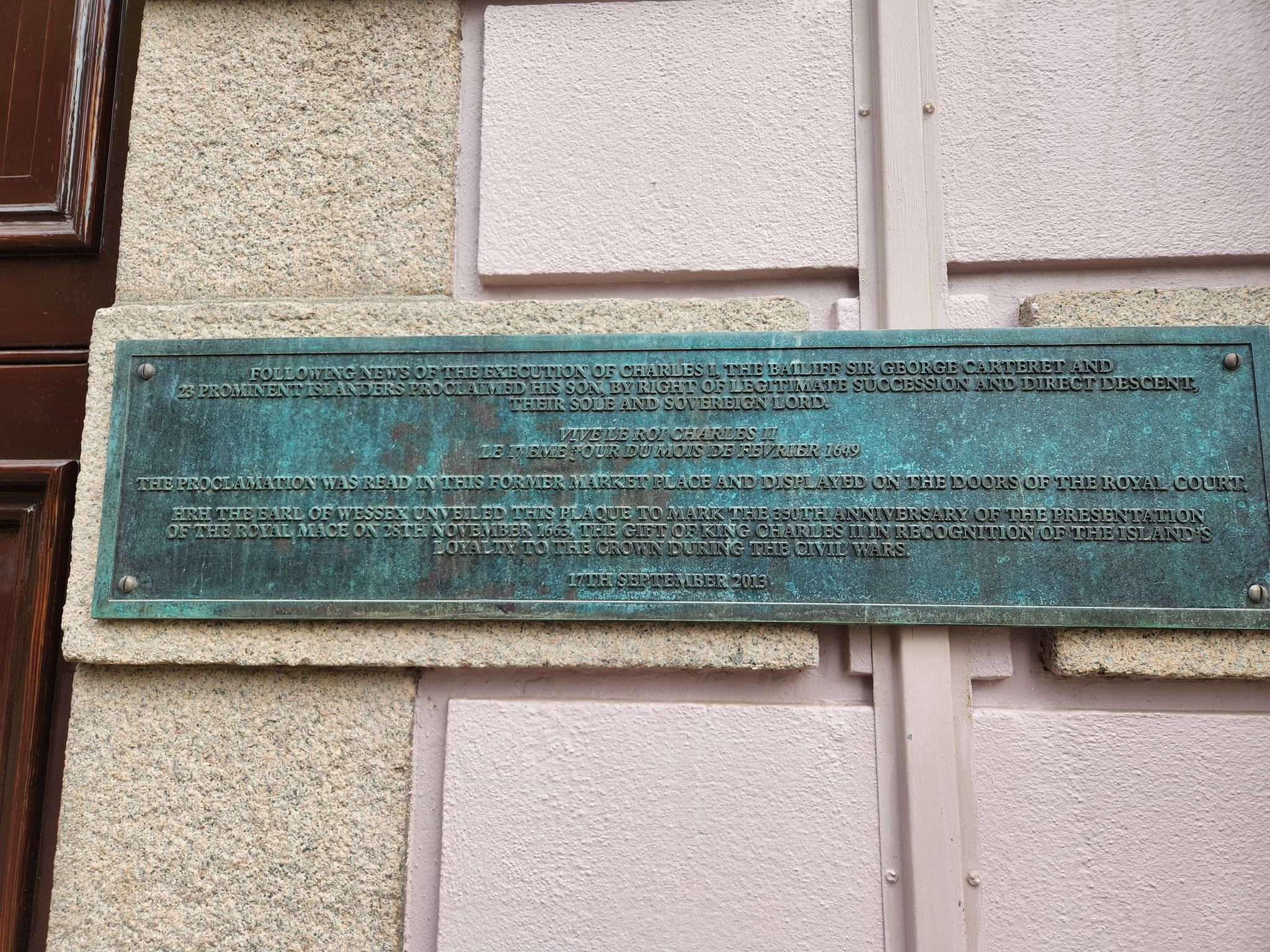
Spot of the Proclamation of King Charles II in Jersey 1649

Carteret quietly tried to carry on his duties at Comptroller of the Navy during the political fallout that had erupted between the supporters of Charles I and the supporters of Parliament. Many within the rank and file of the Royal Navy supported the Parliamentarian cause and Robert Rich, 2nd Earl of Warwick, a keen parliamentarian, was made the High Lord Admiral of the Royal Navy in 1642 over Carteret's former commanding officer, John Penington, who was a royalist.

On the commencement of the Civil War, he retired from the Navy, and withdrew with his family to Jersey, where his uncle, Sir Philippe II, was the Bailiff and Lieutenant-Governor. The Island descended into conflict in 1643, with George and his uncle fighting on the side of the Royalists. The Royalists managed to hold onto the twin fortresses of Mont Orgueil and Elizabeth Castle and soon were able to rout the Island's Parliamentarian supporters. Carteret governed Jersey with great severity, imprisoning Parliamentarian supporters and confiscating their property.

Commissioned vice-admiral and knighted in 1645, Carteret conducted a successful privateering operation against Parliamentarian merchant ships. After the defeat of the Royalists on the mainland in 1645, Carteret afforded an asylum to the Prince of Wales (Charles Stuart) and other refugees of distinction within his government of Jersey, where he served as Bailiff (1643–1651).

Carteret organised the Jersey Militia along parish lines, creating twelve distinct units each with 150 infantrymen under a captain, a lieutenant, as well as a few light guns. Each parish had a small troop of dragoons or mounted infantry. Carteret also had a small private army made up of Royalist veterans, who had fled from England after the defeat of Charles I, and a collection of foreign mercenaries. George Carteret also had Charles II proclaimed King in St. Helier on 17 February 1649 having 23 other prominent people of Jersey including his cousins Sir Philip Carteret and Elias Dumaresq sign the proclamation, after the execution of his father, Charles I.

In 1651, a Parliamentarian expeditionary force was sent to capture the Islands. Colonel James Heane was appointed the military commander of the invasion force which numbered 3,000 men, comprising his own regiment, six companies of Sir Hardress Waller's foot, two troops of horse and 200 men from Guernsey. The naval commander was General-at-Sea Robert Blake, whose fleet included twelve warships and a further seventy supply ships and transports. The fleet was sighted at dawn on the 20 October to the north-east of Jersey and remained anchored in St. Ouen's Bay all day, waiting for favourable winds in order to start disembarking their troops on the shore.

Upon hearing this news, Sir George Carteret mobilized the Jersey Militia as well as his own professional soldiers. He dispatched the militia of Grouville to defend the town of St. Helier, the militia of St. Lawrence to defend the harbour at St. Aubin, and the militia of St. Brelade to defend the Bay of St. Brelade. Carteret took the bulk of the militia to St. Ouen's Bay, which they reached by noon on 20 October. In all, Carteret had about 2,000 men; 300 of which were cavalry, and the rest were infantry, and a score of cannon. With the bulk of the force being conscripts, however, it seems these men had little inclination for a pitched battle against the veterans of the New Model Army.

After several days of the Parliamentarian fleet trying to outmanoeuvre the Royalists (leading many militiamen to desert the Royalist cause), Admiral Blake decided to land his troops in the evening of the 22/23 October. Carteret noticed that some of the ships were heading for the shoreline and he gave the order for his army to prepare for battle. At first, the Royalist cavalry charge was able to throw the Parliamentarians back into the sea, with the militiamen firing into the ranks of the fleeing invaders.

However, at the crucial moment, the cavalry commander, Colonel Bovill, was struck by a musket bullet and mortally wounded. With this loss, the cavalry fled from the battlefield and, with their retreat, the militiamen soon began to desert despite the efforts of Carteret to rally them. Colonel Heane's troops then got themselves organized and disembarked without incident.

Colonel Heane soon began to overrun the Island, with no resistance being offered by the royalists. Carteret's sole plan was to hold onto the two castles of Mont Orgueil and Elizabeth Castle, as well as the fort on a small islet off St. Aubin's Bay, similar to the royalist strategy in 1643. This did not go according to plan, however, as the garrison of St. Aubin's Fort abandoned their posts to the oncoming parliamentarians on 23 October and Mont Orgueil, which was not suited to artillery warfare, surrendered on 25 October.

George Carteret, however, was determined to hold out at Elizabeth Castle, in the hopes that a royalist relief force from France would arrive, or in the hopes of frustrating the parliamentarians so much that they abandoned the siege.

Elizabeth Castle was a far more imposing fortification than the likes of Mont Orgueil or St. Aubin's Fort. The castle was built on a rocky islet, which was about a mile off the coast, which meant that it was surrounded by the sea on all sides and made it difficult to be bombarded from the land. It also had an arsenal of fifty-three cannon defending the site, which had ample munitions, and enough provisions for the garrison for about eight months. Nevertheless, Colonel Heane erected a number of batteries as close to Elizabeth Castle as possible and began to bombard the castle. Also within Heane's arsenal were three large mortars which fired massive bombs, which were emplaced on a battery near the old harbour of St. Helier.

On the night of 9/10 November, a mortar shell fell onto the roof of the old Abbey Church, which just so happened to be the building where the defenders had been keeping their munitions and gunpowder. The shell exploded on the lowest storey of the priory and detonated the twelve barrels of gunpowder inside, which caused a massive explosion. The blast destroyed several adjacent buildings, which buried forty members of the garrison nearby the blast under rubble. Of these, sixteen men were killed and another ten were wounded.

The blast also destroyed two thirds of food stores and beer and cider rations. A panic ensued amongst the garrison in the aftermath of the explosion, with a number of the defenders deserting their posts and fleeing to St. Helier. These men were quickly captured and interrogated by the parliamentarians, who provided Colonel Heane with valuable information on the state of the castle's fortifications. The morale in the remaining garrison quickly declined, especially after an incident in which a Jerseyman of the garrison was hanged for desertion.

Despite these setbacks, George Carteret was determined to hold out for as long as possible, and he proceeded to keep the King's Standard flying over Elizabeth Castle for nearly another month. In that time, he received word from Charles II who had stated plainly that the French Government were unwilling to help, for fear of sparking a diplomatic incident with the English Commonwealth. Carteret was, therefore, very much on his own. Negotiations commenced between the two sides on 5 December and, by the 15 December, it was agreed the defending garrison was to march out of the castle with full honours, with officers permitted to retain their swords, breastplates, and pistols. Sir George Carteret was allowed to take a single vessel, sail with all his possessions to France, and formally join the household of the exiled Charles II. On the eve of the surrender, Sir George invited Colonel Heane to dinner and they met each other on the rocks at the foot of Fort Charles (Bastion a part of Elizabeth castle). On 15 December, Sir George sailed to St. Malo on his four gun sloop, 'Scout', accompanied by the parliamentarian warship, 'Eagle'.

He stayed in exile in France for six years until he was imprisoned in 1657, thence he ventured to Venice. The warmth and kindness with which he received the refugees earned him a permanent place in the King's affections, and also the friendship of Edward Hyde, 1st Earl of Clarendon, the King's chief adviser during his exile and for the first few years after the Restoration.

== Restoration ==
At the Restoration, Carteret was appointed Vice-Chamberlain of the Household and was sworn into the Privy Council on 11 July 1660. The same year, he was also constituted Treasurer of the Navy, and his career in that office was documented in the diary of his colleague Samuel Pepys, who was appointed Clerk of the Acts to the Navy Board in 1660. In 1661, sponsored by the Admiralty, he was elected an MP for Portsmouth and sat in the Cavalier Parliament until 1679. Although he sat on a number of parliamentary committees, he was a fairly inactive MP and devoted more of his political efforts to the Privy Council.

His influence seems to have been at its height in 1665, when he boasted to Pepys that the King did nothing without his knowledge; however, as the naval war dragged on, the Treasurer of the Navy was an obvious target of the opposition, and Pepys noted that by the spring of 1666 Carteret was being attacked on all sides. In mid June 1667, he confessed to Pepys that he was considering retiring and was having difficulty in his search for a replacement. Less than two weeks later, he managed to exchange his office as Treasurer of the Navy with Arthur Annesley, Earl of Anglesey, for that of Vice-Treasurer of Ireland, an office which he sold in 1669 for £11,000.

In 1669, he faced expulsion from the House of Commons for misconduct as Vice Chamberlain, being accused of embezzlement. After a statement from the king expressing his satisfaction with Carteret and an acquittal by the House of Lords, the inquiry against him lapsed and he retained his office. He was, in fact, generally regarded as an honest man.

In 1673, he was appointed one of the Lords of the Admiralty, and continued career in this office and in that of Vice-Chamberlain of the Household until his death on 14 January 1680. Shortly before Carteret's death, the king proposed to give him the title Baron Carteret, but Carteret died too soon, so the honour was granted to his grandson George.

== American colonies ==
The fidelity with which Carteret, like John Berkeley, 1st Baron Berkeley of Stratton, had clung to the royal cause, gave him also great influence at court: he was close to Clarendon, and to the Earl of Sandwich, whose daughter married Carteret's eldest son. He had, at an early date, taken a warm interest in the colonization of America. In recognition of all the help given to him during his exile in Jersey in the 1640s, Charles II gave Carteret a large grant of land, part of the previously named New Netherland, which was promptly renamed New Jersey under his charge. With Berkeley, he became one of the proprietors of the Province of Carolina prior to their becoming jointly interested in East Jersey. Carteret County, North Carolina and town of Carteret, New Jersey are named after him, and the city of Elizabeth, New Jersey, is named after his wife, as is Elizabethtown, North Carolina.

In 1665, Carteret was one of the drafters of the Concession and Agreement, a document that provided freedom of religion in the colony of New Jersey. It was issued as a proclamation for the structure of the government for the colony written by the two proprietors, Lord Berkeley and Sir George Carteret.

Carteret was a signatory to The Several Declarations of The Company of Royal Adventurers of England Trading into Africa, a document published in 1667 which led to the expansion of the Royal Africa Company.

== Family ==
In the Chapel of Mont Orgueil Castle, May 1640, George Carteret married his cousin Elizabeth de Carteret, daughter of Philippe de Carteret II, 3rd Seigneur de Sark, and his wife Anne Dowse. They had three sons and five daughters:

- Philip (1641–1672), their eldest son, married Lady Jemima Montagu, daughter of the Earl of Sandwich, and had four children: his eldest son George was raised to the peerage. Philip was killed in action at the Battle of Sole Bay, along with his father-in-law; Jemima had died in childbirth in November of the previous year.
- James (died after 1679), served as a captain in the Royal Navy, and married and had children
- George (died 1656), who died unmarried.
- Elizabeth (who never married)
- Rachel
- Louisa-Margaret, who married Sir Robert Atkyns of Sapperton, only son of Sir Robert Atkyns, Lord Chief Baron of the Exchequer; her family nickname was "Louisonne", according to Samuel Pepys
- Anne (died 1668), "a pious and sweet-tempered lady", who married Sir Nicholas Slanning, 1st Baronet, no issue
- Caroline, who married Sir Thomas Scott of Scot's Hall, son of Edward Scott and Lady Catherine Goring, daughter of George Goring, 1st Earl of Norwich.

Samuel Pepys liked and admired Lady Carteret "the most kind lady in the world."

== Controversy ==
George Carteret is seen as a divisive figure in Jersey, with some seeing him very much as swashbuckling local hero and others as a prolific slave trader who made his fortune through piracy and slavetrading.

Jersey writer, Ollie Taylor, in his blog 'The whitewashing of George Carteret' says that on the one hand, 'Carteret has also been described as a hero, ‘Jersey’s greatest son’, one of “Jersey’s great figures” and a role model for youngsters.' But Taylor is also critical of a revisionist history saying, "By ignoring a fundamental part of Carteret’s story it ends up being exactly that, a rewriting of history'

He explains that, "He [Carteret] was one of the founding six committee members of the ‘Company of Royal Adventurers into Africa’, set up in 1660 to trade in gold, ivory and slaves. Which apparently was also a family affair with his son James ‘collecting’ over 300 slaves from Africa for transportation to the West Indies during one of the company’s early voyages in 1663. The company was succeeded nine years later and was the template for the ‘Royal African Company’, of whom Carteret was a consultant and early minor investor.

The Royal African Company went on to ship more African slaves to the Americas than any other institution in the history of the Atlantic slave trade. Between 1680 and 1688, it transported approximately 5,000 slaves a year totalling around 212,000 between 1662 and 1731. It’s estimated that 44,000 men, women and children died en route, with thousands of those who did survive arriving in the New World with the company’s initials branded on their chests."

In 2014, a Constable of Saint Peter sought and received over £36,000 in public funds to erect a statue of Carteret in Jersey, to commemorate the 350th anniversary of the founding of New Jersey. In June 2020, following the murder of George Floyd and the widespread removal and destruction of monuments of those involved in slave trading around the world, the statue in Saint Peter was defaced with white paint due to Carteret's involvement with the Royal Africa Company. One historian called the company "the single most prolific trader of slaves". After some residents of Jersey called for the statue to be moved to a museum, the statue remained in place. In August 2020, it was again defaced with red paint and chains.

== See also ==
- History of Jersey
- Statue of George Carteret

== Notes ==
- Firth, C. H.; Knighton, C.S. (reviewer) (January 2008) [2004]. "Carteret, Sir George, first baronet (1610?–1680)". Oxford Dictionary of National Biography (online ed.). Oxford University Press. doi:10.1093/ref:odnb/4803. (Subscription, Wikipedia Library access or UK public library membership required.) The first edition of this text is available at Wikisource: "Carteret, George" . Dictionary of National Biography. London: Smith, Elder & Co. 1885–1900.
- Henning, Basil Duke (1983). The House of Commons, 1660–1690. Vol. III. London: Secker&Warburg. p. 30. ISBN 0-436-19274-8.

Parliament of England
Preceded by Henry Whithed; Sir Andrew Henley, Bt	Member of Parliament for Portsmouth; 1661–1679; With: Richard Norton	Succeeded by Sir John Kempthorne; George Legge
Political offices
Preceded by Sir William Russell, Bt	Treasurer of the Navy; 1660–1667	Succeeded by The Earl of Anglesey
Vacant English interregnum Title last held by The Earl of Norwich	Vice-Chamberlain of the Household; 1660–1680	Succeeded by Henry Savile
Legal offices
Preceded by Philippe de Carteret II	Bailiff of Jersey; 1643–1651	Succeeded by Michel Lemprière
Preceded by Michel Lemprière	Bailiff of Jersey; 1660–1661	Succeeded by Philippe de Carteret III
Baronetage of England
New creation	Baronet (of Melesches); 1645–1680	Succeeded by George Carteret
