= Commission for Diversity in the Public Realm =

Body to review public art in London

The Commission for Diversity in the Public Realm was an initiative established on 9 June 2020 by the Mayor of London, Sadiq Khan, to review public tributes in the British capital, including statues and other landmarks. The commission concluded operations in early 2024.

== History ==
The commission was established in June 2020 following the global George Floyd protests, during which demonstrations in the United Kingdom led to the toppling of the Edward Colston statue in Bristol and widespread calls to re-examine public monuments.

The commission was to focus on increasing diversity in London's street names, monuments, public sculptures and artworks, murals and place names. The Greater London Authority stated that the initiative was not created to remove statues, but was instead mandated to "enrich and add to the public realm" and advise on contextualising existing monuments.

Its fifteen members were announced in February 2021, and included Riz Ahmed, Jack Guinness, Sandy Nairne and Jasvir Singh. It was co-chaired by Debbie Weekes-Bernard, Deputy Mayor for Social Integration, Social Mobility and Community Engagement, and Justine Simons, Deputy Mayor for Culture and Creative Industries.

In October 2021, Art UK published an audit of London's public monuments, funded by a £1 million grant from the commission. The study revealed 4 per cent depicted named individual women, compared to 20.5 per cent depicting named men.

In 2022 the commission announced its "Untold Stories" programme, to distribute £1 million of funding to community projects across the city. By February 2023, 70 projects had been funded across 24 London boroughs, with plans including a panel and bench commemorating the 1981 New Cross house fire, a memorial to Rolan Adams in Thamesmead, and a statue of Ella Adoo-Kissi-Debrah in Mountsfield Park, Lewisham. The commission also backed installations, including five permanent LGBTQ+ rainbow plaques, a transatlantic slave trade memorial at West India Quay, and a permanent HIV/AIDS memorial. The commission concluded operations in early 2024 after finishing its planned review of London's monuments and delivering its grant programmes.

== See also ==
- List of public statues of individuals linked to the Atlantic slave trade
- Actions against memorials in the United Kingdom during the George Floyd protests
- Mayor's Commission on African and Asian Heritage
- Custard Apple (Annonaceae), Breadfruit (Moraceae) and Soursop (Annonaceae) by Veronica Ryan, Hackney (2021)
- National Windrush Monument by Basil Watson, Waterloo station (2022)
- The Wake (sculpture) by Khaleb Brooks, West India Quay (planned for 2026)
