= Robert Milligan (merchant) =

Scottish merchant, ship-owner and slave trader

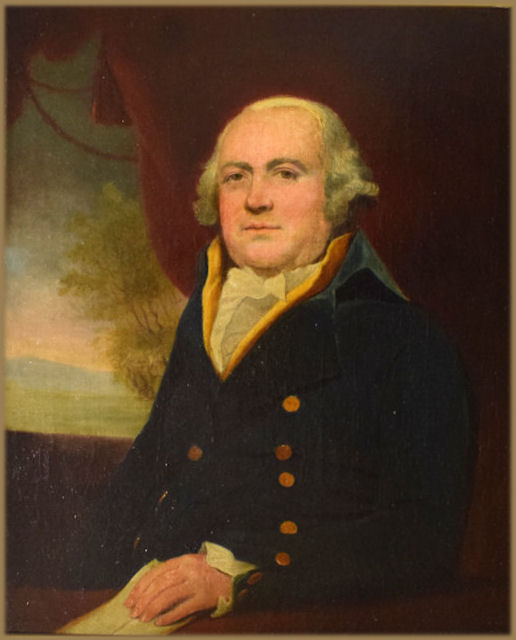
- a Portrait of Milligan by Lemuel Francis Abbott
- Born: 19 August 1746; Dumfries, Scotland
- Died: 21 May 1809 (aged 62); Hampstead, Middlesex, England
- Occupations: Slave factor, plantation co-owner, landmark London docks construction committee
- Years active: 1768-death
- Known for: Having built the West India Docks
- Notable work: West India Docks, Poplar, Middlesex
- Spouse: Jean Dunbar
- Children: 8

Robert Milligan (19 August 1746 – 21 May 1809) was a Scottish merchant, ship-owner and slave trader who was the driving force behind the construction and initial statutory sectoral monopoly of the West India Docks in London. From 1768 to 1779 Milligan was a merchant in Kingston, Jamaica. He left Jamaica in 1779 to establish himself in London, where he got married and had a family of eight children. He moved to Hampstead shortly before he died in 1809. By the time of his death, one of Milligan's partnerships had interests in estates in Jamaica which owned 526 slaves in their sugar plantations.

== Biography ==
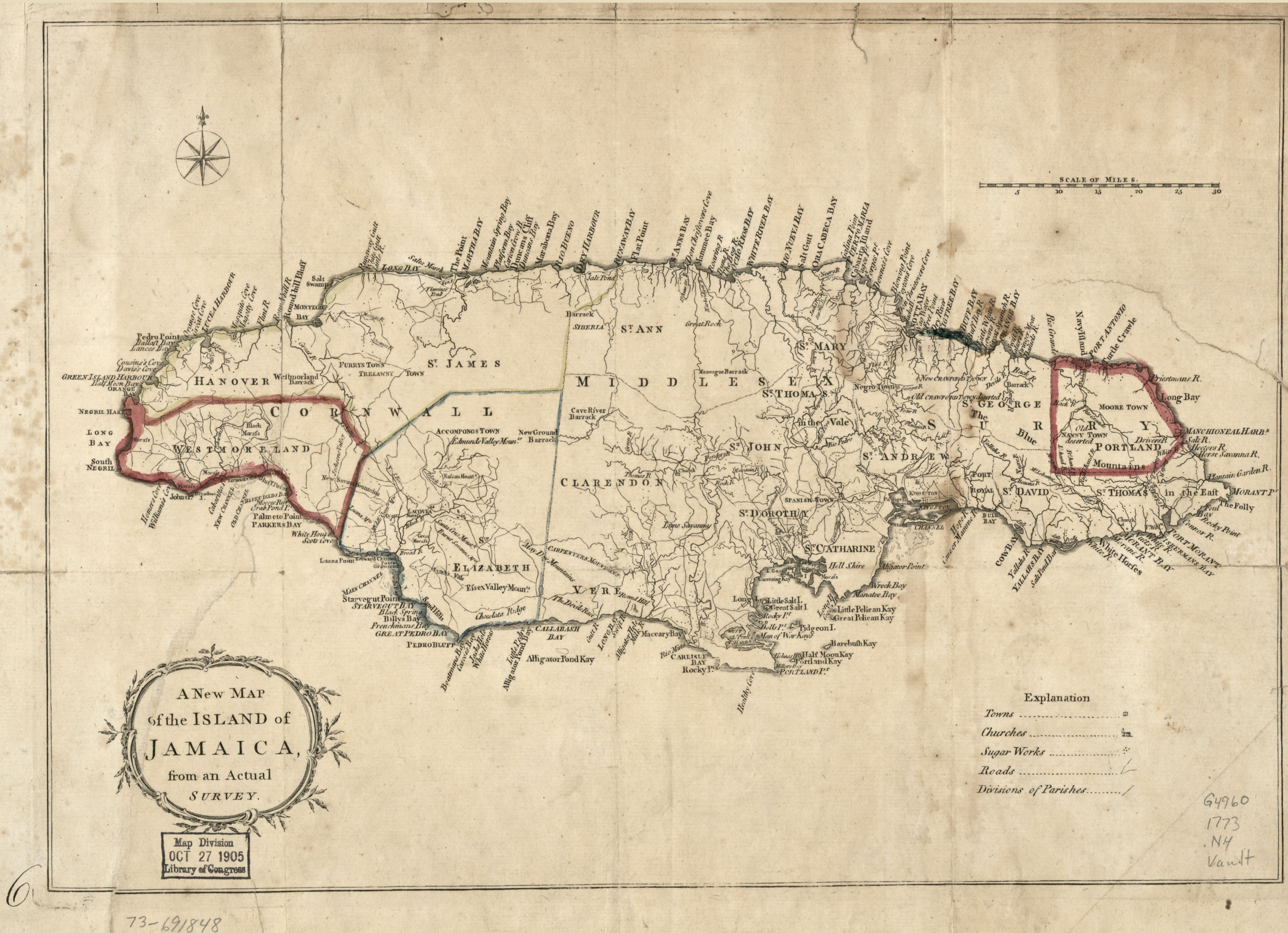
In this map of 1773 of Jamaica the small dots, not tightly clustered, are "sugar works", which were in that century almost exclusively worked by slaves

Milligan was born on 19 August 1746 in Dumfries, Scotland. Between about 1768 and 1779 he was a merchant in Kingston, Jamaica. One of his enterprises whilst in Jamaica was as a partner in Dick and Milligan, a firm which was involved in the bulk buying of slaves, to be sold on the island (slave factoring). Milligan also had a business relationship with another Scottish merchant in Jamaica, George Forteath. By the time he left Jamaica for England in 1779, Milligan had become a member of the Jamaica chamber of commerce.

After leaving Jamaica in 1779, Milligan settled in London. In 1781 he married Jean Dunbar, with whom he had eight children - five boys and three girls.

By 1794 Milligan had become a merchant in two London firms – Milligan and Allen and Milligan and Mitchell. The latter partnership, which lasted into the early 1800s, had interests in estates in Jamaica which, by 1807 owned 526 slaves in their sugar plantations in Kellet's and Mammee Gully.

In 1808, Milligan moved to a house in Hampstead. He died on 21 May 1809 at his Hampstead home, and he was buried in the local churchyard.

== West India Docks ==
Outraged at losses due to theft and delays at London's riverside wharves, Milligan headed a group of powerful businessmen who planned and built West India Docks, which was to have a monopoly on the import into London of West Indian produce such as sugar, rum and coffee for a period of 21 years. The Docks' foundation stone was laid in July 1800, when Milligan was Deputy Chairman of the West India Dock Company – his strong connections with the political establishment of the day were evident from those attending the ceremony, the stone being laid by Lord Chancellor Lord Loughborough and Prime Minister William Pitt the Younger as well as Company chairman George Hibbert and himself.

The Docks officially opened just over two years later in August 1802. Milligan later also served as Chairman of the Company.

== Memorial ==
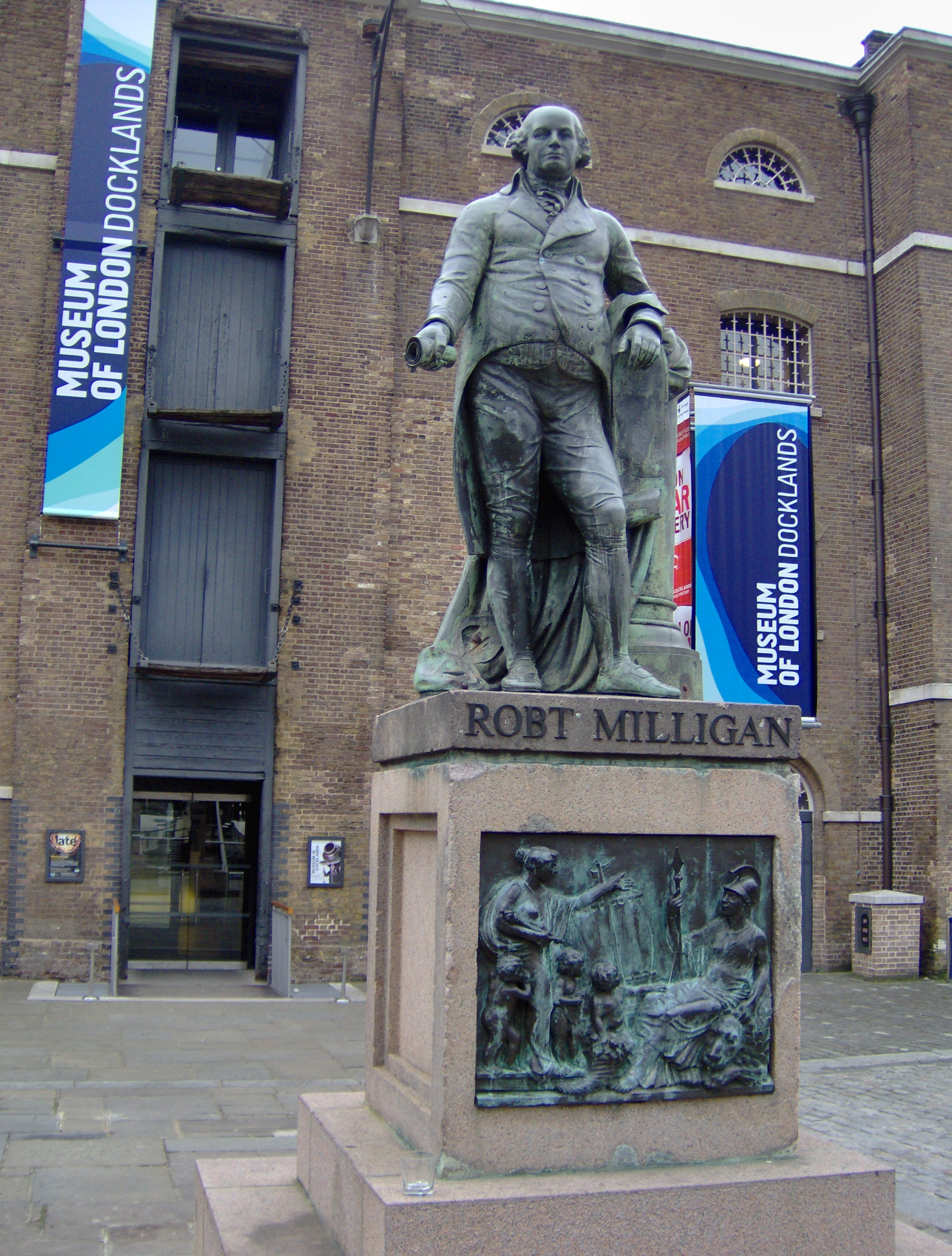
Statue of Robert Milligan formerly in front of the Museum of London Docklands, by Richard Westmacott

As a token of recognition of the part Milligan played in establishing the West India docks, "the directors and proprietors"..."by unanimous vote" (per its plaque) of the docks company erected a statue of him outside the dock offices. The statue, which was unveiled in 1813, was crafted by Richard Westmacott. The statue, which by then stood in front of the Museum of London Docklands, was removed on 9 June 2020 by the local authority to "recognise the wishes of the community", following the removal of Edward Colston's statue in Bristol by anti-racism protesters in response to the murder of George Floyd.

Milligan has also had a local street named after him: Milligan Street is located near Westferry DLR station, just off Narrow Street, Limehouse.

== See also ==
- List of monuments and memorials removed during the George Floyd protests
- List of public statues of individuals linked to the Atlantic slave trade
