= Philip Carteret (courtier) =

British courtier

Sir Philip Carteret
- Arms of Carteret: Quarterly: 1st and 4th, gules, four fusils in fess argent; 2nd and 3rd, gules, three claricords or.
- Born: 1641; Metesches, Jersey, Channel Island
- Died: 1672 (aged 30–31); Solebay, England
- Spouse: Jemima Montagu (m. 1665; died 1671)
- Children: 4, including George and Edward
- Father: George Carteret
- Relatives: Philippe de Carteret II (grandfather)

Sir Philip Carteret, FRS (1641 – 26 May 1672), was a courtier from the De Carteret family of Jersey. He was killed in the battle of Solebay.

== Biography ==
He was the eldest son of Sir George Carteret and his wife and cousin, Elizabeth de Cartetet.

Philip was elected Fellow of the Royal Society on 15 February 1665.

He married Lady Jemima Montagu, daughter of Edward Montagu, 1st Earl of Sandwich and Jemima Crewe, in an arranged marriage on 31 July 1665. Samuel Pepys had a hand in the marriage and wrote of it at some length in his diary. Jemima and Samuel were grandchildren of John Pepys of Cottenham and Elizabeth Bendish.

Lady Jemima had only known of Philip some 14 days before their marriage: Pepys did ask her if she could like Philip as a husband, and was relieved when she answered that she thought she could like him very well. Samuel noted that Jemima failed to arrive in time for the ceremony at the church. The couple settled on the family estate at Haynes, Bedfordshire. The marriage is thought to have been reasonably happy. Jemima died in childbirth in 1671.

Philip was father of four children, including George Carteret, 1st Baron Carteret.

Knighted at Whitehall in 1667, he became Gentleman of the King's Chamber in 1670.

Philip died along with his father-in-law, the Earl of Sandwich, when their ship, the Prince Royal, was grappled by a Dutch fire ship in the Battle of Solebay.
