= List of public art formerly in London =

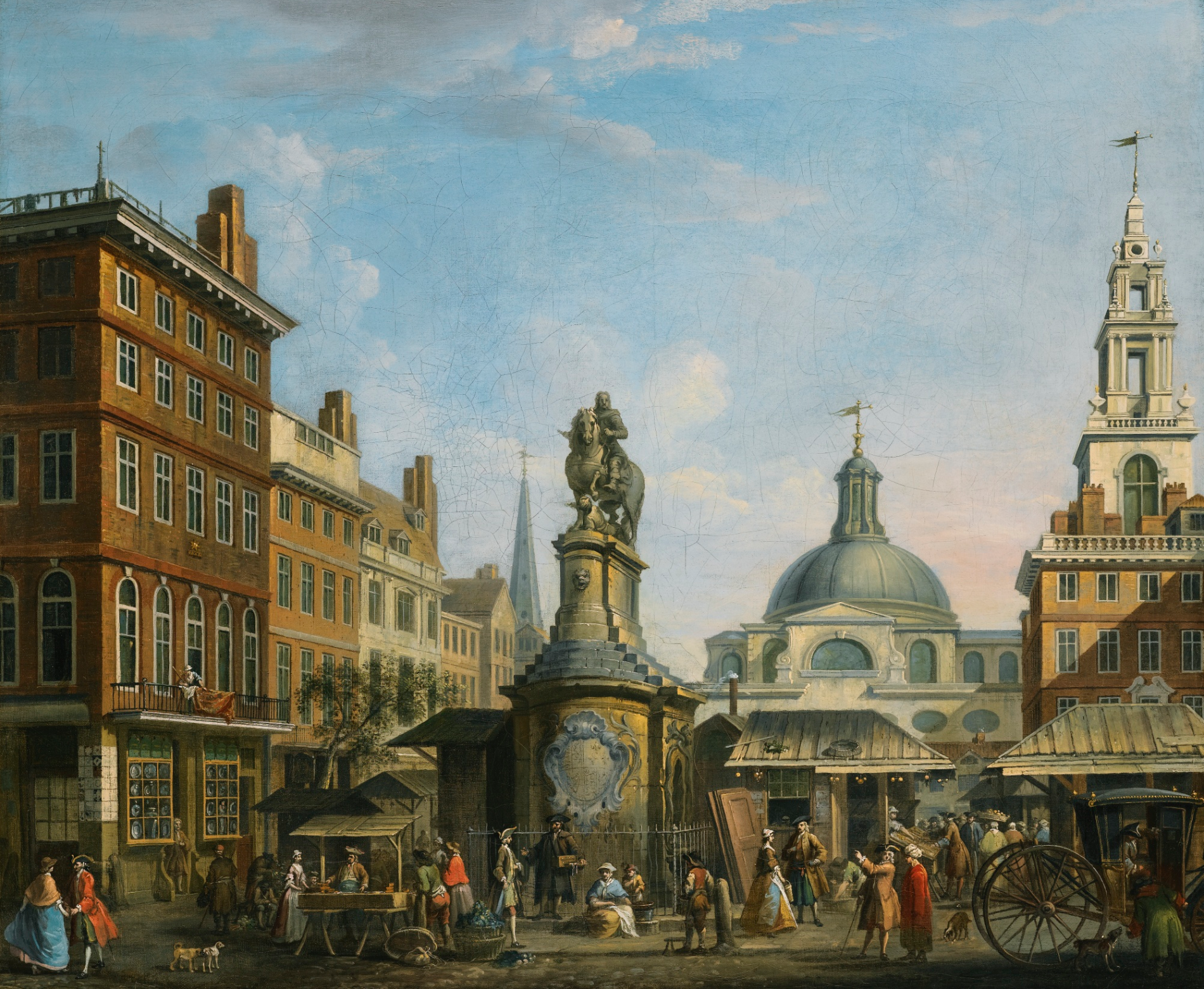
18th-century painting of the Stocks Market with the equestrian statue of Charles II (removed in 1739)

This article lists public artworks which used to exist in London, but which have either been destroyed or removed to another place. Works which have been moved within London are not included, nor are temporary installations such as those on the Fourth plinth at Trafalgar Square. However, where one statue has been removed and replaced by another similar one, the former is included in this list.

== Works removed or lost ==
Image	Title / subject	Location and coordinates	Date	Artist / designer	Architect / other	Type	Designation	Notes
More images	The Charing Cross Eleanor of Castile	Charing Cross	1291 – c. 1294	Alexander Abingdon	Richard of Crundale and Roger of Crundale	Commemorative cross	—N/a	The costliest and most elaborate of the Eleanor crosses marking the sites where the Queen’s funeral cortège rested on the way to her burial at Westminster Abbey. The master mason Richard of Crundale died in 1293, after which the work was taken up by his brother Roger. The cross was destroyed under the orders of Parliament in 1647.
More images	The Cheapside Cross Eleanor of Castile	Cheapside	1291–1293	?	Michael of Canterbury	Commemorative cross	—N/a	Rebuilt in 1441, defaced in 1581 and 1600, and finally destroyed on 2 May 1643.
More images	Statue of Charles II trampling Cromwell	Stocks Market	17th century	?	?	Equestrian statue	Grade II	The figure on horseback originally represented the Polish king John Sobieski and the lower figure a defeated Turk. The sculpture was bought in 1675 by Sir Robert Vyner, who had the rider's head remodelled to portray Charles II. In 1739 it was removed for the construction of the Mansion House; since 1883 it has stood outside Newby Hall, Yorkshire.
	Statue of George I	Leicester Square	c. 1722	John Nost the Elder	—N/a	Equestrian statue	—N/a	A gilded lead replica of Nost's bronze equestrian statue, erected in Dublin in 1722 and now outside the Barber Institute, Birmingham. The horse was cast from Hubert Le Sueur's Charles I at Charing Cross. Purchased at the Cannons sale of 1747 and installed in the Square the following year. From the 1780s the statue was neglected and frequently vandalised; by the late nineteenth century only the horse remained, which was sold for £16.
	Statue of George I	Grosvenor Square	c. 1722	John Nost the Elder	—N/a	Equestrian statue	—N/a	Also of lead, this was probably from the same model as the Leicester Square statue. Bought from Nost's workshop by Sir Richard Grosvenor in 1725.
	Statue of Prince William, Duke of Cumberland	Cavendish Square	1770	Sir Henry Cheere, 1st Baronet	—N/a	Equestrian statue	—N/a	Cheere produced a bronzed lead statuette of the Duke of Cumberland (now in the National Army Museum) in around 1745. In 1770 a full-scale statue differing slightly from this model was erected in Cavendish Square; it was removed in 1868 and melted down. In the summer of 2012 a replica made of soap by the Korean artist Meekyoung Shin was installed on the plinth (still in situ) and allowed to erode over the course of a year. The display was later extended by a further six months to the end of 2013 and other versions were installed in the grounds of the South Korean National Museum of Contemporary Art and at MoCA Taipei.
	Isis and Osiris	Façade of the Egyptian Hall, Piccadilly; later on the Bastion High Walk, London Wall, outside the Museum of London	1811	Lawrence Gahagan	William Bullock (original setting)	Statues	—N/a	The Egyptian Hall was demolished in 1905. The figures were installed outside the Museum of London in 1994, but are in storage as of 2023.
More images	Statue of Robert Milligan	Museum of London Docklands, Hertsmere Road	1813	Richard Westmacott	—N/a	Statue	—N/a	Originally placed within the Hibbert Gate, immediately south of the entrance of the West India Docks office. Moved in 1875 to the top of the central gate pier at the West India Dock Road entrance, which was dismantled in 1943. Restored to its original position in 1997. Removed in 2020 in response to Black Lives Matter protests.
	The King's Cross George IV	Kings Cross 51.5307°N 0.1215°W	1836	?	Stephen Geary	Memorial with sculptures	—N/a	Intended as a national memorial to George IV, this structure gave its name to the district of Kings Cross. It was much criticised and was demolished in 1845.
	Figurehead from HMS Britomart	Above door of 3 Station Approach, near Kew Gardens station	1840s	unknown	—N/a	Architectural sculpture	—N/a	The figurehead was installed above the shop in 1960 by its owner, Ian Sheridan, a descendant of the playwright Richard Brinsley Sheridan. He had salvaged it from the wreckage of the ship after it was destroyed by fire in the 1930s. In the 2000s, after the shop changed hands, the figurehead was removed.
More images	Statue of Arthur Wellesley, 1st Duke of Wellington	Wellington Arch, Hyde Park Corner	1840–1846	Matthew Cotes Wyatt	Decimus Burton	Equestrian statue	Grade II	Wyatt's statue was installed on the Wellington Arch on 30 September 1846. It was regarded as a failure on aesthetic grounds and its gigantic size‍—‌30 ft high and 26 ft wide‍—‌was felt to be excessive for the commemoration of a single individual. It was removed to the military town of Aldershot, Hampshire, when the arch’s orientation was changed in 1883.
	Britannia with Supporters	Euston railway station	1849	John Thomas		Architectural sculpture	—N/a	Formerly in the station's Great Hall, over the door to the general meeting room; subsequently displayed in the station's restaurant from 1962 to 1986. Now in the National Railway Museum in York.
More images	Obelisk	Outside St Mary Woolnoth	Mid-19th century	?	—N/a	Obelisk	Grade II	Brought to Swanage, Dorset, by George Burt, and re-erected at Ballard Down overlooking that town in 1892.
More images	The Eagle Slayer	Outside the Victoria and Albert Museum until 1927; outside the V&A's branch in Bethnal Green until 2004	c. 1851, after an original of 1837	John Bell	—N/a	Statue	Grade II	Cast-iron statue originally displayed at the Great Exhibition of 1851. On long-term loan to the Coalbrookdale Museum of Iron (where the statue was made) in Ironbridge, Shropshire, since 2017.
More images	Statue of George Stephenson	Euston railway station	1852	Edward Hodges Baily		Statue	—N/a	The statue stood at the foot of the staircase in the Victorian station's Great Hall, which was demolished in 1961; it is now in the National Railway Museum in York.
	Statue of James McGrigor	Atterbury Street, Millbank (1909–2003)	1865	Matthew Noble	—N/a	Statue	Grade II	Unveiled 18 November 1865 at the Royal Hospital, Chelsea. Moved in 1909 to the newly built Royal Army Medical College, which became the Chelsea College of Arts in 2003. The statue was then relocated to the Royal Military Academy, Sandhurst.
	Bust of William Hogarth	Leicester Square	1874	Joseph Durham	James Knowles	Bust	Grade II	One of four busts of historical residents of the area, installed as part of Knowles's redesign of the gardens, which were removed in 2010–2012. This bust originally stood in the south-eastern corner of the square, near where Hogarth had a house from 1733 until his death in 1764, but moved to the north-east in the 1989–1992 refurbishment of the square.
	Bust of John Hunter	Leicester Square	1874	Thomas Woolner	James Knowles	Bust	Grade II	Hunter lived at 28 Leicester Square from 1783 to 1793. Albert Grant, the owner of Leicester Square in 1874, originally commissioned Woolner to sculpt a bust of Samuel Johnson, who frequented Reynolds's house on the square (q.v.). Grant was, however, persuaded by the Royal College of Surgeons to honour Hunter instead. The bust originally stood in the north-eastern corner of the square but changed places with the bust of Hogarth in the south-east when the square was refurbished in 1989–1992.
	Bust of Isaac Newton	Leicester Square	1874	William Calder Marshall	James Knowles	Bust	Grade II	Newton lived nearby, on 35 St Martin's Street, from 1710 to 1725. The bust was formerly in the south-western corner of the gardens.
	Bust of Joshua Reynolds	Leicester Square	1874	Henry Weekes	James Knowles	Bust	Grade II	Formerly stood in the north-western corner of the gardens, a site close to 47 Leicester Square, where Reynolds lived from 1760 until his death in 1792.
	Poets' Fountain Geoffrey Chaucer, William Shakespeare and John Milton	Hamilton Place	1875	Thomas Thornycroft	—N/a	Fountain with sculptures	—N/a	Inaugurated 9 July 1875. A multi-figure composition including figures of the Muses and statues of the three poets crowned with a personification of Fame; all but the last of these have been lost since the fountain was dismantled in 1948, having sustained bomb damage in World War II.
	Afghan and Zulu War Memorial	Repository Road, Woolwich 51.4824°N 0.0545°E	1881/3?	Count Gleichen	—N/a	Megalithoid with sculpture	Grade II	Moved to Larkhill Garrison, Wiltshire, at some point after October 2008.
	Statue of Napoléon, Prince Imperial	Royal Military Academy, Woolwich	1883	Count Gleichen	—N/a	Statue	Grade II	Unveiled 13 January 1883; now at the Royal Military Academy, Sandhurst.
	Memorial to Henry Fawcett	Vauxhall Park	1893	George Tinworth	—N/a	Sculptural group	—N/a	Unveiled 7 June 1893. The terracotta sculpture, situated close by Fawcett's home, was a gift from the pottery manufacturer Henry Doulton. Removed and destroyed in 1955.
	Statue of Hugh Rose, 1st Baron Strathnairn	Intersection of Knightsbridge and Brompton Road	1895	Edward Onslow Ford	—N/a	Equestrian statue	—N/a	Unveiled 19 June 1895 by the Duke of Grafton. Cast from guns taken during the Indian Mutiny, of which Strathnairn was one of the main suppressors. Taken down in 1931 during work on a new subway for Knightsbridge tube station and kept in storage until it was sold by Westminster Council in 1964, it now stands in Liphook, Hampshire.
More images	Mrs Woodford Fawcett Memorial Drinking Fountain	Outside West Norwood Cemetery	1899	?	—N/a	Drinking fountain	—N/a	Amelia Fawcett (d. 1899) was a local temperance campaigner. The drinking fountain erected in her memory was demolished in a car accident on 13 October 2024.
	Statue of Queen Victoria	Doulton (from 1901, Royal Doulton) pottery works, Albert Embankment	1900	John Broad	—N/a	Statue	—N/a	The terracotta statue stood at this site until 1910, when it was removed for roadworks and destroyed. Other statues from the same mould went to Newbury and Gravesend.
	Statue of Queen Victoria	Royal Military Academy, Woolwich	1904	Henry Price	—N/a	Statue	Grade II	Moved to the Royal Military Academy, Sandhurst, in 1947.
More images	Pearl Assurance War Memorial	Pearl Assurance head offices, 247–252 High Holborn	1919	George Frampton	—N/a	War memorial	Grade II*	Unveiled 4 July 1921. A standing figure of Saint George, similar to Frampton's design for Maidstone War Memorial. Moved to the Pearl Centre, the company's new headquarters in Peterborough, in 1991.
	Bust of Haile Selassie	Cannizaro Park, Wimbledon	1936	Hilda Seligman	—N/a	Bust	—N/a	Destroyed by protesters on 30 June 2020. Despite occurring in the aftermath of the murder of George Floyd, the vandalism was linked to unrest in Ethiopia and persecution of the Oromo people.
	La Belle Sauvage Pocahontas	Red Lion Square	1956	David McFall	—N/a	Statue	—N/a	A recumbent nude statue of Pocahontas. Commissioned by the publisher Cassell and based on that firm's colophon, which referred to its originally having been based near Ludgate Hill where Pocantontas had once lived. (See the article Bell Savage Inn.) This was later removed to Greycoat Place, Victoria, and then to Villiers House, Strand. It is thought to have been sold at auction in 1996.
	Girls Playing Netball	Barnsbury (Girls) Secondary School, Islington	1958	Trevor Tennant	—N/a	Sculptural group	—N/a	Missing since 1999, when the part of the school where the sculpture was located was sold off.
	Meridian	State House, High Holborn	1958–1960	Barbara Hepworth	—N/a	Sculpture	—N/a	The work was commissioned for the site. In 1990 State House was demolished and Meridian was bought for the Donald M. Kendall Sculpture Gardens at the international headquarters of PepsiCo in Purchase, New York
	Cock	Crown Woods School, Eltham	1959	Bernard Meadows	—N/a	Sculpture	—N/a	Sold at auction in 2004.
	The Watchers	University of Roehampton	1960	Lynn Chadwick	—N/a	Sculptural group	Grade II	In 2006 one of the three figures was stolen.
	Faun with Goose	Sarel House, Tower Hamlets	1960	Georg Ehrlich	—N/a	Sculpture	—N/a	The sculptor's first commission from the London County Council, this work went missing during redevelopment of the site in the early 2000s.
	Birdman	Sedgehill School, Lewisham	1960	Elisabeth Frink	—N/a	Statue	—N/a	
	Birds in Flight	Elm Court School, Tulse Hill	1960	Heinz Henghes	—N/a	Sculpture	—N/a	The sculpture, designed to be suitable for children to handle, was stolen from the school shortly after it was unveiled.
More images	Statue of Robert Baden-Powell, 1st Baron Baden-Powell	Baden-Powell House, South Kensington (1961–2021); Gilwell Park, Essex (2021–present) 51.4956°N 0.1793°W	1961	Don Potter		Statue	—N/a	After the Scout Association moved out of Baden-Powell House in summer 2021, the statue of its founder was re-sited in front of the association's headquarters at Gilwell Park.
	Drinking Calf	Garratt Green School, Wandsworth	1961	Georg Ehrlich	—N/a	Sculpture	—N/a	
	The Swans	Ashburton Estate, Wandsworth	1961	Gertrude Hermes	—N/a	Sculptural group	—N/a	Stolen in the 1980s.
	Mother and Child	Sydenham Hill Estate	1961	Karin Jonzen	—N/a	Statue	—N/a	A commission by the London County Council, situated outside the estate's community centre, where a mother and baby clinic was held. In 1970 the work was reported stolen.
	Neighbourly Encounter	Silverwood Estate, Southwark	1961	Uli Nimptsch	—N/a	Sculpture	—N/a	First exhibited at the Royal Academy Summer Exhibition, the work disappeared soon after its installation on the estate.
More images	Stag	Stag Place, now Cardinal Place, Victoria	1963	Edward Bainbridge Copnall	Howard, Fairbairn & Partners	Sculpture	—N/a	A late addition to the complex, the sculpture was intended to recall the Stag Brewery which had stood on the site. Removed in 1997 to the Kent Millennium River Walk, Maidstone.
More images	Fountains	Centre Point	1963	Jupp Dernbach-Mayen	Richard Seifert and Partners	Fountains	Grade II	Inspired by fountains the sculptor had seen at the Alhambra in Granada. Removed in 2009 when the plaza in front of Centre Point was pedestrianised as part of construction work for Crossrail. The fountains were given to the Architectural Association for installation at Hooke Park, the AA's school for rural architecture in Dorset.
	A Boy on a Dolphin	Roupell Court Old People's Home, Lambeth	1963	Uli Nimptsch	—N/a	Bas-relief	—N/a	
	Relief sculpture	Northern Polytechnic Institute (now London Metropolitan University), Holloway Road, Islington	1964	William Mitchell		Relief sculpture	—N/a	Demolished in 2004. London Metropolitan University's Graduate School, designed by Daniel Libeskind, now stands on the site.
	Sun terrace	Hampstead Civic Centre	1964	William Mitchell	Basil Spence	Sculpted concrete sun terrace	—N/a	Demolished in 2002.
	Bolted Flat	Lollard School, Southwark	1966	John Hoskin		Sculpture	—N/a	Dismantled in the late 1980s or early 1990s.
	Two Forms (Divided Circle)	Dulwich Park	1969	Barbara Hepworth	—N/a	Sculpture	—N/a	Stolen in December 2011.
	Neon Tower	Roof of the Hayward Gallery	1972	Philip Vaughan	—N/a	Sculpture	—N/a	The sculpture stood in situ from 1972 to 2008, when it was taken down for renovation. Although the gallery has stated that it was originally commissioned as a temporary installation, the artist has disputed this and called for the work to be reinstated permanently.
	The Towers of Hackney		1970s – 2009		—N/a		—N/a	
	Fallow Buck	Coombe Road, Kingston upon Thames	1981	David Wynne	—N/a	Statue	—N/a	Stolen in 2009 and never recovered.
	Techtonic II	Opposite the entrance to Tower Three, London School of Economics	1984	Haydn Llewellyn Davies	—N/a	Sculpture	—N/a	Part of Louis Odette's 2005 bequest of sculptures to the LSE. As of 2013 the sculpture is no longer at this location.
	The Leopard	Outside 20 Cannon Street; from 2009, Station Approach, Leatherhead, Surrey	1985	Jonathan Kenworthy		Sculpture	—N/a	Commissioned by Wates, the developers of 20 Cannon Street. Relocated to that company's headquarters in 2009.
	Gates	111 Buckingham Palace Road 51°29′43″N 0°08′45″W	1986	Giuseppe Lund	—N/a	Gates	—N/a	Gates of jagged aluminium. As of 2017 they are no longer at this location.
More images	The Artist as Hephaestus	34–36 High Holborn	1987	Eduardo Paolozzi	—N/a	Statue	—N/a	Commissioned by the London and Paris Property Group for the site, which was the front façade of their new offices. The plaster and polystyrene model for the statue, which is a self-portrait, is in the National Portrait Gallery. Sold at auction by Bonhams in 2012.
	Statues of Gary Glitter, Jimi Hendrix, Buddy Holly, Michael Jackson, Mick Jagger, Elton John, Annie Lennox, Madonna and Diana Ross	Rock Circus (the London Pavilion), Piccadilly Circus	c. 1989	James Butler		Statues		
	Chalice	123 Buckingham Palace Road 51.4931°N 0.1465°W	1991	William Pye	—N/a	Fountain	—N/a	Unveiled 24 June 1991. A stainless steel basin, its circumference bounded by cables suspended from above which defined a cylindrical shape in the air. The idea was suggested to Pye by the hanging lamps in the Sultan Hassan Mosque in Cairo. Dismantled in 2017 when the shopping centre was demolished, and returned to the sculptor.
	Subway murals	Elephant and Castle roundabout	1991–1994	David Bratby and others		Murals	—N/a	Destroyed c. 2013.
	Statue of John Cass	Sir John Cass's Foundation, 31 Jewry Street	1998	After Louis-François Roubiliac	A. W. Cooksey	Statue	Grade II*	This replica, one of several made to mark the foundation's 250th anniversary, stood in the niche once occupied by Roubiliac's original. (See below.) In 2020 it was removed in response to Black Lives Matter protests.
	Under Circumstances	Outside 20 Manchester Square 51.5170°N 0.1535°W	1999	Tony Cragg	—N/a	Sculpture	—N/a	Part of a series of works by the sculptor called Rational Beings, created by following the contours of a drawn line with stacked circles of polystyrene. Here the resulting three-dimensional shape was carved in Belgian granite. Removed c. 2016.
	The Climber	On roof of 43–45 Notting Hill Gate	2000	Peter Logan		Kinetic architectural sculpture	—N/a	All the moving parts of the sculpture had to be removed in 2013 after a piece collapsed and fell onto the pavement on 22 June that year. Removed completely c. 2018.
More images	Statue of Terence Cuneo	London Waterloo station	2004	Philip Jackson	—N/a	Statue	—N/a	
More images	One Nation Under CCTV	Newman Street, Fitzrovia	2008	Banksy	—N/a	Mural	—N/a	To produce this work Banksy erected and dismantled three storeys of scaffolding without being observed, despite the site being behind a tall fence and in full view of a CCTV camera. Westminster City Council destroyed the work as an example to graffiti artists.
	Statue of Michael Jackson	Craven Cottage, Fulham	2011	?	—N/a	Statue	—N/a	In 2014 the statue was moved to the National Football Museum in Manchester.
	Alien	Grosvenor Gardens, Westminster	2012	David Breuer-Weil	—N/a	Sculpture	—N/a	In 2015 the sculpture was moved to the National Trust property of Mottisfont in Hampshire.
More images	Paleys upon Pilers	Aldgate	2012	Studio Weave	—N/a	Sculpture	—N/a	Installed for the 2012 Olympics, inspired by two poems by Geoffrey Chaucer who lived in Aldgate. Dismantled in 2015.
More images	Statue of Robert Stephenson	Euston railway station	1871	Carlo Marochetti	—N/a	Statue	Grade II	Removed in October 2020 for construction of High Speed 2. Placed on display in April 2025 at Locomotion Museum in Shildon, County Durham, where it is expected to remain for ten years before returning to Euston.
More images	London Booster	Business Design Centre, Islington	2012	David Černý	—N/a	Sculpture	—N/a	A London double-decker bus with hydraulic arms which could do push-ups. Installed for the 2012 Summer Olympics outside the Business Design Centre, Islington, which was used as "Czech House" for the games. Following the games it was moved to Prague.
	Statue of Teddy Baldock	Langdon Park, Poplar 51.5155°N 0.0137°W	2014	Carl Payne	—N/a	Statue	—N/a	Unveiled 15 May 2014. Known as the "Pride of Poplar", the boxer grew up nearby on Byron Street. The statue was stolen on 1 February 2026.
More images	A Bullet from a Shooting Star	Greenwich Peninsula	2015	Alex Chinneck	—N/a	Sculpture	—N/a	Part of The Line art trail. Removed in July 2025.

- Prior to the installation of the present statue of Oliver Cromwell in Parliament Square there was a different statue of Cromwell in another part of the square. It looked very similar to the one by Matthew Noble currently in Wythenshawe, Manchester, but it is not clear whether this is the same statue or one is a copy of the other.

== Works replaced by replicas ==
Image	Title / subject	Location and coordinates	Date	Artist / designer	Architect / other	Type	Designation	Notes
More images	Seven Dials column	Seven Dials, Covent Garden	1693–1694	Edward Pierce	?	Column	—N/a	The original column was removed in 1773. It was re-erected in Weybridge in 1820 as a memorial to Frederica, Duchess of York, where it is Grade II listed. A replica was unveiled at Seven Dials in 1989.
	Statue of Queen Anne	St Paul's Churchyard	1712	Francis Bird	?	Statue group	Grade II*	The statue which stood outside St Paul's Cathedral was damaged by repeated attacks in the 19th century, and as it was in any case in rather poor condition, it was removed in 1885 together with the four statues at its base, and replaced by a copy, partly the work of Richard Claude Belt. The original was moved to a location near Hastings in Sussex.
	Statue of Robert Geffrye	Geffrye Almshouses (now the Museum of the Home), Shoreditch	c. 1724	John Nost	?	Statue in niche	—N/a	Geffrye's will provided for the creation of the almshouses; Nost's statue and the residents alike moved out to Mottingham in 1912. The replica (pictured) was installed that year, before the building opened as a museum in 1914.
More images	Statue of Hans Sloane	Chelsea Physic Garden	1732–1737	John Michael Rysbrack	—N/a	Statue	—N/a	Commissioned in 1732, installed in a greenhouse in 1737 and moved to the centre of the garden in 1748. The statue deteriorated over time and was moved to the British Museum in 1983. A fibreglass replica was installed in its place; this too deteriorated and was replaced by a copy made of jesmonite. That in turn was replaced in 2014 by a copy in Portland stone.
More images	Statue of John Cass	Aldgate High Street (1751–1869); Jewry Street (1869–c. 1919)	1751	Louis-François Roubiliac	A. W. Cooksey (final outdoor setting)	Statue	—N/a	Originally stood in a niche at the school funded by Cass (today The Aldgate School, and relocated). The statue was moved to premises on Jewry Street in 1869, which were rebuilt in 1898–1901. Moved indoors by 1919. In 1980 it was put on permanent loan to the Guildhall. A replica stood in the niche at Jewry Street from 1998 to 2020. (See above.)
	Sculptures and friezes on Grand Hall entrance	Olympia	1886	?	?	Sculptures and friezes	—N/a	Featured sculptures of Demeter, Triptolemus, and Persephone, related to the original use as the National Agricultural Hall. Removed in the mid-20th century, and replaced by replicas in 2026 as part of Olympia's redevelopment.
More images	Statue of Anna Pavlova	Victoria Palace Theatre	1911	Frank Matcham (possibly)	—N/a	Statue		Gilded statue of the ballerina Anna Pavlova on the dome of the theatre. Taken down to protect it from bombing during World War II, and mislaid as a result. A replica (pictured) was installed in 2006.
	Woman with Fish	Cleveland Estate, Tower Hamlets (original); Millwall Park (replica, pictured)	1959	Frank Dobson	—N/a	Sculpture	—N/a	
More images	Dr Salter's Daydream Alfred Salter	Cherry Gardens, Bermondsey 51.50061°N 0.05973°W	2014	Diane Gorvin	—N/a	Sculptures	—N/a	The seated statue of Alfred Salter was stolen in 2011, after which the figures of his daughter Joyce and her cat were taken into safekeeping by Southwark Council. The new work includes an additional sculpture portraying Salter's wife, Ada.

== Works removed and subsequently returned ==
- The statue of Charles II in Soho Square was removed for many years to Grim's Dyke, the estate of W. S. Gilbert, and returned to its current position after the death of Gilbert's widow, who had willed it back to the square. It was originally accompanied by four other statues representing British rivers, and the current whereabouts of these is unknown; they have probably been destroyed or buried.
- The Temple Bar Gate by Christopher Wren with its associated statues was removed from its original location at Temple Bar in 1878. It was re-erected at Theobalds Park in Hertfordshire. In 2004 the gate was installed at a new location in the City of London, forming an entrance to the Paternoster Square development.

== See also ==
- Actions against memorials in the United Kingdom during the George Floyd protests
- List of demolished buildings and structures in London
- Lost artworks
- Works by Banksy that have been damaged or destroyed

== Bibliography ==
- Blackwood, John (1989). London's Immortals: The Complete Outdoor Commemorative Statues. London and Oxford: Savoy Press.
- Bradley, Simon; Pevsner, Nikolaus (2003). London 6: Westminster. The Buildings of England. London and New Haven: Yale University Press. ISBN 978-0-300-09595-1.
- Cavanagh, Terry (2023). Public Sculpture of Kensington and Chelsea with Westminster South-West. Public Sculpture of Britain. Vol. 22. Watford: Public Statues and Sculpture Association. ISBN 978-1-8383976-2-3.
- Matthews, Peter (2018). London's Statues and Monuments. Oxford: Shire Publications.
- Ward-Jackson, Philip (2003). Public Sculpture of the City of London. Public Sculpture of Britain. Liverpool: Liverpool University Press.
- Ward-Jackson, Philip (2011). Public Sculpture of Historic Westminster: Volume 1. Public Sculpture of Britain. Liverpool: Liverpool University Press.
