= Meekyoung Shin =

South Korean sculptor (born 1967)

- Born: 1967 (age 58–59); Cheongju, South Korea
- Education: Seoul National University, Slade School of Fine Art, Royal College of Art
- Alma mater: Seoul National University
- Known for: Soap carved sculptures in Greco-Roman, Chinese, and Korean styles
- Notable work: Written in Soap: A Plinth Project, Translation Series, Toilet Project (Toilet Bodhisattva), Crouching Aphrodite
- Style: Sculpture, soap carving
- Website: https://www.meekyoungshin.com/

Meekyoung Shin (Korean: 신미경; b. 1967) is a South Korean sculptor who specializes in soap carving and other diverse mediums to create statues and other objects in Greco-Roman, Korean, and Chinese styles.

== Early life and education ==
Born in Cheongju, South Korea in 1967, She completed her Bachelor of Fine Arts (BFA) in Sculpture in 1990 and her Master of Fine Arts (MFA) in Sculpture in 1993 at Seoul National University.In 1995, she moved to London, where she earned a second MFA in Sculpture from the Slade School of Fine Art at University College London. She later pursued a Master’s degree in Glass and Ceramics at the Royal College of Art, graduating in 2017. Her education, encompassing both Eastern and Western traditions, has played a significant role in shaping her innovative approach to materials and themes of cultural translation in her artwork.

== Style ==
The size of her work ranges from handheld size to towering sculptures, with one of her sculptures utilizing 50,000 bars of soap. Her methods include using plaster to cast elements, and then sculpting with replications of Greco-Roman sculpture styles, Chinese ceramic styles, or Korean ceramic styles, while challenging traditional notions of stability and beauty. The material she uses is meant to call into question the nature of stability and the meaning in cultural contexts. The use of soap is meant to explore translation across cultures and the passage of time.

Her work is also sometimes painted, or formed with pieces missing to better evoke the cultures that the inspiration derives from. She additionally uses materials such as fragrance, pigments, varnish, gold leaf, resin, and acrylic in her work.

The use of scented soap is significant in her work as an added sensory experience in her exhibitions. In her exhibitions for Toilet Bodhisattva, she cast small versions of a Buddha statue so that the viewer may experience the same material used in the exhibition. For other Toilet Project works, she created statues of classical busts.

For other scented project, there is Written in Soap: A Plinth Project. A statue of Prince William, Duke of Cumberland was removed in 1868, then replicated by Shin in soap (initially in clay); the replication was installed on the same plinth in 2012 at Cavendish Square, and left exposed to the elements for over a year in the London rain until its removal in 2016. The statue, called Written in Soap: A Plinth Project, was meant to be there for a year, and the dissolution of the material is meant to refer to changing meaning of statues and changing perceptions of history. The soap was scented, vegetable-based, and had a skeletal support attached to the base holding the sculpture upright. This work has been cited in investigations into colonial legacy in public spaces.

She evoked Asian features on her 2002 statue Crouching Aphrodite by casting parts of herself to make sculptures, challenging classical standards of beauty.

== Notable Exhibitions ==
Her work has been exhibited at Princessehof Ceramics Museum, the National Centre for Craft & Design, Kukje Gallery, Art Basel, the Arko Art Center in Seoul, the Barakat Gallery, the Philadelphia Museum of Art, CR Collective in west Seoul, the Saatchi Gallery, the Wooyang Museum of Contemporary Art, the Mongin Art Center, and Haunch of Venison. Other versions of Written in Soap: A Plinth Project were also installed at the National Museum of Contemporary Art and at the Museum of Contemporary Art Taipei.

Notable Exhibitions:

- British Museum, London, UK (2007): Translation – Moon Jar. This exhibition marked an important moment in showcasing Shin’s reinterpretation of Korean cultural heritage within a Western museum context.
- Saatchi Gallery, London, UK (2010–2019): Exhibitions such as Fantastic Ordinary and Korean Eye highlighted Shin’s ability to integrate Eastern and Western aesthetics.
- National Museum of Modern and Contemporary Art, Gwacheon, South Korea (2013): Translation: The Epic Archive. This solo exhibition explored the reinterpretation of cultural objects displaced from their original contexts.
- State Hermitage Museum, Russia (2020): Between Creativity and Daydream. A group exhibition where Shin’s work symbolized the fluidity of cultural narratives.
- Philadelphia Museum of Art, USA (2023): The Shape of Time: Korean Art After 1989. This group exhibition contextualized Shin’s works within contemporary Korean art history.

Through these exhibitions, Shin continues to redefine the boundaries of cultural preservation and artistic innovation. Her works are celebrated for their sensory engagement and the unique interplay of traditional forms with ephemeral materials.

== Series and projects ==
- Toilet Project
- Translation – Ghost Series
- Translation – Glass Bottle Series
- Translation – Painting Series
- Translation – Vase Series
- Weathering Project
- Fragrance of History Series
- Written in Soap: A Plinth Project
- Crouching Aphrodite
- Ephemeral Monuments Theme

== Gallery ==
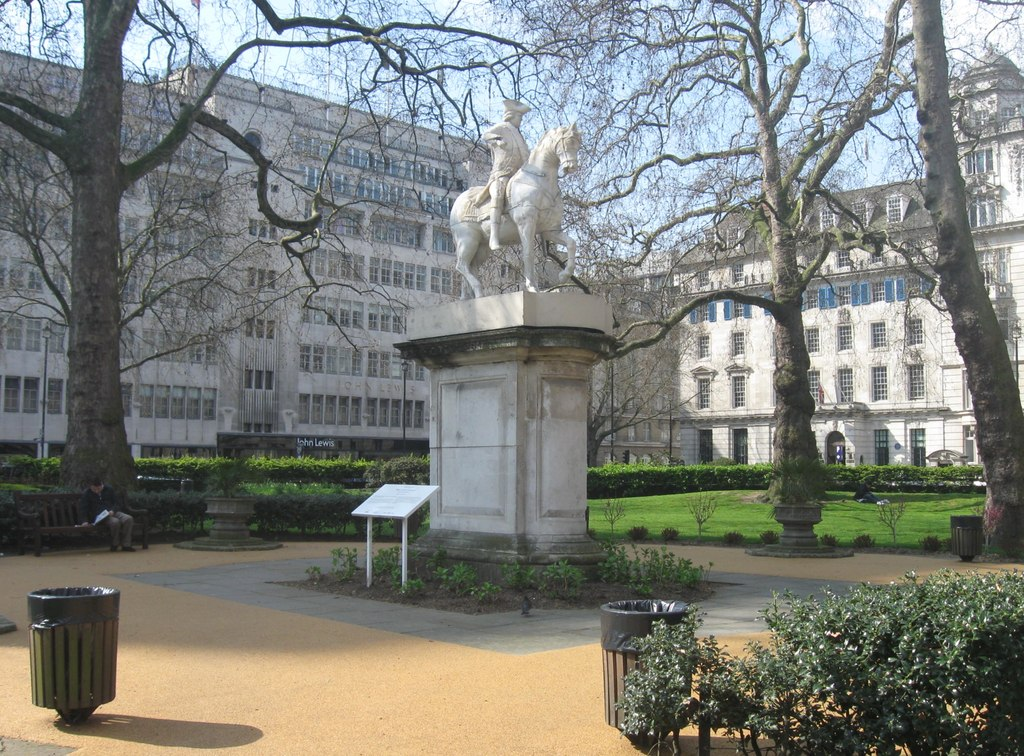
Photo of Written in Soap: A Plinth Project in 2013.

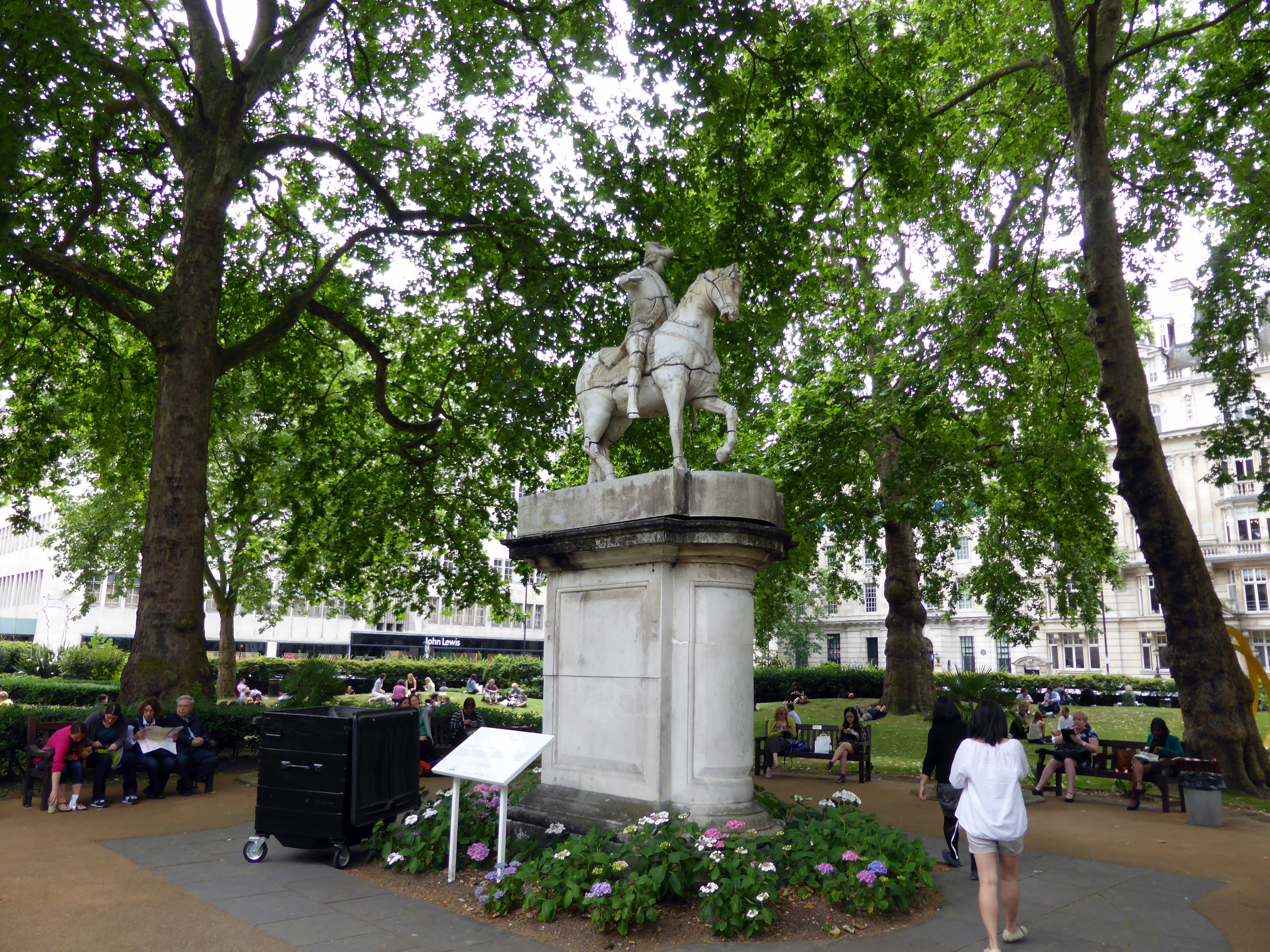
Photo of Written in Soap: A Plinth Project in 2014.
