= Mannequin =

Doll used in art and clothing display

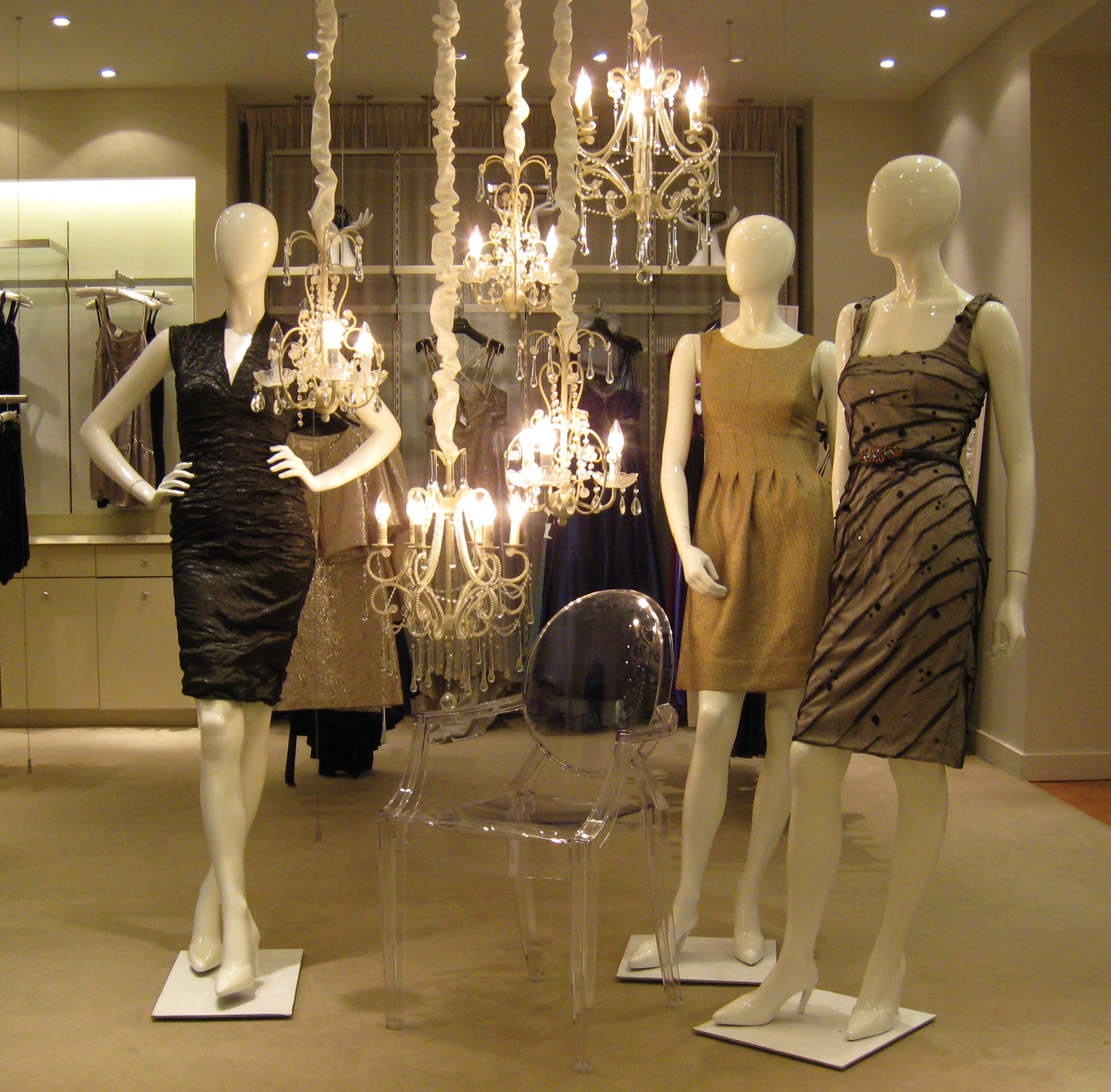
Mannequins in a clothing shop in Canada

A mannequin (sometimes spelled as manikin and also called a dummy, lay figure, or dress form) is a doll, often articulated, used by artists, tailors, dressmakers, window dressers and others, especially to display or fit clothing and show off different fabrics and textiles. Alternatively the term refers, or referred to, a live human fashion model.

Life-sized mannequins with simulated airways are used in the teaching of first aid, CPR, and advanced airway management skills such as tracheal intubation. During the 1950s, mannequins were used in nuclear tests to help show the effects of nuclear weapons on humans. Also referred to as mannequins are the human figures used in computer simulation to model the behavior of the human body.

== Etymology ==
Mannequin comes from the French word mannequin, which had acquired the meaning "an artist's jointed model", which in turn came from the Flemish word manneken, meaning "little man, figurine", referring to late Middle Ages practice in Flanders whereby public display of even women's clothes was performed by male pages (boys). Fashion shops in Paris ordered dolls in reed from Flemish merchants. Flanders was in terms of logistics the easiest region to import reed dolls from, as the rivers Schelde and Oise provided easy routes from Flanders to Paris. As the Flemish wrote 'manneke(n)' for 'little man' on their invoices, the Parisians pronounced this as 'mannequen', hence shifted to 'mannequin'. A mannequin is thus linguistically masculine, not feminine.

== Alternative meaning ==
The Oxford English Dictionary gives two meanings for the term, the first being "a person employed by a dressmaker, costumier, etc., to model clothes," the second being "a model of (part of) a human figure, used for the display of clothes, etc." In the late 1800s and first part of the twentieth century, British and Australian English borrowed 'mannequin' to refer to human, invariably female, fashion models such as Loulou de la Falaise (a meaning still retained in French and other European languages) and the 1926 American Mannequin silent romantic drama film uses that sense, which has become obsolete since in American English. The meaning as a shop dummy dates from the start of World War II. Australian academic Maynard notes the ironic or symbolic potential of the interchangeability of fashion models and mannequins as humans; and of mannikins, dummies, and dolls.

== History ==
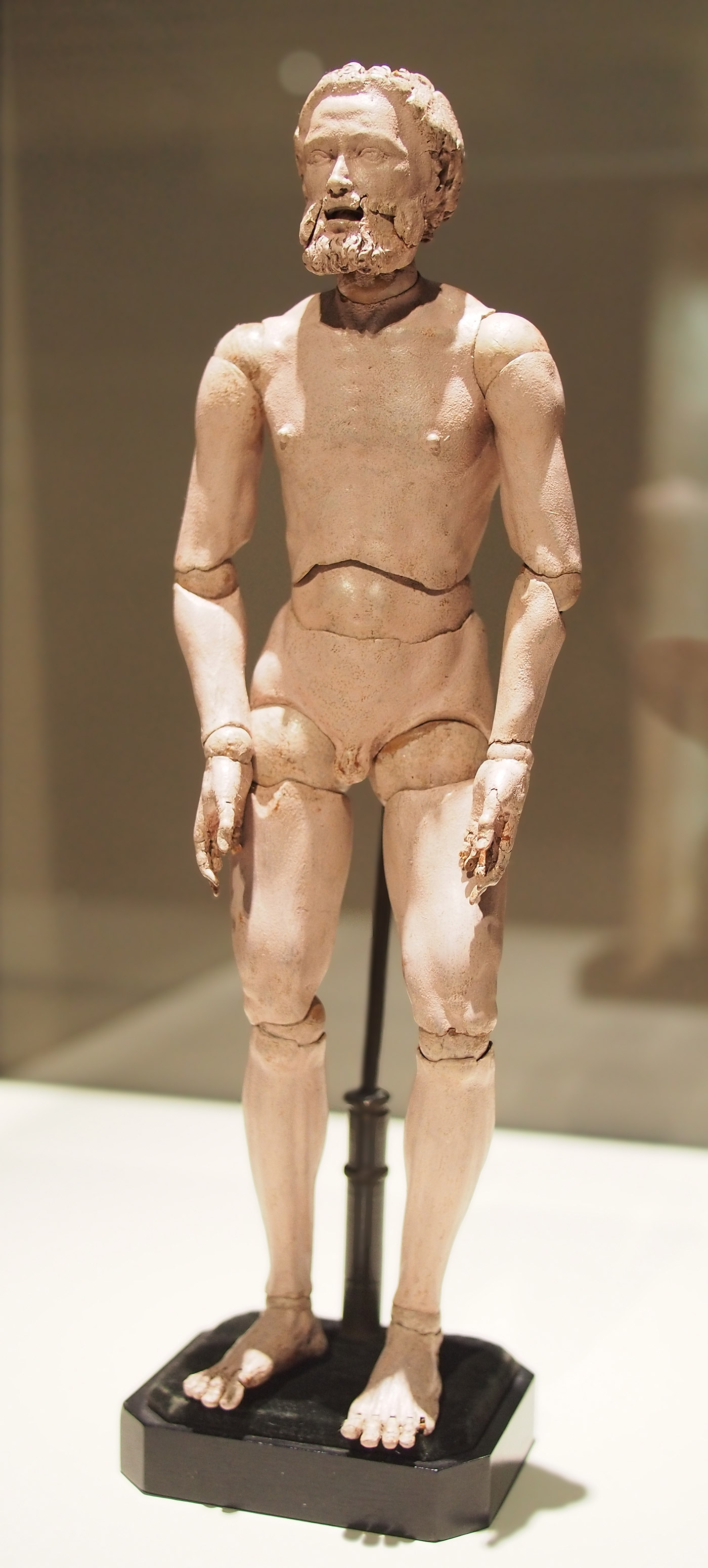
A lay figure by Albrecht Dürer in the Prado Museum

Shop mannequins are derived from dress forms used by fashion houses for dress making. The use of mannequins originated in the 15th century, when miniature "milliners' mannequins" were used to demonstrate fashions for customers. Full-scale, wickerwork mannequins came into use in the mid-18th century. Wirework mannequins were manufactured in Paris from 1835.

In nineteenth- and early twentieth-century haute couture, mannequin also named the living woman who wore garments for clients in the salon. Charles Frederick Worth is generally credited with institutionalising house mannequins after opening his Paris maison in 1858—his wife Marie modelled there into the 1870s and later trained the house figures—while by about 1900 most major Paris houses kept a cabine of full-time mannequins to show collections privately to customers and buyers. In London, Lady Duff Gordon (trading as Lucile) staged theatrical “mannequin parades” from around 1900, training tall models in deportment, giving them stage names, and having them strike dramatic poses while barely smiling or speaking.

== Shop display ==
The first female mannequins, made of papier-mâché, were made in France in the mid-19th century. Mannequins were later made of wax to produce a more lifelike appearance. In the 1920s, wax was supplanted by a more durable composite made with plaster.

Retailers also used living people in windows as publicity. From the 1890s through the 1920s and early 1930s, department stores in Europe and the United States sometimes placed women in display windows made up to resemble inanimate mannequins—mimicking their poses beside the dummies, or appearing and vanishing as “statue” figures in changing millinery and accessory tableaux—stunts that could draw sidewalk crowds large enough to disrupt traffic. Seasonal “living model” window exhibitions were likewise advertised by city merchants (for example during Portland’s 1916 Styles Exhibit).

From the mid-nineteenth century, display mannequins were often made as lifelike as possible: in France, Professor Lavigne and his student Fred Stockman developed wax heads and hands with individual hairs and glass eyes, and in the 1930s American designer Lester Gaba produced celebrity-like figures, including the plaster mannequin Cynthia, promoted as nearly indistinguishable from a dressed woman. Parallel to that realism, especially from the 1920s, manufacturers also experimented with stylized and partly faceless forms—the French firm Siégel & Stockman, advised by René Herbst, made the figure an icon of the moderne, and designers modelled abstracted features—while by the late 1920s “stylized” mannequins with erased facial detail and metallic finishes challenged purely naturalistic types. French advertising theory of the period held that facelessness was necessary for the effective display of haute couture, and these stylized figures were meant to divert attention from the body to the clothes it wore. In the 1960s Adel Rootstein reacted against the stiff, featureless “clothes peg” dummies still common in shops by modelling fibreglass figures on living fashion personalities (including Twiggy and Sandie Shaw in 1966); later in the century, especially by the 1990s, many retailers again favoured abstract, featureless or headless forms based only loosely on the human body.

Modern day mannequins are made from a variety of materials, the primary ones being fiberglass and plastic. The fiberglass mannequins are usually more expensive than the plastic ones, tend to be not as durable, but are significantly more realistic. Plastic mannequins, on the other hand, are a relatively new innovation in the mannequin field and are built to withstand the hustle of customer foot traffic usually witnessed in the store they are placed in.

Mannequins are used primarily by retail stores as in-store displays or window decoration. However, many online sellers also use them to display their products for their product photos (as opposed to using a live model).

From 2017 Balenciaga, under Demna, featured installations by the sculptor Mark Jenkins, using hyperrealistic figures in place of conventional mannequins, in its store windows from Colette in Paris to Selfridges in London. Its New York flagship, opened in 2019, used mannequins made from 3D scans of the brand's own runway models.

== Use by artists ==
Renaissance artist Fra Bartolomeo invented the full-scale articulated mannequin (more properly known as lay figure) as an aid in drawing and painting draped figures. In 18th-century England, lay-figures are known to have been owned by portrait painters such as Joshua Reynolds, Thomas Gainsborough, and Arthur Devis for the arrangement of conversation pieces.

== Medical education ==
In healthcare simulation, the preferred spelling is manikin. Anatomical models such as ivory manikins were used by doctors in the 17th century to study medical anatomy and as a teaching aid for pregnancy and childbirth. Each figure could be opened up to reveal internal organs and sometimes fetuses. There are only 180 known surviving ancient medical manikins worldwide.

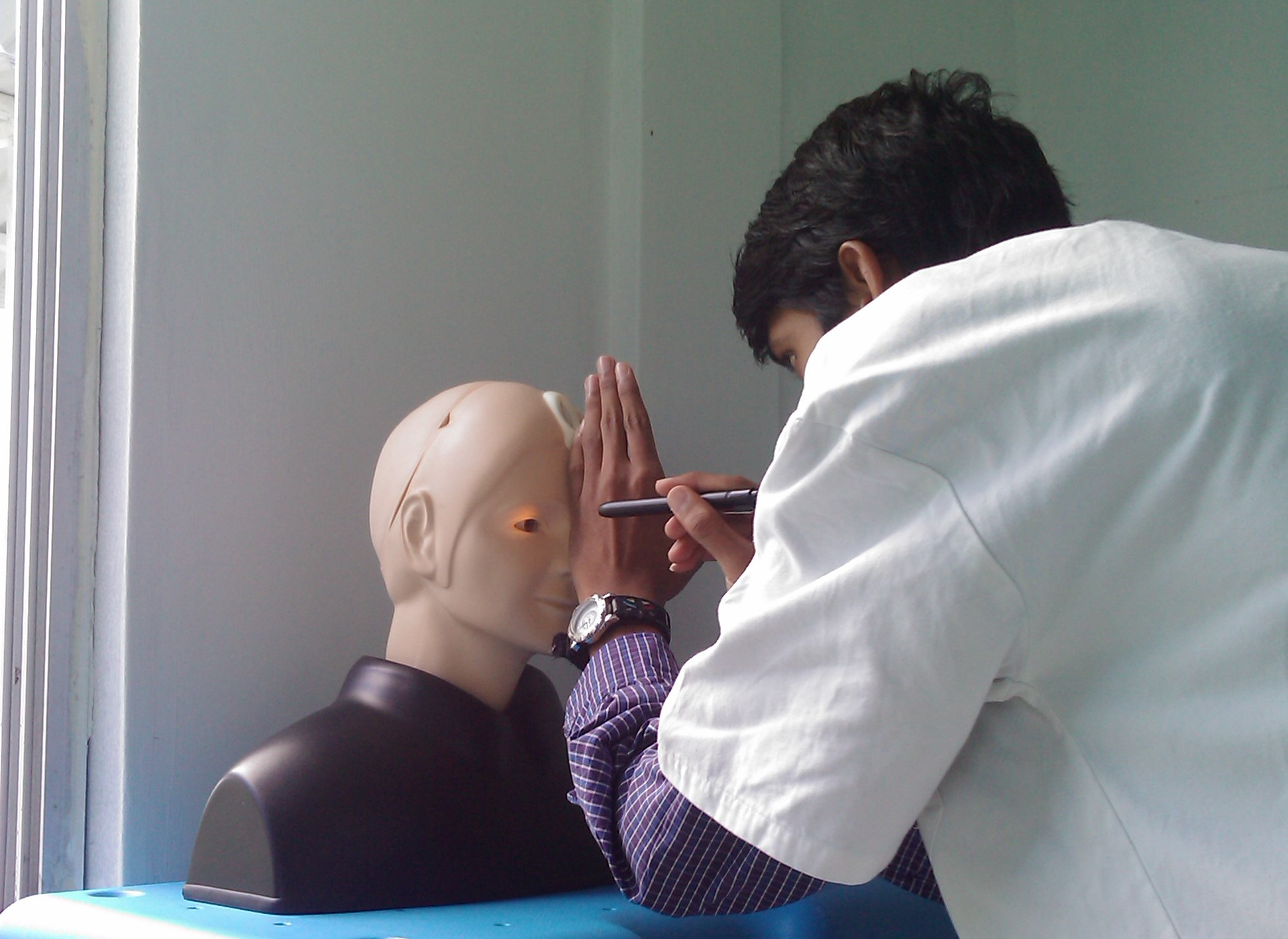
A medical student performs an eye examination on a manikin in Mauritius

Today, medical simulation manikins, models or related artefacts such as SimMan, the Transparent Anatomical Manikin or Harvey are widely used in medical education. The term manikin refers exclusively to these types of models, though mannequin is often also used.

In first aid courses, manikins may be used to demonstrate methods of giving first aid (e.g., resuscitation). Fire and coastguard services use manikins to practice life-saving procedures. The manikins have similar weight distribution to a human. Special obese manikins and horse manikins have also been made for similar purposes.

Over-reliance on mass-produced manikins has been criticized for teaching medical students a hypothetical "average" that does not help them identify or understand the significant amount of normal variation seen in the real world.

== Representation in art and culture ==
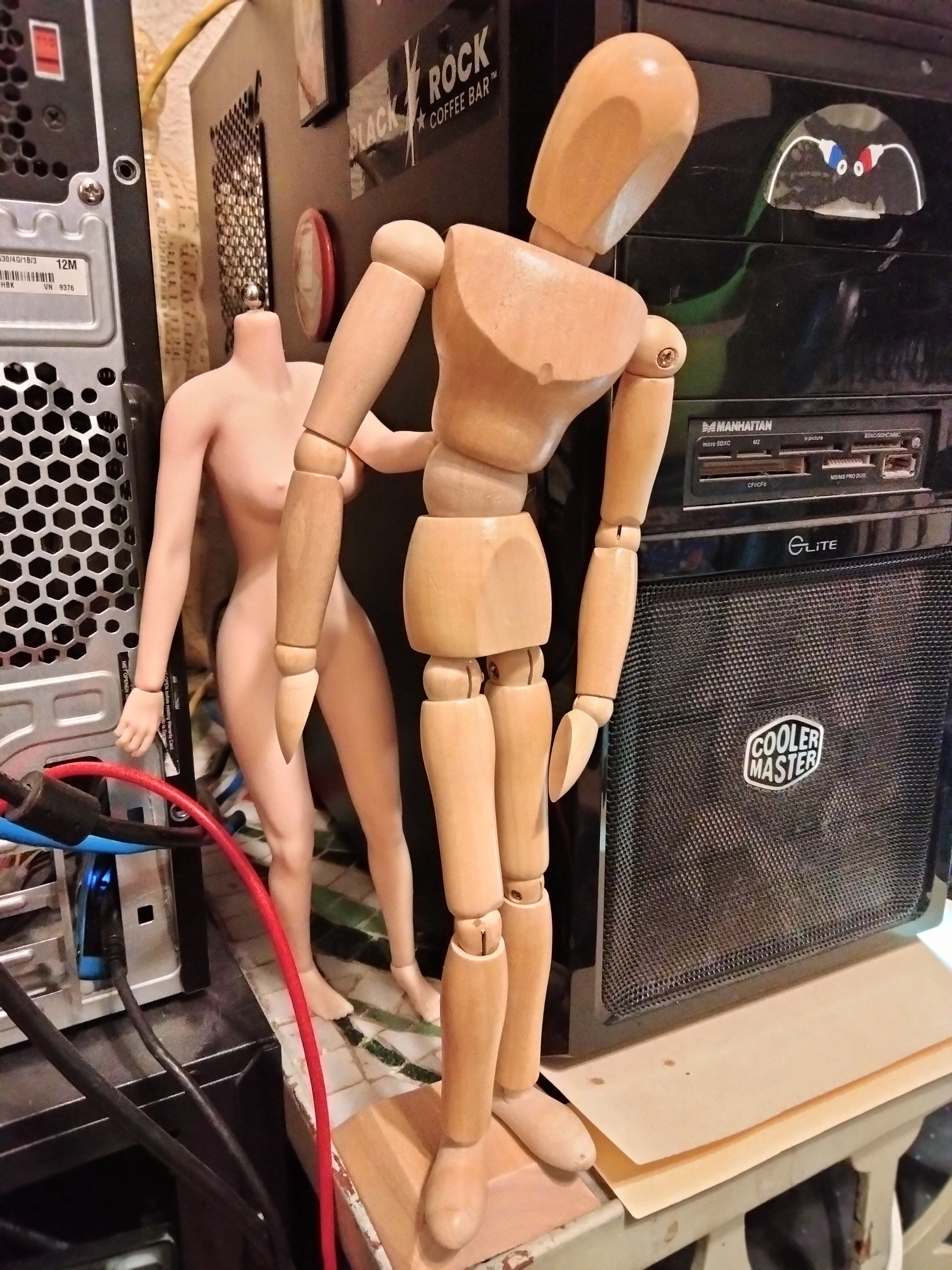
Two mannequins of different types

Mannequins were a frequent motif in the works of many early 20th-century artists, notably the metaphysical painters Giorgio de Chirico, Alberto Savinio and Carlo Carrà.

Shop windows displaying mannequins were a frequent photographic subject for Eugène Atget.

Mannequins have been used in horror and science fiction. The Twilight Zone episode "The After Hours" (1960) involves mannequins taking turns living in the real world as people. In the Doctor Who serial Spearhead from Space (1970), an alien intelligence attempts to take over Earth with killer plastic mannequins called Autons.

The romantic comedy film Mannequin (1987) is a story of a window dresser who falls in love with a mannequin that comes to life. The romantic thriller film Bommai (2023) is the story of a person who works in a mannequin factory and falls in love with one of the mannequins, imagining it as his childhood crush.

== Military use ==
Military use of mannequins is recorded amongst the ancient Chinese, such as at the siege of Yongqiu. The besieged Tang army lowered scarecrows down the walls of their castles to lure the fire of the enemy arrows. In this way, they renewed their supplies of arrows. Dummies were also used in the trenches in World War I to lure enemy snipers away from the soldiers.

In the modern era, mannequins have served as targets in shoot houses and target ranges.

A Central Intelligence Agency (CIA) report describes the use of a mannequin ("Jack-in-the-Box") as a countersurveillance measure, intended to make it more difficult for the host country's counterintelligence to track the movement of CIA agents posing as diplomats. A "Jack-in-the-Box"—mannequin representing the upper half of a human—would quickly replace a CIA agent after he left the car driven by another agent and walked away, such that any counterintelligence officers monitoring the car would believe, at least briefly, that they were still in it.

== See also ==
- Agalmatophilia, sexual attraction to mannequins
- Crash test dummy
- Ivan Ivanovich - dummy used in Vostok spacecraft test flights
- Resusci Anne
- Automatonophobia - fear of mannequins, dolls, animatronics, and wax figures
