= Cynthia (Gaba girl) =

Mannequin

One of the photos of Cynthia in a December 1937 edition of Life magazine

"Cynthia" was a mannequin created in 1932 by Lester Gaba, an American sculptor, retail display designer and later a teacher and writer. An unusually natural and human-looking mannequin, Gaba used the attention Cynthia garnered to further anthropomorphize her. As a result, Gaba and Cynthia became famous, with Gaba becoming known for his mannequins, and with Cynthia appearing in magazines and being invited to high society events. Gaba's development of lighter-weight mannequins, with more natural, human features, along with Cynthia's popularity, impacted the use of mannequins in retail sales marketing.

== History ==
In 1932, artist Lester Gaba created Cynthia for Saks Fifth Avenue. Made from plaster, Cynthia weighed 100 pounds (45 kg) and, unusually, had realistic human imperfections like freckles, pigeon toes, and even different sized feet.

Another of Gaba's mannequins, nicknamed "Grace", appeared on the cover of Life magazine on July 12, 1937—the accompanying article stated she was created at a cost of $150 ($3,281 in 2024). For the Life edition of December 13, 1937, Gaba posed with Cynthia around New York City for a photo shoot, humorously demonstrating how life-like mannequins had become. Gaba further anthropomorphized Cynthia, and she began to receive invitations, fan mail and gifts, and to attend events. Gaba insisted that Cynthia had laryngitis, to account for her lack of speech during personal appearances.

Additionally, a whole host of "Gaba girls" were to follow. The Gaba girls were life-sized mannequins modeled after well-known New York debutantes for the windows of Best & Company. They were much lighter, at 30 pounds (14 kg), than the typical 200-pound (91 kg) New York store mannequin. With the Gaba girls and their realistic successors’ appeal, mannequins became an important new tool used by sellers to attract their clientele.

Cynthia herself soon became dazzlingly famous. Cartier and Tiffany sent her jewelry, Lilly Daché designed hats for her, and couturiers sent her their latest fashions, furrieries sent minks. Cynthia began to receive large quantities of fan mail and was photographed by Alfred Eisenstaedt. She was given a credit card from Saks Fifth Avenue, and had a box seat subscription to the Metropolitan Opera House. She had her own newspaper column and a successful radio show. In 1938, she went to Hollywood to appear in the movie Artists and Models Abroad. In 1939, she was back in New York to see the notorious play Madame Bovary at the Broadhurst Theater.

Some accounts of Cynthia's exploits appear to be apocryphal, as they lack corroboration by contemporary reporting. These include later reports of her being invited to the wedding of Prince Edward and Wallis Simpson (held in France in June 1937), and being flown to England for the coronation of Elizabeth II (held in London in June 1953). Various information about Cynthia published by fashion columnist Alice Hughes lack corroboration from other sources.

In October 1941, Hughes stated that Gaba had tired of Cynthia, and the mannequin had been moved to the shop of a clothing designer on Park Avenue. In April 1947, Hughes stated that Cynthia had, at an unspecified point in time, "silently slipped off a chair and broke into a thousand pieces". While another source states it was reported by the press "as if a real person had died", contemporary examples of such reporting are lacking. In July 1950, Hughes reported that Gaba had restored Cynthia, installing "electronic talking and moving devices", and that she was being considered for a television soap opera. In July 1957, Hughes wrote that following Cynthia's unsuccessful television tryouts, Gaba had retired her, and thereafter only took her out once a year for display at Saks Fifth Avenue.
