= Stepney All Saints School =

Stepney All Saints Church of England Secondary School
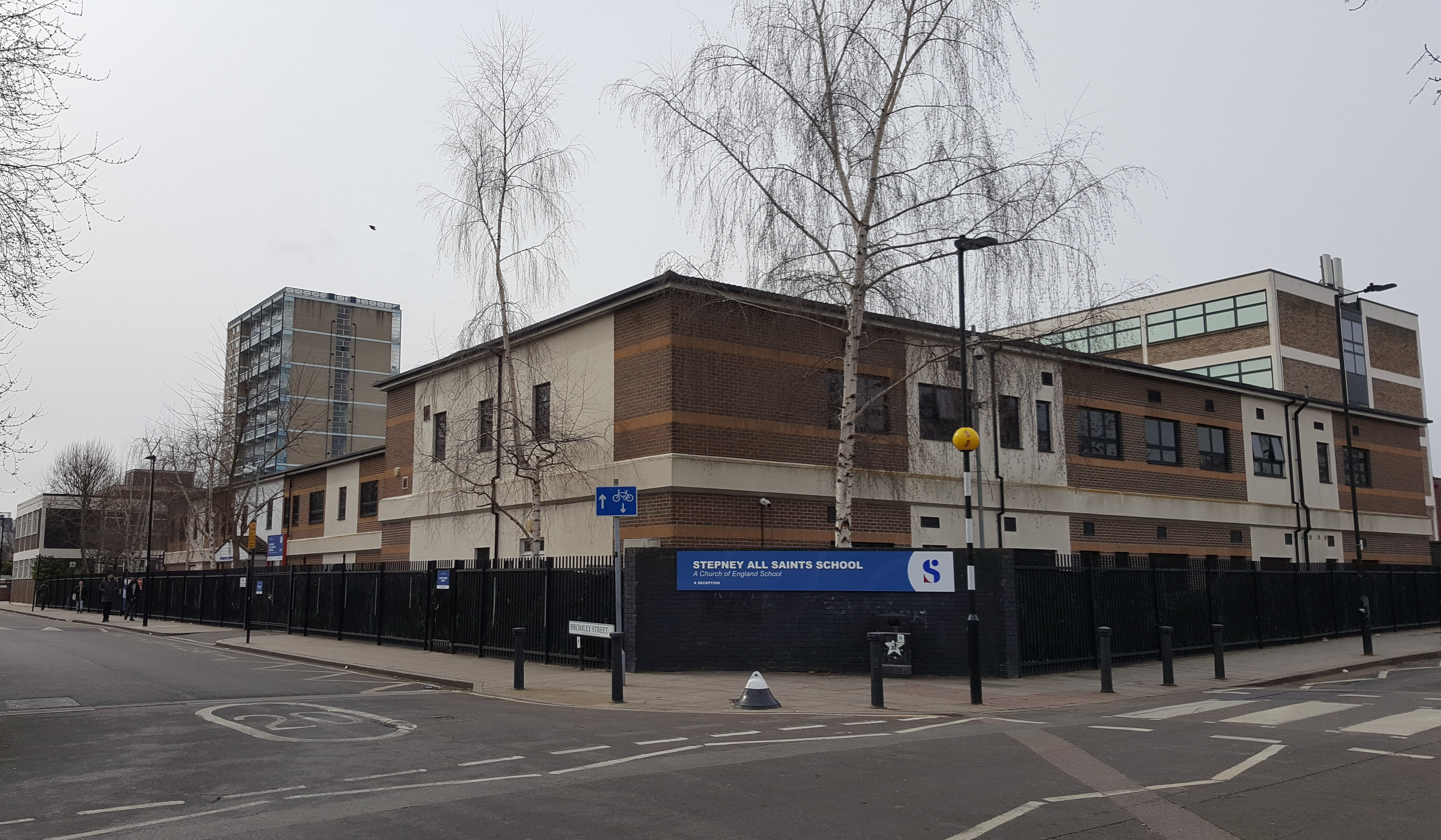

Location
- Stepney Way; London, E1 0RH; England; 51.5164°N 0.0439°W

Information
- Former name: Sir John Cass's Foundation and Redcoat School
- Type: Voluntary aided school
- Religious affiliation: Church of England
- Established: 1710; 316 years ago
- Local authority: Tower Hamlets
- Department for Education URN: 100977 Tables
- Ofsted: Reports
- Headteacher: Paul Woods
- Gender: Coeducational
- Age: 11 to 18
- Enrolment: 1830 (1366 Secondary, 464 Sixth -Form)
- Website: https://stepneyallsaints.school

Stepney All Saints Church of England Secondary School (formerly known as Sir John Cass's Foundation and Redcoat School) is a Church of England voluntary aided school and sixth form located in Stepney, London, England. The last Ofsted report in October 2015 rated SJCR School as "Outstanding."

== History ==
Sir John Cass was born in the City of London on 20 February 1661 and, during his lifetime, served as both Alderman and Sheriff. He was also MP for the City and knighted in 1712. Sir John Cass was also a major figure in the early development of the Atlantic slave trade.

John Cass was the son of Thomas Cass, a naval architect.

In 1710 Cass set up a school for 50 boys and 40 girls and rented buildings in the churchyard of St Botolph-without-Aldgate.

Intending to leave the vast majority of his property to the independent school (having already generously supported the parochial school), when he died in 1718 of a brain haemorrhage, Cass had only initialled three pages of his will. The incomplete will was contested, but was finally upheld by the Court of Chancery thirty years after his death. The charity school was managed by nine independent trustees named in the will, none of whom were ex-officio or nominated by external bodies. The school, which by this time had been forced to close, was re-opened, and the foundation established.

It was decided to separate primary and secondary school education, and a suitable site was found in Stepney.

The Red Coat School, Stepney, has had various names including Stepney Parish Day Schools, Stepney Church School and the Charity School in the Hamlet of Mile End Old Town. It was established in 1714 by voluntary subscription for the clothing and education of a limited number of boys born within Mile End Old Town. The school-house was built on Stepney Green (though the boys were separately housed in Mile End Road for some time).

Both the Sir John Cass and the Red Coat school merged to become the Sir John Cass's Foundation and Red Coat School, opening doors for the first time on 5 September 1966.

In November 2014 an Ofsted inspection downgraded the school to "inadequate" due to safeguarding issues, after the inspection found that students from the sixth-form's Islamic Society had shared links to extremist material on Facebook. The inspectors also found that the school segregated boys from girls outside of lessons, and felt that it failed to do enough to keep students safe from the risks posed by extremism. Other schools in Tower Hamlets were also inspected at the same time in wake of the Trojan Horse scandal.

In September 2016, SJCR School celebrated fifty years in education. All alumni (ex-pupils and ex-staff) were invited to join in the celebrations.

In June 2020, during the global George Floyd protests, it was announced the school would be changing its name to remove the reference to Sir John Cass due to his connections with the slave trade. Following a consultation with students, staff, governors and parents, the school was renamed Stepney All Saints School.

In September 2023, the school became the only one in the United Kingdom to completely close due to concerns about reinforced autoclaved aerated concrete (RAAC).

== Catchment ==
The school admits pupils aged 11 to 18, with approximately 1400 students in the main school and 720 in the sixth form. Although the school is run by the Church of England, ninety per cent of its pupils come from ethnic Bangladeshi, mainly Muslim backgrounds.

== Ofsted Ratings ==
As of December 2021 the school has undergone four full inspections and had five additional visits from Ofsted.

Past Ofsted ratings
Year of Inspection	Grade	Link to full inspection report
2005 (first inspection)	Good	
2008	Outstanding	
2014	Inadequate	
2015	Outstanding	

== Results ==
=== 2015 ===
GCSE Results 2015

- 141 pupils achieved 5 A*–C grades, including English and Maths (75%)
- 83% of pupils achieved 5+ A*–C grade GCSEs (or equivalent)
- 49% of pupils achieved the English Baccalaureate
- 87% of pupils made at least expected progress in English
- 84% of pupils made at least expected progress in Maths
- 154 pupils achieved an A*–C in English (83%)
- 164 pupils achieved an A*–C in Maths (85%)
- 30 pupils achieved 8 or more A*/A grades including 10 pupils with over 11 A*/A grades
- 65 pupils achieve 3 or more A*/A grades (35%)

Key Stage 5 Results – 2015

- Academic Qualifications
  - Average point score per academic entry 220.3
  - Average point score per academic student (full-time equivalent) 791.41
- Vocational Qualifications
  - Average point score per vocational entry 256.8
  - Average point score per vocational student (full-time equivalent) 821
