= Lester Gaba =

American sculptor, writer (1907–1987)

- Born: June 24, 1907; Centerville, Iowa, U.S.
- Died: August 12, 1987 (aged 80); Manhattan, New York, U.S.
- Occupations: Sculptor, writer, retail display designer
- Notable work: Cynthia (mannequin)

Lester Gaba (June 24, 1907 – August 12, 1987) was an American sculptor, writer and retail display designer.

== Biography ==
Gaba was born in Centerville, Iowa, and grew up in Hannibal, Missouri. (Note: Gaba's draft registration card of October 1940 listed Centerville, Iowa, as his place of birth, and noted that his mother (who was listed as a point of contact) lived in Hannibal, Missouri. His obituary in The New York Times said he was born in Hannibal, Missouri.) His parents owned a general store, but Gaba took no interest in the shop, spending most of the time on his own, drawing. At the age of 10, he participated in a soap sculpture contest organized by Procter & Gamble. Although he did not win it, participating changed his life. He decided he would become a proficient soap sculptor. He went to art school in Chicago, where he spent a lot of time in Lake View, where Chicago's homosexual population congregated.

Gaba found his first job at Balaban & Katz theater corporation, where he made posters. Since the art director of the company was entranced by the soap figurines Gaba made, they were readily used for magazine covers and the like. Advertising agencies seized on the technique and soon Gaba's soap carvings were adorning magazine covers as well as being marketed as a children's soap. He published several books on the sculpting of soap in his time.

By 1932, Gaba had moved to New York City, where he began to design life-like mannequins. One of his creations, a mannequin nicknamed "Grace", appeared on the cover of Life magazine, and another mannequin known as "Cynthia", which he created for Saks Fifth Avenue, became rather famous and was also featured in Life.

Gaba used the attention that Cynthia garnered to further anthropomorphize her, allowing Gaba to become known for his mannequins. His development of lighter-weight mannequins, with more natural, human features, along with Cynthia's popularity, impacted the use of mannequins in retail sales marketing; soon a host of "Gaba girls" followed. The Gaba girls were life-sized mannequins modelled after well-known New York debutantes for the windows of Best & Company. They reduced the weight of a New York store mannequin from 200 pounds (91 kg) to around 30 pounds (14 kg). With the Gaba girls and their realistic successors’ appeal, mannequins became a popular new tool for sellers to attract their clientele.

During his first years in New York, it is claimed but unverified that Gaba had a relationship with Vincente Minnelli. When Minnelli left for Hollywood, Gaba seems to have remained aloof, and single for the remainder of his life.

From 1941 to 1967, Gaba contributed the weekly column "Lester Gaba Looks at Display" to Women's Wear Daily, commenting on aspects and trends of window display design as marketing for retail clothing. In the 1940s and 1950s, Gaba began staging elaborate and theatrical fashion shows for the Coty Awards, the March of Dimes, and for fashion trade groups; the creative shows involved various highlights, such as marionettes, and/or and props such as the Hope Diamond and the Star of the East.

Gaba, in addition to his soap sculptures and mannequin designs, became an accomplished jewelry designer. His work for Coro Jewelry consisted of higher-end costume jewelry and was very “Americana”.

In retirement, Gaba was asked to teach at the Laboratory Institute of Merchandising (now LIM College). He became a noted academic on visual merchandising, and taught for several years. Gaba later owned a home on Fire Island where he vacationed. In his later years, he became noted for his still-life painting.

Gaba died of cancer of the colon at Beekman Downtown Hospital in Manhattan in 1987, aged 80. There were no surviving relations.

Gaba was a hybrid artist whose influence on modern art is underestimated. He reinvented the store mannequin and revolutionized window dressing. Years before Andy Warhol and Roy Lichtenstein, Gaba displayed giant dotted images. His public appearances with Cynthia made him a pioneer of performance art.

Comic strip artist Wyeth Yates created a comic novel about Gaba and Cynthia, published in 2017.

== Works ==
In cooperation with the National Soap Sculpture Committee, Gaba wrote a book on the technique of soap carving called Soap Carving: Cinderella of Sculpture, published in 1939.

Gaba wrote the seminal text The Art of Window Display, published in 1952, one of the first serious books on the topic in the marketplace.
