= Statue of John Cass =

Sculpture by Louis-François Roubelard

Coordinates: 51.5163°N 0.0916°W

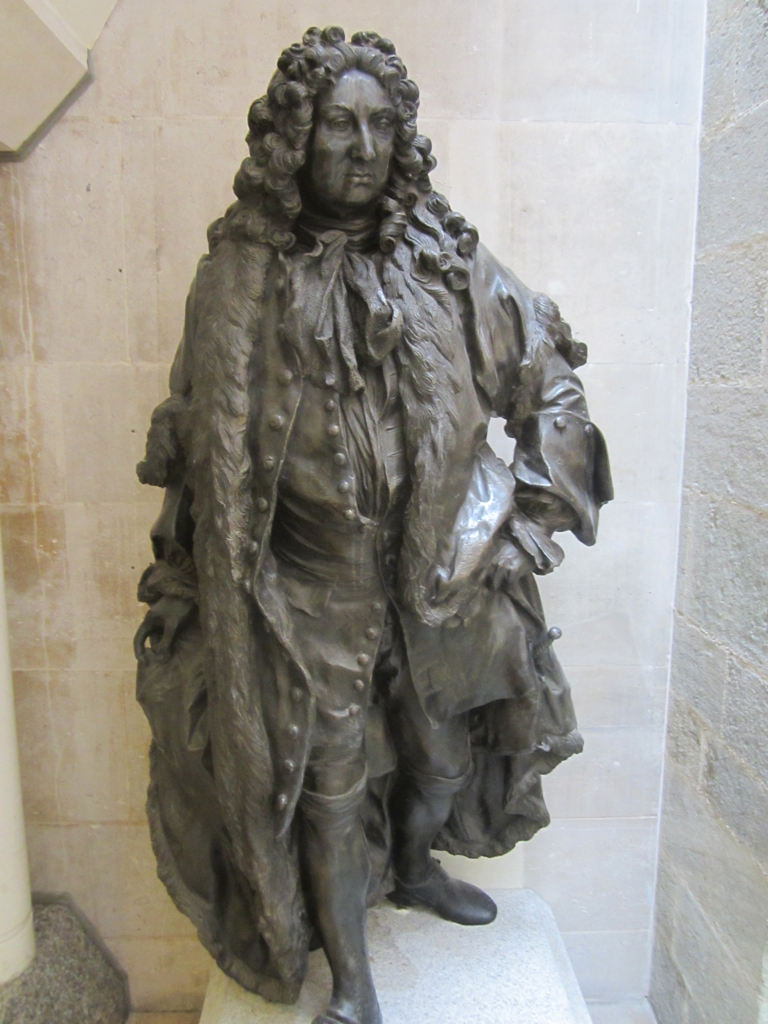
- The original statue in the Guildhall, 2014
- Artist: Louis-François Roubiliac
- Year: 1751
- Subject: John Cass
- Location: Guildhall; City of London

The statue of John Cass is a lead figure by Louis-François Roubiliac of John Cass (1661–1718), the English merchant and Member of Parliament. The original statue of 1751 now stands in the Guildhall in London. There is also a fibreglass replica at the School of Art, Architecture and Design at London Metropolitan University in Jewry Street, installed in 1998.

== History ==
The Sir John Cass Foundation commissioned the original statue in 1751. It stood for many years on Aldgate High Street, before being relocated to the John Cass Institute (now London Metropolitan University) in Jewry Street in 1869. The statue was finally relocated to the Guildhall in 1980, and a fibreglass replica replaced the original at London Metropolitan University, where it has stood since 1998.

Another statue which stood at the University of East London in Newham was removed on 11 June 2020.

In June 2020, during the anti-racism protests in Britain following the murder of George Floyd in the United States, many controversial statues became the target of attacks and scrutiny. The mayor of London, Sadiq Khan, established the Commission for Diversity in the Public Realm in order to review statues and monuments in the city. The statues of John Cass have been included in the review due to his involvement in the slave trade.

== See also ==
- List of monuments and memorials removed during the George Floyd protests
- List of public art formerly in London
- List of public statues of individuals linked to the Atlantic slave trade
