= Soap carving =

Form of sculpture using soap

Soap carving is the artform of carving soap with a variety of tools to create sculptures and images. In the United States, it has its roots in a Procter & Gamble competition from the 1920s. In Thailand, it has artistic roots in local practices of Thai fruit and vegetable carving.

== Origins ==
During Great Depression era of the 1920s and 1930s, Procter & Gamble held soap carving contests to help advertise their soap, with the National Soap Sculpture Competition in White Soap being announced in 1924. The competition drew in over five hundred submissions across roughly two hundred and fifty applicants. An exhibition of the soap carving sculptures were showcased at the Art Center, New York, from December 1924 to January 1925. First prize brought in a reward of $250 to sculptor Brenda Putnam for a work called "The Vamp". Putnam was quoted by The American Magazine of Art to have wanted to "lift the soap carving out of the amateur and into the professional field," as she believed it had advantages over other, more popularly used mediums. Putnam was amongst the earliest advocates for soap carving, and a section of her 1939 book The Sculptor's Way is dedicated to soap carving. Some of Putnam's soap carving work is in a collection at the Amon Carter Museum of American Art. In 1932, the competition received four thousand entries, with first prize fetching $500 as an award, and winning pieces were exhibited at the Gimbel Brothers' New York store. Judges for the competition include sculptor Lorado Taft, who wished to spread art to wider groups, and additionally served as a jurist at annual schoolchildren soap carving contests, as he had carved soap himself. Other prominent National Soap Sculpture Competition in White Soap judges include Charles Dana Gibson, Bessie Potter Vonnoh, Gutzon Borglum, Harriet Whitney Frishmuth, Leo Lentelli, Alexander Archipenko, and Robert Laurent.

Soap carving in Thailand is an art developed from the artistic background of sculpting fruits and vegetables in Thai culture, which originates from the time of the Sukhothai Kingdom. Soap as a medium for Thai carvings began sometime before the 1932 Siamese revolution. Soap carving is now a local craft, and artists create elaborate soap carving sculptures such as dragons and scented flowers out of soap carving. Modern day local artists have claimed to have personally been doing soap carvings since at least the 1990s.

Through the 1930s to at least the 1940s, there was a group called the National Soap Sculpture Committee. Sculptor Lester Gaba, whose soap carvings have been exhibited at the Mark Twain Boyhood Home & Museum Gallery, worked alongside the National Soap Sculpture Committee to publish a book on soap carving techniques. The National Soap Sculpture Committee also provided booklets such as "Soap Sculpture. A Digest of Soap Carving: Its History - Its Uses - Its Value in Art and Education". In the 1950s, the Colorado State Art Association also published pamphlets available for purchase on soap carving as part of a series on art education. The rise of soap carving popularity in the United Kingdom was noted in 1940.

Soap carving classes and exhibitions have been historically held at schools and museums such as at the School of the Art Institute of Chicago by the Chicago Art Student's League, the Corcoran Art school, the Art Institute of Chicago, and the Milwaukee Art Museum. Exhibitions have also appeared at the National Sculpture Society in San Francisco in 1929 and the Nurses' Hobby Show at Rochester General Hospital.

Soap carving has been broadly used as an activity at a range of places, from camps to elementary schools to handicap rehabilitation facilities to prisons, across the country from the 1940s through the 1980s. Soap carving also appeared in the 1970s as the subject of another art medium, poetry, in The Centennial Review by the Michigan State University Press which was written in tribute to Sylvia Plath.

== Techniques ==
The Milwaukee Art Museum mentions the possibility of carving soap with pen knives, sticks, and hair pins to create scenes, images, or sculptures historically.

For the museum competition at the Chemung County Historical Society, contestants were given a 4 ounce block of Ivory soap, and were allowed to carve and sculpt with any tool available, as long as the original soap had not been altered with added materials, colored, or molded. At an event held at Beltrami County Historical Society, the use of safety carving tools to carve soap is mentioned.

In online tutorials, the University of Mississippi Museum talks about using a plastic utensil or a stylus as a carving tool, Kimbell Art Museum suggests a paperclip and pencil, the Georgia Museum of Art suggests a popsicle stick or butter knife, and the Tampa Bay History Center suggests a popsicle stick and pencil.

Sources suggest cutting out or drawing a pattern and replicating the design while carving the soap, or simply free-handing the design or sculpture as one carves the soap.

Thai soap carving is influenced by historical and cultural Thai fruit and vegetable carving, and pulls techniques from this legacy.

== Modern soap carving ==
Soap carving demonstrations, competitions, exhibitions, and history lessons have appeared more recently in the 21st century at places such as the Beltrami County Historical Society, the Chemung County Historical Society, the Spartanburg Art Museum, and the Tampa Bay History Center.

Soap carving is a hobby of the titular character in 2005 novel Becoming Naomi León, as the author once did it herself as a child.

Artist Meekyoung Shin uses soap carving extensively in her classically inspired sculptures.

Thai soap carving classes of varying sizes and skills are available in the current day at the Thai Art & Cultural Center in Bangkok alongside fruit and vegetable carving classes.

== Prominent soap carving artists ==
- Brenda Putnam
- Lester Gaba
- Frédérique Nalbandian
- Meekyoung Shin

== List of instructional books ==
- Lester (1940). Soap Carving, Cinderella of sculpture (Hardcover). The Studio Publications. ISBN 0670655007, 978-0670655007.
- Putnam (1939). The Sculptor's Way: A Guide to Modelling and Sculpture (hardcover). NY: Farrer & Rinehart, Inc. ISBN 0486423131, 978-0486423135.

== Gallery ==
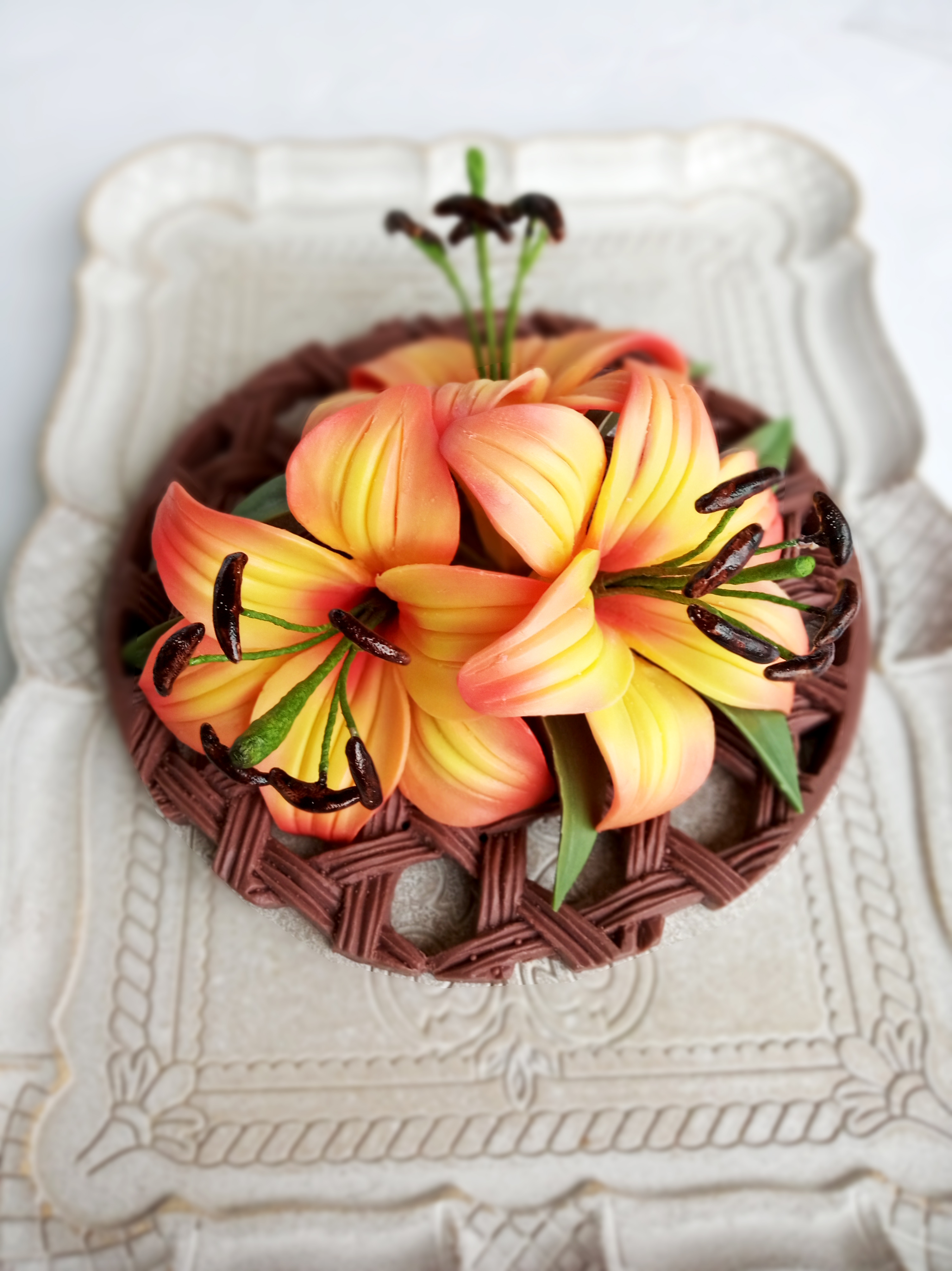
Soap carving of lilies

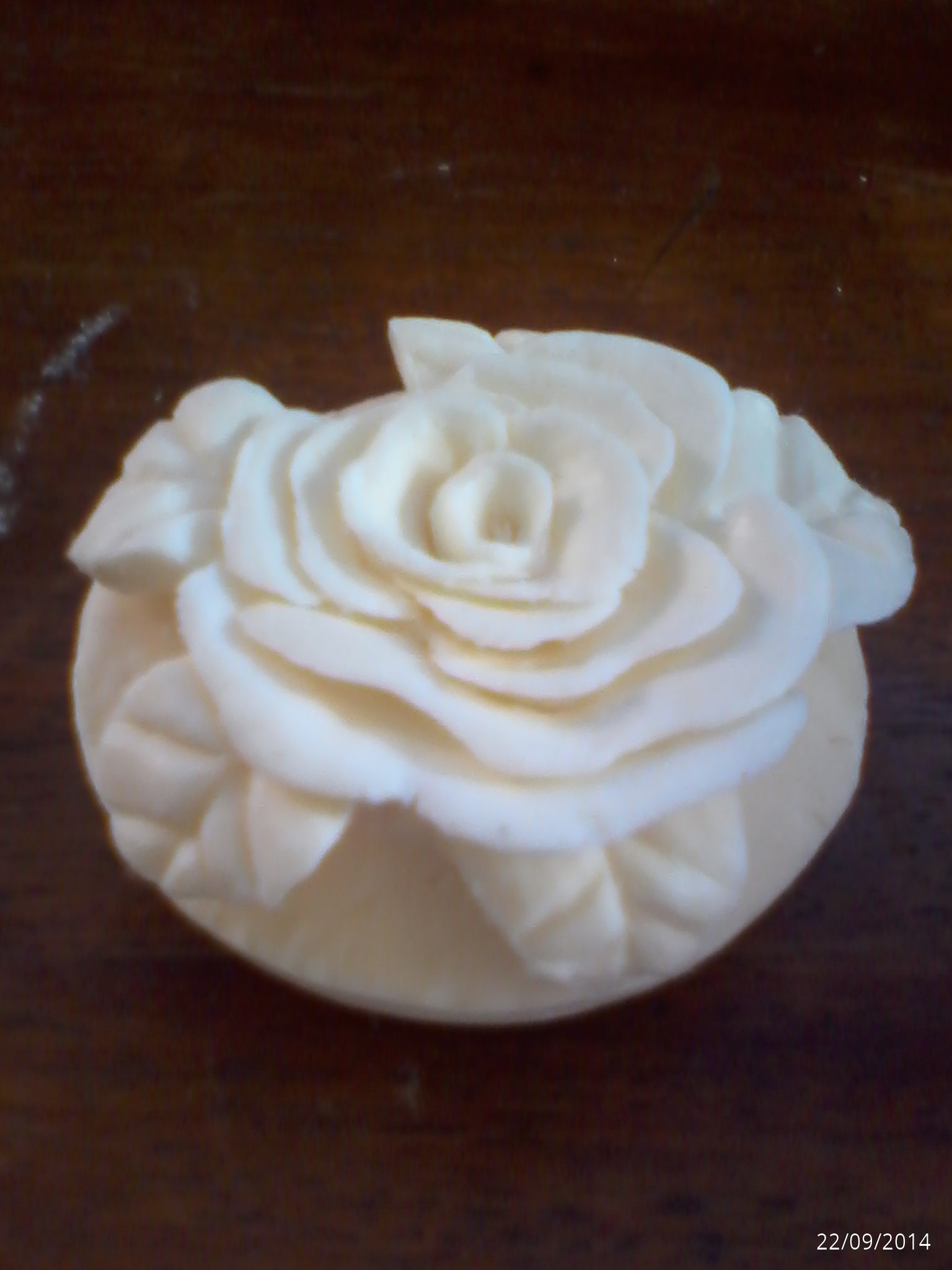
Soap carving of a rose

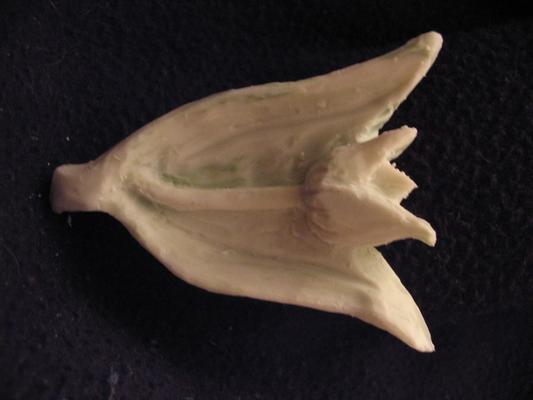
Soap carving of a tulip

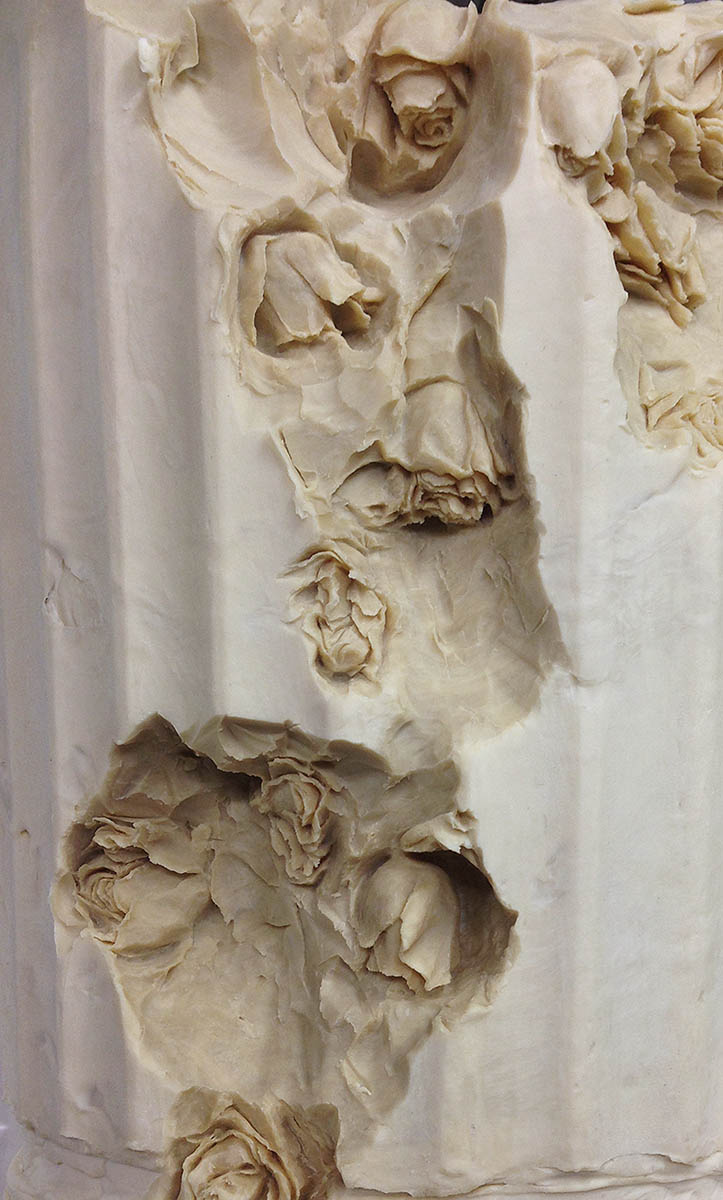
Soap sculpture carving progress of Les Retraites pacifiques by Frédérique Nalbandian, 2017

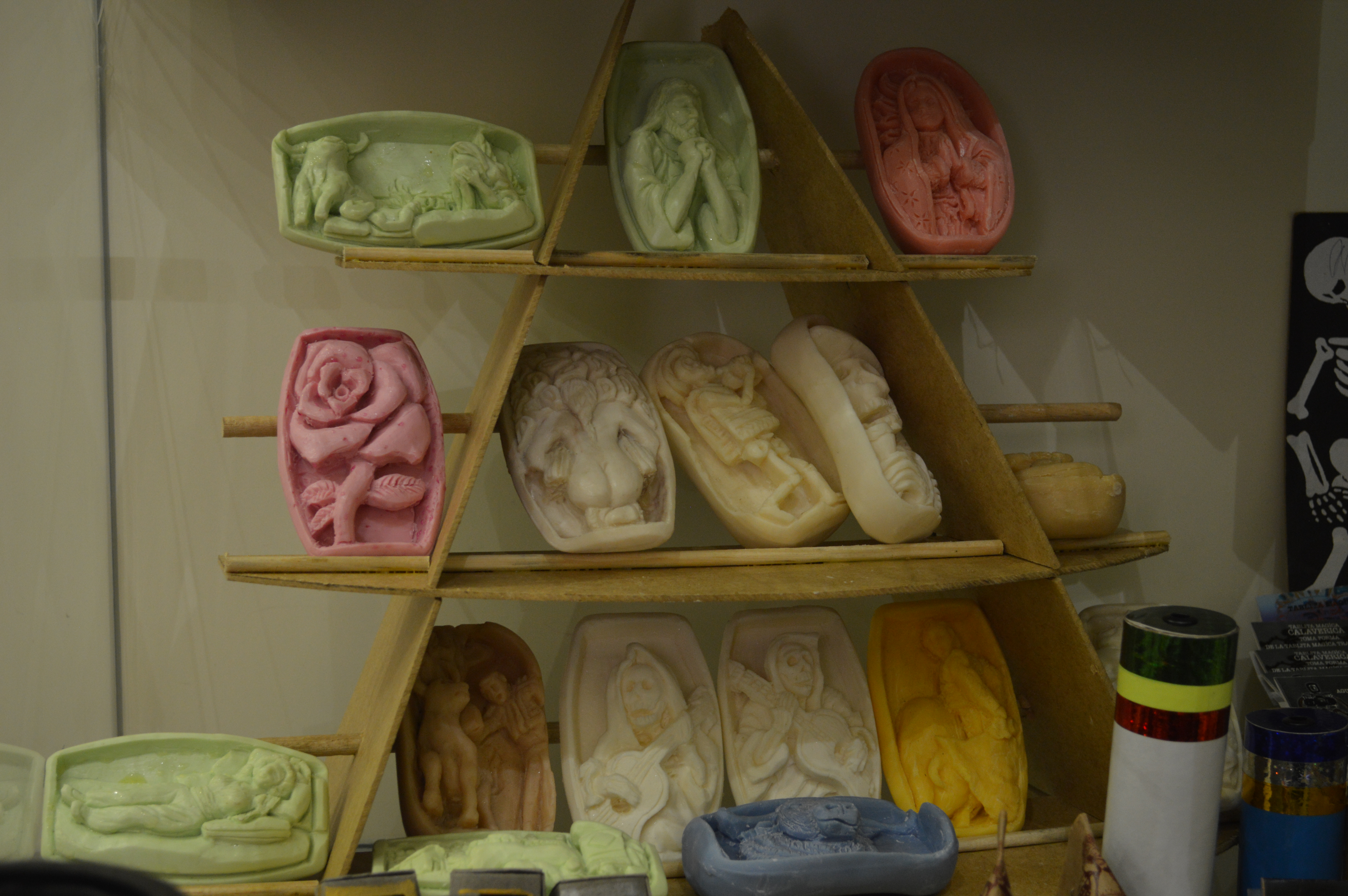
Soap carving assortment in Mexico

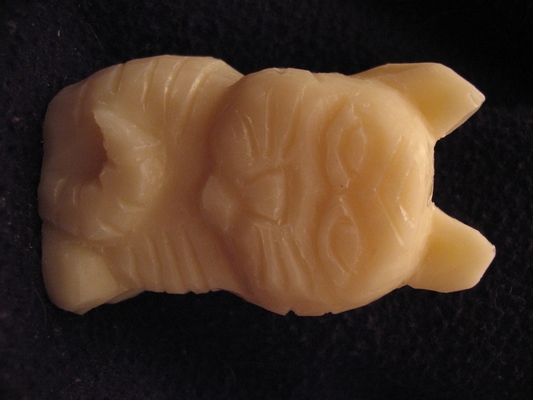
Soap carving of a cat

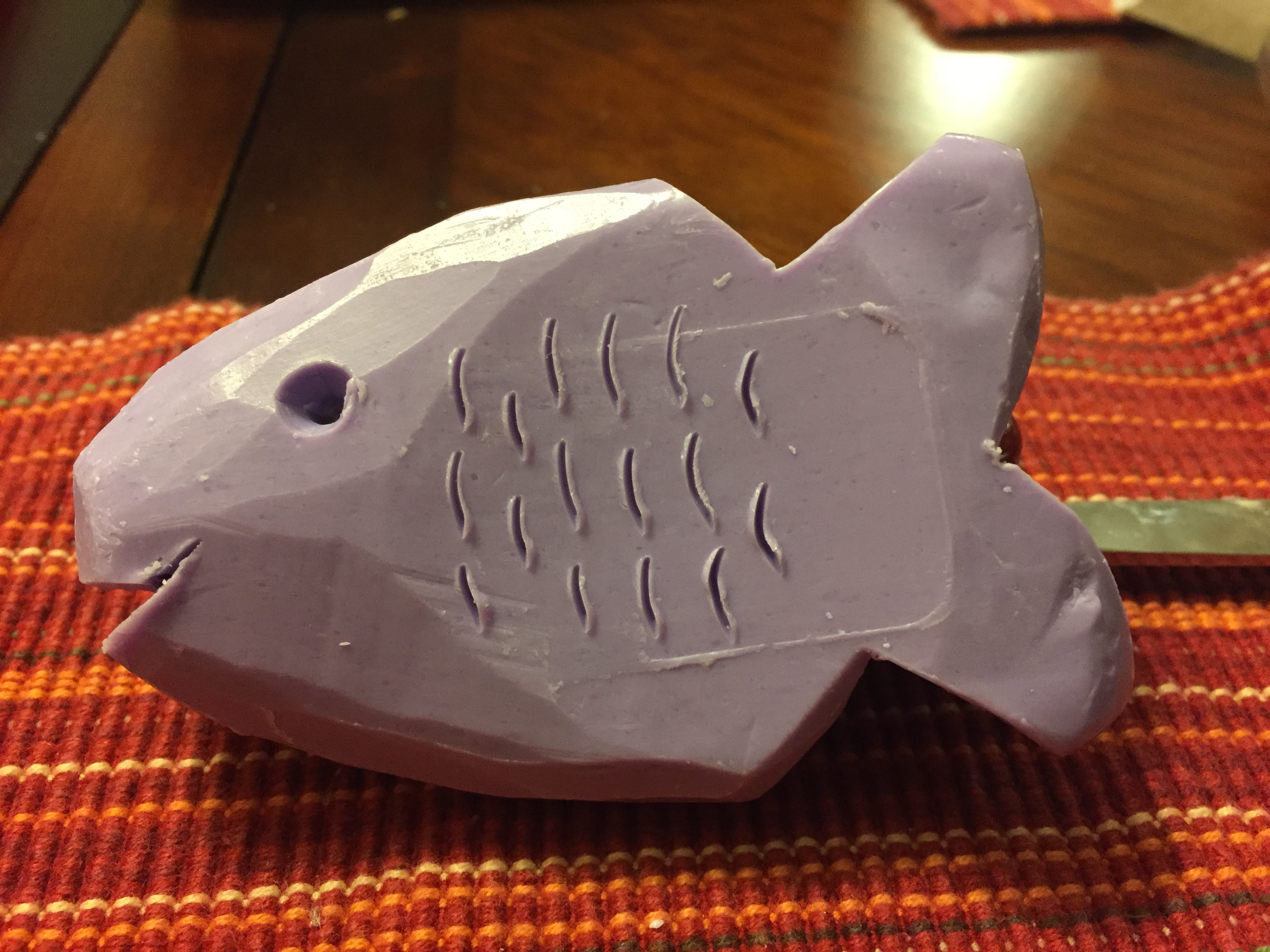
Soap carving of a fish
