= John Cass =

British politician and merchant (1661–1718)

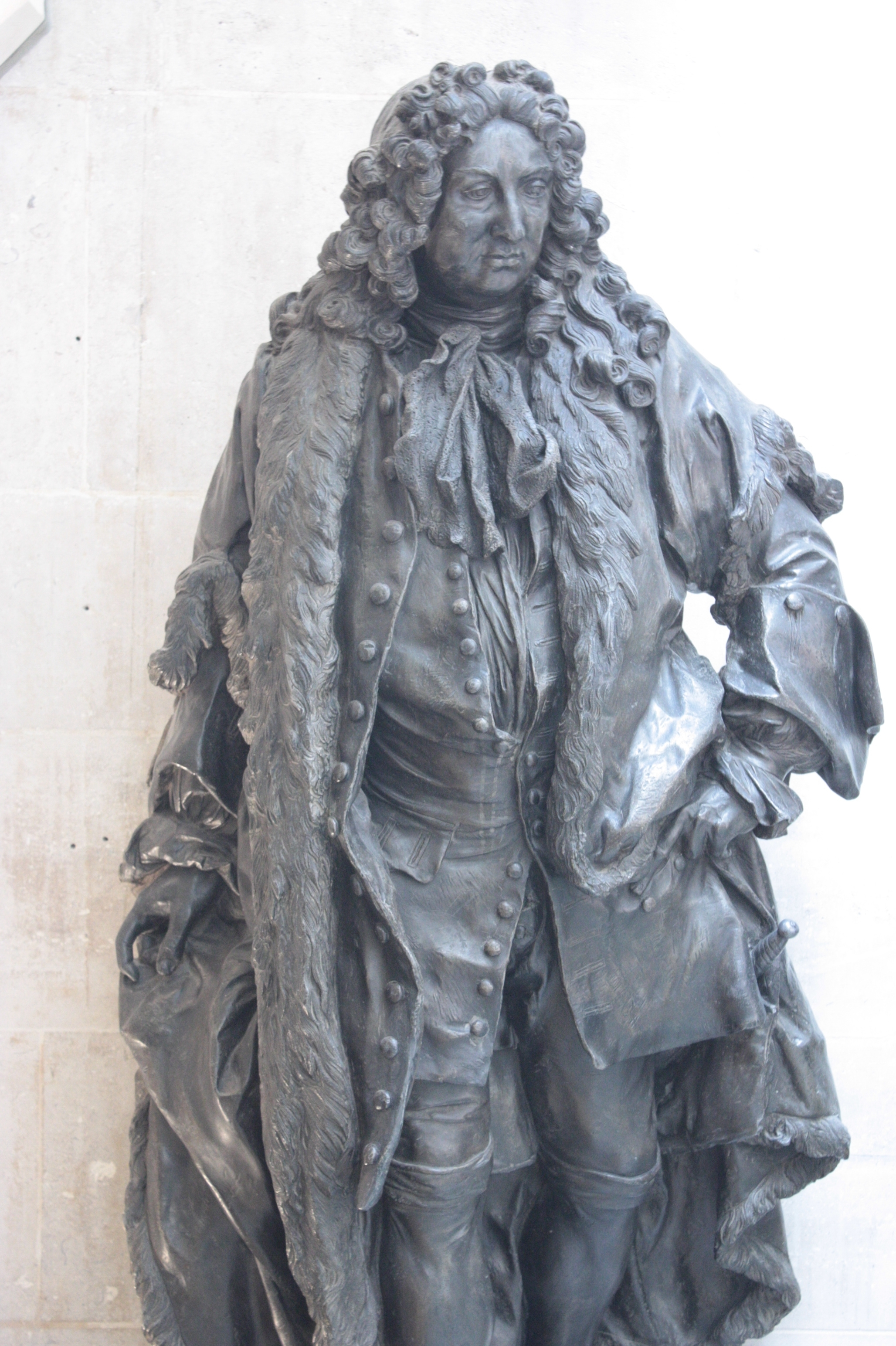
The lead statue of John Cass by Roubiliac at Guildhall, London

Sir John Cass (February 1661 (Note: Baptism 28 February 1661) – 5 July 1718) was an English merchant, Tory Member of Parliament and philanthropist. He was also a key figure in the Royal African Company, which was involved in the Atlantic slave trade.

== Biography ==
=== Early life ===
He was born in Rosemary Lane, in the City of London, son of Thomas Cass, carpenter to the Royal Ordnance. He was baptised on 28 February 1661 at St Botolph's Aldgate. In 1665, the family moved to Grove Street, in South Hackney, to escape the plague.

On 7 January 1684, he married Elizabeth Franklin.

=== Career ===
Cass was a merchant, builder and politician.

In 1705, Cass became a member of the Court of Assistants (equivalent to the board of directors) of the Royal African Company, which since 1662 had held the monopoly in England on trading along the West Africa coast in gold, silver, ivory and slaves. The company had been set up by King Charles II and his brother, the Duke of York (later King James II), who was the company's governor, together with City of London merchants. The slaves were sold for labour on tobacco and, increasingly, sugar plantations. He held shares in the Royal African Company until his death. During the years that Cass held the position of Court of Assistants (1705–1708), the company undertook and documented fifty-five voyages, mostly journeying from London, of over 14,000 enslaved Africans for the Americas.

Cass was elected as one of the Tory MPs for the City in 1710. He was re-elected in 1713 but lost to the Whig faction in 1715. He served as alderman for the ward of Portsoken from January 1711 and in June 1711 was elected as one of the sheriffs of London. As sheriff, he was knighted in June 1712.

He was appointed a commissioner of the Commission for Building Fifty New Churches in 1711; this was a scheme to provide new churches for the rapidly expanding population of the metropolis.

Cass was Master of the Worshipful Company of Carpenters in 1711–12, concurrent with his shrievalty; but in 1714 he transferred to the Skinners' Company, and became their Master.

Between 1709 and 1715, he was the treasurer of the Bridewell and Bethlehem Hospitals.

=== Investment in the Royal African Company ===
On 5 December 1704, Cass bought £1000 worth of Royal African Company stock. In January 1705, the investment Cass had made the year earlier enabled him to be elected as an 'assistant' to the company.

In 1705, Cass increased his holding to £6000 worth of stock. Two years later, in 1707, Cass sold £1000 of his stock to another noteworthy stockholder, Thomas Martin. From 1713 to 1716, Cass held £1700 of Royal African Company stock. The initial £6000 Cass had invested in the Company between 1705 and 1707 would be the equivalent of at least £1 million today. It is also estimated that £6000 is what a cargo of approximately 300 enslaved people would be sold for in early eighteenth-century Jamaica.

=== Death ===
He died on 5 July 1718, aged 57, of a brain haemorrhage and was buried in the churchyard of St Mary Matfelon, in Whitechapel, now the Altab Ali Park. His widow, Elizabeth née Franklin, died on 7 July 1732. They had no children.

== Legacy ==
=== Philanthropy ===
Cass founded a school for 50 boys and 40 girls in buildings in the churchyard of St Botolph's Aldgate in 1709. He had made a will at this time, but when his health failed in 1718, he planned to make a new version taking account of the extra property he had acquired in the intervening years. Cass began a new will, but by the time of his death, only two pages had been initialled. The will, with an estate worth £2,000, was contested by his heirs at law in the Court of Chancery. Lady Cass continued as patroness of the schools but died in 1732. The school continued for a few more years under the aegis of Valentine Brewis, one of the trustees Cass had named, but was closed down after he died in 1738. In the early 1740s, the remaining trustees petitioned Parliament for the permanent endowment of the school, and the will was finally upheld 30 years after Cass's death. This enabled the Sir John Cass's Foundation to be established in 1748.

=== Sir John Cass's Foundation ===
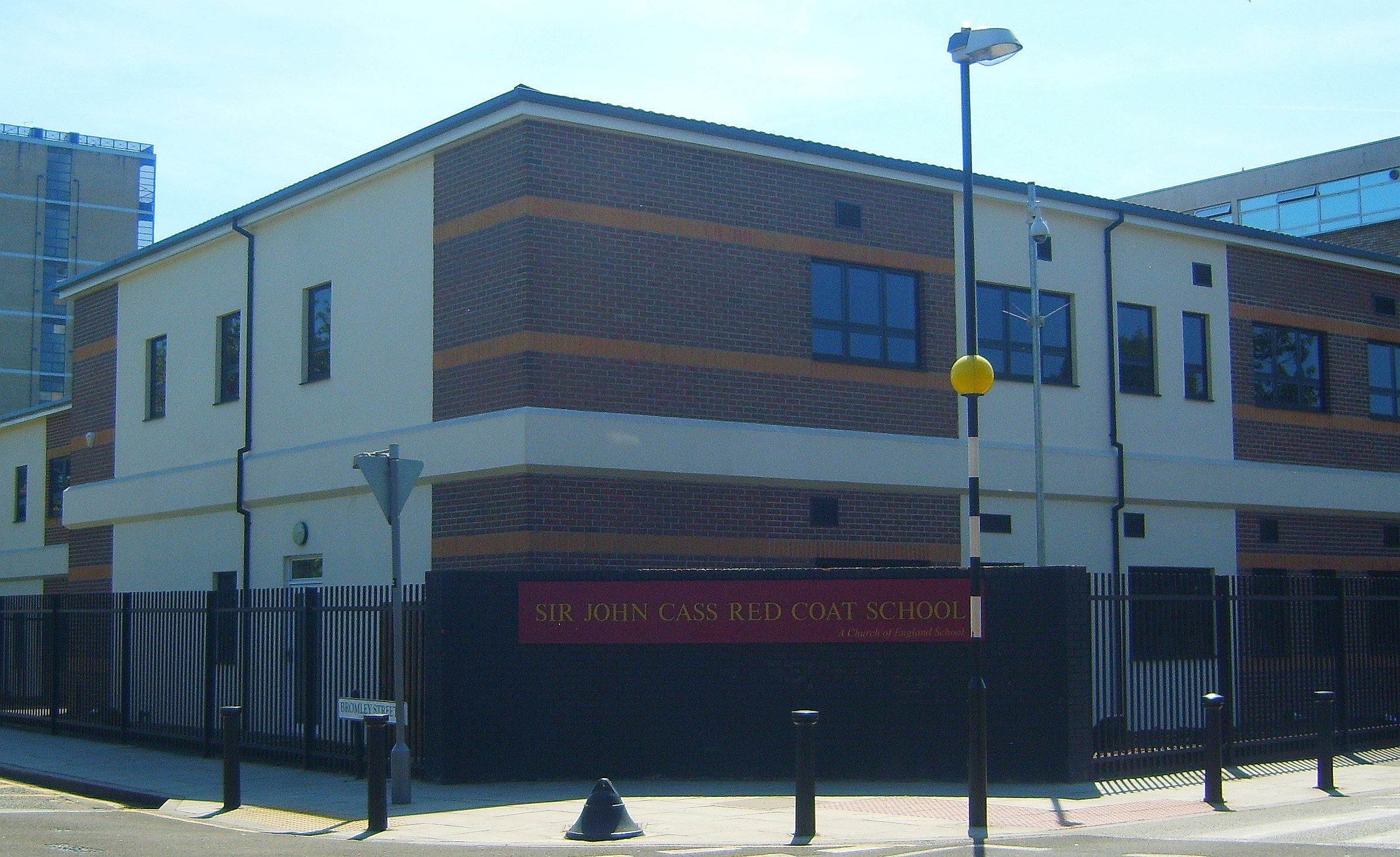
Stepney All Saints School in Stepney, London

His charity continued to fund the Sir John Cass Foundation School and provide for the establishment of the Sir John Cass Technical Institute, which was founded in 1899 and moved into newly built premises at 31 Jewry Street, London, in 1902; becoming Sir John Cass College in 1950. In 1965, the college's Department of Fine and Applied Arts merged with the Department of Silversmithing and Allied Crafts from the Central School of Art to form the Sir John Cass School of Art, which moved into its new premises at Central House, opposite the Whitechapel Art Gallery. The Sir John Cass College merged with the City of London College in 1970 to form the City of London Polytechnic, becoming London Guildhall University and merging to form the London Metropolitan University in 2002.

The modern foundation provides support to a primary school within the City – near to St Botolph's, (The Aldgate School, formerly Sir John Cass's Foundation Primary School); a secondary school (Stepney All Saints School, formerly Sir John Cass Redcoat School) in the London Borough of Tower Hamlets; the School of Art, Architecture and Design within London Metropolitan University; and the Bayes Business School (formerly Cass Business School) within City, University of London.

The foundation has provided funding for the Sir John Cass School of Education at the University of East London campus in Stratford, London, and for Sir John Cass Hall, a hall of residence for students, in Well Street, London Borough of Hackney.

=== Reappraisal ===
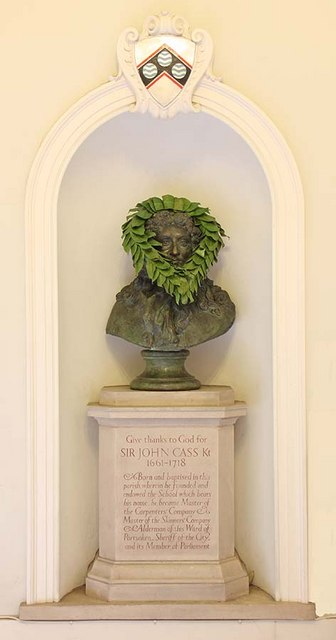
John Cass' wreathed memorial in St Botolph's Aldgate (now removed)

In the United States in May 2020, George Floyd, a black man, was murdered by a white police officer, and in response, there were protests in many cities around the world. In Bristol, the statue of Edward Colston, a slave trader, was toppled. Thus, amongst a broader recognition of racial injustice, many institutions reviewed their historical associations with the slave trade.

In the following months, the Sir John Cass Foundation and many associated organisations changed, or committed to change, their names. London Metropolitan University removed Cass's name from their Art, Architecture and Design School. The foundation itself committed to change its name, later announcing that it would be called The Portal Trust, taking effect in Spring 2021. The business school at City, University of London, removed its association with Cass, instead adopting the name of the 18th-century mathematician Thomas Bayes in September 2021. And the Sir John Cass Redcoat School changed its name to Stepney All Saints School.

=== Memorials ===
- The statue of John Cass is a 1751 lead figure designed by Louis-François Roubiliac. Cass is shown wearing a long wig and the sheriff's gown. The original statue now stands in the Guildhall in London, and several copies stand in various places, including outside the Sir John Cass School, at Duke's Place and Mitre Street. On 21 January 2021, the City of London Corporation announced it would remove the statue due to Cass's involvement in the Royal African Company. This decision was later overturned by the Court of Common Council on 7 October 2021, after accepting a Statutes Working Group Report recommendation to retain the statues, but to add accompanying information to the statue, contextualising John Cass' history and contributions.
- Cassland Road in Hackney commemorates the landholdings of the Cass family in the district. Until December 2020, the gardens on the road were named Cassland Road Gardens.
- A row of almshouses (founded by William Monger) in 1669 was subsequently funded by land owned by Cass on Hackney Marshes. In 1849, they were rebuilt by Sir John Cass's Foundation.
- A statue of Cass was on the facade of the Sir John Cass Foundation building in Jewry Street, in the City of London. It was removed in early July 2020.
- At the University of East London, in Newham, the education and early years department is known as the Cass School of Learning. A statue of Sir John Cass, which stood in the atrium of the Cass building, was removed during the George Floyd protests on 11 June 2020. In a statement, the university said: "We have removed the statue of Sir John Cass from the school of education and communities, and we will be instigating a university wide review of all sources of historical funding along with developing a new institutional naming policy that reflects our values of equality, diversity and inclusion."
- A memorial bust in St Botolph's Aldgate was removed on 20 June 2020.
