= Barakat Gallery =

American art gallery

The Barakat Gallery is an antiquities dealership with locations in London, Los Angeles, Hong Kong, and Seoul. Barakat is considered to have one of the largest collection of ancient art for sale in the world, and one of the largest collections in private hands, at around 40,000 items with total valuation of over US$1.5 billion according to several sources.

The galleries are currently owned by Fayez Barakat, a Palestinian-American artist and antiquities dealer. Barakat is the fifth generation of his family to run the business.

== History ==
The gallery started informally on the Barakat family's farm land in Hebron, Palestine where the family collected antiquities from local farmers that had unearthed them in the course of their labor. The family then sold the antiquities alongside their own produce in the local market.

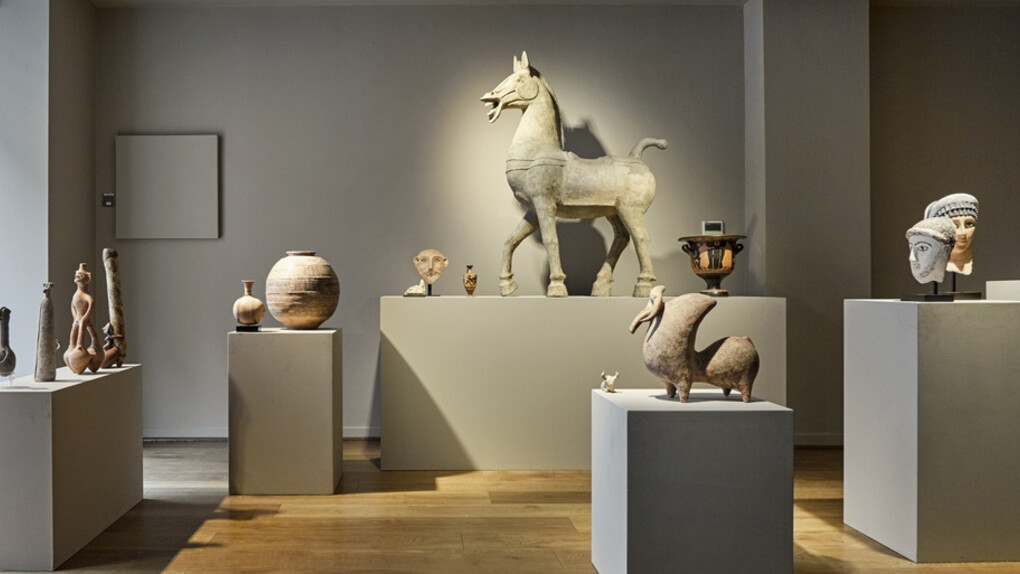
Unglazed Exhibition, which ran 25 Jun — 31 August 2019 at the Barakat Gallery in London, United Kingdom

The modern company was founded with the opening of its first major gallery in Jerusalem in the 1950s and has since expanded to Los Angeles, London, Hong Kong, and Seoul. In 2003, the Rodeo Drive LA gallery was honored by the City of Beverly Hills for its contribution to the arts in Los Angeles.

In 2019, the Getty Museum acquired a sixteenth-century Armenian Gospel Book from the Barakat Gallery.

== Major exhibitions ==
- Beauty in the Ancient Americas: Pre-Columbian Aesthetics, Barakat Gallery Los Angeles, September 2017 to January 2018
- Closer, Barakat Gallery London, February 2019 to April 2019
- Bygone Empires, Barakat Gallery London, April 2019 to June 2019
- Unglazed, Barakat Gallery London, June 2019 to August 2019
- Islamic Masterpieces, Barakat Gallery Seoul, October 2023

== Stolen Buddha ==
In September 2023 a $1.5M Buddha was stolen from the Barakat Gallery in Los Angeles. A single thief allegedly maneuvered the 250-pound sculpture, dating from Japan's Edo Period, out of the Barakat Gallery's backyard and into a rental truck. The ancient buddha was recovered within a week.
