= The Aldgate School =

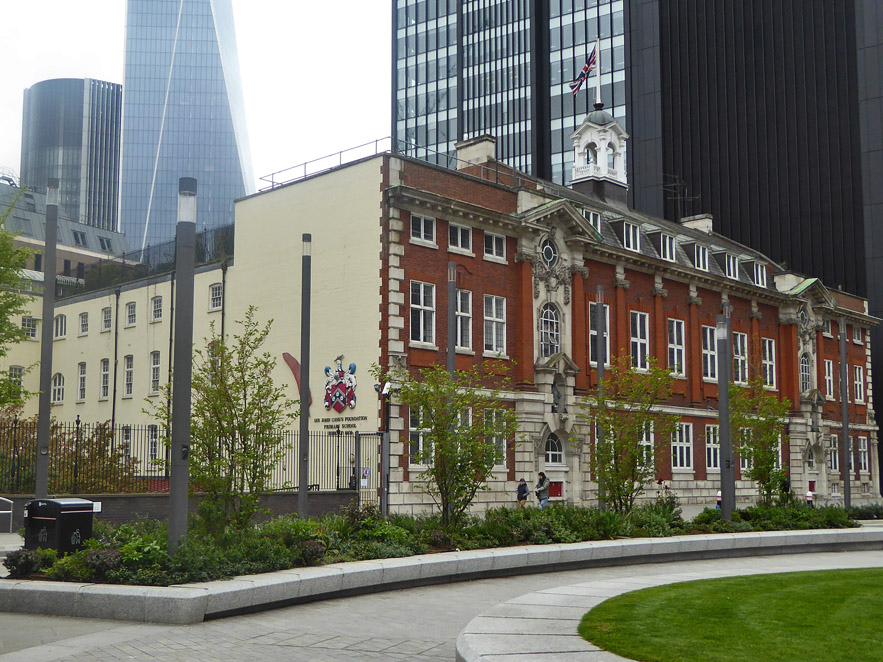

Location
- St James's Passage; London, South East the London, EC3A 5DE; England; 51.5137°N 0.0772°W

Information
- Type: Voluntary aided school
- Motto: Faith, hope and love abide, these three: and the greatest of these is love
- Religious affiliation: Church of England
- Established: 1709
- Local authority: City of London
- Department for Education URN: 100000 Tables
- Ofsted: Reports
- Headteacher: A. Allan
- Gender: Co-educational
- Age: 4 to 11
- Enrolment: 276
- Houses: none
- Website: http://www.thealdgateschool.org/

The Aldgate School (formerly Sir John Cass's Foundation Primary School) is a Church of England primary school located in the City of London, England. It is the only state-funded school in the City of London. The last Ofsted report in 2013 classed it as "Outstanding". The school was founded in 1709 in the churchyard of St Botolph's Aldgate.

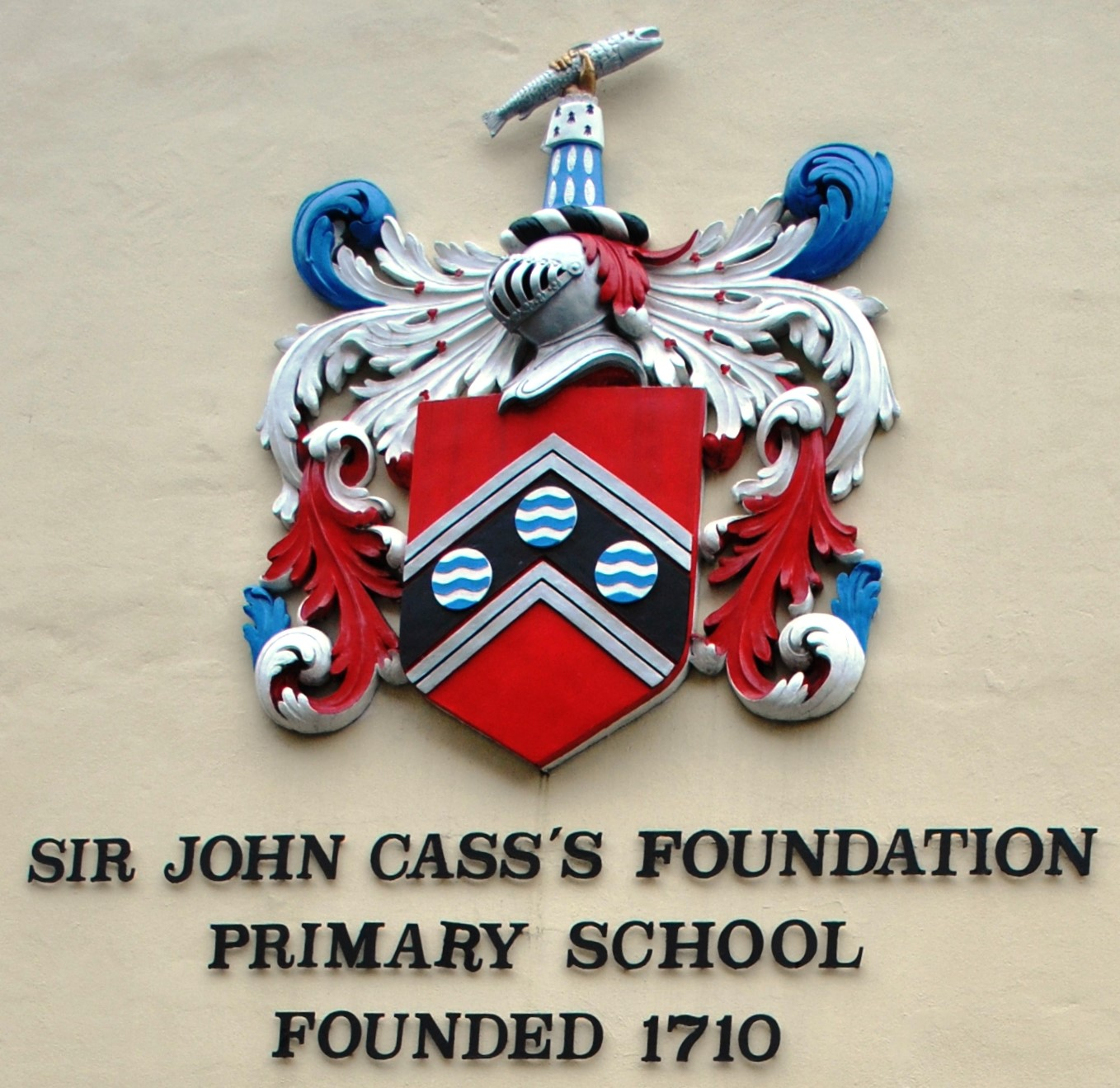
Sign showing the school's former name

The school was previously named after Sir John Cass but was renamed The Aldgate School in September 2020 in the light of Cass's links with the Atlantic slave trade.

== Catchment ==
The Aldgate School admits pupils from the age of 4 (Reception) to the 6th year. There is currently one class of approximately 30 students per year. The school has a small priority catchment area that includes all of the City of London plus a few streets to the east, as far as the A1202 road, Commercial Street, Leman Street and Royal Mint Street.
