= Seliger =

Seliger is a name meaning "blessed man" in German and Yiddish. It may refer to:

- Lake Seliger, Russia
  - Seliger Forum, a yearly Russian youth forum/camp at Lake Seliger
- Seliger Forschungs- und Entwicklungsgesellschaft mbH (Berthold Seliger research and development society)
- Seliger Rocket

== Surname ==
- Berthold Seliger, German rocket technical designer
- Dirk Seliger, German author, illustrator and comic artist
- Howard Harold Seliger (1924–2012), American physicist and biologist
- Kel Seliger (born 1953), Texas state senator
- Marc Seliger (born 1974), German ice hockey goaltender
- Max Seliger (1865–1920), German painter

== See also ==
- Selig (name)
- Seeliger
- Seligmann, Seligman
- Zelig (disambiguation)
