= Seligmann =

Seligmann is a name meaning "blessed man" in German and Yiddish. It may refer to:

== Places ==
- Seligman, Arizona
- Seligman, Missouri

== Other uses ==
- Seligmann (name), for a list of people bearing the surname
- Seligman Crystal, an award of the International Glaciological Society
- J. & W. Seligman & Co., investment bank founded in 1862
- Jacques Seligmann & Company, French and American company dealing in antiques and modern art
- M. Seligman & Co., Israeli law firm

== See also ==
- Selig (name)
- Seliger, Seeliger
- Zelig (disambiguation)
