= Zelig (name) =

- Gender: Male
- Language: Yiddish

Origin
- Meaning: Blessed

Other names
- Alternative spelling: Zeilig, Zellig, Zelik, Zelick, Selig
- Related names: Selig, Asher

Zelig (Yiddish: זעליג, Hebrew: זליג) is a masculine given name and surname, meaning "blessed" in Yiddish. Variants of the name include Zelik (Yiddish: זעליק) and Selig (Yiddish: סעליג). The name is traditionally paired with the Hebrew name Asher. Notable people with the name include:

== Given name ==
- Zelig Bardichever (1903–1937), Yiddish poet
- Zelig Reuven Bengis (1864–1953), rabbi
- Zelik Epstein (1914–2009), rabbi
- Zelig Eshhar (1941–2025), Israeli immunologist
- Zellig Harris (1909–1992), American linguist
- Zelig Kalmanovich (1885–1944), philologist, translator, and historian
- Zelig Mogulescu (1858–1914), actor in Yiddish theatre
- Zelig Newman (1788–1871), writer and educator
- Zelig Pliskin (born 1946), American rabbi
- Zelig Rabinovitch (born 1966), Israeli media personality
- Zelig Segal (1933–2015), Israeli artist
- Zelig Sharfstein (1928–2008), Chabad rabbi
- Zelig Shtorch (born 1946), Israeli athlete

== Surname ==
- Dariusz Zelig (born 1957), Polish basketball player
- Jack Zelig (1888–1912), American gangster
- Mirka Mora (1928–2018), née Zelik, Australian artist

== See also ==
- Seeliger
- Seligmann (disambiguation)
- Seligman (disambiguation)
- Zelikovitch
