= Seligmann (name) =

Seligmann (sometimes Seligman) is a surname.

People bearing the name include:

== The arts ==
- Adrian Seligman (1909–2003), British naval commando and writer
- Audrey Blackman (1907–1990, née Seligman), British sculptor and ceramicist
- Chris Seligman, a keyboardist in Canadian band Stars
- Daniel Seligman (1924–2009), American editor and columnist
- Ellen Seligman (1944–2016), American-Canadian literary editor
- Emma Seligman (born 1995), Canadian director and screenwriter
- Germain Seligman (1893–1978), French-born American art dealer based in New York
- Hilda Seligman (1882–1964), British scultor, author and campaigner
- Jacques Seligmann (1858–1923), antiquarian and art dealer active in Paris and New York
- Johann Michael Seligmann (1720–1762), German artist and engraver
- Kurt Seligmann (1900–1962), Swiss painter, writer
- Lincoln Seligman (born 1950), British artist
- Mariana Seligmann (born 1984), Argentinian actress
- Matthew Seligman (1955–2020), English musician
- Walter Herbert (conductor) (né Seligmann, 1898–1975), American conductor
- Werner Seligmann (1930–1998), architect, urban designer, and educator
- Seligmann Heller (1831–1890), Austrian poet and journalist

== Business, law, and politics ==
- Aron Elias Seligmann (1747–1824), German Jewish financier
- Arthur Seligman (1873–1933), American businessman and politician
- Edwin Robert Anderson Seligman (1861–1939), American economist
- Isaac Seligman (1834–1928), German-American merchant banker and philanthropist
- Isaac Newton Seligman (1855–1917), American banker and communal worker
- Jesse Seligman (1827–1894), German-American banker
- Joseph Seligman (né Seligmann, 1819–1880), a German-American banker, founder of J. & W. Seligman & Co.
- Madron Seligman (1918–2002), British politician
- Naomi O. Seligman, member of the bard of directors of the Oracle Corporation
- Nicole Seligman (born 1957), American attorney and corporate director
- Scott Seligman (born 1951), American real estate developer and bank founder
- Selig J. Seligman (1918–1969), American lawyer and film executive

== Science and education ==
- Charles Gabriel Seligman (né Seligmann, 1873–1940), British anthropologist
- George Seligman (1927–2024), American mathematician
- Joel Seligman (born 1950), tenth president of the University of Rochester
- Martin Seligman (born 1942), American psychologist and author, father of modern positive psychology movement

== Religion ==
- Seligman Baer (1825–1897), masoretic scholar, and an editor of the Hebrew Bible and of the Jewish liturgy
- Seligman Baer Bamberger (1807–1878), Talmudist and a leader of Orthodox Judaism in Germany

== Sportsmen ==
- Edgar Seligman (1867–1958), American-born British six-time champion and two-time Olympic fencing medalist
- Reade Seligmann, one of the three falsely accused students in 2006 Duke University lacrosse case
- Steve Seligman (born 1954), American stock car racing driver
