= Seeliger =

Seeliger is a name meaning "blessed man" in German and Yiddish. Notable people with the surname include:

- Hugo von Seeliger (1849–1924), German astronomer
- Rudolf Seeliger (1886–1965), German physicist
- Thomas Seeliger (born 1966), German footballer and coach
- Wolfgang Seeliger (born 1946), German choral conductor

== See also ==
- Seeliger effect
- Seeliger (crater)

Related surnames

- Seliger
- Selig (name)
- Seligmann
- Zelig (disambiguation)
