= Geoffrey Kirk =

British classical scholar (1921–2003)

Geoffrey Kirk DSC FBA
- Kirk in 1953 by Antony Barrington Brown
- Born: 3 December 1921; Nottingham, England
- Died: 10 March 2003 (aged 81); Rake, West Sussex, England
- Spouses: Barbara Traill (m. 1950; div. 1975); Kirsten Ricks (m. 1975)

Academic background
- Education: Clare College, Cambridge
- Influences: N. G. L. Hammond; Denys Page; Harry Sandbach

Academic work
- Discipline: Classics
- Institutions: Trinity Hall, Cambridge; Yale University; Bristol University; Trinity College, Cambridge
- Doctoral students: Nick Lowe
- Main interests: Ancient Greek literature
- Notable works: Heraclitus: the Cosmic Fragments, 1954; The Iliad: a Commentary, 1985–1993
- Influenced: Richard Janko; Nicholas Richardson

Geoffrey Stephen Kirk, DSC, FBA (3 December 1921 – 10 March 2003) was a British classicist who served as the 35th Regius Professor of Greek at the University of Cambridge. He published widely on pre-Socratic philosophy and the work of the Greek poet Homer, culminating in a six-volume philological commentary on the Iliad published between 1985 and 1993.

Born into a middle-class family in Nottingham, he began studying classics at Clare College, Cambridge but joined the Royal Navy during World War II. He was deployed to the Aegean Sea as part of the Levant Schooner Flotilla and distinguished himself through his command of modern Greek. His service, for which he was awarded the Distinguished Service Cross, became the basis for his 1997 memoir Towards The Aegean Sea.

Kirk began his career as a lecturer and fellow of Trinity Hall, Cambridge in the 1950s. He also held professorships at Yale and Bristol University. In 1974, having gained a reputation as a leading Hellenist through the publication of his first major study (Heraclitus: the Cosmic Fragments, 1954), he succeeded Denys Page as the Regius Professor of Greek at Cambridge. After his retirement in 1983, he dedicated himself to his Iliad commentary but began to suffer from depressive illness.

== Early life ==
Geoffrey Stephen Kirk was born in December 1921 in Nottingham. His parents were Frederic Kirk, an educational administrator at Northampton Polytechnic and World War I veteran, and his wife Enid. Having spent part of his childhood in the Hertfordshire town of Radlett, he was educated at the independent Rossall School in Lancashire. In 1939, he won a scholarship to study classics at Clare College, Cambridge.

== Military service and return to Cambridge ==
In 1941, after only one year at Cambridge University, Kirk volunteered to join the Royal Naval Volunteer Reserve. His supervisor at Cambridge was Robert Rattenbury, whom Hugh Lloyd-Jones later called "a sound scholar but by no means an inspiring teacher". When Kirk said he was leaving to join the Navy, Rattenbury remarked: "Good Heavens! Well, I don't suppose I shall be seeing you again!"

Kirk served in the Levant Schooner Flotilla, an Allied naval organisation operating in the Aegean Sea. He rose to command a caïque, one of the Aegean fishing boats which were used by the Allies to stage landings on the Greek coast. Having learnt some modern Greek, he distinguished himself through his communication with Greek resistance forces and was awarded the Distinguished Service Cross in August 1945. Later in life, he reflected on the events of his wartime service in a 1997 memoir entitled Towards The Aegean Sea.

After the End of World War II, Kirk returned to Cambridge to resume his studies towards the Classical Tripos. He was most influenced by his tutor at Clare College, the historian of ancient Greece N. G. L. Hammond, and by the Hellenist Harry Sandbach. In 1946, he graduated BA with First Class Honours.

== Career ==
=== Beginnings at Trinity Hall ===
Kirk's first academic position was a research fellowship at Trinity Hall, Cambridge. However, he spent much of his time away from the college. A stint at British School at Athens (1947–1948) was followed by a period as a Commonwealth Fund Fellow at Harvard University, lasting from 1949 to 1950. In 1950, Kirk married the artist Barbara Traill, with whom he had one daughter.

He then took up a permanent position at Cambridge. Working as an assistant lecturer in ancient Greek literature, he was elected a fellow of Trinity Hall. Unusually for his time, Kirk attained a series of promotions in his first decade as a tenured academic: he was made a university lecturer in 1952 and a reader in 1961. The 1950s and 1960s witnessed the publication of several monographs which helped to establish his international reputation as a scholar of archaic Greece: he edited the fragments of the philosopher Heraclitus (1954), wrote a study on the poems of Homer (1962), and, together with classicist John Raven, co-edited a volume on pre-Socratic philosophy (1958). He was elected a Fellow of the British Academy in 1959 at just thirty eight years of age.

=== Professorships in the United States and England ===
In 1965, Kirk returned to the United States and took up a professorship of classics at Yale University. He held this appointment until 1970. During this period, he also spent a year as the Sather Professor of Classical Literature at the University of California, Berkeley and delivered the 1968 Sather Classical Lectures entitled Myth: Its Meaning and Functions.

Having spent five years in North America, Kirk returned to the United Kingdom when offered the chair of Greek at the University of Bristol in 1971. However, his tenure did not last long: in 1973, Denys Page had retired from the Regius Chair of Greek at Cambridge. The following year, Kirk was elected to succeed Page and became the 35th holder of the chair. Trinity College, Cambridge duly admitted him to its fellowship. Having published the content of his Sather Lectures in 1970, his work on Greek literature continued with a translation of the Bacchae (1970) by the tragedian Euripides and a second monograph on Homer (Homer and the Oral Tradition, 1977). In 1979, he briefly returned to the United States to take up a distinguished visiting professorship at Tulane University.

In 1975, while serving as the Regius Professor, Kirk's marriage to his wife was dissolved. He then married Kirsten Ricks, the former wife of the literary critic Christopher Ricks, in September of the same year. Although the pair did not have any children, he acquired four stepchildren from Kirsten's first marriage.

== Retirement and death ==
Kirk retired from his teaching duties in 1982. Continuing for some time to live at their house in Woodbridge, Suffolk, he and his wife later moved to Bath and finally settled in Fittleworth, West Sussex. Much of his retirement was taken up by work on a large-scale commentary on Homer's Iliad. Intended to be the crowning achievement of his academic career, the book was published in six volumes between 1985 and 1993. While he was the sole author of the first two volumes, the remaining ones were published in co-operation with fellow classicists Mark W. Edwards, Richard Janko, Nicholas Richardson, and John B. Hainsworth.

In his retirement, Kirk increasingly suffered from depressive illness, leading to a "stressful and unsettled" life. He died from heart failure in March 2003 in a nursing home at Rake, West Sussex. He was survived by his second wife Kirsten, his daughter and four stepchildren.

== Legacy ==
Kirks's reputation as a classical scholar was based initially on his work on pre-Socratic philosophy. His first book (Heraclitus: the Cosmic Fragments, 1954) was well received among the scholars community. Gregory Vlastos, a leading interpreter of Plato, remarked that it "compell[ed] one to reconsider many things one has previously taken for granted". Co-authored with John Raven, his 1959 book The Presocratic Philosophers became, in the words of Hellenist Hugh Lloyd-Jones, "an invaluable substitute" for previous treatments of the topic.

From about 1960, his research focus lay with the Homeric epics. In this area, he was under the influence of his Cambridge predecessor Denys Page who had held that the poems were products of an oral tradition of poetry. Kirk's Songs of Homer (1962) presented a more nuanced expression of Page's views and treated the poems' transition from oral to written forms. The comprehensive commentary on the Iliad published in his retirement was praised by The Guardian as "coherent [...] and wide-ranging in interpretation". However, it has been criticised by Lloyd-Jones for adhering to oralist theories, which had become outdated by the time of the commentary's publication.

== Selected publications ==
- Heraclitus (1954). Heraclitus: the Cosmic Fragments. Cambridge: Cambridge University Press.
- The Presocratic Philosophers. edited with John Raven. Cambridge: Cambridge University Press. 1959.
- Kirk, G. S. (1962). The Songs of Homer. Cambridge: Cambridge University Press.
- Euripides (1970). Bacchae. Englewood Cliffs: Prentice Hall. ISBN 978-0-13-055285-3.
- Kirk, Geoffrey Stephen (1970). Myth: Its Meaning and Functions in Ancient and Other Cultures. University of California Press. ISBN 978-0-521-09802-1.
- The Iliad: a Commentary. ed. 6 vol. Cambridge: Cambridge University Press. 1985–1993. ISBN 978-0-521-28171-3.

== Bibliography ==
- Easterling, P. E. (2009). "Kirk, Geoffrey Stephen". In Cannadine, David (ed.). Oxford Dictionary of National Biography. Oxford. doi:10.1093/ref:odnb/89815. ISBN 978-0-19-861412-8. (subscription required)
- Lloyd-Jones, Hugh (2004). "Geoffrey Kirk". Proceedings of the British Academy (124): 141–8.
- Mund-Dopchie, Monique (1995). "Brian Hainsworth, The Iliad : a Commentary. Vol. ΙII : Books 9- 12. Nicholas Richardson, The Iliad : a Commentary. Vol. VI : Books 21–24" (PDF). L'Antiquité classique.
- Willcock, M. M. (1993). "Richard Janko: The Iliad: a Commentary, Vol. IV: Books 13–16. Mark W. Edwards: The Iliad: a Commentary, Vol. V: Books 17–20" (PDF). The Classical Review. 43 (63): 1–3. doi:10.1017/S0009840X00285491. S2CID 246878230. (subscription required)

Academic offices
Preceded by Denys Page	Regius Professor of Greek Cambridge University; 1974 - 1982	Succeeded by Eric Handley
