= Bust of Haile Selassie =

Bust in Wimbledon, London

Coordinates: 51.42459°N 0.23129°W

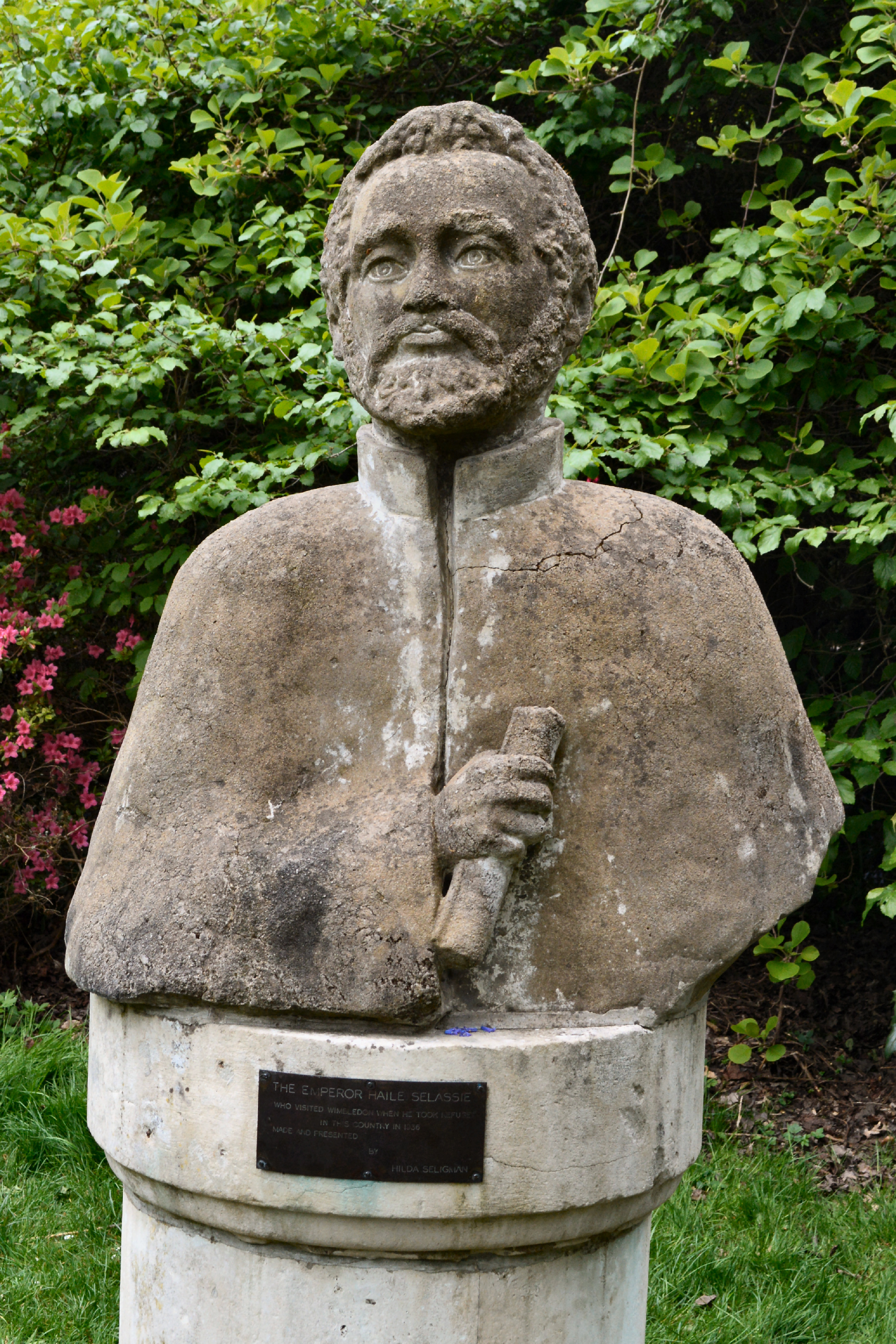
- Artist: Hilda Seligman
- Completion date: 1957
- Location: Wimbledon, London

A bust of the Ethiopian emperor Haile Selassie formerly stood in Cannizaro Park in Wimbledon Common, London. A work of the sculptor Hilda Seligman, it was destroyed in June 2020.

== History ==
During the 1930s, Ethiopia came into conflict with the Italian dictator Benito Mussolini, who sought to avenge his country for its losses during the First Italo-Ethiopian War. In 1935 Italy invaded Ethiopia, starting the Second Italo-Ethiopian War. As a result of the invasion, Haile Selassie was exiled to the United Kingdom.

In 1936, while in exile, Selassie spent time at Seligman's family home. He returned to Ethiopia in 1941, and when Seligman's home was demolished in 1957, she installed the bust in Cannizaro Park.

The bust was a popular attraction and pilgrimage site for followers of the Rastafarian movement.

=== Destruction ===
The bust was destroyed by a group of around 100 protestors on 30 June 2020, in what was believed to have been a reaction to the killing of the Ethiopian protest singer Hachalu Hundessa in Addis Ababa the previous day.

== See also ==
- Actions against memorials in the United Kingdom during the George Floyd protests
- List of public art formerly in London
