= Selig =

Selig may refer to:

- Selig (name)
- Selig (band), a Hamburg-based German grunge band
- Selig, Ohio, a community in the United States
- Selig Polyscope Company, an American motion picture company founded by William Selig
- Selig's Wild Animal Farm (~1912–1914) in Santa Monica and its successor, Selig Zoo (1915-~1935), in Los Angeles, California

== See also ==
- Zelig (disambiguation)
