= Alex Bilmes =

British journalist

Alex Bilmes is a British journalist. He was the editor of the British edition of Esquire magazine until February 2025

Formerly features director at British GQ and contributing editor at British Vogue, he has also written for newspapers and magazines including The Observer, The Spectator, The Sunday Times, The Financial Times and The Independent. He has made numerous appearances on TV and radio.

In 2006 Bilmes was named PPA Consumer Magazine Writer of the Year and MJA Interviewer of the Year.

In 2007 he was Highly Commended by the PPA, again in the Writer of the Year category.

Bilmes writes mostly about the arts, books, the entertainment industry, travel and fashion, though he has also been published on sport, politics, technology and more. He began his journalism career as a reporter on the Richmond and Twickenham Times newspaper group in west London in 1994.

Bilmes was born on 19 January 1973. He lives in London. He was privately educated at Rokeby preparatory school and then Epsom College. He then gained a BA in English from Goldsmiths College in London.
