= Jean Seaton =

British historian

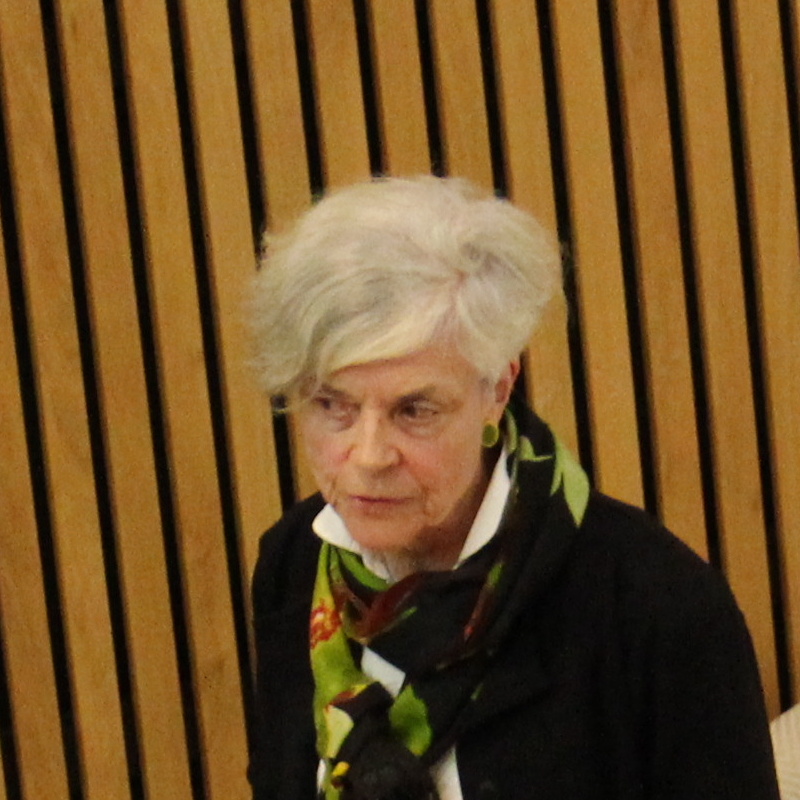
- Born: 6 March 1947 (age 79)
- Spouse: Ben Pimlott

Academic work
- Discipline: history
- Institutions: University of Westminster

Jean Seaton (born 6 March 1947) is Professor of Media History at the University of Westminster and the Official Historian of the BBC. She is the Director of the Orwell Prize and on the editorial board of Political Quarterly. She is the widow of Ben Pimlott, the British historian.

== Orwell Prize ==
Following Bernard Crick's retirement as Chair of the judges in 2006, Seaton took the position of Director of the Orwell Prize. Together with Martin Moore of the Media Standards Trust, Seaton led the launch of the prize's website in 2008 and the involvement of the prize with literary festivals.

During her tenure, Seaton has separated the role of Director from a judging role, increased the number of judges of the prize, and introduced longlists for the prize in addition to the already-existing shortlists.

== Pinkoes and Traitors ==
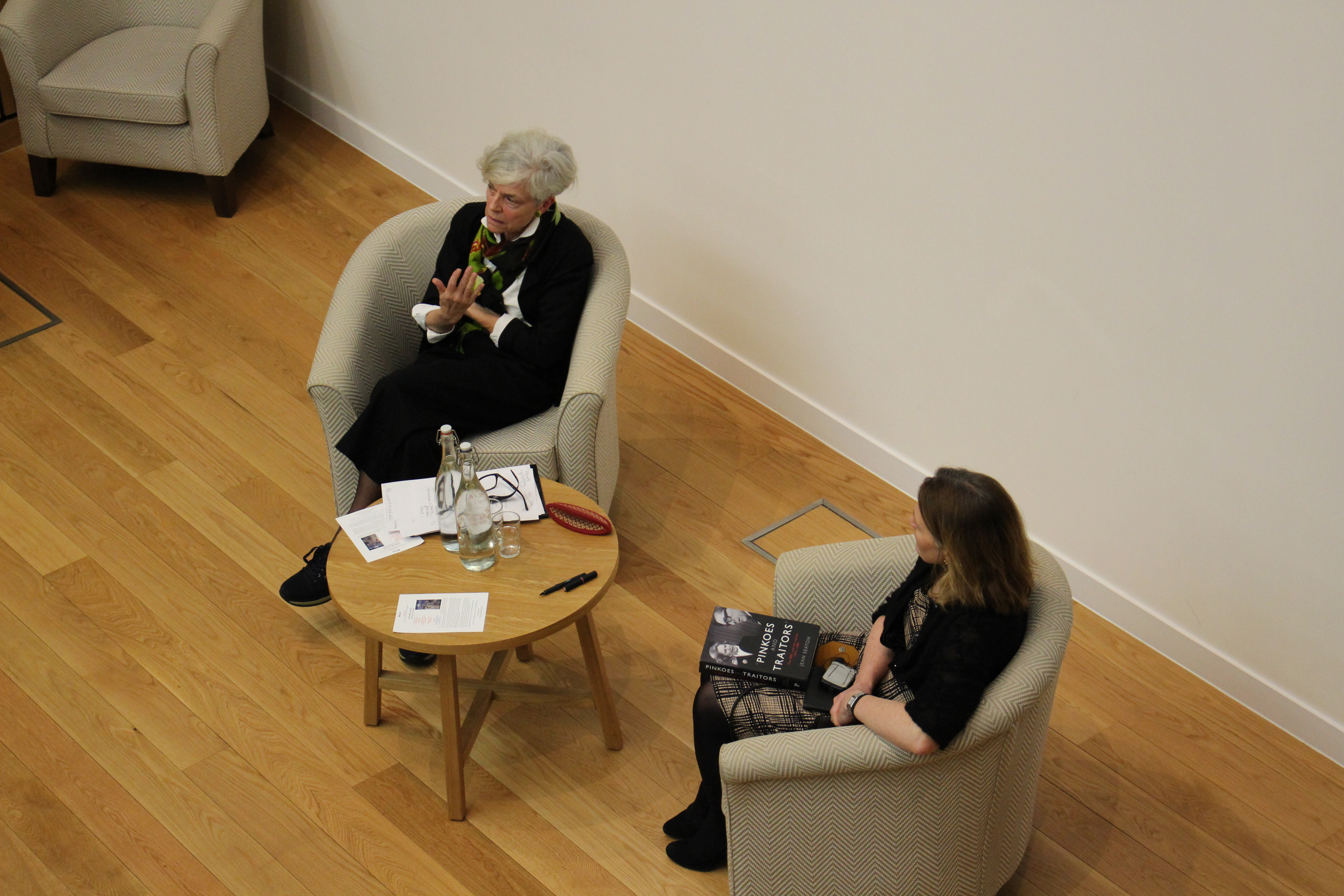
Jean Seaton (left) in conversation with Helen Margetts (right) at Seaton's talk, "The History and Future of the BBC" at Mansfield College, Oxford in January 2020.

Her volume of the official history of the BBC, Pinkoes and Traitors: the BBC and the Nation 1970-1987, was published by Profile Books in February 2015. Pinkoes and Traitors received some positive reviews while several other articles have been published criticising factual errors and a perceived lack of objectivity.

In The Financial Times, Chris Patten reviewed the book very favourably, writing that "Seaton reminds us what [the BBC] stands for at its best (and worst) in a book that is both hugely entertaining and wise". Libby Purves in The Times referred to Pinkoes and Traitors as "epic" and described it as a "scholarly but eye-poppingly riveting history", while Dominic Sandbrook refers to the book as having "all the detail and clarity you expect from an institutional history" in a more mixed review in The Sunday Times.

Bonnie Greer, writing in The Independent, found Seaton’s book to be a "densely argued and magisterial account", adding: "Seaton, who is the director of the Orwell Prize, writes in prose which would have impressed Orwell himself. Unsentimental, robust, devoid of jargon and clear as a bell".

In The Guardian, Seumas Milne – son of former BBC director general Alasdair Milne, whose ousting in 1987 is a key moment in Seaton’s book – praised the author’s "evocative detail" but criticised the book for its take on his father, finding that "in her enthusiasm to show that the collision of the 1980s was as much the fault of BBC obduracy and incompetence as government ideology and menace, she tips over into rewriting history. There is a no man’s land between journalism, subject to libel law and instant challenge, and established history – and it’s in that land of factual licence that Pinkoes and Traitors sits". He added: "The book is littered with inaccuracies and demonstrable distortions: from names and dates to the self-serving spin of those who have survived to tell the tale".

David Elstein has also found numerous errors in the text. A long paragraph detailing errors in names concludes with Elstein noting: "Two of those whose names are mis-spelled are amongst the twelve people thanked for reading drafts of the book". His review finishes by stating, "Yet surely what we need from a professor of media history is a degree of accuracy, respect for the facts, ability to check detail, detachment and sound judgement, all of which Pinkoes and Traitors so lamentably lacks. Let us hope her successor as BBC historian serves us better." Responding to Elstein's criticisms in her own article for openDemocracy, Seaton acknowledged:

"Elstein does point to a number of inaccuracies in my book; they are my responsibility, and deeply regretted. […] Independently, I owe Stewart Purvis an apology. Just after Lady Diana’s engagement, tabloid papers were blazoned with pictures of her in a low-cut dress which they said exposed a nipple. ITN, edited by him, ran a story showing that it was the shadow of her bouquet falling on her chest – not a nipple. In the last edit of the book I garbled the story and the key word ‘not’ was cut. I welcome the opportunity to correct these errors, and others, in a revised edition of the book this autumn".

However, she challenged at length other aspects of Elstein’s article, saying "The wonderful thing about David Elstein’s ferocious review of Pinkoes and Traitors is that his agenda, pursued single-mindedly for over 30 years, is so transparent. He wants the BBC to be smaller or broken up or reorganised. He is in favour of anything that damages the BBC and crushes its universality. Above all he wants it financed by individual subscription for specific services. This would be the end of the BBC. His urge to say ITV was always better, first, superior, pristine in the past, is in his hands another aspect of the same argument". Elstein has since written a further openDemocracy article, rejecting Seaton’s claims about him.

The anonymous reviewer in Private Eye concurred with Milne and Elstein about the errors, saying: "According to this, the sixth volume of the official history of the BBC, Blue Peter celebrated its 15th anniversary in 1979 (it was the 21st anniversary), the IRA hunger strikes took place in 1982 (1981) […] while the controversial 1980 documentary Death of a Princess is called a “Channel 4 programme” (it was ITV – Channel 4 did not exist until 1982)." The magazine’s reviewer noted: "It would be bad enough if a serious factual error on practically every page was Seaton’s only offence, but that’s not all. In the acknowledgements, she says 'It was a challenge to attempt to meet the BBC’s standards of hard impartiality'. It seems to have been so challenging she gave up trying, and started editorialising like mad." The review concluded: "The book is littered with egregious howlers that wouldn’t last half an hour on Wikipedia. That this is the official history of a major institution written by a supposedly respected academic simply won’t do. She thanks the Arts and Humanities Research Council, the British Academy and the Leverhulme Trust for funding her research. They should all ask for a refund."

== Editorial style ==
In Power Without Responsibility (2010) [1988], she wrote of Marmaduke Hussey's chairmanship of the BBC quite negatively, stating that he "brutally dismissed one director general, shabbily pushed aside the next, and appointed the third, John Birt, without even advertising the job or considering other candidates." And quoting without attribution a critic as describing his treating of the BBC 'rather as if he had owned it'. In 2021's Guardians of Public Value, she wrote of him to have been an "excellent" chair and to have "helped creatively to change [the BBC's] direction", only describing his initial appointment as politically motivated.

== Selected works ==
- ed. The Media in British Politics (Avebury, 1987)
- Politics and the Media in Britain: Harlots and Prerogatives at the Turn of the Millennium (Wiley, 1998)
- ed. The Media of Conflict: War Reporting and Representations of Ethnic Violence (Zed Books, 1999)
- Carnage and the Media: the Making and Breaking of News about Violence (Allen Lane, 2005)
- (with John Lloyd) What Can Be Done? Making the Media and Politics Better (Wiley, 2006)
- (with James Curran) Power Without Responsibility: the Press and Broadcasting in Britain (Routledge, 7th edition 2009)

== Works cited ==
- Curran, James; Seaton, Jean (2018). Power Without Responsibility. Abingdon, Oxon New York, NY: Routledge. ISBN 978-0-415-71042-8. (sections attributed in the index)
- Seaton, Jean (2021). "The BBC: Guardian of Public Understanding". Guardians of Public Value. Cham: Springer International Publishing. pp. 87–110. doi:10.1007/978-3-030-51701-4_4. ISBN 978-3-030-51700-7. PMC 7658670.
