= Rosemary Grimble =

- Born: January 1917; Tarawa
- Died: 22 April 2013
- Occupations: Painter, photographer, writer, illustrator
- Spouse: Adrian Seligman
- Father: Arthur Grimble

Rosemary Anne Grimble Seligman (January 1917 – 22 April 2013) was a British illustrator, artist, writer, and photographer.

Rosemary Grimble was born in January 1917 in Tarawa, the second of four children of Sir Arthur Grimble, Resident Commissioner of the Gilbert and Ellice Islands. She was the first English child born in the Gilbert Islands and learned Gilbertese as her first language. She studied art at the Central School of Art in London. She worked as a freelance book and magazine illustrator and also served as an art editor for the magazines Housewife and Picture Post.

== Personal life ==
In 1950 she married writer and naval officer Adrian Seligman. They had two sons.

== Bibliography ==
- The Turkish People of Cyprus by Adrian Seligman. Prologue and photographs by Rosemary Grimble. London: Press Attaché’s Office, Turkish Embassy, 1956.
- Return to the Island by Arthur Grimble, 1957
- I Was a Savage by Prince Modupe, 1958.
- Treasure Island by Robert Louis Stevenson, 1959.
- From Corals to Cunarders by L. E. Snellgrove, 1962.
- Alexander the Great by Naomi Mitchison, 1964.
- Jonothon and Large, 1965.
- Migrations, Myth, and Magic From the Gilbert Islands: Early Writings of Sir Arthur Grimble. Edited and illustrated by Rosemary Grimble. London and Boston: Routledge & Kegan Paul, 1972
- How Many Miles to Babylon? by Paula Fox, 1972
- The Thief Catchers and Other Stories from Ethiopia, 1972
- The Pauper's Homemaking Book by Jocasta Innes, 1976.
- Magic in the South Seas: Spells. Collected by Sir Arthur Grimble; edited and illustrated by Rosemary Grimble.
