= Levant Schooner Flotilla =

WWII allied naval organisation

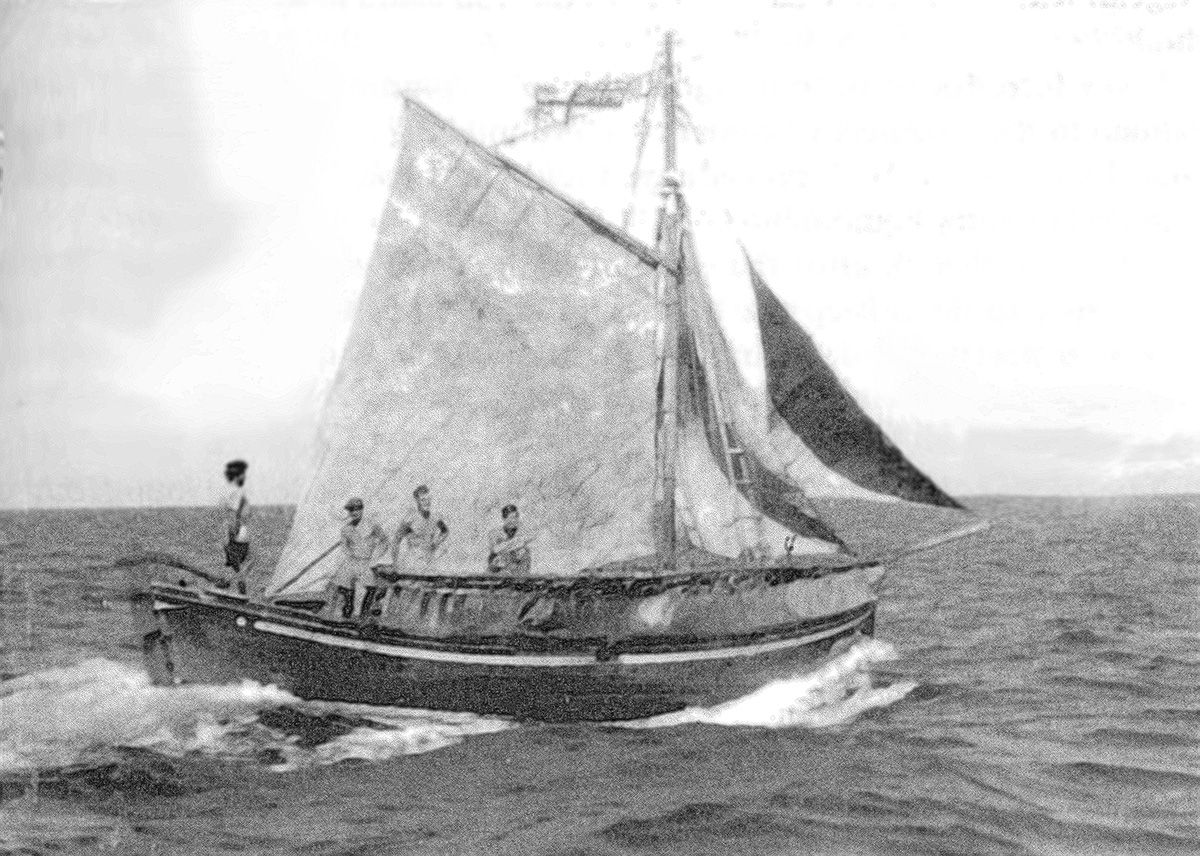
Caique sailed by the Levant Schooner Flotilla, World War II.

The Levant Schooner Flotilla was an Allied naval organisation during World War II that facilitated covert and irregular military operations in the Aegean Sea from 1942–1945. It was primarily organised by the British Royal Navy and consisted of a series of commandeered caïques, or local schooners, manned by British sailors, special forces, and Greek volunteers.

== World War II in the Aegean ==
The Levant Schooner Flotilla (LSF) was formed by the Royal Navy from requisitioned or abandoned caïques to supplement its handful of motor and high-speed launches opposing German forces in the Nazi-occupied Aegean Sea. The LSF was led by Lieutenant-Commander Adrian Seligman, who had circumnavigated the globe in a windjammer before the war. The Flotilla numbered about ten ships in September 1943, though at various points it was able to field only a handful. Caïques typically had 5 to 6 man crews and were armed with 20 mm cannon, Browning machine guns and Vickers aircraft machine guns. The caïques often operated under cover of darkness, landing or picking up commandos, rescuing partisans, and intercepting or raiding small German forces. Many of the ships were powered by Matilda tank engines and used long-range radios taken from Kittyhawk fighters.

The LSF facilitated raids by the British Long Range Desert Group against German forces on the Islands of Kithnos and Levitha during the Dodecanese Campaign in the autumn of 1943 and was involved in fighting over Leros shortly thereafter. Among those who served in the LSF are Roger Durnford and British scholar Geoffrey Kirk.

== See also ==
- Military history of Greece during World War II
- Mediterranean Theater of Operations

== Bibliography ==
- Holland, Jeffrey (1988). The Aegean Mission: Allied Operations in the Dodecanese, 1943. Contributions in Military Studies No. 77. New York: Greenwood Press. ISBN 978-0-31-326283-8.
- Koburger, Charles (1999). Wine-Dark, Blood Red Sea: Naval Warfare in the Aegean, 1941–1946. Westport, CT: Praeger. ISBN 978-0-31-337130-1.
- Smith, Peter; Walker, Edwin (2008) [1974]. War in the Aegean: The Campaign for the Eastern Mediterranean in WWII. Stackpole Military History. Mechanicsburg, PA: Stackpole Books. ISBN 978-0-8117-3519-3.
