= Sussex West (European Parliament constituency) =

Former European Parliament constituency

- European Parliament constituency
- Boundary within South East England (1979-1984)
- Member state: United Kingdom
- Created: 1979
- Dissolved: 1994
- MEPs: 1

Prior to its uniform adoption of proportional representation in 1999, the United Kingdom used first-past-the-post for the European elections in England, Scotland and Wales. The European Parliament constituencies used under that system were smaller than the later regional constituencies and only had one Member of the European Parliament each. The constituency of Sussex West (renamed as West Sussex in 1984) was one of them.

Boundary within South East England and London (1984-1994)

== Boundaries ==
1979-1984: Arundel; Chichester; Havant and Waterloo; Horsham and Crawley; Mid Sussex; Shoreham; Worthing.

1984-1994: Arundel; Chichester; Crawley; Horsham; Mid Sussex; Shoreham; Worthing.

== MEPs ==
Elected	Member	Party
1979	Madron Seligman	Conservative
1994	Constituency abolished	

== Election results ==
European Parliament election, 1979: Sussex West
Party	Candidate	Votes	%	±%
Conservative	Madron Seligman	131,077	65.9	
Liberal	Dr James M. M. Walsh	35,593	17.9	
Labour	B. J. Whipp	26,894	13.5	
United Against the Common Market	L. N. Vince	5,303	2.7	
Majority		95,484	48.0	
Turnout		198,867	35.3	
Conservative win (new seat)				

European Parliament election, 1984: Sussex West
Party	Candidate	Votes	%	±%
Conservative	Madron Seligman	104,257	58.7	−7.2
Liberal	Dr James M. M. Walsh	46,755	26.3	+8.4
Labour	Gareth C. Rees	22,857	12.8	−0.7
Ecology	David Aherne	3,847	2.2	New
Majority		57,502	32.4	
Turnout		177,716	33.4	
Conservative hold		Swing		

European Parliament election, 1989: Sussex West
Party	Candidate	Votes	%	±%
Conservative	Madron Seligman	95,821	47.4	−11.3
Green	I. F. N. (Nick) Bagnall	49,588	24.5	+22.3'"`UNIQ−−ref−00000016−QINU`"'
Labour	Michael J. Shrimpton	32,006	15.8	+3.0
SLD	Dr James M. M. Walsh	24,855	12.3	−14.0
Majority		46,233	22.9	−9.5
Turnout		202,270	36.5	+3.1
Conservative hold		Swing		
