= Zeljković =

Zeljković (Serbian Cyrillic: Зељковић) is a surname found in Croatia, Bosnia and Serbia. Notable people with the surname include:

- Mladen Zeljković (born 1987), Serbian football player
- Nives Zeljković (born 1981), Croatian model, singer and writer
- Samir Zeljković (born 1997), Bosnian football player
- Suad Zeljković (born 1960), Bosnian politician
- Vico Zeljković (born 1988), Bosnian businessman and football executive
- Zoran Zeljković (born 1980), Slovenian footballer and manager

== See also ==
- Zelikovitch
