= Rokeby Preparatory School =

Rokeby School

Location
- George Road; Kingston upon Thames, Greater London, KT2 7PB; England; 51.4175°N 0.27068°W

Information
- Type: Preparatory school
- Motto: Smart, Skilful and Kind (until 2008 "Aemulus studiorum in et laborum")
- Established: 1877
- Founder: Charles D. Olive, M.A. (Oxon.)
- Department for Education URN: 102612 Tables
- Headmaster: Jason Peck
- Staff: c.45
- Age: 4 to 13
- Enrolment: 400
- Houses: Bazelgette, Galsworthy, Moody and Olive
- Website: http://www.rokebyschool.co.uk

Rokeby School is an independent all-boys preparatory day school in Kingston upon Thames, London. Its headmaster is Jason Peck. The school offers an education from 4 to 13 years through the integration of a pre-preparatory school and a preparatory school. The pre-prep school was known as Junior Rokeby until 2008 when headmaster Jason Peck unified the schools under one name and uniform, at the same time abolishing the senior school's traditional Latin motto ("Aemulus studiorum et laborum", from Cicero meaning "the rival of pursuits and labours") in favour of a four-word English one.

== History ==
=== Wimbledon (1877–1966) ===
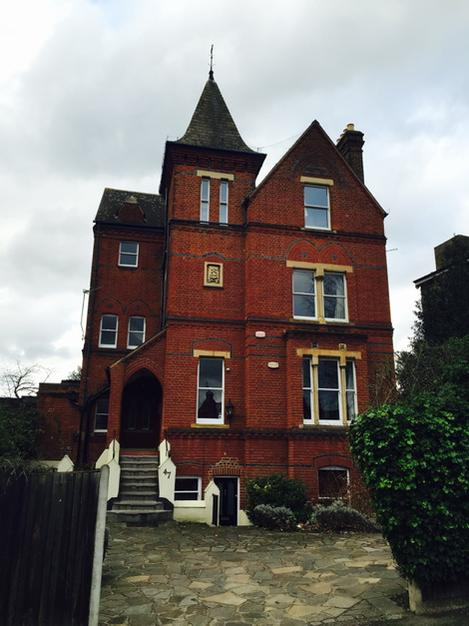
"Helmsley", Wimbledon – the site where the school first stood (1877–79)

The school was founded in Wimbledon on 18 September 1877, originally at "Helmsley" (no. 47, Woodhayes Road), by Charles Olive, an Oxford graduate. The Helmsley site is just across the road from the current location of KCS, Wimbledon, which at the time of Rokeby's founding had yet to move from its central London campus. In the first term, however, not a single pupil appeared. In the second term the first boy enrolled (Charles J. Saunders), who later won a scholarship to Merchant Taylors' and continued onto St John's College, Oxford. By the end of the first year there were 15 boys attending the school. A year later numbers had increased sufficiently to warrant a larger premises, so the school was moved to another house known as "Rokeby" (at no. 17, The Downs) in 1879 – a site now occupied by Hall School Wimbledon.

"Rokeby", No. 17 The Downs, Wimbledon (1879–1966)

When the Association of Preparatory Schools was founded in 1892 (a precursor to the current IAPS), Rokeby was one of the first members.

=== Kingston (1966–present) ===
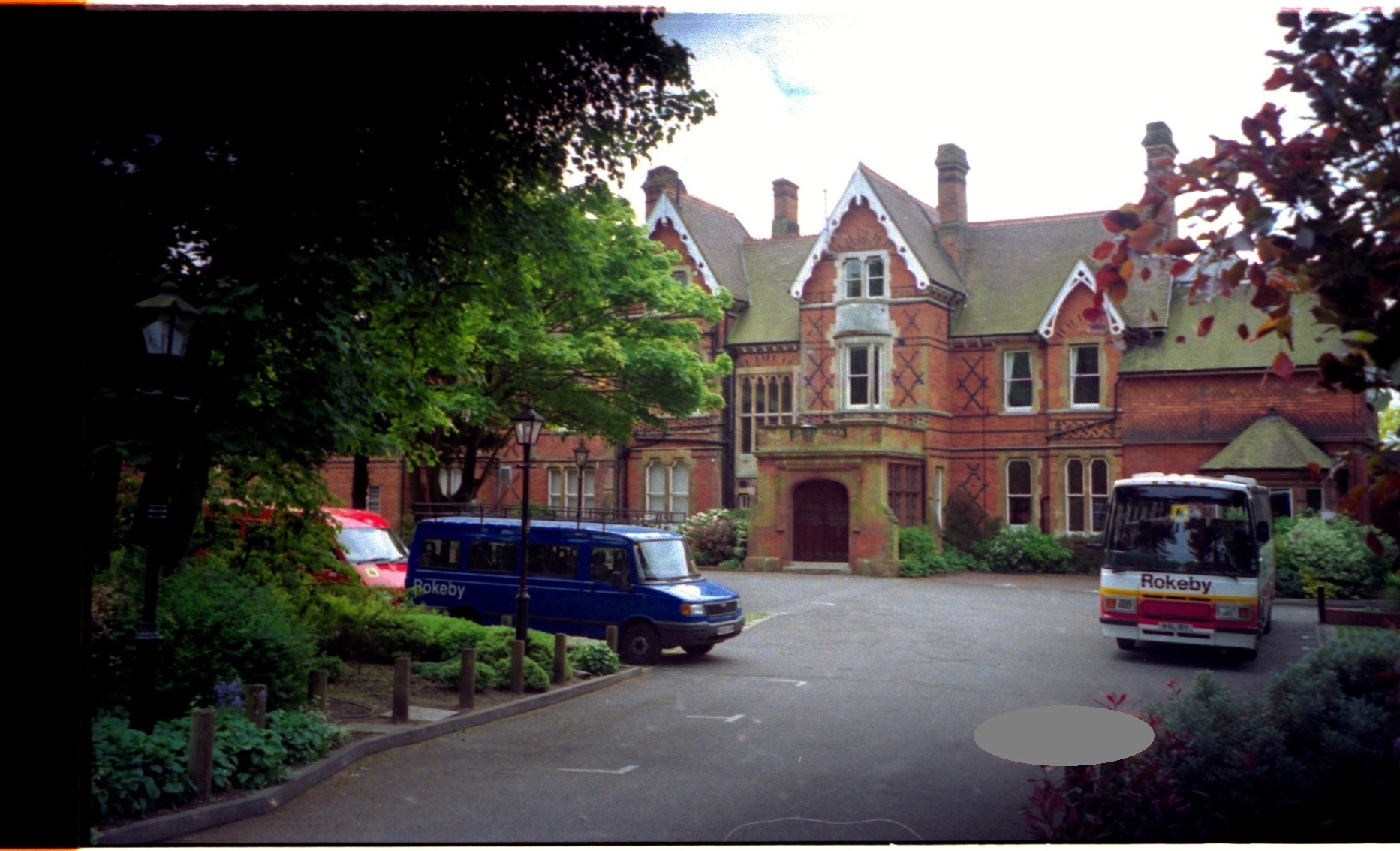
"Rokeby", Kingston: the school's current site (1966–present)

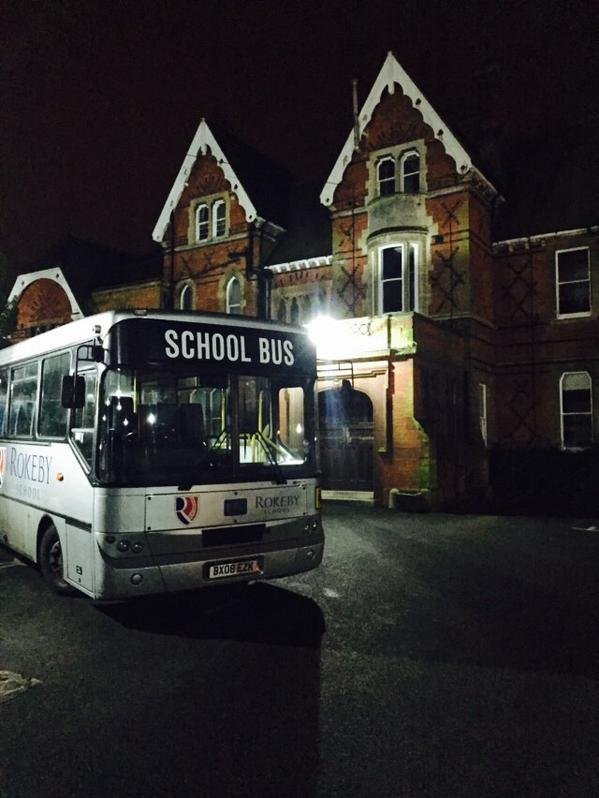
Rokeby, Kingston: the school's current site (1966–present)

In 1965 the then owner of the school stated his intent to close it, and a group of parents decided that it should be rescued. Rokeby Educational Trust Limited, a charity, was set up in 1966 to establish a successor school on its current site in George Road, Kingston. The George Road building (formerly known as "Coombe Croft") was one of a number of houses on George Road that had been owned by the Galsworthy family (whose members included John Galsworthy, author of The Forsyte Saga). Although by this date it was no longer residential, the buildings were still largely laid out as a country house. Over the years, significant investments have been made. First, there was major conversion work in the main house, then the building of the hall and science block, and a kitchen. The 1990s saw the rebuilding of the pre-prep accommodation, followed by the art wing and improved music facilities at the beginning of this decade. There has also been a significant refurbishment of the library, dining room and office accommodation, and a major investment in enhancing IT capabilities in recent years. The new Lower School Building comprising 6 classrooms, a performing arts hall and outdoor play space for the junior boys was officially opened by HRH Princess Alexandra on 16 October 2013.

For many years, the school made use of external sports facilities that were hired from year to year. After nearly 10 years of searching, the school bought its own sports fields in Worcester Park in 2003, some 10 minutes from the school, where a new pavilion was built. The motto of the school is "Smart, Skilful and Kind", which was coined by headmaster Jason Peck when he took over in 2007. Peck had been deputy headmaster to Michael Siegel, who authored a textbook, Latin: A Fresh Approach. There are four houses to which students belong: Bazelgette, Galsworthy, Moody and Olive.

A book by Peter Wicker, headmaster 1968–85, charting the history of the school's first 125 years (1877–2002), was published in late 2009: Rokeby: the first 125 years.

It purchased sports fields in Tolworth in the early 2000s following the schools expansion

== Fees ==
School fees per term for the 2024/25 academic year are as follows:

- Reception - Year 2: £6,932
- Years 3 and 4: £8,114
- Years 5-8: £8,632

== Headmasters ==
- Charles Daniel Olive, M.A. (Oxon.), founder and first headmaster (1877–1909)
- Gabriel F. Olive, M.A. & Geoffrey R. Batterbury, M.A. (1909–39)
- John Aldrich Olive, M.A. (1939–1941, 1945–1953) & H.V. Fisher (1943–66)
- C.P. Kingdon (1966–68)
- Peter F. S. Wicker (1968–85)
- Roy M. Moody, Cantab. (1985–99) – former housemaster of Holman House, Epsom College
- Michael K. Seigel, Oxon. (1999–2007) – former head of classics, Colet Court (1976–1987) and author of Latin: A fresh approach
- Jason R. Peck (2007–present)

== Associated with Rokeby ==
=== Governors of Rokeby ===
- Prof. Kenneth V. Jones, British composer and a former governor of the school

== Notable Old Rokebeians ==
=== Military ===
- Ian Willoughby Bazalgette, posthumously awarded the Victoria Cross for bravery in World War II; great-grandson of Sir Joseph Bazalgette
- Malcolm Munthe, British soldier, writer and curator; son of Dr Axel Munthe
- Colonel George Digby Thompson, CBE, MC, TD
- Mark Urban, military historian and BBC military correspondent
- Adrian Seligman, British sailor, writer, and soldier in the Second World War

=== Science and academia ===
- Prof. George Coulouris, computer scientist
- Prof. Ben Pimlott, British historian and political biographer

=== Law ===
- Sir Nigel George Davidson, CBE (1873–1961), Judge of the High Court, Sudan; also Deputy Chairman of Governing Body of Charterhouse School

=== Politics/government ===
- George Bridges, Baron Bridges of Headley, MBE, government minister, former head of Quiller Consultants (an influential Conservative Party lobbying firm); grandson of Edward Ettingdene Bridges, 1st Baron Bridges, and great-grandson of Robert Bridges
- Sir Victor Goodhew, British politician
- Sir Henry Monck-Mason Moore, GCMG Governor-General and Commander-in-Chief, Ceylon (1948–49)
- Madron Seligman, Member of the European Parliament (Conservative)

=== Education ===
- Sir Claude Aurelius Elliott, Headmaster of Eton College, 1933–1949; only child of Sir Charles Alfred Elliott, Lieutenant-Governor of Bengal
- Tim Gardam, Principal of St Anne's College, Oxford, 2004–2016

=== Literature ===
- Robert Graves, novelist and poet; son of Alfred Perceval Graves, Anglo-Irish poet, songwriter and school inspector (HMI); grandson of Bishop Charles Graves
- Charles Patrick Graves, journalist and writer - brother of Robert.
- Nick Taussig, novelist and film producer

=== Theology ===
- The Reverend Canon Dr Gavin Ashenden, theologian, author, broadcaster and columnist. Former Chaplain to HM The Queen

=== Performing arts/media ===
- Richard Briers, English actor
- Patrick Marber, English comedian, playwright, director, puppeteer, actor and screenwriter
- James Marriott (author), film critic and writer
- Oliver Reed (né Robert Oliver Reed), actor; grandson of actor and stage manager Sir Herbert Beerbohm Tree
- Simon Treves, English actor, director and writer; son of Frederick Treves (actor) and great-great nephew of Sir Frederick Treves, surgeon to King Edward VII
- Stuart Urban, film/television director
- Alex Bilmes, journalist

=== Music ===
- Inglis Gundry, English composer, novelist, musicologist, music pedagogue and writer

=== Sport ===
- Buzzer Hadingham (1915-2004); Chairman of the All England Lawn Tennis and Croquet Club
- Shiggy Konno, OBE, Chairman of the Japan Rugby Football Union
- Harry Glover, England sevens rugby player

=== Medicine ===
- Prof. Digby Tantam, British psychiatrist and professor of psychotherapy

=== Archaeology ===
- Sir Max Mallowan (1904–78), archaeologist and husband of Dame Agatha Christie. He said of Rokeby in his memoirs, "I do not think that I received a better education anywhere and spent at least two years marking time at my public school thereafter."

=== City of London ===
- Sir Harry Twyford, Lord Mayor of London (1937–38)

== Cultural references ==
The school at Wimbledon was captured in a drawing named "White Lilies" by the artist Alfred Parsons

Hugo Cole's children's opera The Asses' Ears, was written for the school in 1950.
