= Madron Seligman =

British politician (1918–2002)

Madron Seligman CBE
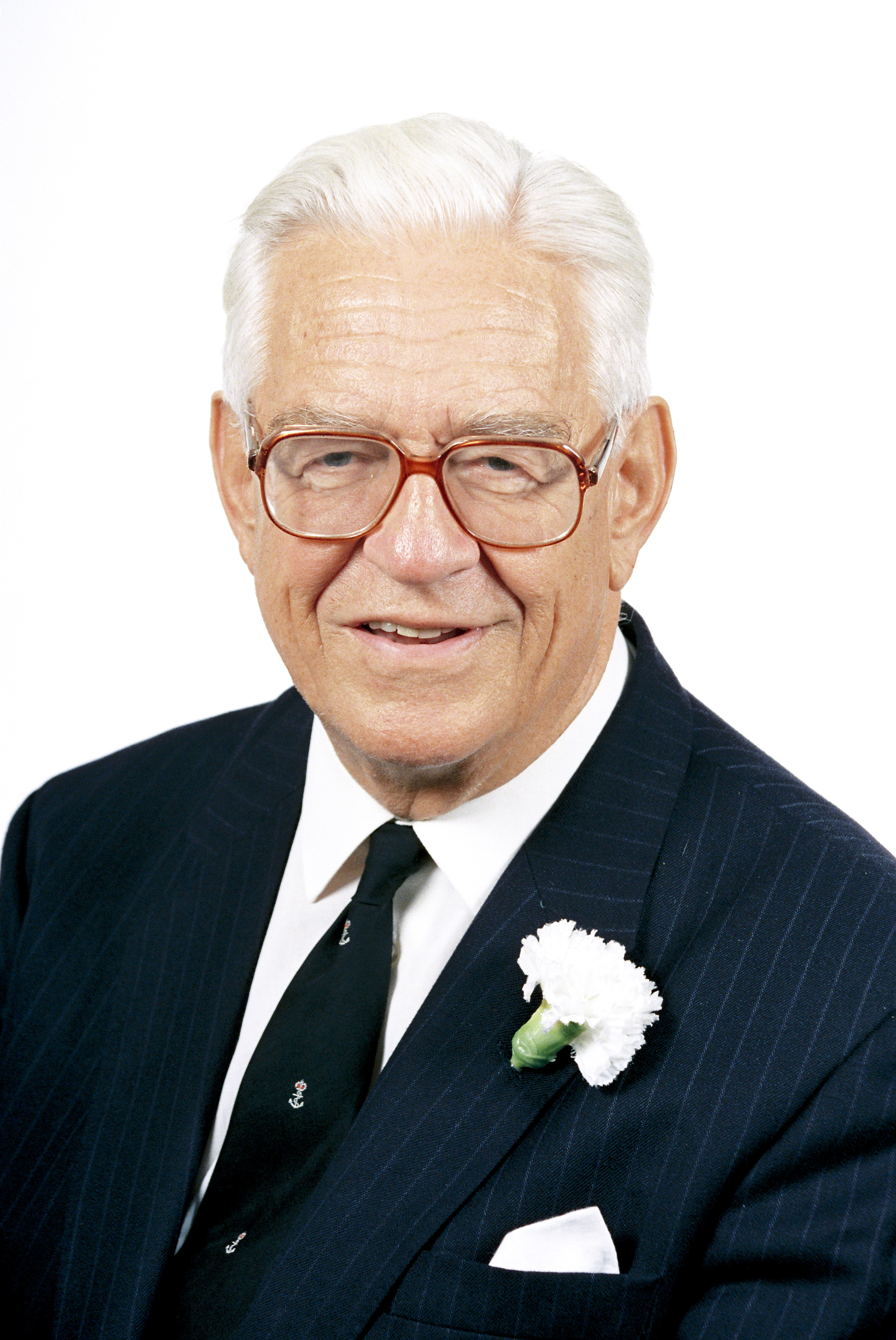
- European Parliament portrait

Member of the European Parliament for Sussex West
- In office 7 June 1979 – 9 June 1994
- Preceded by: Constituency created
- Succeeded by: Constituency abolished

Personal details
- Born: 10 November 1918 Leatherhead, Surrey, England
- Died: 9 July 2002 (aged 83)
- Party: Conservative
- Spouse: Nancy-Joan Marks (m. 1947)
- Children: 4
- Education: Rokeby Preparatory School; Harrow School
- Alma mater: Balliol College, Oxford

Military service
- Allegiance: United Kingdom
- Branch/service: British Army
- Rank: Major
- Battles/wars: Second World War; North African Campaign; Italian Campaign; Battle of Monte Cassino

Richard Madron Seligman CBE (10 November 1918 – 9 July 2002) was a British Conservative Party politician. He spent most of his career in industry, where he came to understand and support the European Economic Community and was latterly a member of the European Parliament (MEP), winning the Sussex West seat in 1979 by a record margin of 95,484 votes, which earned him a place in the Guinness Book of Records. He held the seat until he retired in 1994.

== Background, early life and education ==
Seligman was born in Leatherhead, Surrey. His ancestors were German Jewish bankers who dispersed to Britain and the United States in the 19th century. His father, Richard, founded an industrial machinery business and his mother, Hilda, was a sculptor, author, activist, and philanthropist. He had an older sister, Audrey Babette Seligman (1907–1990), and three older brothers: Adrian (1909–2003), a Royal Navy Commander; Peter; and Oliver (who was killed in World War II).

Seligman was educated at Rokeby and at Harrow, where he played cricket for the school. He read Philosophy, Politics and Economics at Balliol College, Oxford and became President of the Union. He was an excellent sportsman, especially at cricket, rugby and tennis, and represented the university at skiing. He would later represent Britain in the sport at the 1952 Winter Olympics in Oslo.

== Wartime service ==
During World War II, Seligman served with the 6th Armoured Divisional Signals, rising to the rank of major. He fought in the North Africa and Italy campaigns, including at the Battle of Monte Cassino.

== Career ==
After the war, Seligman joined the industrial machinery business founded by his father. The A.P.V. Company, based in Crawley, produced a wide range of industrial equipment, mainly for food and drink processing. Seligman rose to be managing director.

Seligman became a member of the European Parliament (MEP), winning the Sussex West seat in 1979 by a record margin of 95,484 votes, which earned him a place in the Guinness Book of Records. He held the seat until he retired in 1994. He was appointed Order of the British Empire in 1994.

== Personal life ==
He married Nancy-Joan Marks, in 1947, and they had three sons and a daughter.

=== Friendship with Edward Heath ===
Seligman was well known as the oldest friend of the former prime minister Sir Edward Heath whom he met at Balliol College, Oxford, in 1937. Heath was godfather to his eldest son, Lincoln, and frequently holidayed with Seligman's family. In 1939, in the days before the outbreak of war, he was on a hiking holiday with Heath in Germany and Poland, an especially risky endeavour for Seligman, who was half Jewish. In Warsaw, they were warned by the British embassy to get out of Poland as fast as possible. They avoided being picked up by taking crowded trains and hitchhiking. While they were in Leipzig on 26 August, the news of the Molotov–Ribbentrop Pact was announced and they only just got to France before hostilities broke out.

European Parliament
Constituency created	Member of the European Parliament for Sussex West; 1979–1994	Constituency abolished
