= James E. Humphreys =

American mathematician (1939–2020)

James Edward Humphreys
- Born: December 10, 1939; Erie, Pennsylvania, U.S.
- Died: August 27, 2020 (aged 80); Leeds, Massachusetts, U.S.
- Education: Bachelor's degree from Oberlin College (1961), master's degree from Yale University (1964), PhD from Yale University (1966)
- Occupation: Mathematician
- Known for: Writing Introduction to Lie Algebras and Representation Theory; Receiving the Lester R. Ford Award in 1976

James Edward Humphreys (December 10, 1939 – August 27, 2020) was an American mathematician who worked in algebraic groups, Lie groups, and Lie algebras and applications of these mathematical structures. He is known as the author of several mathematical texts, such as Introduction to Lie Algebras and Representation Theory and Reflection Groups and Coxeter Groups.

After contracting COVID-19 weeks earlier during the COVID-19 pandemic in Massachusetts, Humphreys died on August 27, 2020, at the age of 80.

== Education ==
Humphreys attended elementary and secondary school in Erie, Pennsylvania and then studied at Oberlin College (bachelor's degree 1961) and from 1961 philosophy and mathematics at Cornell University. At Yale University he earned his master's degree in 1964 and his PhD in 1966 under George Seligman with thesis Algebraic Lie Algebras over fields of prime characteristic.

== Career ==
In 1966, he became an assistant professor at the University of Oregon and in 1970, an associate professor at New York University. At the University of Massachusetts Amherst he became in 1974 an associate professor and in 1976 a full professor; he retired there in 2003 as professor emeritus. In 1968/69 and in 1977, he was a visiting scholar at the Institute for Advanced Study and in 1969/70 at the Courant Institute of Mathematical Sciences of New York University. In 1985, he was a visiting professor at Rutgers University.

== Works ==
- Arithmetic Groups, Lecture Notes in Mathematics 789, Springer Verlag 1980 (from lectures at the Courant Institute 1971)
- Conjugacy classes in semisimple algebraic groups, AMS 1995
- Introduction to Lie Algebras and Representation Theory, Springer Verlag, Graduate Texts in Mathematics, 1972, 7th edition 1997 (also translated into Chinese and Russian)
- Linear Algebraic Groups, Graduate Texts in Mathematics, Springer Verlag 1974, 1998 (also translated into Russian). MR0396773
- Ordinary and modular representations of Chevalley groups, Springer Verlag 1976. MR0453884
- Modular representations of finite groups of Lie type, London Mathematical Society Lecture Note Series 326, Cambridge University Press 2006
- Reflection Groups and Coxeter Groups, Cambridge University Press 1990. MR1066460
- Representations of semisimple Lie algebras in the BGG category $\mathcal O$, AMS 2008
- Modular representations of simple Lie algebras, Bull. Amer. Math. Soc. (N.S.), Vol. 35, 1998, pp. 105–122. doi:10.1090/S0273-0979-98-00749-6
- Modular representations of classical Lie algebras, Bull. Amer. Math. Soc., Vol. 76, 1970, 878–882 doi:10.1090/S0002-9904-1970-12594-0
- Algebraic groups and modular Lie algebras, Memoirs AMS 71, 1967
- Hilbert's fourteenth problem, American Mathematical Monthly, Vol. 85, 1978, 341–353
- Representations of $\operatorname{SL}(2,p)$, Amer. Math. Monthly, Vol. 82, 1975, 21–39
- Highest weight modules for semisimple Lie algebras, in: Representation Theory I, Lecture Notes in Mathematics 831, Springer Verlag 1980, pp, 72–103 doi:10.1007/BFb0089779

== Awards ==
Humphreys received the Lester R. Ford Award for the publication Representations of $\operatorname{SL}(2,p)$ in 1976.
