= Esquire (UK Edition) =

British men's magazine

- Autumn 2025 cover featuring Leonardo DiCaprio
- Editor-in-Chief: Teo van den Broeke
- Categories: Men's
- Frequency: Quarterly
- Circulation: 59,979 (ABC Jul - Dec 2013); Print and digital editions.
- First issue: March 1991
- Company: Hearst Magazines UK (formerly National Magazine Company) a subsidiary of Hearst Magazines
- Country: United Kingdom
- Language: English
- Website: esquire.com/uk/

Esquire Magazine (UK edition) is a bi-monthly men's magazine originally owned by the National Magazine Company (since 2011, following a merger, renamed Hearst Magazines UK), a subsidiary of the US-based Hearst Corporation. The first edition was published Spring/Summer 1991.

The magazine features articles on luxe design and culture, food, business and technology, style, music and books. It is pitched at a similarly upscale audience to GQ, attempting to offer a more adult read than lad mags like Maxim and FHM.

Each issue, Esquire Magazine features famous celebrities on its cover: cover girls have included Katy Perry and Rachel Weisz; and male celebrities from Jeff Bridges and Jake Gyllenhaal to Dizzee Rascal have appeared on the cover. The first cover star was Brigitte Bardot.

Originally a monthly, the UK edition underwent a major revamp in 2019, dropping to six issues a year, but in a larger format, with an increased page count on higher quality paper. The July/August 2021 issue would be the last as a bi-monthly, before switching to a quarterly magazine.

In 2025, under the editorship of Teo van den Broeke, Esquire was given a successful rebrand, increasing frequency to six issues a year and introducing a new ethos, "For Better Men".

== Editors ==
The current editor is Teo van den Broeke

- 2011 – 2025: Alex Bilmes
- August 2007 – September 2010: Jeremy Langmead
- May 2003 – August 2007: Simon Tiffin
- March 1997 – March 2003: Peter Howarth
- February 1992 – January 1997: Rosie Boycott
- October 1990 – January 1992: Alex Finer
