= Power Without Responsibility =

1981 book by James Curran and Jean Seaton

- Author: James Curran and Jean Seaton
- Publisher: Routledge
- Publication date: 27 June 2018 (8th edition)
- Media type: Paperback
- Pages: 584
- ISBN: 0415710421
- OCLC: 1023819061
- Dewey Decimal: 302.2/34/0941
- LC Class: PN5114.C84 2018

Power Without Responsibility (subtitled: The Press and Broadcasting in Britain or Press, Broadcasting and the Internet in Britain) is a book written by James Curran (Professor of Communications at Goldsmiths College) and Jean Seaton (Professor of Media History at the University of Westminster). Originally published in 1981 by Fontana, it has been translated into several languages and is now in its eighth edition. The title comes from a quotation by the writer Rudyard Kipling; though it is widely attributed to Stanley Baldwin, the former Prime Minister of the United Kingdom, he was quoting Kipling. It details the history of the news media in the UK from the eighteenth century to the present.

In the introduction to Manufacturing Consent, Edward S. Herman and Noam Chomsky have cited this book; Chomsky has cited it again in a televised BBC interview with Andrew Marr. Nick Cohen rated it "the best guide to the British media" in a review for the New Statesman.

== Contents (Eighth edition) ==
Part I: Press history

- Whig press history as political mythology
- The struggle for a free press
- Janus face of reform
- Industrialization of the press
- Era of the press barons
- Press under public regulation
- Post-war press
- Press and the remaking of Britain
- Rise of the neo-liberal Establishment
- Moral decline of the press

Part II: Broadcasting history

- Reith and the denial of politics
- Broadcasting and the Blitz
- Public service commerce: ITV, new audience and new revenue
- Foreign affairs: The BBC, the world and the government
- Class, taste and profit
- Managers, regulators and broadcasters
- Public service under attack
- Broadcasting roller-coaster

Part III: Rise of new media

- New media in Britain
- History of the internet
- Sociology of the internet
- Social media: Making new societies or polarizing merchants?

Part IV: Theories of the media

- Metabolising Britishness
- Global understanding
- Broadcasting and the theory of public service

Part V: Politics of the media

- Industrial folklore and press reform
- Contradictions in media policy
- Media reform: Democratic choices
