= Ben Pimlott =

British historian (1945–2004)

Ben Pimlott FBA
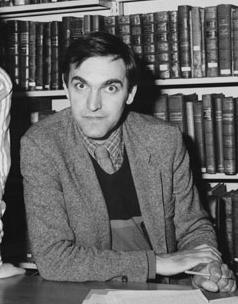
- Pimlott in 1984
- Born: Benjamin John Pimlott; 4 July 1945; Merton, Surrey, England
- Died: 10 April 2004 (aged 58); London, England
- Citizenship: United Kingdom; United States
- Education: Rokeby School; Marlborough College
- Alma mater: Worcester College, Oxford; Newcastle University
- Occupation: Historian
- Spouse: Jean Seaton (m. 1977)
- Children: 3

Benjamin John Pimlott FBA (4 July 1945 – 10 April 2004) was an historian of the post-war period in Britain. He made a substantial contribution to the literary genre of political biography. He has worked on political biographies about Hugh Dalton, Harold Wilson, and Queen Elizabeth II.

== Background ==
Ben Pimlott was born in Merton, Surrey, now Greater London, on 4 July 1945. His father was John Pimlott, a civil servant at the Home Office and former private secretary to Herbert Morrison. His mother, Ellen Dench Howes Pimlott, was American; her ancestors were Pilgrims, and she was a descendant of a victim of the Salem witch trials. Pimlott held dual citizenship. He grew up in Wimbledon and was educated at Rokeby School (which was then in Wimbledon), Marlborough College and Worcester College, Oxford, where he took a degree in Philosophy, Politics and Economics and a BPhil in politics, having originally won a scholarship to study there. In 1970, despite a pronounced stammer, he was appointed as a lecturer in the politics department of the University of Newcastle, where he also took his PhD.

In the February 1974 general election, Pimlott contested Arundel on behalf of the Labour Party, and Cleveland and Whitby the following October. Having lost on both occasions, he also contested the 1979 election, after which he left the North East to take up a research post at the London School of Economics, moving to a lectureship at Birkbeck College, London in 1981.

== Writing ==
During 1987–88, he was political editor of the New Statesman magazine and took on the post of Professor of Contemporary History at Birkbeck in 1988. For the following two years, Pimlott was responsible, with friends, for the short-lived journal Samizdat.

Aside from his attempts at a Parliamentary career in the 1970s, not to mention his tenure as Chairman of the Fabian Society in 1993/1994, Pimlott is best remembered for his works of political biography including the lives of Hugh Dalton (1985), Harold Wilson (1992), and a study of Queen Elizabeth II (1996). His study of Dalton won him the Whitbread Prize.

His other books include Labour and the Left in the 1930s (1977), The Trade Unions in British Politics (with Chris Cook, 1982), Fabian Essays in Socialist Thought (1984), The Alternative (with Tony Wright and Tony Flower, 1990), Frustrate their Knavish Tricks (1994) and Governing London (with Nirmala Rao, 2002).

== Views and legacy ==
Many of Pimlott's theses have stood the test of time, even if they were marginally controversial when originally published. His studies of the 1930s Labour left, the life of Harold Wilson and the constitutional effect of the monarchy in post-war Britain are said to have made his reputation as a biographer and even bestowed some additional credibility upon the subjects, all of which have received critical accounts under the pen of others. Pimlott was a critic of the concept of the post-war consensus in British politics, and believed that no such consensus actually existed.

In 1996, his works were recognised with a fellowship of the British Academy. In 1998, he became Warden of Goldsmiths, University of London.

== Personal life, death and legacy ==
In 1977, Pimlott married Jean Seaton, a lecturer on communications and the media at the University of Westminster. They had three children.

Pimlott died from complications of an intracerebral hemorrhage and acute myeloid leukaemia at the National Hospital for Neurology and Neurosurgery on 10 April 2004, at the age of 58. In 2005, Goldsmiths named a major new Will Alsop-designed building on its New Cross site in his honour, and the Fabian Society and The Guardian inaugurated the first annual Ben Pimlott Prize for Political Writing.

== Sources ==
- Julian Glover "Labour historian Pimlott dies at 58", The Guardian, 12 April 2004
- D. R. Thorpe Obituary: Professor Ben Pimlott, The Independent, 14 April 2004.

Party political offices
Preceded by Dianne Hayter	Chair of the Fabian Society; 1993 – 1994	Succeeded by Alf Dubs
