= Mary Sandbach =

British translator (1901–1990)

- Born: Mary Warburton Matthews; 25 April 1901; Edgbaston
- Died: 3 November 1990 (aged 89); Cambridge
- Occupation: Translator
- Spouse: Francis Henry Sandbach (m. 1932)

Mary Warburton Sandbach (born Mary Warburton Matthews; 25 April 1901 – 3 November 1990) was a British translator. She is noted for her translations of the Swedish writer August Strindberg.

== Life ==
Sandbach was born in Edgbaston in 1901. Her parents were Miriam (born Warburton) and Arthur Daniel Mathews. Her father was a foundry owner who went bankrupt. She experimented with attending Edgbaston High School for Girls but she preferred to be home educated by her mother. She was not considered academic, unlike her sister, who went to attend Newnham College, Cambridge. Mary had no formal educational qualifications.

In 1922 she began her interest in Scandinavia when she set out to be an au pair there. This was her second choice as her skill with the violin had failed to get her a place at the Royal School of Music. She was there for a year; in 1925 she returned, and spent four years in Sweden.

She returned to Birmingham where she studied speech therapy and she volunteered to assist in prisons. She married Francis Henry (Harry) Sandbach 1932; in the 1940s, they had a daughter and a son. By the outbreak of the Second World War she lived with Harry in Cambridge, where he was a professor of classics. They were both employed by the Admiralty and she worked in intelligence reading the Norwegian press. In 1940 she published her first book, drawing on her experience in Iceland which she had visited after the death of their first child in the 1930s.

Sandbach was given an early commission by the Swedish Institute to translate future Nobel Laureate Eyvind Johnson's novel 1914 into English. She translated the work and assisted with placing the book with a publisher. She became known for her translations from the Scandinavian languages of Danish, Swedish and Norwegian. She was noted for her translations of the works of August Strindberg. August Strindberg is known for his innovative style in Swedish and Sandbach, terse style in English is thought to be a good approach. Her Strindberg translations include Inferno, Getting Married and From an Occult Diary.

Sandbach died in 1990 in Cambridge.

== Translations ==
- 1914 by Eyvind Johnson (1970)
- Getting Married, Parts I and II, by August Strindberg, 1972
