= Adrian Seligman =

British sailor, writer and soldier (1909–2003)

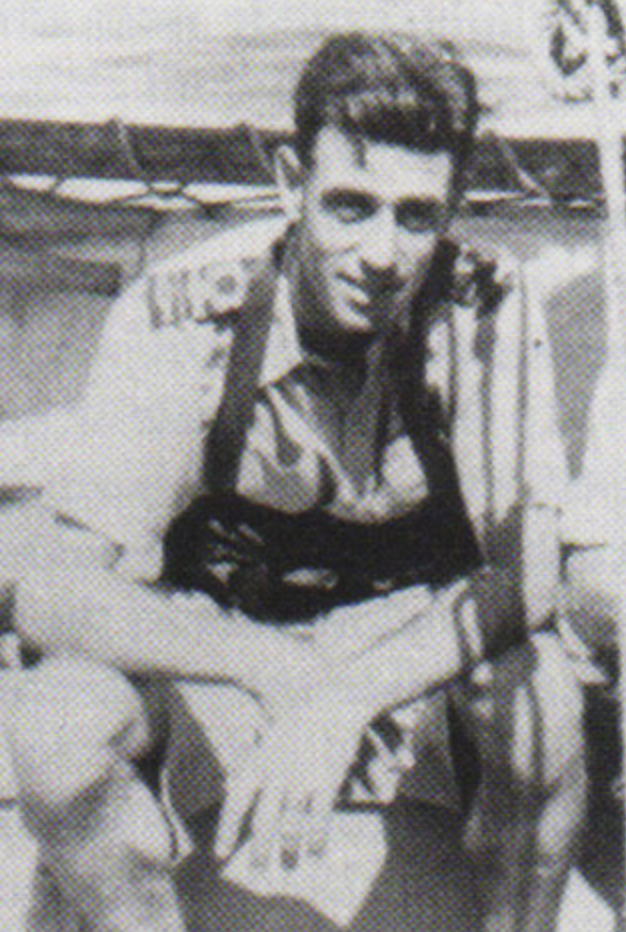
- Commander Adrian C. C. Seligman
- Born: 26 November 1909; Leatherhead, Surrey, England
- Died: 6 August 2003 (aged 93)
- Education: Rokeby Preparatory School, Harrow, University of Cambridge
- Occupations: Sailor, author and soldier
- Spouse(s): Jane Batterbury, later Rosemary Grimble
- Children: 6
- Relatives: Madron Seligman and Hilda Seligman (parents); Audrey Blackman (sister); Matthew Seligman (son)
- Writing career
- Genre: Children's literature
- Subject: Life at sea
- Notable work: Created the Levant Schooner Flotilla naval commando unit in the Aegian Sea

Adrian Charles Cuthbert Seligman, DSC (26 November 1909 – 6 August 2003) was a British sailor, writer, and soldier in the Second World War. Seligman would create the Levant Schooner Flotilla naval commando unit in the Aegean Sea.

== Early life ==
Seligman was born in Leatherhead, Surrey, England, to Jewish metallurgist Richard Seligman and author and sculptor Hilda Seligman (née McDowell). As a child, Seligman attended Rokeby Preparatory School in Kingston upon Thames, London, but learned to sail while his family vacationed in Saint-Jacut-de-la-Mer, Brittany. After failing natural science examinations at the University of Cambridge Seligman took work as a mess boy on a shipping freighter and began a career at sea. While working as a sailor, Seligman circumnavigated the globe three times aboard the ships Killoran and Olivebank.

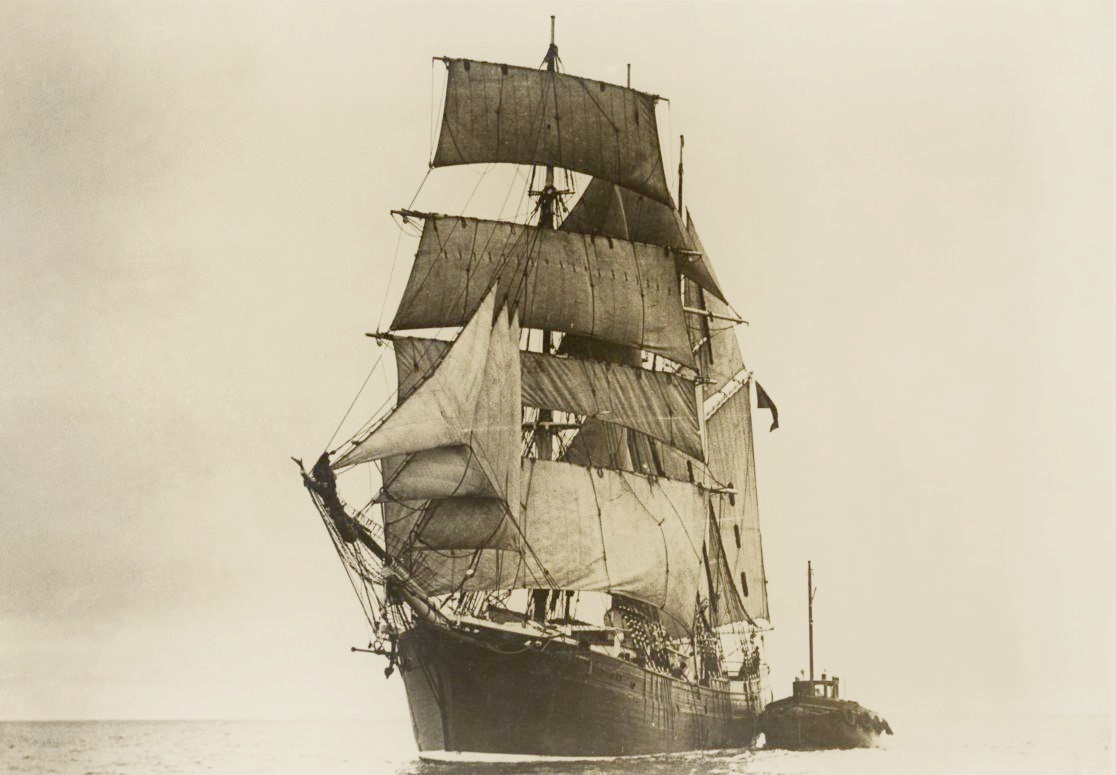
Barquentine Cap Pilar in 1939

Seligman purchased a 250-ton French fishing Barquentine named Cap Pilar on the advice of Joseph Stenhouse, a commander in the Royal Navy and former participant in Ernest Shackleton's Discovery Expedition. In 1936 Seligman, his wife Jane Batterbury, and a crew of six set out on a voyage to circumnavigate the globe. The project was funded in part by the London daily News Chronicle. The couple had a daughter, Jessica Jane, born in New Zealand during the voyage. In 1939, Seligman published a popular book about the experience, The Voyage of the Cap Pilar.

== Naval commando ==
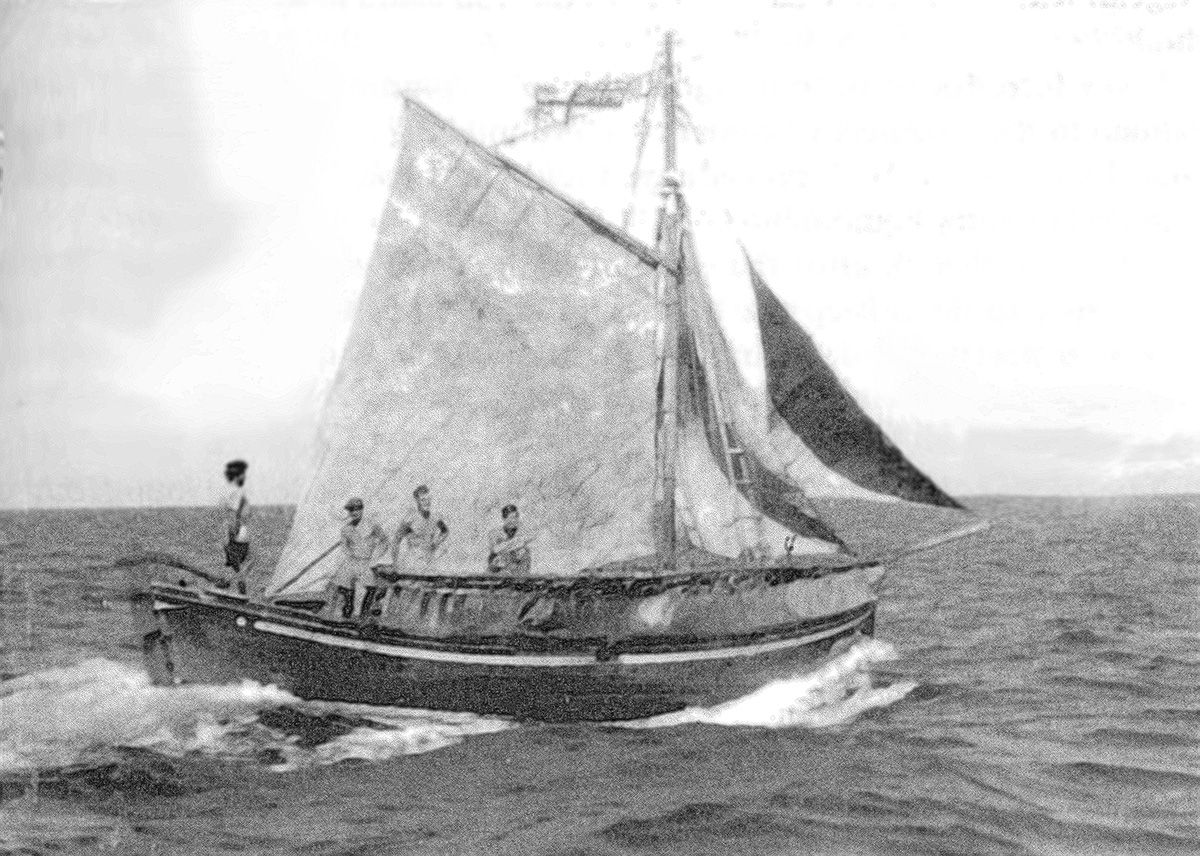
Caique of the Levant Schooner Flotilla, commanded by Seligman during World War II.

At the onset of WWII, Seligman was a sub-lieutenant in the Royal Naval Reserve. Initially, Seligman worked in minesweeping operations and commanded a destroyer. In 1941, Seligman and other reserve officers conducted a special operations mission to bring five ships from Russia to Syria through the German blockade at the Dardanelles. In this mission, Seligman commanded a camouflaged oiltanker called Olinda.

From 1942 to 1944, Seligman commanded the Levant Schooner Flotilla, a special operations group in the Aegean Sea. To accomplish this Seligman disguised Greek fishing caïques while outfitting them with military equipment. Caïques were operated by crews of 5–6 and were armed with 20mm cannons, Browning machine guns and Vickers aircraft machine guns. The vessels often operated under cover of darkness, landing or picking up commandos, rescuing partisans, and intercepting or raiding small German forces. Many ships were powered by Matilda tank engines and used long-range radios taken from Kittyhawk (P-40) fighter aircraft. Seligman was promoted to the rank of Commander at end of the war and awarded his DSC for bravery. His brother won the MC in the Army.

== Writing and later life ==
After WWII, Seligman lived in Malta and wrote children's books about life at sea. In 1947, he wrote a book about his wartime experiences, No Stars to Guide.

He remarried in 1950 to Rosemary Grimble, daughter of British diplomat Sir Arthur Grimble, with whom he had two sons—including bassist Matthew Seligman. In 1958, in London, Seligman founded a technical press agency.

After retirement, in 1994, he published another book on sailing, The Slope of the Wind; in 1996, he published a second account of the war, titled War in the Islands.
