= Daniel K. Nakano =

American mathematician

Daniel Ken Nakano (born July 30, 1964) is an American mathematician. Nakano is a Distinguished Research Professor of Mathematics at the University of Georgia; he specializes in representation theory.

Nakano was born in Seattle, Washington. His parents are Japanese American, and he grew up in Kirkland, Washington. Nakano graduated from the University of California, Berkeley in 1986, and earned a doctorate in mathematics from Yale University in 1990 under the supervision of George B. Seligman with thesis Projective Modules over Lie Algebras of Cartan Type. After temporary positions at Auburn University and Northwestern University, he became an assistant professor at Utah State University in 1994 and moved to the University of Georgia in 2001.

In 2010, Nakano was named Distinguished Research Professor. In 2012, he became one of the inaugural fellows of the American Mathematical Society.

In 2016, he received the Lamar Dodd Award Creative Research Award.

== Publications ==
- Lie Algebras, Lie Superalgebras, Vertex Algebras and Related Topics, American Mathematical Society, (2016)
