= James Marriott (author) =

English film critic, writer and editor (1972–2012)

- Born: James Patrick Blackden Marriott; 6 September 1972
- Died: 28 July 2012 (aged 39)
- Other name: Patrick Blackden (pen name)
- Education: University of Manchester, B.A., University of Exeter, M.A.
- Occupations: Film critic, writer and editor
- Employer(s): Random House, Simon & Schuster, Virgin Books, University of Bristol

James Patrick Blackden Marriott (6 September 1972 – 28 July 2012) was an English film critic and writer of fiction and non-fiction.

Marriott was educated at Rokeby Preparatory School and Wellington College, Berkshire. A graduate of the University of Manchester, he completed an MA in Film Studies at University of Exeter in 2010. His main interest was horror film, although his work included short stories and true crime fiction.

His book, Horror: the Definitive Guide to the Cinema of Fear (published by André Deutsch, 2006; ISBN 978-0-233-00201-9), and co-written with Kim Newman, was described by the London Review of Books, as "an extremely engaging and intelligent guide to horror film… informative, opinionated and down-right interesting to read." As a proof-reader and editor, he worked with Random House, Simon & Schuster and Virgin Books.

He began working as a library assistant at Bristol University's Arts and Social Sciences Library in October 2003. He advanced to hold Senior Library Assistant duties in the Continuing Education Library and in the library relegation team, and provided support in Special Collections.

== Death ==
Marriott died on 28 July 2012, aged 39, from undisclosed causes.

== Bibliography (non-fiction) ==
- My Bloody Valentine : Couples Whose Sick Crimes Shocked the World, Virgin Books, 2002; ISBN 978-0-7535-0647-9
- Danger Down Under, Virgin Books, 2002; ISBN 978-0-7535-0649-3
- Tourist Trap, Virgin Books, 2003; ISBN 0-7535-0845-1
- Holidaymakers from Hell: Shocking Behaviour by Tourists Abroad, Virgin Books, 2004; ISBN 978-0-7535-0863-3
- Horror Films, Virgin Books, 2007; ISBN 978-0-7535-1253-1 (under pen name "Patrick Blackden")
- Horror!: 333 Films to Scare You to Death, Carlton Books, 2010; ISBN 978-1-84732-520-4
