= Myth: Its Meaning and Functions =

1970 book by G.S. Kirk

Myth: Its Meaning and Functions in Ancient and Other Cultures
- 1970 and 1973 book cover
- Author: G.S. Kirk
- Subject: Mythology, Culture, Sociology
- Genre: Nonfiction
- Publisher: University of California Press
- Publication date: 1970
- Publication place: United Kingdom, United States
- Media type: Print, E-book
- Pages: 299
- ISBN: 9780520016514 9780520023895
- OCLC: 91965
- LC Class: BL311 .K55 1970
- Website: Official website

Myth: Its Meaning and Functions in Ancient and Other Cultures is a study of the nature of myths written by G. S. Kirk and originally published by the University of California Press in 1970. This book connects varied but associated problems that occur when determining the nature of myths. For example, discussions include distinguishing between folktales, rituals, and myths; application of structuralist theory; the functions of myths; the influence of social institutions and literacy on myths; special cultural characteristics of various myths; and a variety of other lenses through which myths are viewed and discussed.

== Synopsis ==
Kirk evaluates theories about the origins and importance of myths. Included in these discussions, and worthy of note, are what he sees as the flaws of the Cambridge School and the structuralism of Claude Levi-Strauss. He also includes critiques of past scholarship, demonstrating in his eyes, their deficiencies. Also, he provides a historical overview of myth studies that defines important terms and describes the relationship between religion and ritual. Kirk says that although religion and ritual are often linked, they may not always be directly connected.

Furthermore, he separates myths and folktales, noting that they demonstrate different structures for telling their stories. Kirk argues that the study of mythology primarily focuses on narrative forms. As such he does not share the views of other scholars who promote myths as mostly ritualistic interpretations. Additionally, Kirk rejects universal explanations for the creation, evolution, and meaning of myths. Instead, he emphasizes the uniqueness of each narrative, along with the diversity found in the cosmology of mythological narratives, often requiring a nuanced approach for comprehension.
