= Selig (name) =

Selig (Yiddish: סעליג) is a Yiddish- and German-language masculine given name and surname, meaning "blessed." It is a variant of the Yiddish given name Zelig. It may refer to:

== Surname ==
- Bud Selig (born 1934), American baseball administrator
- Edith Selig (born 1960), French singer
- Josh Selig (born 1964), American television producer
- Martin Selig (born 1936), American businessman
- Phineas Selig (1856–1941), New Zealand journalist
- Rüdiger Selig (born 1989), German cyclist
- Stefan M. Selig (born 1963), American banker
- Wendy Selig-Prieb (born 1960), American businesswoman, president of the Milwaukee Brewers organisation and daughter of Bud Selig
- William Selig (1864–1948), American film producer
- Zachary Selig (1949–2016), American artist

== Given name ==
- Selig Brodetsky (1888–1954), British mathematician, President of the Hebrew University of Jerusalem
- Selig S. Harrison (1927–2016), American writer
- Selig Hecht (1892–1947), American physiologist
- Selig Mogulesko (1858–1914), American comedian
- Selig Perlman (1888–1959), American historian
- Selig Schachnowitz (1874–1952), Swiss-Jewish writer
- Selig J. Seligman (1918-1969), American lawyer and film executive

== See also ==
- Selig (disambiguation)
- Zelig (disambiguation)
- Seligman (disambiguation)
