= Cannizaro Park =

Park in London

Coordinates: 51°25′27″N 0°13′51″W

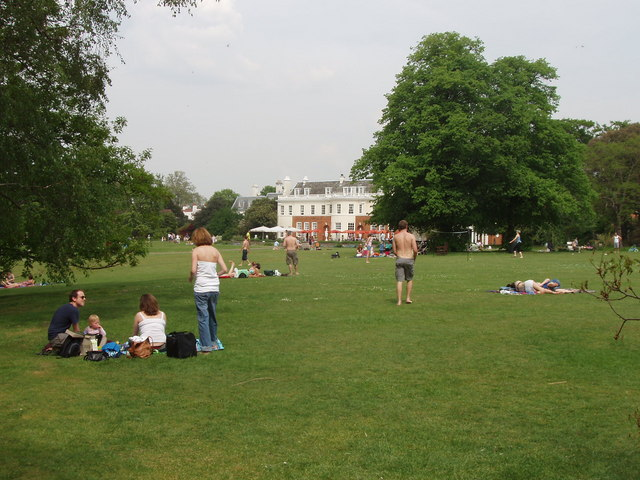
The House across the park lawn

Cannizaro Park is a public park in Wimbledon in the London Borough of Merton. Located towards the south-western edge of Wimbledon Common, it is known for its ornamental landscaped gardens with ponds and sculpture.

The park is Grade II* listed on the Register of Historic Parks and Gardens.

== History ==
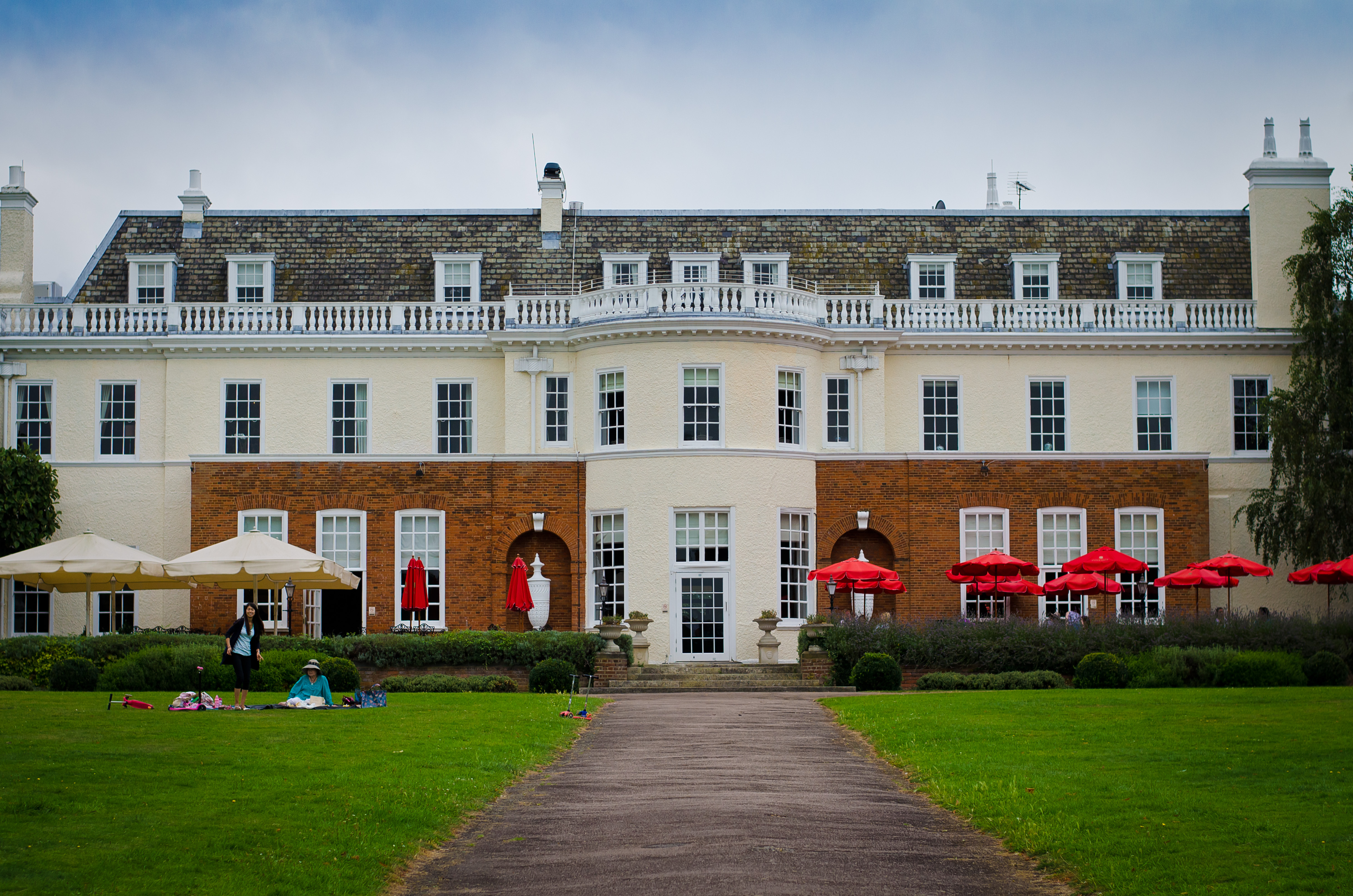
Cannizaro House (before recent building)

The park is the remnant of the gardens of the former country house at its centre (now a hotel). The house, originally known as Warren House, was built in the 18th century and was owned by the Grosvenor and Drax families who, for most of its history, let it to a series of wealthy tenants. The adjacent Royal Wimbledon golf course and the western parts of Wimbledon village were also once parts of the estate.

Between 1785 and 1806, Home Secretary and Secretary of State for War, Henry Dundas, 1st Viscount Melville, occupied the house. At this time it was a major social centre for royalty and senior politicians (George III, Prime Minister William Pitt the Younger and William Wilberforce all stayed there regularly). Dundas organised the landscaping of the gardens, the basic structure of which remains today. Lady Jane Wood in the gardens is a memorial to his wife.

After the Dundas family moved out, George Johnstone and his sister Sophia moved in. Their father, also called George, was a Governor of West Florida and a director of the East India Company.

After George died in 1813, Sophia married the Sicilian Francis Platamone, Count St. Antonio. In 1817 they leased Warren House and held regular parties and concerts, whose attendees included Prime Minister the Duke of Wellington and Mrs Fitzherbert, mistress of King George IV. The Count left his wife and returned to Italy in 1832 when he inherited the title Duke of Cannizzaro. The Duchess remained at Warren House until she died in 1841. After her death, the house came to be known by her husband's title (with a variation in the spelling).

A major fire at the beginning of the 20th century destroyed much of the house but it was rebuilt and extended to its current arrangement. In the 1920s Cannizaro House was owned by Admiral Plunkett-Ernle-Erle-Drax. He sold it to the Wilson family, its last private owners.

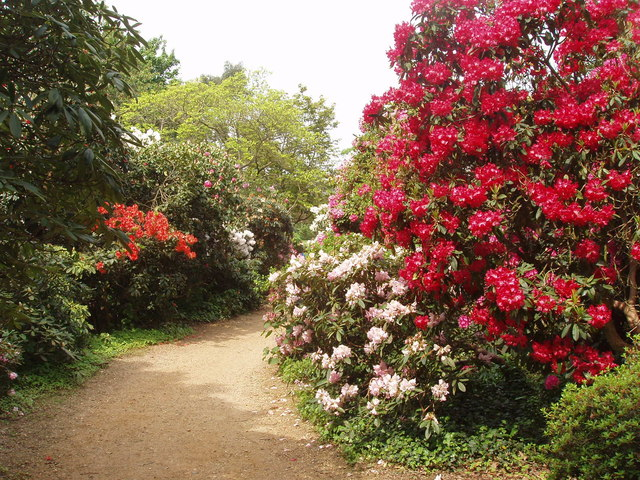
Rhododendron dell in Cannizaro Park

The Wilsons owned the house until the late 1940s and made a series of improvements in the gardens with the planting of new trees, rhododendrons, azaleas and camellias. In 1947, the house and gardens were sold to Wimbledon Borough Council. The gardens were opened to the public shortly afterwards and the house was for a time used as a nursing home.

The London Borough of Merton sold the house in the 1980s and it was subsequently converted to its current use as a hotel. The surrounding gardens remain in council ownership and are open to the public. Most parts are well maintained, keeping the character of a large private garden, with many distinct areas and small "garden rooms", but the elaborate Italian Gardens are largely unplanted. For a number of years the Italian Gardens saw opera performances in the summer as part of the Cannizaro Festival, but in 2013 the festival was not held.

== Bust of Haile Selassie ==
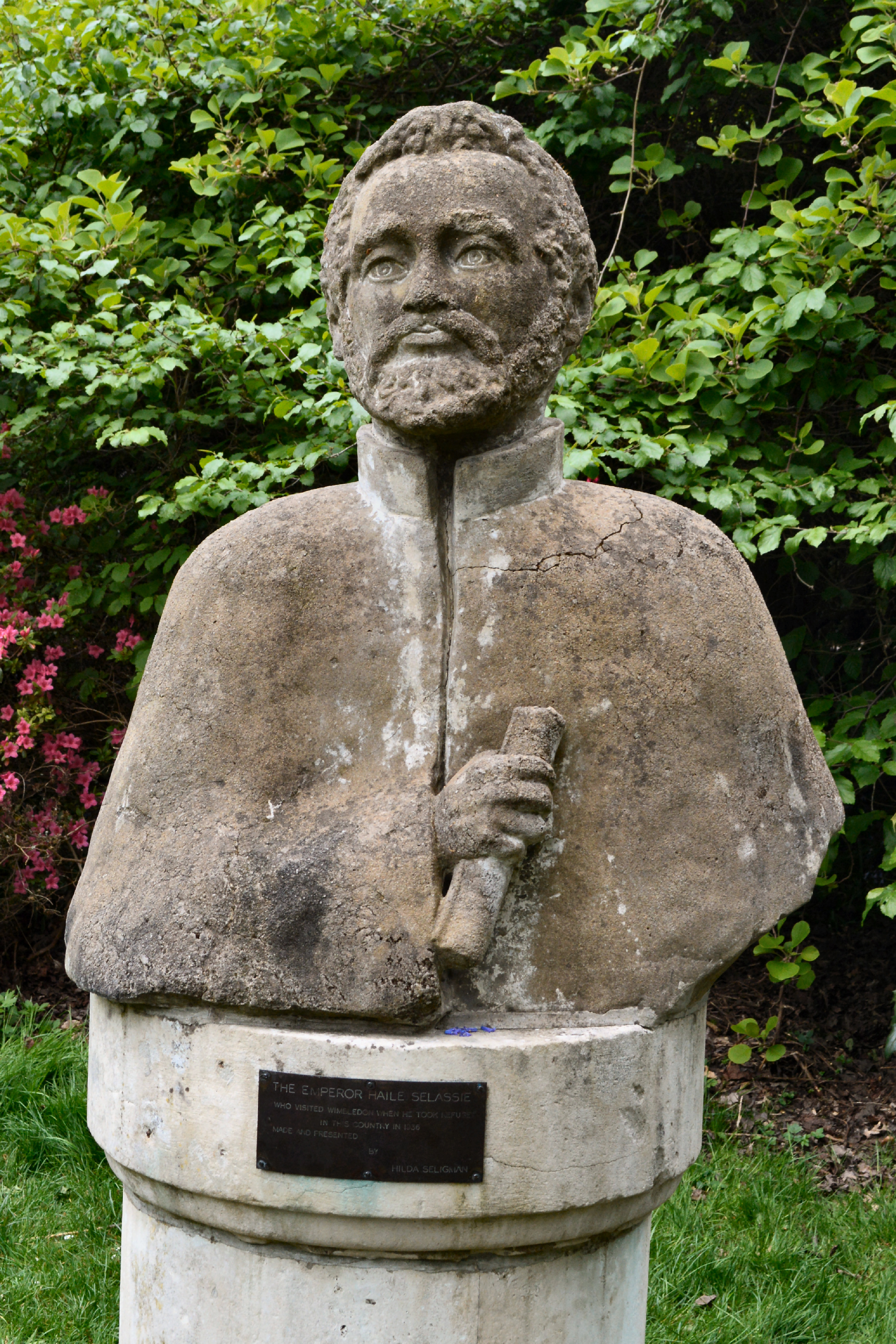
Bust of Ethiopian Emperor Haile Selassie

Cannizaro Park was the home to a bust of Ethiopian Emperor Haile Selassie, created by Hilda Seligman. Selassie stayed in Wimbledon during his exile from Ethiopia in 1936, staying at Seligman's nearby family home. The statue was installed in Cannizaro Park after Seligman's home, Lincoln House, was demolished in 1957.

The bust was destroyed in June 2020 by a crowd of around 100 protestors, thought to have been linked to unrest in Ethiopia following the shooting of Hachalu Hundessa the previous day.
