= Harry Sandbach =

British classical scholar (1903–1991)

Harry Sandbach FBA
- Photographed in old age
- Born: Francis Henry Sandbach; 23 February 1903; Edgbaston, Birmingham, England
- Died: 18 September 1991 (aged 88)
- Education: King Edward's School, Birmingham; Trinity College, Cambridge
- Occupation: Classical scholar
- Known for: Professor of Classics at the University of Cambridge; Fellow and Senior Tutor of Trinity College
- Notable work: Translations of books VII, IX, XI, and XV of Plutarch's Moralia
- Spouse: Mary Warburton Matthews (m. 1932; died 1990)

Francis Henry Sandbach FBA (23 February 1903 – 18 September 1991), generally known as Harry Sandbach, was a British academic, who held the position of the Professor of Classics at the University of Cambridge, and a Fellow and Senior Tutor of Trinity College.

== Early years ==
Francis Henry Sandbach was born in Edgbaston, the elder son of Professor Francis Edward Sandbach, then a lecturer in German at the University of Birmingham, and his wife Ethel Bywater, a teacher.

He was educated at King Edward's School, Birmingham, where he became school captain, and attended Trinity College, Cambridge, where he held the Browne and Craven scholarships in 1923, and was awarded the Chancellor's Medal and the Charles Oldham Classical Scholarship in 1925.

== Career ==
After graduating, he was appointed to an assistant lectureship at the University of Manchester from 1926 to 1929. In 1927 he was awarded a fellowship at Trinity College, Cambridge, and in 1929 left Manchester to take up a lectureship at the college. In 1951 he was appointed as the Brereton Reader in Classics, and in 1967 given a professorship, which he held until his retirement in 1970. In 1968, he was made a Fellow of the British Academy. Within Trinity, he was a tutor from 1945 to 1952 and senior tutor from 1952 to 1956; in 1940–41 he held the university position of Junior Proctor.

During the Second World War, Sandbach served as an air raid warden between 1939 and 1943. He was seconded to the Admiralty in 1943–45, where he worked in the Economic Section of the Topographic Department.

Sandbach produced translations of books VII, IX, XI, and XV of Plutarch's Moralia, published by the Loeb Classical Library, as well as material by Menander. In retirement, he published works on Menander, the Stoics, and Greco-Roman theatre.

== Private life ==
On 9 July 1932 he married the translator Mary Warburton, whom he had known since childhood. Their first child died soon after birth, but they later had a son and a daughter. Mary died in 1990.
