= Zelikovitch =

Zelikovitch (Hebrew: זליקוביץ׳, Yiddish: זעליקאָוויטש, Polish: Zelikowicz, Zielikowicz, Romanian: Zelicovici, Ukrainian: Зеликович, romanized: Zelikovych), also spelled Zelikovich, Zelikovitz, or Zelikowitz, is an Ashkenazi Jewish surname. It is derived from the Yiddish-language personal name Zelig. The Slavic suffix "-ovich" means "son of".

Notable people with the surname include:

- Antonina Makhina-Dumcheva-Zelikovich (born 1964), Russian rower
- Elimelekh Zelikovich, commander of the first instructors' course of the Hagana underground in the 1920s
- Getzel Zelikovitch, Egyptologist, writer, journalist and translator
- Joe Zelikovitz (1914–1988), Canadian football player
- Miriam Eshkol (née Zelikovich), wife of Israeli Prime Minister Levi Eshkol
- Reuven Zelicovici (later Rubin), Romanian-born Israeli painter and Israel's first ambassador to Romania
- Yuriy Zelikovich, Soviet rower

== See also ==
- Zeljković
- Ashkenazi Jews
- Jewish surnames
