= George Seligman =

American mathematician (1927–2024)

George B. Seligman
- Born: April 30, 1927; Attica, New York, U.S.
- Died: April 25, 2024 (aged 96); Hamden, Connecticut, U.S.
- Education: University of Rochester; Yale University
- Scientific career
- Fields: Mathematics
- Workplaces: Princeton University; Yale University
- Thesis: Lie algebras of prime characteristic (1954)
- Doctoral advisor: Nathan Jacobson
- Doctoral students: James E. Humphreys; Brian J Parshall; Daniel K. Nakano

George Benham Seligman (April 30, 1927 – April 25, 2024) was an American mathematician who worked on Lie algebras, especially semi-simple Lie algebras.

== Biography ==
Seligman was born on April 30, 1927. He received his bachelor's degree in 1950 from the University of Rochester and his PhD in 1954 from Yale University under Nathan Jacobson with thesis Lie algebras of prime characteristic. After he received his PhD he was a Henry Burchard Fine Instructor at Princeton University from 1954–1956. In 1956 he became an instructor and from 1965 a full professor at Yale, where he was chair of the mathematics department from 1974 to 1977.

For the academic year 1958/59 he was a Fulbright Lecturer at the University of Münster. His doctoral students include James E. Humphreys, Brian J Parshall, and Daniel K. Nakano.

Seligman married Irene Schwieder in 1959. The couple had two daughters. He died in Hamden, Connecticut, on April 25, 2024, at the age of 96.

== Selected works ==
=== Books ===
- On Lie algebras of prime characteristic, American Mathematical Society, 1956
- Liesche Algebren, Schriftenreihe des Mathematischen Instituts der Universität Münster, 1959
- Modular Lie Algebras, Springer Verlag 1967
- Rational methods in Lie algebras, Marcel Dekker 1976
- Rational constructions of modules for simple Lie algebras, American Mathematical Society 1981
- Construction of Lie Algebras and their Modules, Springer Verlag 1988

=== Articles ===
- Seligman, G. B. (1954). "On a class of semisimple restricted Lie algebras". Proceedings of the National Academy of Sciences of the United States of America. 40 (8): 726–728. Bibcode:1954PNAS...40..726S. doi:10.1073/pnas.40.8.726. PMC 534151. PMID 16589548.
- Seligman, George B. (1957). "Characteristic ideals and the structure of Lie algebras". Proceedings of the American Mathematical Society. 8: 159–164. doi:10.1090/s0002-9939-1957-0082974-9. MR 0082974.
- Seligman, George B. (1959). "On automorphisms of Lie algebras of classical type". Transactions of the American Mathematical Society. 92 (3): 430–448. doi:10.1090/s0002-9947-1959-0106965-0. MR 0106965.
- Seligman, George B. (1960). "On automorphisms of Lie algebras of classical type. II". Trans. Amer. Math. Soc. 94 (3): 452–482. doi:10.1090/s0002-9947-1960-0113969-9. MR 0113969.
- Seligman, George B. (1960). "On automorphisms of Lie algebras of classical type. III". Trans. Amer. Math. Soc. 97 (2): 286–312. doi:10.1090/s0002-9947-1960-0123644-2. MR 0123644.
- Seligman, George B. (1967). "Some results on Lie p-algebras". Bulletin of the American Mathematical Society. 73 (4): 528–530. doi:10.1090/s0002-9904-1967-11731-2. MR 0219585.
- "Algebraic Lie groups". Bull. Amer. Math. Soc. 74: 1051–1065. 1968. doi:10.1090/s0002-9904-1968-12046-4. MR 0232810.
- Seligman, George B. (2003). "On idempotents in reduced enveloping algebras". Trans. Amer. Math. Soc. 355 (8): 3291–3300. doi:10.1090/s0002-9947-03-03314-2. MR 1974688.
