= Hilda Seligman =

British sculptor, author and campaigner

Hilda Mary Seligman (née McDowell; 18 January 1882 – 20 December 1964) was a British sculptor, author and campaigner.

Hilda McDowell was born in Blackburn, Lancashire in 1882. She married the metallurgist and chemical engineer Richard Seligman (1878–1972) in London in 1906. They had four sons: Adrian (1909–2003), Peter, Oliver (who was killed in WWII), and Madron (1918–2002); and a daughter: Audrey Babette Seligman (1907–1990).

During the inter-war period, Seligman entertained Mahatma Gandhi and the Emperor Haile Selassie at her home in Wimbledon, London. She spent some time in India and founded the 'Skippo' Fund in London in 1945. The fund was set up with royalties from her book Skippo of Nonesuch (1943) about a goat named 'Skippo', and donations and gifts from Emmeline Pethick-Lawrence and Isobel Cripps. The Fund paid for a mobile health van that was custom built in the UK, and later other health vans to serve isolated villages in India and Pakistan. The Fund's 'Asoka-Akbar Mobile Health Vans' were given to the All India Women's Conference to administer.

Seligman also wrote two other small books: When Peacocks Called (1940), Asoka, Emperor of India (1947). Rabindranath Tagore wrote the foreword to When Peacocks Called.

In 1999, Seligman's papers (Ref: 7HSE) were presented as a gift to the Women's Library, London School of Economics, where they are still held.

== Sculptures ==
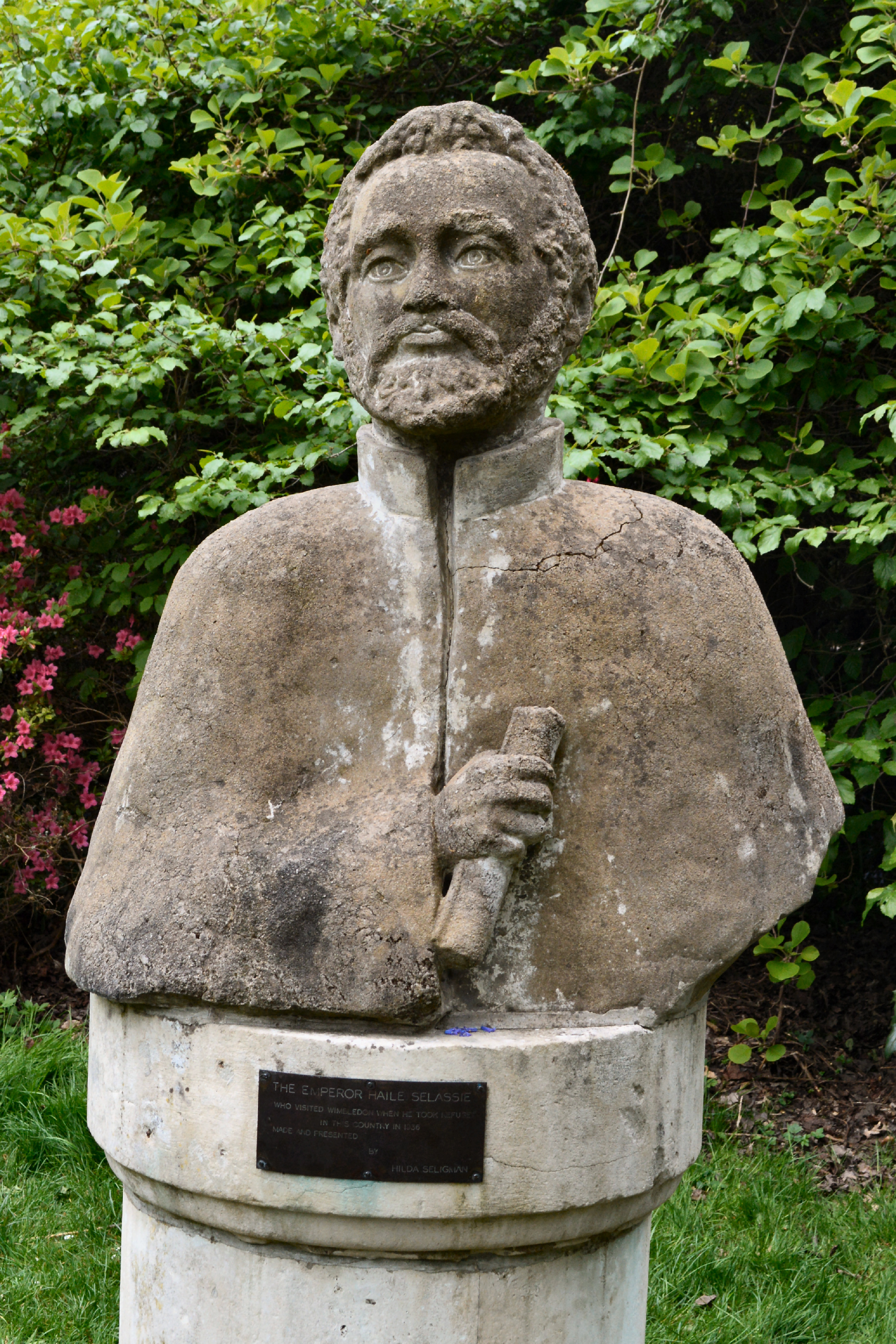
Bust of Emperor Haile Selassie of Ethiopia, in Cannizaro Park, Wimbledon, destroyed by demonstrators in 2020.

Seligman created a bust of Haile Selassie from life in 1936 during his exile from Ethiopia, when he stayed at Selgman's family home, Lincoln House. The bust originally stood in the grounds of the house, and remained there until the building was demolished in 1957. The bust was later installed in Cannizaro Park, where it stood until 30 June 2020, when it was toppled and smashed to pieces by protestors.

Her bronze sculpture, 'J. P. Blake, Esq.' was displayed at the Royal Glasgow Institute of the Fine Arts Eighty-Second Annual Exhibition, 1943, and at the Royal Academy.

Seligman made and donated a 75-centimetre (30 in) bust of Chandragupta Maurya, founder of the Maurya Empire who reigned from 321 B.C. to 296 B.C., for installation in The Indian Parliament complex. It today stands in the courtyard opposite Gate No. 5 of Parliament House, on a red sandstone pedestal, bearing the inscription "Shepherd boy Chandragupta Maurya, dreaming of the India he was to create".
