= Zelig (disambiguation) =

Zelig is a 1983 Woody Allen film.

Zelig may also refer to:

- Zelig (name)
- Zelig Records

== See also ==
- Selig (disambiguation)
- Zellij tiles
