= Audrey Blackman =

British artist (1907–1990)

- Born: Audrey Seligman; 28 July 1907; London, England
- Died: 1990 (aged 82–83); Abingdon, Oxfordshire
- Education: Kunstgewerbeschule, Graz; Goldsmiths' College; University of Reading
- Known for: Sculpture, pottery

Audrey Babette Blackman (née Seligman; 28 July 1907 – 17 July 1990) was a British sculptor and ceramist.

== Biography ==
Blackman was born in London and raised in Leatherhead in Surrey by her parents, Hilda, a sculptor and author, and Richard Seligman, a chemical engineer. After attending Wimbledon High School in London, Blackman spent two years, from 1924, at a Kunstgewerbeschule in Graz in Austria before returning to England to study at Goldsmiths College School of Art until 1930 and then at the University of Reading from 1931 until 1935.

Blackman initially worked in bronze to produce small group pieces and figures but after World War II began using terracotta and stoneware before concentrating on creating ceramic figures. In her ceramic work, Blackman worked rolled and slabbed pieces of clay into figurines and, in 1978, published a handbook, Rolled Pottery Figures, on her technique. Later in her life she produced more abstract pieces, including paintings in both watercolour and gouache.

Blackman was a regular exhibitor with the Society of Women Artists, SWA, and at the Royal Academy in London. She showed some 48 works with the SWA between 1939 and 1971 and was elected an associate member in 1952 and a full member in 1961. Seventeen works by Blackman were included in Royal Academy exhibitions between 1938 and 1960. She also exhibited on at least one occasion at the Royal Glasgow Institute of the Fine Arts and was a member of the Art Workers Guild. Blackman was active in several bodies promoting arts and crafts including the International Academy of Ceramics, the Craft Advisory Committee and the Federation of British Craft Societies.

Living in Boar's Hill near Oxford, she married Geoffrey Blackman, the Sibthorpian professor of rural economy at Oxford University, and she was long associated with that University's St Cross College, where several examples of her sculpture and pottery are held and a room is named in her memory.
