= The Black Curriculum =

British community interest company

The Black Curriculum is a British community interest company, founded in 2019, whose mission is "to address the lack of Black British history in the UK curriculum".

== History ==
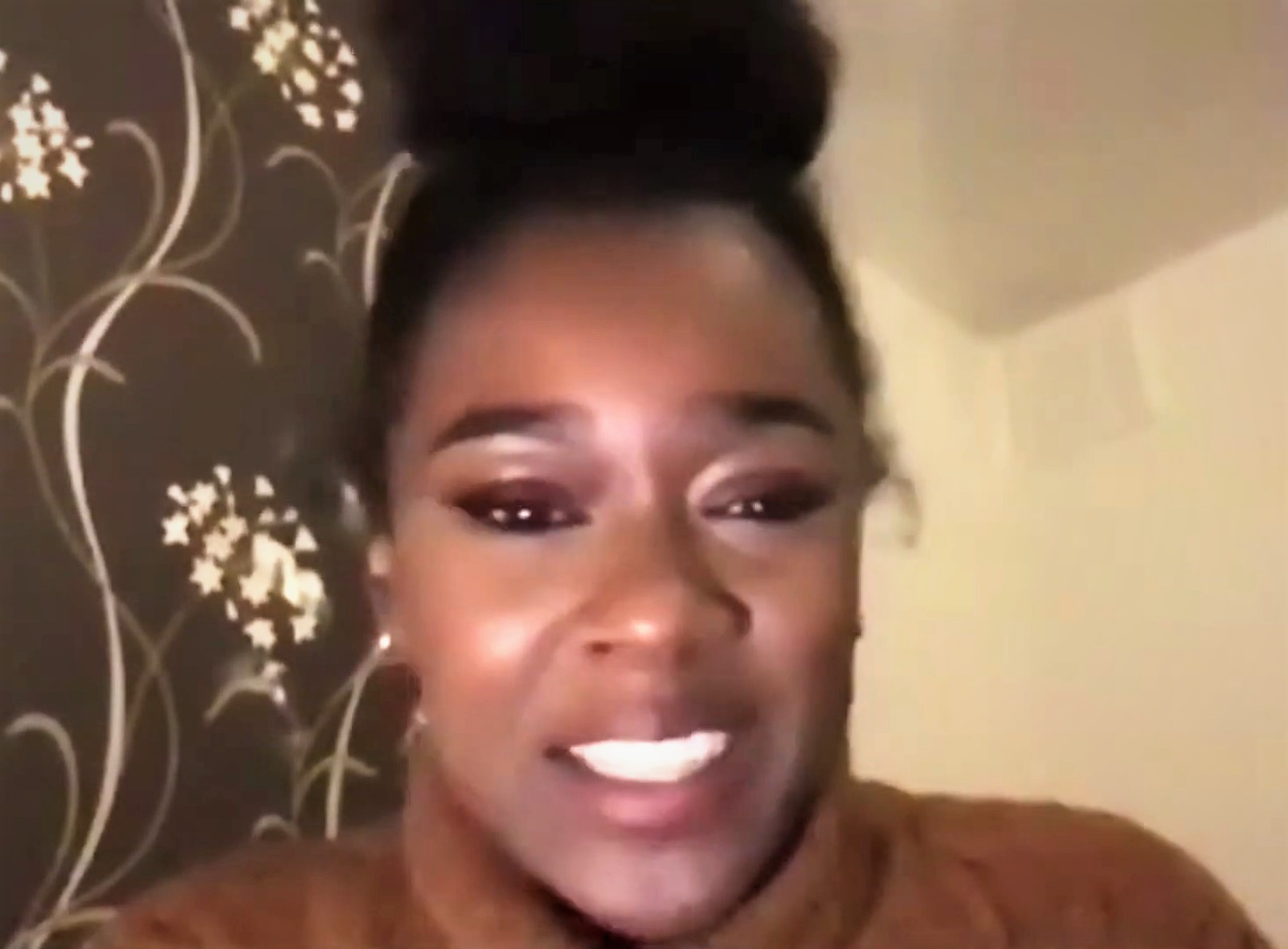
Lavinya Stennett in 2020

The organisation was established in 2019 by Lavinya Stennett, who conceived the idea while studying for a degree in African Studies and Development Studies at SOAS University of London and reflecting on her own education in south London, where Black History Month covered slavery, Martin Luther King Jr. and the American civil rights movement but had taught her little about Black British history.

The Black Curriculum first patron was Virgil Abloh, the late American fashion designer and entrepreneur, who offered financial support to The Black Curriculum through his "Post-Modern" Scholarship Fund. Abloh, together with Edward Enninful, created a collection to benefit The Black Curriculum before his early death, with the aim of furthering the company's mission to educate people on Black British History across the UK.

Gábor Szabó-Zsoldos's study examines decolonization in the context of history teaching in the UK, focusing on The Black Curriculum and other movements. The study analyses their criticism of the educational system from an anti-colonial standpoint, their aspirations concerning curricula, and the methods they adopt. The Black Curriculum is highlighted for its mission to address the omission of Black British history in the UK National Curriculum. The study provides insights into the motives and goals of these decolonizing approaches, reviewing source materials, including reports, movements' publications, and official documents. The Black Curriculum (TBC) has been advocating for changes in how Black British history is taught in schools. Their approach includes incorporating arts, using music, literature, and visual arts to convey Black British history, encouraging critical thinking, and discussion on topics like inequality and legacy. TBC seeks a more inclusive and nuanced approach to teaching Black British history by challenging Eurocentric perspectives, highlighting diverse contributions, and using creative and technology-driven methods to engage students.

The Black Curriculum supports projects such as the podcast called A Letter Home. The podcast focuses on effectively combining celebration and reflection, with the goal of amplifying the voices and experiences of the Black Caribbean community in the UK through topics including the "Windrush generation".

=== Report ===
In 2020, the group produced a report, written by Jason Arday, on the lack of black history in the current UK National Curriculum (for England, Northern Ireland, Scotland and Wales). The report "explores how the current History National Curriculum systematically omits the contribution of Black British history in favour of a dominant White, Eurocentric curriculum that fails to reflect our multi-ethnic and broadly diverse society".

=== Government snub ===
They hoped to discuss the report with the Secretary of State for Education but their request for a meeting was rejected, the government stating that the existing curriculum was "broad, balanced and flexible, allowing schools to teach Black history".

== Black Lives Matter ==
The Black Curriculum was one of the two causes (the other being Bristol-based Cargo Classroom) chosen by Jen Reid to receive any profits if the statue of her by Marc Quinn, erected in Bristol in July 2020 on the plinth of the toppled statue of Edward Colston in Bristol, was ever sold.
