= Edward Colston (disambiguation) =

Edward Colston (1636–1721) was an English merchant, slave trader, philanthropist and Member of Parliament.

Edward Colston may also refer to:

- Edward Colston (MP for Wells) (died 1719), English Member of Parliament
- Edward Colston (U.S. Representative) (1786–1852), U.S. Representative from Virginia
- Edward Francis Colston (1795–1847), English landowner, owner of Roundway Park, Wiltshire
- Edward Murray Colston, 2nd Baron Roundway (1880–1944), British Army officer
