= A Surge of Power (Jen Reid) 2020 =

Statue in Bristol, UK

Coordinates: 51.4540°N 2.5972°W

- The statue as placed on 15 July 2020
- Artist: Marc Quinn and Jen Reid
- Completion date: 2020
- Type: Sculpture
- Medium: Resin and steel
- Subject: Jen Reid
- Condition: Figure removed
- Location: Bristol, England

A Surge of Power (Jen Reid) 2020 is a 2020 black resin sculpture, sculpted by Marc Quinn and modelled on Jen Reid; both Quinn and Reid are credited as artists. It depicts Reid, a black female protester, raising her arm in a Black Power salute. It was erected surreptitiously in the city centre of Bristol, England, in the early morning of 15 July 2020. It was placed on the empty plinth from which a 19th-century statue of Edward Colston, who had been involved in the Atlantic slave trade, had been toppled, defaced and pushed into the city's harbour by George Floyd protesters the previous month. The statue was removed by Bristol City Council the day after it was installed.

== Background ==
On 7 June 2020 the statue of Edward Colston, a prominent 17th- and 18th-century Bristol merchant, philanthropist and Member of Parliament who had been involved in the Atlantic slave trade, was toppled during George Floyd protests in the United Kingdom. It had stood on a 10 ft 6 in (3.20 m) Portland stone plinth. The statue had become a focal point of protests against the part Bristol played in the slave trade.

Following the toppling of the statue, Black Lives Matter protester Jen Reid, a woman of Jamaican descent, climbed onto the plinth and made a raised fist. A photograph of this was taken by Reid's husband and posted to Instagram where it was seen by Quinn. Reid said: "Seeing the statue of Edward Colston being thrown into the river felt like a truly historical moment; huge. When I was stood there on the plinth, and raised my arm in a Black Power salute, it was totally spontaneous, I didn't even think about it. My immediate thoughts were for the enslaved people who died at the hands of Colston and to give them power. I wanted to give George Floyd power, I wanted to give power to Black people like me who have suffered injustices and inequality."

== Description and creation ==
The statue A Surge of Power (Jen Reid) 2020 was constructed by the artist Marc Quinn and his team from black resin and steel. It is a life-size depiction of Reid, a 49-year old black woman, making the same raised fist pose she struck on the plinth shortly after the Colston statue's removal. She is depicted wearing a casual jacket over a dress or skirt, and the black beret and glove which she had bought specifically for the march. Her left hand hangs by her side, and she has voluminous curly hair. She stands on a shallow square plinth and the entire work measures 7.5 ft (2.3 m) in height. Quinn and Reid describe the work as a collaboration between them, with Quinn stating that "Jen created the sculpture when she stood on the plinth and raised her arm in the air ... Now we're crystallising it."

To create the sculpture, Quinn made a 3D scan of Reid recreating the pose. The sculpture was 3D printed in sections before being cast in black resin and steel and assembled. To make the statue in bronze would have added several additional months to the project.

Reid and Quinn have designated the work as not-for-profit, stating that, if the sculpture ends up being sold, profits would be donated to Cargo Classroom and The Black Curriculum, two educational charities chosen by Reid.

== Erection ==
Location in Bristol of plinth where statue was erected

The statue was erected secretly, by a team of 10 people in 15 minutes at around 5am on 15 July 2020. It was set on the 10 ft 6 in (3.20 m) Portland stone plinth on which the statue of Edward Colston had stood in The Centre, Bristol. The installation of the statue was not illegal, with police stating that no offence had been committed and that the statue was a matter for the council. The statue was affixed without drilling or gluing in order to minimise the possibility of damage to the plinth.

In a statement issued on the day of the statue's erection, Quinn stated that no formal permission has been sought for its erection. The Mayor of Bristol Marvin Rees later said that some weeks earlier Quinn had asked him about placing a statue on the plinth, but that he had refused believing it to be "not the correct next step for the city" and to have the potential to incite race-hate incidents.

== Quinn's rationale ==
Quinn described the piece as a "new temporary, public installation", "ultimately moveable" and that it was "not a permanent artwork". However Quinn said that his team had surveyed the location and it was not easily moved.

In a comment to The Guardian, Quinn said "Racism is a huge problem, a virus that needs to be addressed. I hope this sculpture will continue that dialogue, keep it in the forefront of people's minds, be an energy conductor. The image created by Jen that day – when she stood on the plinth with all the hope of the future of the world flowing through her – made the possibility of greater change feel more real than it has before." In a joint statement Quinn and Reid wrote "Jen and I are not putting this sculpture on the plinth as a permanent solution to what should be there – it's a spark which we hope will help to bring continued attention to this vital and pressing issue. We want to keep highlighting the unacceptable problem of institutionalised and systemic racism that everyone has a duty to face up to. This sculpture had to happen in the public realm now: this is not a new issue, but it feels like there's been a global tipping point. It's time for direct action now."

== Removal ==
Rees, the mayor, said the statue did not have permission to be installed, and would be removed. He had previously said that the future of the plinth would be decided by the people of Bristol. Bristol City Council removed the statue on the morning of 16 July, and said it would be held in its museum "for the artist to collect or donate to our collection". At Rees' request, Quinn covered the cost of the removal. Quinn stated that he would offer a maquette of the statue to the museum.

Later that summer a planning services company retroactively applied to Bristol City Council for planning permission for a two-year installation of the statue on the plinth. The Council made "a conscious decision not to proceed with the processing of those applications" because the We Are Bristol History Commission set up by mayor Marvin Rees was considering a wide range of issues about the city's past. The company lodged an appeal in March 2021, leaving the decision to be made by a planning inspector at a later date.

== Reactions ==
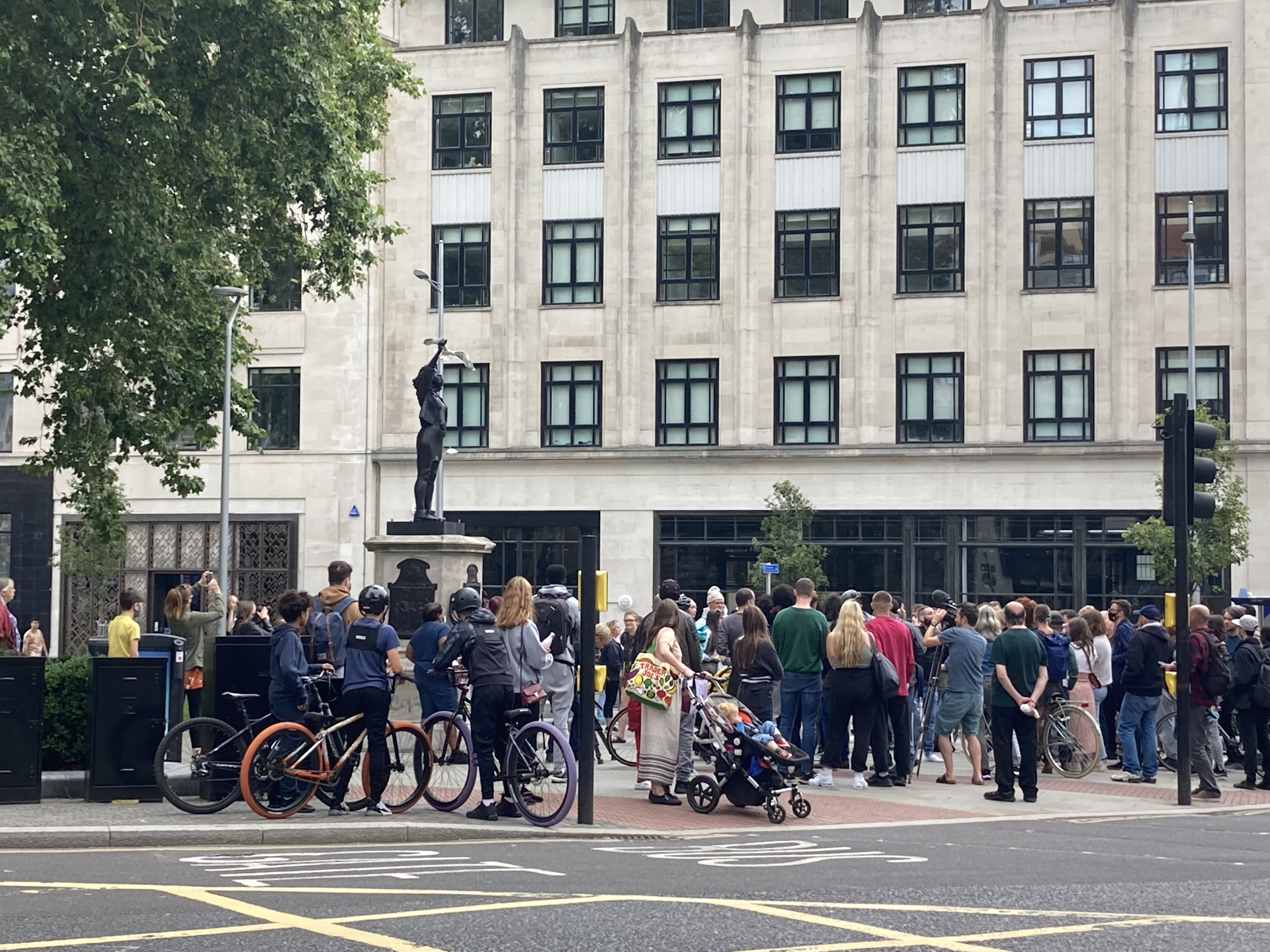
A crowd observing the statue on 15 July 2020

The erection of the statue was met with both praise and criticism. The Guardian reported that, during its short time on the plinth, the statue was mostly popular with passersby in Bristol. A group was reported gathering in objection to the statue, while others took photos, or took the knee. Booker Prize-winning author Bernardine Evaristo described it as "demonstrable commitment to the cause of Black Lives Matter in that it shows active allyship" and addressed the lack of public statues of black women in the UK.

In his Daily Telegraph review, art critic Alastair Sooke interpreted the erection of the sculpture as "a vainglorious stunt". The sculptor Thomas J. Price described the work as a "PR stunt and con", suggesting that it was about Quinn profiting himself. Price said: "a genuine example of allyship could have been to give the financial support and production facilities required for a young, local, Black artist to make the temporary replacement. This would have positioned Black voices into a genuinely powerful position to reclaim their history in an authentic way. Instead, a moment of social change that should have been about bringing equality and real opportunities to Black people has been hijacked."

Charlotte Jansen, writing for Elephant Magazine, noted Quinn’s previous lack of interest in the themes of racism, colonialism and black history in Britain and that he had proved a lack of understanding of systemic racism by taking up space and centering himself in the narrative around the Colston Plinth.

In an article for Art Review, Kadish Morris suggested that Quinn and Reid’s use of the term ‘collaboration’ to describe the work could serve as a loophole for the artist to avoid the charge of exploitation. Morris writes: "It’s easy to be enchanted by visibility, but quick-fix reactionary gestures are flimsy grounds to fight antiblackness upon. Sculptures created by white men that bypass democratic processes (for which activists in Bristol have campaigned, for too long) are not the kinds of radical justice we need to see in the arts and culture sector."
