= Madge Dresser =

English historian

Madge Judith Dresser is an English historian and academic, who was formerly an Associate Professor in History at the University of the West of England, and is currently Honorary Professor in the department of Historical Studies at the University of Bristol. Her specialities are the history of slavery, national identity, women's history, and the position of religious and ethnic minorities in British society. Dresser has frequently made efforts to acknowledge the role of Edward Colston in Bristol's slave trade industry, and has researched links between British country houses and the slave trade. Dresser is a Fellow of the Royal Historical Society and the Royal Society of Arts.

== Life ==
Dresser earned a Bachelor of Arts from the University of California, a Master of Science at the London School of Economics, and a postgraduate diploma in radio, film and television from the University of Bristol. She earned her PhD at the University of the West of England.

Dresser was formerly an Associate Professor in History at the University of the West of England, and is currently Honorary Professor in the department of Historical Studies at the University of Bristol. Her specialities are the history of slavery, national identity, women's history, and the position of religious and ethnic minorities in British society. She was a founder member of the Bristol Broadsides collective which promoted and published alternative histories of Bristol. Dresser worked with Historic England and the National Trust to identify links between slavery and heritage properties in Britain, publishing Slavery and the British Country House with Andrew Hann in 2013. In 2016 she contributed to the Oxford Dictionary of National Biography, writing entries for Thomas Daniel and Sarah Guppy. She also contributed to numerous radio and television programmes.

Dresser was active in Journey to Justice, a Bristol-based charity that promotes social justice and marginalised voices.

Dresser has frequently made efforts to acknowledge the role of Edward Colston in Bristol's slave trade industry, noting the "reluctance in some quarters" to mention it in relation to the statue of him. As such, she has been involved with the rewording process of the statue's plaque. She was a member of the We Are Bristol History Commission established after the Colston statue was pulled down on 7 June 2020.

Dresser is a Fellow of the Royal Historical Society and the Royal Society of Arts.

== Selected works ==
- "People’s Housing in Bristol (1870-1939)." In Bristol’s Other History, edited by I. Bild. Bristol Broadsides, 1983. ISBN 978-0906944103
- Black and White on the Buses: The 1963 Colour Bar Dispute in Bristol. Bristol Broadsides, 1986. ISBN 978-0906944301
- Slavery Obscured: The Social History of the Slave Trade in an English Provincial Port. Continuum, 2001. ISBN 978-1474291699
- The Diary of Sarah Fox née Champion, 1745–1802. Bristol Record Society, 2003. (Editor of the diaries written by Sarah Fox, and previously extracted by John Frank in 1872). ISBN 0901538256
- Bristol: Ethnic Minorities and the City 1000-2001. Phillimore Publishers, 2008. (Co-authored with Peter Fleming). ISBN 978-1860774775
- Women and the City: Bristol 1373-2000. Redcliffe Press, 2016. (Editor). ISBN 978-1908326317
