= Jen Reid =

Protester against Edward Colston statue

Jen Reid (born 2 November 1970) is a British Black Lives Matter activist from Bristol. After the statue of Edward Colston was pushed into Bristol Harbour, Reid stood on the empty plinth and made a Black Power salute. This pose was then recreated in the sculpture A Surge of Power (Jen Reid) 2020.

== 7 June 2020 ==
On 7 June 2020, at a Black Lives Matter protest in Bristol following the murder of George Floyd, a statue of Edward Colston was toppled and pushed into the nearby Bristol Harbour. Seventeenth-century merchant Edward Colston had become a figure of controversy in Bristol due to his involvement in the slave trade. Reid stood upon the now empty plinth and raised her fist in a Black Power salute. Her husband took a photograph and posted it on Instagram, and it was quickly transmitted worldwide. She later told ITV News "It was a spontaneous action".

Frances Lincoln Publishers announced in 2021 that they would be releasing a picture book made by Reid and US author Angela Joy which is based upon the June 2020 events. A BBC Radio 4 series called Descendants profiled Reid in its first episode in May 2021. A mural featuring a portrait of Reid was painted by London artist Mr Cenz in Stokes Croft.

== A Surge of Power (Jen Reid) 2020 ==
Having seen the photograph of Jen Reid on social media, artist Marc Quinn contacted her and they agreed to make a sculpture of her recreating the raised fist pose to put upon the still empty plinth. Following a 3D scan of Reid made at Quinn's London studio A Surge of Power (Jen Reid) 2020 was created in black resin and placed upon the plinth on the morning of 15 July 2020. Reid told BBC News "This sculpture is about making a stand for my mother, for my daughter, for black people like me". The statue was removed the following day by Bristol City Council.

== Personal and professional life ==
Reid was born on 2 November 1970. She claims that one of her grandmothers was an enslaved African.

Reid launched a fashion brand called Big Stush in 2022. Reid is one of the authors of A Hero Like Me, an illustrated children's book inspired by the events of 7 June 2020 which was published in 2023.
