= H. J. Wilkins =

British vicar that exposed Colston's slave links

Henry John Wilkins
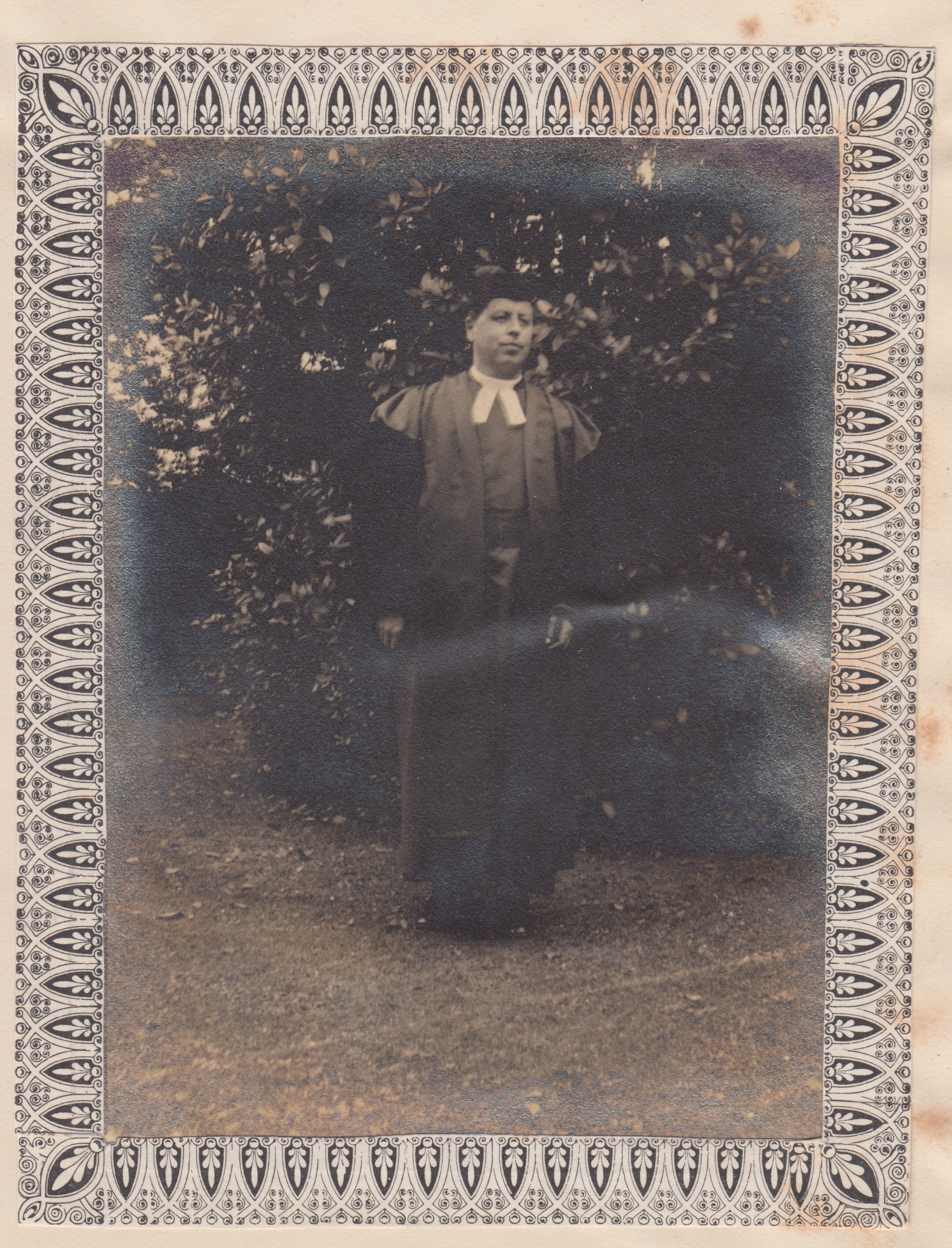
- Known as H.J. Wilkins
- Born: November 17, 1865; Berkshire
- Died: June 23, 1941 (aged 75); Bristol
- Occupations: Vicar and scholar
- Years active: 1889-1941
- Known for: Being the first person in modern times to write about Edward Colston's involvement with the Atlantic slave trade

Henry John Wilkins (17 November 1865 – 23 June 1941) was a British vicar and scholar. H.J. Wilkins uncovered the extent of Edward Colston's involvement in the Atlantic slave trade by publishing Edward Colston 1636-1721 A.D. A Chronological Account of His Life and Work. 100 years later, in 2020, the toppling of Colston's statue in Bristol for this role in the slave trade was widely reported internationally.

Professor Richard Coates of University of the West of England wrote his biography in 2017: Wilkins of Westbury & Redland: the life and writings of Rev Dr Henry John Wilkins (1865-1941), published by ALHA Books.

== Career and views ==
H.J. Wilkins was born in Berkshire on 17 November 1865. Wilkins was president at Oxford High School for Boys. He read literae humaniores at New College and St Catherine's, Oxford, graduating with honours in 1887. After teaching classics for a year he was ordained in 1889. From 1890 to 1900 he was curate then vicar of St Jude's, then a deprived inner city parish and neighborhood where he lived at 39 Little George Street, and was held in high esteem in the parish. Wilkins was then rector of Westbury-on-Trym and minister of Redland Chapel from 1900 until his death on 23 June 1941. In 1922 he was described by Caine in Manx Quarterly as "a learned and industrious antiquarian, a great lover of books, humanist, smoker, and bachelor, a man of broad sympathies, humorist with just enough of the cynic in his composition to lend piquancy to his conversation".

His biographer Professor Richard Coates described the early Wilkins as a "progressive force in local politics". In the 1895 Bristol East parliamentary by-election, Wilkins, as Vicar of St Jude's, supported the Liberal candidate William Wills, who won by 182 votes. On 18 January 1895 Wilkins unsuccessfully stood in the election for Bristol School Board as an independent candidate, gaining 5,651 votes and coming nineteenth place in a contest for fifteen seats.

In 1892, Crossley Evans reports, that Wilkins "was praised for his Christian work amongst the transient population of the lodging and doss houses of his slum parish" by the Bristol Christian Leader. In 1893 Wilkins wrote a section on housing for the poor for the book Bristol in 1898, a two-volume portrait of the city. In 1893 Wilkins also wrote What Can Be Done to Promote the Better Housing of the Poor in Bristol? An Appeal to the Citizens and Women of Bristol. In Bristol's Other History, in 1983, Dresser notes WIlkins' estimate that 1,000 people per week passed through the lodging houses of St Jude's alone, along with his assertions that the "women inhabitants were mainly prostitutes" and dismissal of the men as "idle vagabonds". Dresser said "it is difficult to know whether to believe him, as Victorian vicars were often narrow in their judgements. But by all accounts the St Jude's doss houses around St Annes and Wade Street were filthy, overcrowded and brutalising places". In an interview on slavery 37 years later Dresser appears to acknowledge Wilkins as less conservative than others in the Church of England.

Wilkins continued advocacy for housing and facilities for the poor along after leaving slum parish St Jude's in 1900: in 1938 he wrote for the Western Daily Press an appeal that the deconsecrated church of St Matthias on the Weir be used as a facility for "down and out" men of neighbouring St Jude's.

In 1904 Wilkins spoke about his support for 'rational Sunday recreation' in an interview with the Bristol Mercury newspaper, as covered by Port Pirie Recorder and North Western Mail in Australia: speaking in favour of working men's clubs opening after noon on a Sunday, in support for the petition for Bristol's art gallery to open on a Sunday and finding it a "dull and stupid day".

In 1919 Wilkins controversially made a public appeal against obelisks as war memorials to World War I on the basis that they were a heathen symbol.

In 1920 Wilkins produced and authored the second episode of the Bristol Pageant Cradle of Empire, concerning Edward IV's visit against the backdrop of the Wars of the Roses. The pageant did not perform well in terms of sales at the British Empire Exhibition and The Times judged the Bristol Pageant "deserved more support than it gained".

In the same year Wilkins published his most influential book Edward Colston (1636-1721 A.D.), a chronological account of his life and work together with an account of the Colston Societies and Memorials in Bristol. In a 2022 article Path of resistance: a timeline of protest against Edward Colston, The Guardian describes Wikins' account as "the first in the modern era to question the image built around Colston and to ask if such veneration is appropriate for a man who traded in human beings". The Bristol Post reported of the book about Colston "for the first time, his involvement in running the Royal Africa Company & his links to Bristol’s Society of Merchant Venturers are published".

In later life Wilkins was critical of the Church of England, at least in Bristol; in 1938 questioning the efficacy of its methods, vision and willingness to influence social issues "outside the ordinary parochial activities".

In 1906 he was made Doctor of Divinity by Oxford University. In 1922 was elected a fellow of the Royal Astronomical Society.

=== Selected written works ===
- What Can Be Done to Promote the Better Housing of the Poor in Bristol? An Appeal to the Citizens and Women of Bristol (1893)
- The history of divorce and re-marriage for English churchmen (1910)
- Was John Wycliffe a Negligent Pluralist (1915)
- Westbury College from a. 1194 to 1544 A.D. (1917)
- Edward Colston (1636-1721 A.D.), a chronological account of his life and work together with an account of the Colston Societies and Memorials in Bristol (1920)
- A further criticism of the psychical claims concerning Glastonbury Abbey and of the recent excavations (1923)

== Reception and legacy ==
In the years that followed publication of his Colston book Wilkins campaigned for the reassessment of Colston's legacy, what he called the "cult of Colston". This included his biased philanthropy that refused to support children who were not Church of England or whose parents were not Conservative Party supporters. Wilkins published further information on Colston as a money lender to other slave traders and publicly called for an end to Colston Day. The Western Daily Press backed his campaign.

In 1927 the church acknowledged Colston's slave trading past for the first time in a sermon by the Dean of Bristol, but sought to downplay it. In 1930 and 1937 further Colston Day sermons at Bristol Cathedral defended Colston. A 1934 Guide to Bristol dropped references to Colston.

In the book Diversity of Belonging in Europe Turunen concluded that "although Colston’s involvement in the slave trade was already made public in 1920 by H. J. Wilkins – only 25 years after the erection of the statue – this rather one-sided focus on celebrating Colston as a Bristolian philanthropist continued until the 1990s".

In 2022 Richards assessed the contemporary influence of Wilkins work: "Despite Wilkins’ well-documented study, several organizations continued celebrating the Colston legend they inherited." He also said, "Yet, the vicar’s book had some effect. Colston Day celebrations continued but the construction of new Colston monuments in common spaces slowed, then quietly stopped".

Also in 2022 a University of Bristol student newspaper covered a public lecture on slavery by historian Dr Richard Stone, reporting "He referred to Rev. H.J Wilkins, a local historian who wrote what should have been a groundbreaking expose of Colston in 1920, but was largely drowned out by the zeal with which the trader was venerated."

In the twentieth century Colston's legacy was challenged several times, with Wilkins' research often cited. Examples included renaming the Colston Hall to Bristol Beacon, schools named for Colston resolving to change or not change names, or considering whether the Colston debate is a 'proxy battle'.

In 2020 the statue of Colston in Bristol was toppled to headlines nationally and internationally. This led several institutions to cite Wilkins' research in reviewing or clarifying their historic relationship with Colston - for example University of Bristol and the Society of Merchant Venturers - or in reviewing links to slavery more generally.

In 2014 the Bishop of Bristol stated that Colston's slavery links were 'speculation'. In 2023 the Consistory Court of the Diocese of Bristol drew heavily on Wilkins work when unanimously voting to remove four stained glass panels in St Mary, Redcliffe containing a dedication to Edward Colston.

After the time of the toppling of Colston's statue, Wilkins historical research not related to Colston has faced questions over its accuracy.

In 2021 the Bristol Radical History group marked a "century of dissent and protest" about Colston, since the publication of Wilkins book in 1920.
