= Statue of Edward Colston =

Statue in Bristol, England, toppled 2020

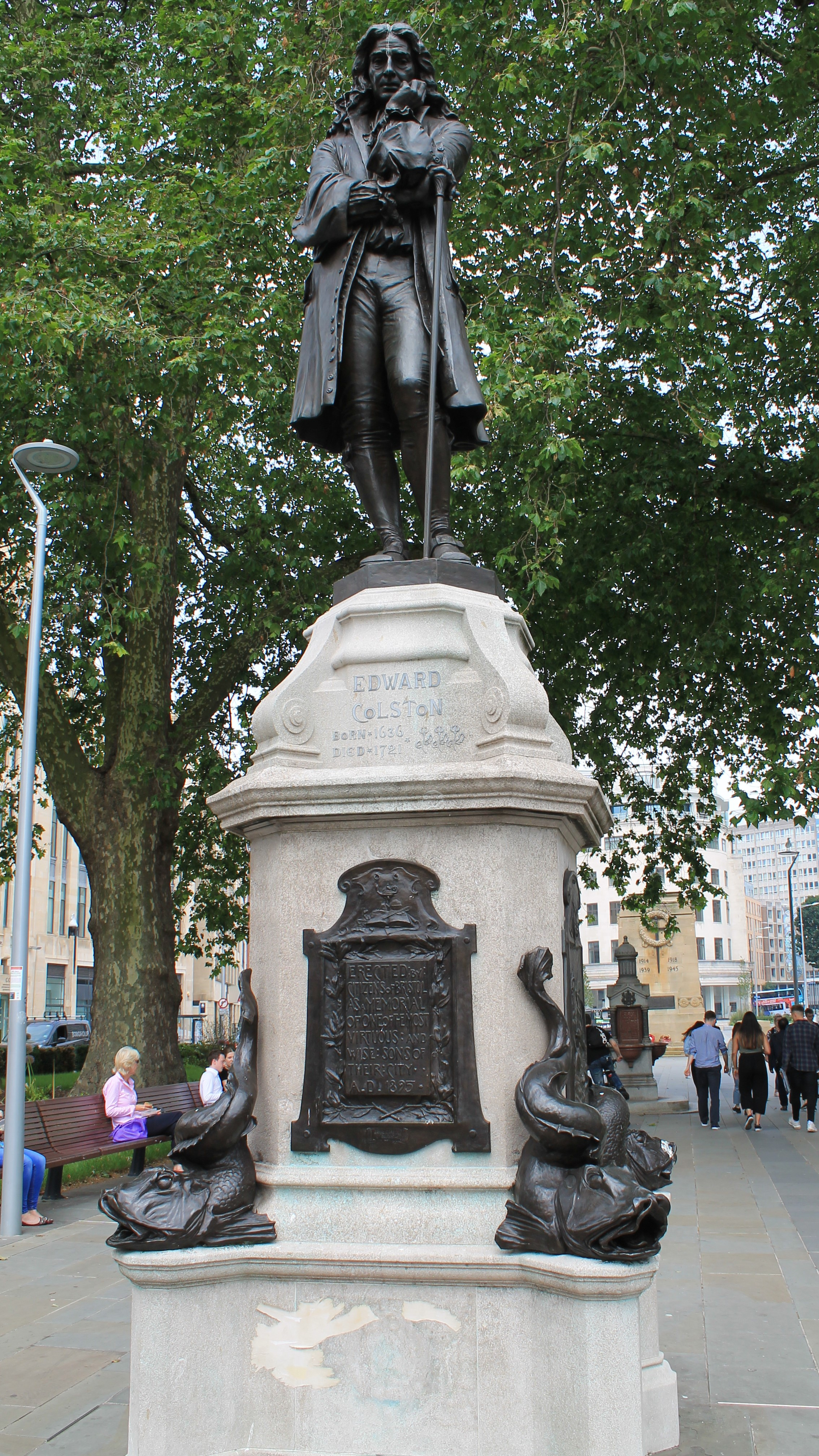
- The statue in 2019
- Artist: John Cassidy
- Completion date: 13 November 1895; 130 years ago
- Medium: Bronze
- Subject: Edward Colston
- Condition: Figure toppled, damaged and removed; plinth defaced by demonstrators
- Location: Bristol, England

Listed Building – Grade II
- Official name: Statue of Edward Colston
- Designated: 4 March 1977
- Reference no.: 1202137

The statue of Edward Colston is a bronze statue of Bristol-born merchant and transatlantic slave trader Edward Colston (1636–1721). It was created in 1895 by the Irish sculptor John Cassidy and was formerly situated on a plinth of Portland stone in a public space known as The Centre in Bristol, until it was toppled by anti-racism protestors in 2020.

Designated a Grade II listed structure in 1977, the statue was the subject of controversy due to Colston's role in organising the Atlantic slave trade as a senior executive of the Royal African Company. From the 1990s onward the debate on the morality of glorifying Colston intensified. In 2018 Bristol City Council proposed to add a second plaque to better contextualise the statue and summarise Colston's role in the slave trade, but this was delayed by disputes over the wording of the plaque.

On 7 June 2020, the statue was toppled, defaced, and pushed into Bristol Harbour during the George Floyd protests related to the Black Lives Matter movement. The plinth was also covered in graffiti but remains in place. The statue was recovered from the harbour and put into storage by Bristol City Council on 11 June 2020, and exhibited in its graffitied state in the M Shed museum during the summer of 2021, and permanently from March 2024. Four people who helped topple the statue were found not guilty of criminal damage by a jury in January 2022. On 17 April 2025, a new plaque was installed on the empty plinth, removing the reference to Colston as a "city benefactor" and outlining the statue's removal in light of his involvement in the transatlantic slave trade.

== Description ==
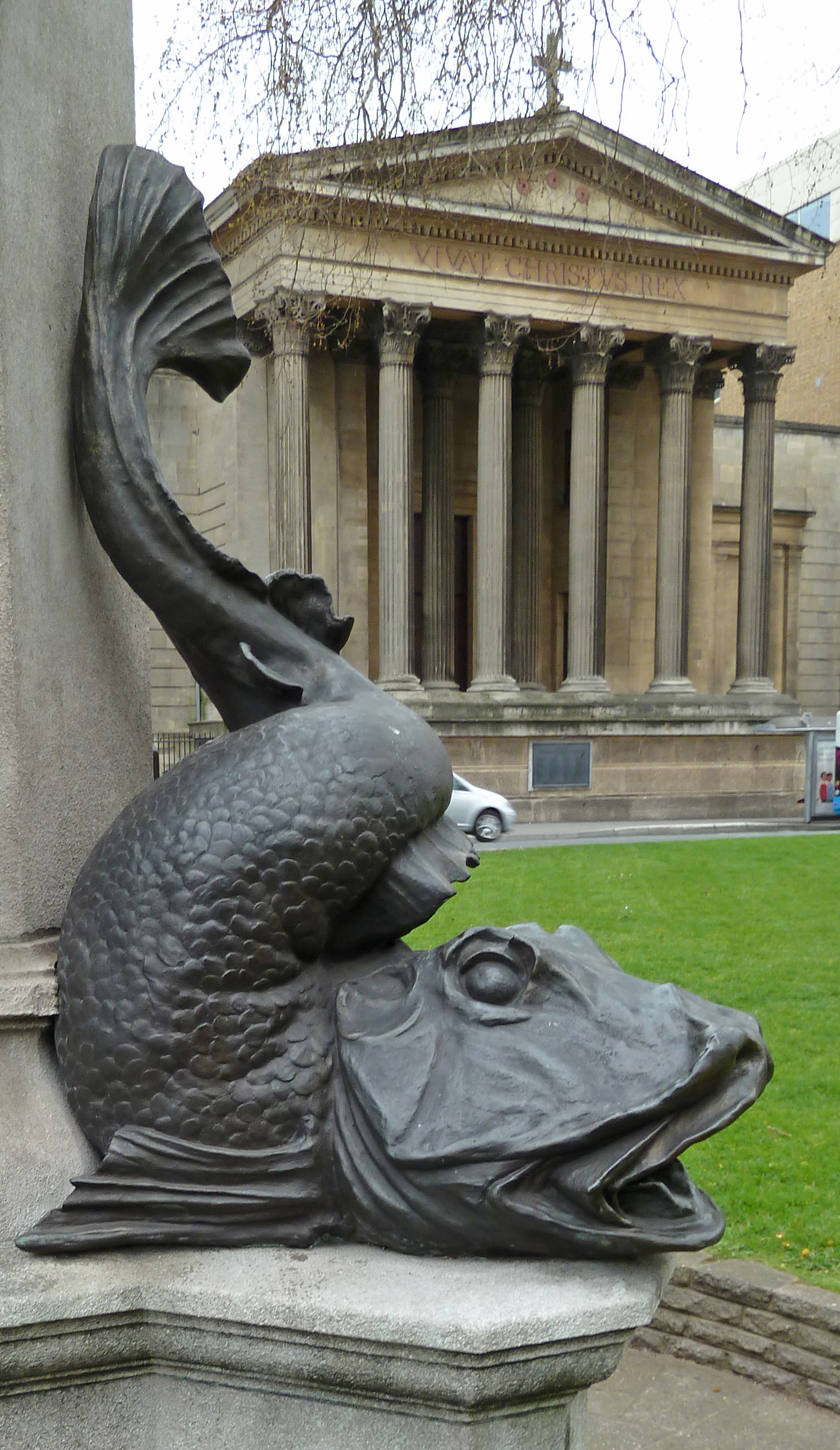
Detail of one of the dolphins

The monument originally consisted of an 8 ft 8 in (2.64 m) bronze statue of Edward Colston (1636–1721) set on top of a 10 ft 6 in (3.20 m) plinth. The statue depicts Colston in a flowing wig, velvet coat, satin waistcoat, and knee-breeches as was typical in his day. The plinth is made of Portland stone and adorned with bronze plaques and, in each corner, a figure of a dolphin. Of the four plaques‍—‌one on each face of the plinth‍—‌three are relief sculptures in an Art Nouveau style: two of these depict scenes from Colston's life and the third exhibits a maritime fantasy. The plaque on the south face bears the words "Erected by citizens of Bristol as a memorial of one of the most virtuous and wise sons of their city AD 1895" and "John Cassidy fecit" (John Cassidy made this).

== Background ==
=== Edward Colston ===
Colston was a Bristol-born merchant who made some of his fortune from the slave trade, particularly between 1680 and 1692. He was an active member of the Royal African Company, and was briefly deputy governor in 1689–90. During his tenure, the Company transported an estimated 84,000 slaves from West Africa to the Americas. Colston used his wealth to provide financial support to almshouses, hospitals, schools, workhouses and churches throughout England, particularly in his home city of Bristol; he represented the Bristol constituency as its Member of Parliament from 1710 to 1713. He left £71,000 to charities after his death, as well as £100,000 to members of his family. In the 19th century he was seen as a philanthropist. The fact that some of his fortune was made in the slave trade was largely ignored until the 1990s.

=== Statue ===
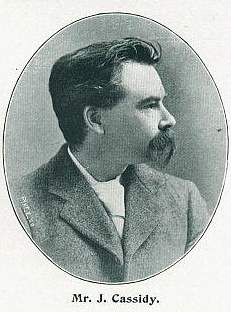
Irish sculptor John Cassidy

The statue was erected in 1895, at the height of a "statue mania" - a time when thousands of statues of historical, imperial figures were erected as part of the 'invention of tradition' occurring during this period of emerging modern nations. The Bristol Corporation, worried the city was being eclipsed in importance by the likes of Birmingham, Liverpool and Manchester, joined in the 'statue mania' and established a commission to decide who should be commemorated in a new statue. Suggestions other than Colston included prominent Bristolian abolitionists. The Society of Merchant Venturers, which shared conservative views with Colston (who had been a member of the organisation), used their economic power and connections to persuade the Corporation to decide on a statue of Colston. According to Tim Cole of the University of Bristol, the Colston statue was proposed as a response to the erection of a statue depicting Edmund Burke, who had been critical of the city's involvement in the slave trade, argued for fairer taxation, and disapproved of the British government's high-handed attitude toward its colonies - ideas antithetical to those of the 19th-century merchants.

The statue, designed by Irish sculptor John Cassidy, was erected in the area now known as The Centre, ostensibly to commemorate Colston's philanthropy, with his role in and enrichment through the slave trade obscured by the organisations what lobbied for his statue. It was proposed in October 1893 by James Arrowsmith, the president of the Anchor Society; this, in March 1894, led to a committee being appointed to raise a fund.

Two appeals to Colston-related charitable bodies raised £407 towards the cost of the statue. Further funds, to a total of £650, were raised through public appeals after the unveiling, including a contribution from the Society of Merchant Venturers. Twenty-three models from sculptors were proposed to the committee, from which Cassidy's was selected. The statue was unveiled by the mayor, Howell Davies, and the bishop of Bristol, Charles Ellicott, on 13 November 1895, a date which had been referred to as Colston Day in the city.

It was designated as a Grade II listed structure on 4 March 1977. Historic England described the statue as being "handsome" and commented that "the resulting contrast of styles is handled with confidence". They also noted that the statue offers good group value with other memorials, including the statue of Edmund Burke, the Cenotaph, and a drinking fountain commemorating the Industrial and Fine Art Exhibition of 1893.

== Controversy ==
=== 20th century ===
The statue had become controversial by the end of the 20th century, as Colston's activities as a major slave trader became more widely known. H.J. Wilkins, who uncovered his slave-trading activities in 1920, commented that "we cannot picture him justly except against his historical background". Colston's involvement in the slave trade predated the abolition movement in Britain, and was during the time when "slavery was generally condoned in England—indeed, throughout Europe—by churchmen, intellectuals and the educated classes". From the 1990s onwards, campaigns and petitions called for the removal of the statue.

In 1992, the statue was depicted in the installation piece Commemoration Day by Carole Drake, as part of the Trophies of Empire exhibition at the Arnolfini, a gallery in a former tea warehouse in Bristol Harbour. Drake's installation combined a replica of the statue swinging above rotting chrysanthemums, a favourite flower of Colston, in front of a projected photograph of schoolgirls at Colston School covering his statue with flowers in 1973 and the audio of the school hymn "Rejoice ye pure in heart". In the 1994 catalogue of Trophies of Empire, Drake stated the work refers to

the blind spots in Western culture, a collective amnesia which denies the sources of wealth which built such 'trophies of empire', and the ways in which dominant white culture and its people benefit from the exploitation of other cultures and people both overseas and at home.

In January 1998, "FUCK OFF SLAVE TRADER" was written in paint on the base of the statue. Bristol City councillor Ray Sefia said: "If we in this city want to glorify the slave trade, then the statue should stay. If not, the statue should be marked with a plaque that he was a slave trader or taken down."

=== 21st century ===
Art installation, showing figures representing slaves on a ship, during Anti-Slavery Day 2018

During the early 21st century, various unofficial art interventions were made in protest at the statue: a knitted ball and chain around the figure's ankles; drops of blood marked on the plinth during the commemoration of the 2007 bicentenary of the British abolition of the slave trade; and, on 18 October 2018 to mark Anti-Slavery Day in the UK, an installation in front of the statue depicting about a hundred supine figures arranged as on a slave ship, lying as if they were cargo, surrounded by a border listing jobs typically done by modern-day slaves such as 'fruit picker' and 'nail bar worker'; it remained for some months. The labels around the bow of the ship said 'here and now'. Another artistic intervention saw a ball and chain attached to the statue.

In a 2014 poll in the local newspaper, the Bristol Post, 56 percent of the 1,100 respondents said it should stay while 44 percent wanted it to go. Others called for a memorial plaque honouring the victims of slavery to be fitted to his statue. Bristol's first elected mayor, George Ferguson, said on Twitter in 2013 that the city's annual celebration of Colston "does seem perverse", and was "not a celebration that I shall join". In August 2017 an unauthorised commemorative plaque by sculptor Will Coles was affixed to the statue's plinth, declaring that Bristol was the "Capital of the Atlantic Slave Trade 1730–1745" and memorialising "the 12,000,000 enslaved of whom 6,000,000 died as captives". Coles stated that his aim was "to try to get people to think". The plaque was removed by Bristol City Council in October of the same year. In 2018, Thangam Debbonaire, Labour MP for Bristol West, wrote to Bristol City Council calling for the removal of the statue.

==== Project to add a second plaque ====
In July 2018 Bristol City Council, which was responsible for the statue, made a planning application to add a second plaque which would "add to the public knowledge about Colston" including his philanthropy and his involvement in slave trading. The initial proposed wording for the plaque was developed as part of a project involving University of Bristol associate professor of history Madge Dresser, other local historians, and children from Cotham Gardens Primary School (formerly Colston Primary School). It mentioned Colston's role in the slave trade, his brief tenure as a Tory MP for Bristol, and criticised his philanthropy as religiously selective:

As a high official of the Royal African Company from 1680 to 1692, Edward Colston played an active role in the enslavement of over 84,000 Africans (including 12,000 children) of whom over 19,000 died en route to the Caribbean and America.

Colston also invested in the Spanish slave trade and in slave-produced sugar. As Tory MP for Bristol (1710–1713), he defended the city's 'right' to trade in enslaved Africans.

Bristolians who did not subscribe to his religious and political beliefs were not permitted to benefit from his charities.

This wording attracted criticism, including from Conservative councillor Richard Eddy who called the initial suggested wording "revisionist" and "historically illiterate" and suggested that, if it were put up, stealing or damaging it might be justified. He also said it was unfair to mention that Colston had been a Tory MP.

A second version, co-written by Madge Dresser and a council officer, was proposed by the council in August 2018, giving a brief description of Colston's philanthropy, role in the slave trade, and time as an MP, while noting that he was now considered controversial. However, this wording was further revised by Francis Greenacre – a former fine art curator at the Bristol Museum and Art Gallery, and a member of the Society of Merchant Venturers which Colston had also been part of – to create a third proposal:

Edward Colston (1636–1721), MP for Bristol (1710–1713), was one of this city's greatest benefactors.

He supported and endowed schools, almshouses, hospitals and churches in Bristol, London and elsewhere. Many of his charitable foundations continue. This statue was erected in 1895 to commemorate his philanthropy.

A significant proportion of Colston's wealth came from investments in slave trading, sugar and other slave-produced goods.

As an official of the Royal African Company from 1680 to 1692, he was also involved in the transportation of approximately 84,000 enslaved African men, women and young children, of whom 19,000 died on voyages from West Africa to the Caribbean and the Americas.

Greenacre's revisions were criticised by Dresser, who said the version was a "sanitised" version of history which minimised Colston's role in the slave trade, omitted the number of child slaves, and focused on West Africans as enslavers. Nevertheless, the wording was understood to have been agreed upon and a bronze plaque was cast using Greenacre's wording.

After the plaque was manufactured in March 2019, the wording was objected to by Bristol's mayor, Marvin Rees, who said he had not been consulted on the wording and criticised the Society of Merchant Venturers for its involvement in the revision. A statement from Rees' office said the Merchant Venturers had been "extremely naive" to think they would have the final say on the wording, and that it was "an oversight to put it mildly" to not consult with the mayor. The statement committed to creating a revised wording for the plaque as part of wider work around the legacy of the slave trade; a plaque with no mention of Colston as a "city benefactor" was finally installed on the empty plinth in April 2025.

After the toppling of the statue in June 2020, the Society of Merchant Venturers said it had been "inappropriate" for the society to have become involved in the rewording of the plaque in 2018.

== Toppling and removal ==
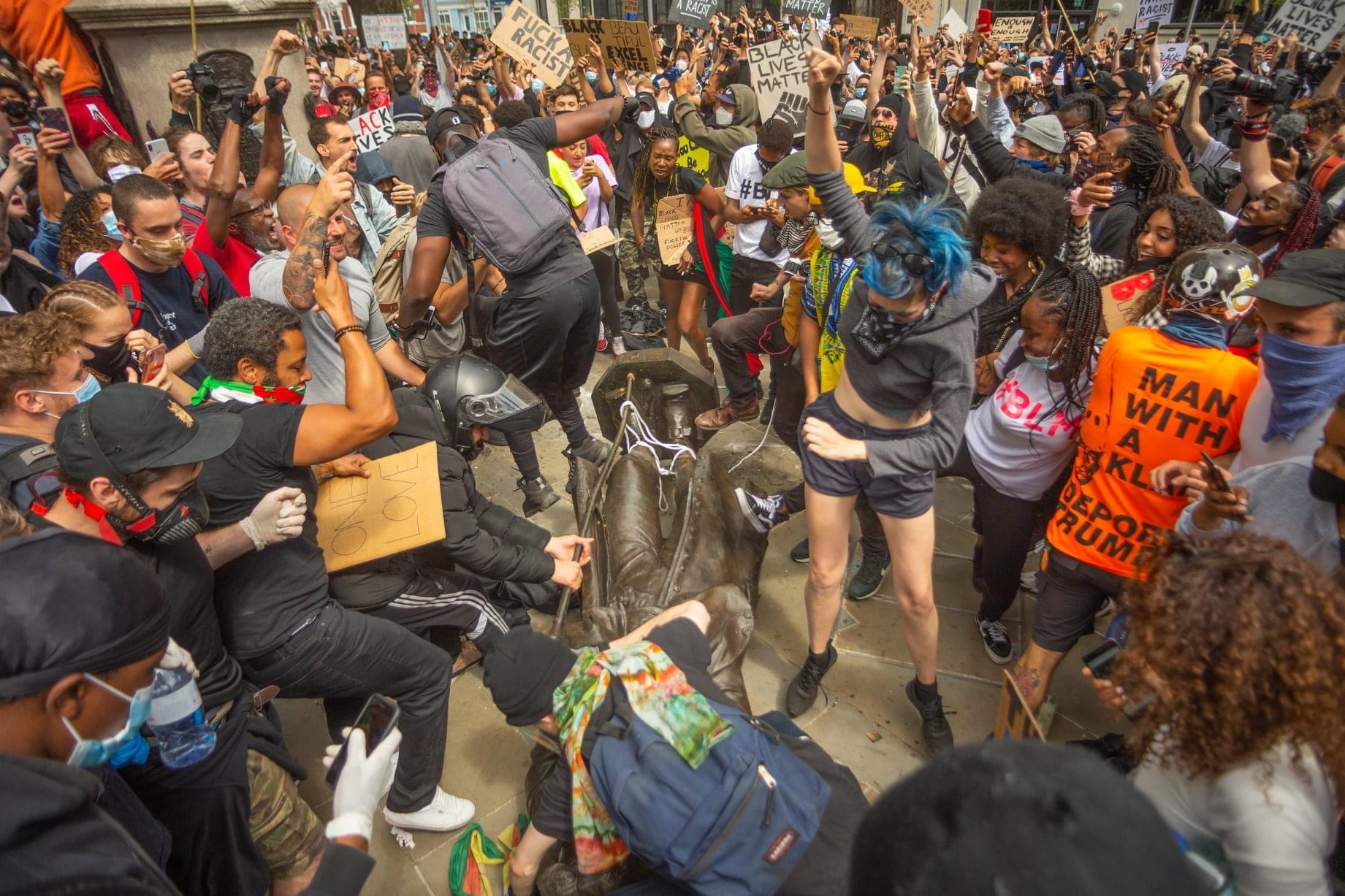
Protestors with the toppled statue

On 7 June 2020, during the global protests following the murder of George Floyd in the United States, the statue was pulled down by demonstrators who then jumped on it. They daubed it in red and blue paint, and one protester was shown kneeling on the statue's neck, alluding to the way Floyd was murdered. The statue was then rolled down Anchor Road and pushed into Bristol Harbour. Just prior to this, a petition to the council to remove the statue, sent out to 38 Degrees “an online campaigning organisation, involving more than 2 million people from every corner of the UK”, had received over 11,000 signatures.

Superintendent Andy Bennett of Avon and Somerset Police stated that they had made a "tactical decision" not to intervene and had allowed the statue to be toppled, citing a concern that stopping the act could have led to further violence and a riot. They also stated that the act was criminal damage and confirmed that there would be an investigation to identify those involved, adding that they were in the process of collating footage of the incident.

=== Reaction ===
On 7 June 2020 the Home Secretary, Priti Patel, called the toppling "utterly disgraceful", "completely unacceptable" and "sheer vandalism". She added, "it speaks to the acts of public disorder that have become a distraction from the cause people are protesting about." The Mayor of Bristol, Marvin Rees, said those comments showed an "absolute lack of understanding".

On 8 June, Rees said that the statue was an affront, and he felt no "sense of loss [at its removal]," but that the statue would be retrieved "at some point" and it was "highly likely that the Colston statue will end up in one of our museums." The historian and television presenter David Olusoga commented that the statue should have been taken down earlier, saying: "Statues are about saying 'this was a great man who did great things'. That is not true, he [Colston] was a slave trader and a murderer." Police Superintendent Andy Bennett also stated he understood that Colston was "a historical figure that's caused the black community quite a lot of angst over the last couple of years", adding: "Whilst I am disappointed that people would damage one of our statues, I do understand why it's happened, it's very symbolic."

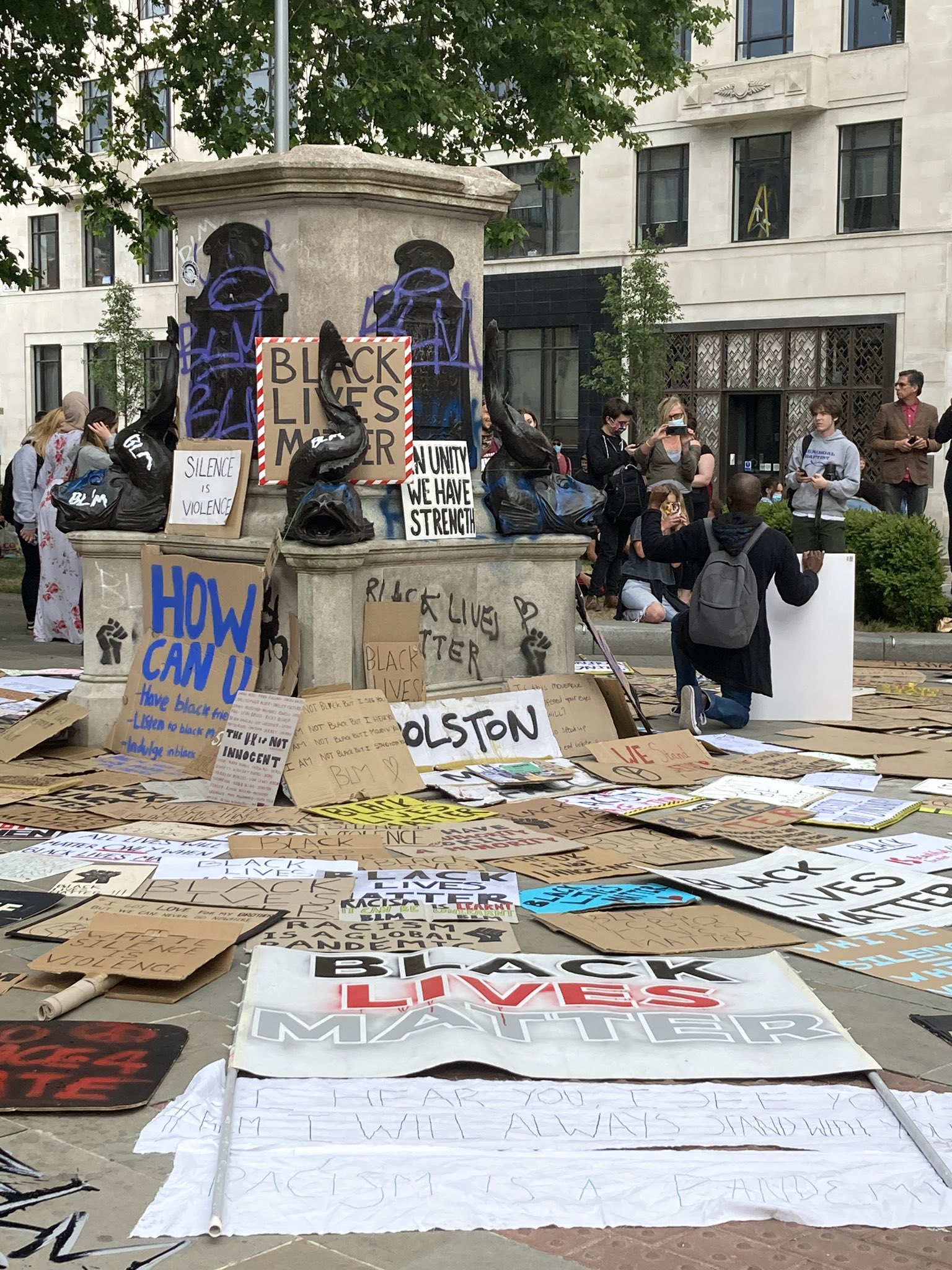
The empty pedestal, showing placards and graffiti

Rees made a statement suggesting that "it's important to listen to those who found the statue to represent an affront to humanity and make the legacy of today about the future of our city, tackling racism and inequality. I call on everyone to challenge racism and inequality in every corner of our city and wherever we see it." In an interview with Krishnan Guru-Murthy, he said: "We have a statue of someone who made their money by throwing our people into water ... and now he's on the bottom of the water."

A spokesperson for Boris Johnson, the Prime Minister, said that he "absolutely understands the strength of feeling" but insisted that the democratic process should have been followed, and that police should hold responsible those involved in the criminal act. Labour leader Keir Starmer said while the manner in which the statue had been pulled down was "completely wrong", it should have been removed "a long, long time ago". He added "you can't, in 21st Century Britain, have a slaver on a statue. That statue should have been brought down properly, with consent, and put in a museum."

The Society of Merchant Venturers, in a statement on 12 June 2020, said that "the fact that [the statue] has gone is right for Bristol. To build a city where racism and inequality no longer exist, we must start by acknowledging Bristol's dark past and removing statues, portraits and names that memorialise a man who benefitted from trading in human lives." A descendant of Colston, Philip Colston Robins, wrote to the Mayor of Bristol suggesting that the city should honour moral obligations and "make peace with the past", including development aid and twinning with cities in West Africa affected by the slave trade.

=== Retrieval and storage ===
At 5 am on 11 June 2020, the statue was retrieved from Bristol Harbour by Bristol City Council. The statue was found filled with mud and sediments from the harbour floor. The council said the statue was structurally stable, although it had lost one of its coattails, the walking stick, and faced damage to its left side and to the foot. They stated they had cleaned the statue to prevent corrosion, and that they planned to exhibit it in a museum without removing the graffiti and ropes placed on it by the protesters. While cleaning mud from the statue, M Shed discovered an 1895 issue of Tit-Bits magazine containing a handwritten date, 26 October 1895, and the names of those who originally fitted the statue.

=== Police investigation ===
The day after the toppling, the police announced that they identified 17 people in connection with the incident, but had not yet made any arrests. On 22 June 2020 the police released images of people connected to the incident, and asked the public for help identifying the individuals. On 1 July, an unnamed 24-year-old man was arrested on suspicion of criminal damage to the statue and was bailed under police investigation. In September 2020, Avon and Somerset Police said that files on four people suspected of criminal damage had been passed to the Crown Prosecution Service to decide if charges should be brought. A further five people had been offered restorative justice, such as a fine and community service. By 1 October 2020, a total of six people had accepted conditional cautions relating to the events of 7 June.

=== Criminal charges and trial ===
On 9 December 2020, four people—Rhian Graham, Milo Ponsford, Jake Skuse and Sage Willoughby, often referred to as the "Colston 4"—were charged with causing criminal damage in relation to the toppling of the statue. They appeared at Bristol Magistrates' Court on 2 March 2021 and entered a plea of not guilty. Their trial began at Bristol Crown Court on 13 December 2021. Before the trial, the graffiti artist Banksy produced a T-shirt to be sold to support the accused.

The four did not deny that they toppled the statue, but advanced several defences that doing so was not an act of criminal damage within the meaning of the law. One defence was that the statue had not in fact been damaged—indeed that it had been made more valuable by the process of toppling, removal from the harbour, and display in the museum. A second was that the removal of the statue helped to prevent another crime, because the display of the statue itself was a criminal act of displaying indecent or abusive material, saying Colston's "continued veneration (...) in a vibrant multicultural city was an act of abuse". Two defendants also argued that they believed the statue was collectively owned by the people of Bristol, who in the circumstances would agree with the act of toppling it. In fact the statue was owned by Bristol City Council, but even a mistaken belief about the owner and the owners' intentions would have been grounds for acquittal, if the jury felt that belief was sincerely held. The judge also advised the jury that even if not convinced by any of these arguments, the jury could still acquit on the basis that a conviction for criminal damage would, in the circumstances, represent a disproportionate interference with the defendants' right of freedom of expression. The jury would have to weigh the importance of property-owners' rights not to have property (e.g. statues) damaged, with the right to freedom of expression.

On 5 January 2022, the jury found the four defendants not guilty of criminal damage by a majority of 11 to 1 after deliberating for three hours. Because juries never provide any rationale or documentation for their verdict, it is unclear which of the defence arguments they found persuasive. While stating that "trial by jury is an important guardian of liberty and must not be undermined", Suella Braverman, the attorney general, said she is "carefully considering" whether to refer the case to the Court of Appeal as the result was "causing confusion". Braverman's statement was alleged by former Director of Public Prosecutions, Ken Macdonald, and shadow attorney general, Emily Thornberry, to be politically motivated.

On 12 April 2022, Braverman referred the case to the Court of Appeal, to seek clarification on whether defendants can cite their human rights as a defence in a case of criminal damage. The ruling by the Court of Appeal, which did not affect the jury acquittal in the original case, was handed down on 28 September 2022. It ruled that defences on the basis of human rights could be made in criminal damage cases only when the value of the property damaged is low.

== After the toppling ==
The day after the toppling, 8 June, a cardboard plaque bearing the text "This plaque is dedicated to the slaves that were taken from their homes" was taped onto the plinth to cover the bronze commemorative plaque on the south face that described Colston as "virtuous and wise". After the toppling of Colston's statue, a similar monument to Robert Milligan, the slave trader who was largely responsible for the construction of the West India Docks, in east London was removed by Tower Hamlets London Borough Council on 9 June 2020. On the same day, the Mayor of London, Sadiq Khan called for London statues and street names with links to slavery to be removed or renamed. Khan set up the Commission for Diversity in the Public Realm to review London's landmarks.

Support for, and opposition to, the statue's removal continued in the Bristol area. In what a local councillor believed was retaliation, the headstone and footstone for the enslaved man Scipio Africanus were vandalised in the churchyard of St Mary's Church, Henbury, Bristol, on 17 June. The attacker broke one of the stones in two and scrawled a warning to "put Colston's statue back or things will really heat up."

After Colston's statue was removed, a petition began to have a statue of Paul Stephenson erected in its place. The former Bristol youth worker is a black man who was instrumental in the 1963 Bristol Bus Boycott, inspired by the US Montgomery bus boycott, which brought an end to a then-legal employment colour ban in Bristol bus companies.

While the plinth has remained empty, a number of unofficial statues have been placed upon it. On 11 July 2020, a mannequin dressed as deceased television presenter Jimmy Savile appeared on the plinth, along with a cardboard sign: "None of them stopped me, and your licence paid for it". The mannequin was on the plinth for about an hour, before being removed. In the early morning of 15 July 2020, a statue by Marc Quinn was placed on the empty plinth without permission from the authorities. The statue, entitled A Surge of Power (Jen Reid) 2020 depicts a Black Lives Matter protester, Jen Reid, with a raised fist. Quinn described it as a "new temporary, public installation". Bristol City Council removed the statue on the morning of 16 July and it was returned to Quinn. An application for planning permission for A Surge of Power to be installed for two years was sought in summer 2020, rejected, appealed in March 2021, and finally refused in November 2021.

On 2 December 2020, a figurine of Darth Vader appeared on the plinth, in what was seen as a tribute to the actor David Prowse, who was born in Bristol and died on 29 November 2020.

The removal of Colston's statue started a national debate on the remembrance and acknowledgement of Britain's role in the slave trade and led to the removal or redaction of other monuments, including those commemorating Robert Milligan, Tobias Rustat, John Cass, William Beckford, and Henry Dundas.

== Reinterpretation, possible replacement and permanent display ==
In September 2020, Bristol Mayor Marvin Rees set up the We Are Bristol History Commission, described as "an independent group who will: help Bristol better understand its history and how it became the city it is today; work with citizens and community groups to make sure that everyone in the city can share their views on Bristol’s history; build an improved, shared understanding of Bristol’s story for future generations." A city council spokesperson said that the commission would include the issues around the Colston statue as a starting point, and it would also address wider historic issues in the city. The Commission is chaired by Tim Cole of the University of Bristol, with other members including Madge Dresser and David Olusoga. There was criticism that the commission was dominated by academics at the expense of local community members.

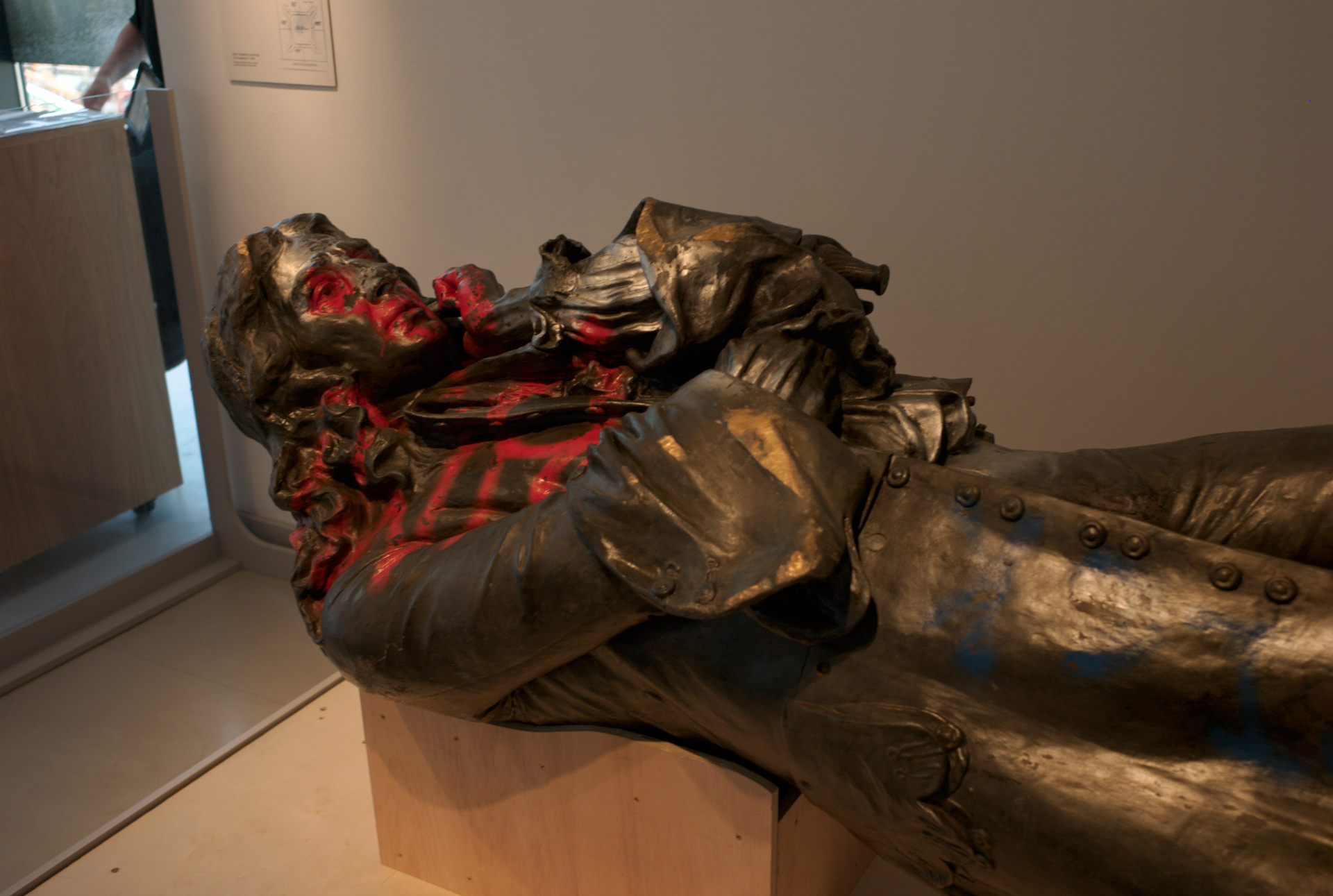
Defaced Colston statue on display at the M Shed in 2021

The Colston statue was put on exhibition from 4 June to 5 September 2021 at the M Shed museum in Bristol. It was displayed horizontally on a wooden support with the graffiti remaining. John Finch, head of culture and creative industries at Bristol City Council, stated that after considerable thought the statue was being displayed horizontally because its damaged state meant that it was "unstable" and otherwise needed expensive support, and to enable visitors to see the statue, and the graffiti and damage, close up. Some of the demonstration placards, air dried to preserve them, were displayed nearby. The museum's website stated "This temporary display is the start of a conversation, not a complete exhibition", and invited members of the public to express their views on the future of the statue and its plinth. Immediately after the statue had been put on exhibition, with entry only by free pre-booking, people who had wanted the statue to be returned to public view on its plinth block-booked the exhibit with no intention of attending so that it could not be seen by the public. In response the museum changed its online booking system: "We're always more than happy to accommodate walk-ups if we haven't reached our Covid secure capacity". After the temporary exhibition closed, the responses were considered by the We Are Bristol History Commission, with a report expected by early 2022. The Mayor would then decide the future of the statue.

On 4 August 2021, planning inspector J. P. Sargent dismissed an appeal against the city council's refusal to grant a temporary permission to reinstate, for a period of two years, Marc Quinn's statue of Jen Reid. He stated that, because no consent had been given for the Colston statue to be removed, it remained, in law, part of the whole monument and could be returned to its plinth. He stated that the "special architectural and historic interest" of the monument, which had resulted in it being listed, was partly based on the quality of the design of the statue and that "to replace it with a statue of someone else would appreciably undermine the Monument’s historic integrity."

On 3 February 2022, the We Are Bristol History Commission recommended, following public consultation, that the toppled and defaced Colston statue should be put on display in the city's museum, in its existing state, and presented in a "nuanced, contextualised and engaging way". They recommended that temporary artworks should be placed on the remaining plinth, with "periods of intentional emptiness".

In March 2024, the statue, in its defaced state, went on permanent display in Bristol's M Shed museum, as part of an exhibit about protest. On 20 November 2024, the council development control committee agreed the wording of a new plaque to be affixed to the empty plinth, removing any mention of Colston as a "city benefactor", saying:

On 13 November 1895, a statue of Edward Colston (1636 - 1721) was unveiled here.

In the late twentieth and early twenty-first century, the celebration of Colston was increasingly challenged given his prominent role in the enslavement of African people.

On 7 June 2020, the statue was pulled down during Black Lives Matter protests and rolled into Bristol Harbour. Following consultation with the city in 2021, the statue entered the collections of Bristol City Council's museums.

The plaque was installed on 17 April 2025.

== See also ==
- 1895 in art
- Actions against memorials in the United Kingdom during the George Floyd protests
- List of monuments and memorials removed during the George Floyd protests
- List of public statues of individuals linked to the Atlantic slave trade
