= Edward Colston (MP for Wells) =

English landowner and Tory politician

Edward Colston (after 1672 – 5 April 1719) was an English landowner and Tory politician who sat in the House of Commons from 1708 to 1713.

Colston was the fourth, but only surviving son of Robert Colston of Bristol and his wife Ann Waters, daughter of Robert Waters of Bristol. He married by licence dated 4 August 1704, Mary De Bert. On this marriage, his unmarried uncle, Edward Colston, a wealthy merchant, treated him as his heir, and settled a considerable amount of valuable land on him. Colston himself appears to have followed a business career in London, and by 1708 he was Governor of the City of London workhouse.

At the 1705 English general election Colston was nominated by his uncle for Parliament at Bristol in a Tory attempt to break the Whigs' hold on the city's representation, but was unsuccessful. He became an honorary freeman of the Society of Merchant Venturers at Bristol in 1708. He held the manor of Lydford West near Wells and at the 1708 British general election, he was returned unopposed as Tory Member of Parliament (MP) for Wells. He was an inactive MP but voted against the impeachment of Henry Sacheverell in 1710. At the 1710 British general election, he was returned again as Tory MP for Wells. He was listed as a 'Tory patriot' who supported peace, and a 'worthy patriot' who detected the mismanagements of the previous administration. He voted for the French commerce bill on 18 June 1713. He stood down for the 1713 British general election.

Colston died on 5 April 1719, and was buried in the Colston vault at All Saints' Church, Bristol. His only child Sarah was to be the chief beneficiary under his uncle's will, but she predeceased the uncle in 1721, and most of his fortune passed to his niece, Mary, the wife of Thomas Edwards. Colston's widow died in 1733.

Parliament of Great Britain
Preceded by Henry Seymour Portman; Maurice Berkeley	Member of Parliament for Bridgewater; 1708–1713; With: William Coward 1708–1710; Maurice Berkeley 1710–1713	Succeeded by Sir Thomas Wroth, Bt; Maurice Berkeley
