= Dolphin (heraldry) =

Heraldic animal

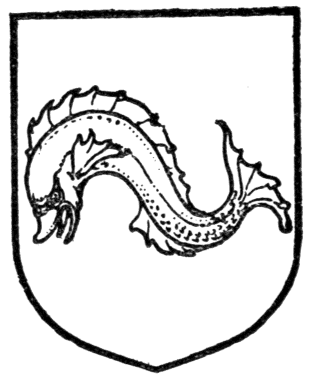
Dolphin naiant

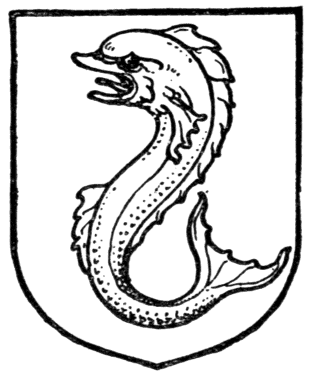
Dolphin hauriant

In heraldry, the dolphin is an ornamental creature in the form of a large fish, the mahi-mahi or dolphinfish, formerly often referred to simply as a dolphin. The heraldic dolphin thus bears little resemblance to the marine mammal of the same name.

== Attitudes ==
The dolphin is found as a charge in early heraldic representations, often with an arched back and fish-like fins. Its attitude is usually shown as "naiant" – (Old French, now present participle nageant, "swimming") that is, horizontally as though swimming in water – and "embowed", meaning with its back curved upwards, mimicking the leaping motion of a breathing dolphin. When not otherwise specified, a dolphin in heraldry is assumed to be naiant and embowed. "Torqued" refers to a variant of the embowed position where the dolphin is twisted into the form of a letter S.

Other attitudes used for heraldic dolphins are "hauriant" – that is, shown upright, as if breaching the surface for air. "Urinant" signifies the opposite position, with the dolphin diving downward. The dolphin is sometimes depicted as twined around an anchor.

== History and use ==
A dolphin azure, finned and langued gules, was the symbol of the Dauphins of Viennois. When the signorie of Dauphiné was sold to the crown of France in 1349, this was done on the condition that the French heir would afterwards be referred to as the Dauphin and use the heraldic dolphin. A dolphin in the same colors was displayed by the family of La Tour du Pin, which claimed descent from the Dauphins d'Auvergne.

Heraldic representations of dolphins also appear in the arms of many British families, and first appear in English heraldry in the thirteenth century. They are often found in the arms of coastal townships.
