= Edward Colston =

English merchant and slave trader (1636–1721)

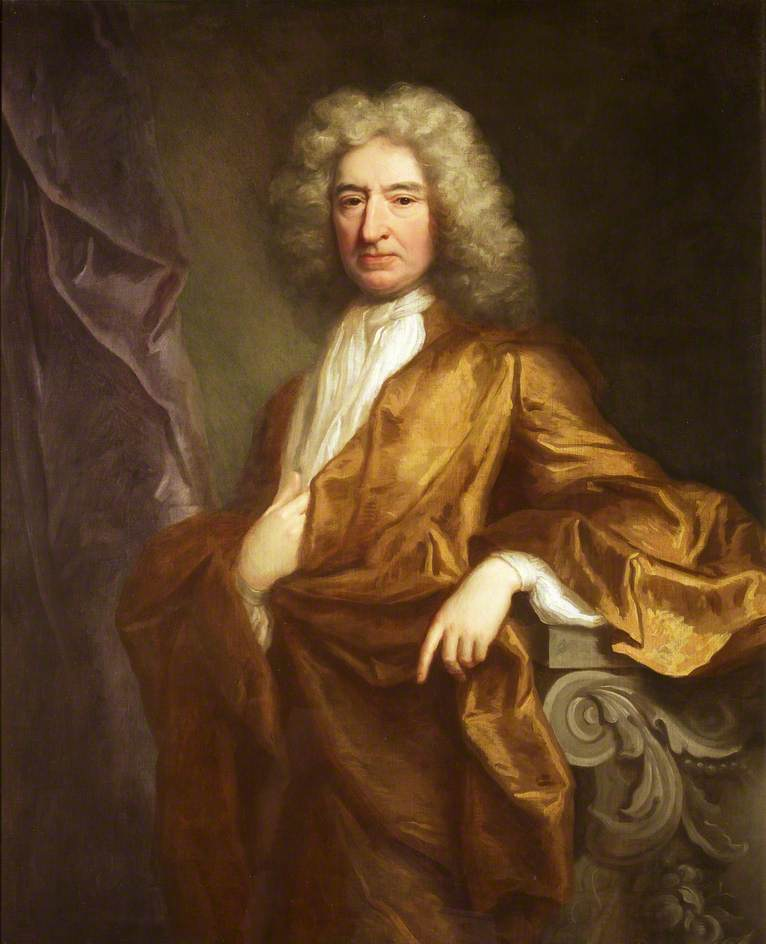

Member of Parliament for Bristol
- In office 1710–1713

Personal details
- Born: 2 November 1636 Bristol, England
- Died: 11 October 1721 (aged 84) Mortlake, Surrey, England
- Resting place: All Saints' Church, Bristol
- Party: Tory
- Relatives: Edward Colston (nephew)
- Occupation: Merchant

Edward Colston (2 November 1636 – 11 October 1721) was an English merchant, slave trader, philanthropist and Tory Member of Parliament.

Colston followed his father in the family business becoming a sea merchant, initially trading in wine, fruits and textiles, mainly in Spain, Portugal and other European ports. From 1680 to 1692 he was a member of the Royal African Company – which held a monopoly on the English trade along the west coast of Africa – trading in slaves, gold, silver and ivory. He was deputy governor of the company from 1689 to 1690 (the Governor being the Duke of York, brother of Charles II of England).

Colston supported and endowed schools and other public institutions in Bristol, London and elsewhere. His name was widely commemorated in Bristol landmarks, and a statue of him was erected in 1895.

With growing awareness and disapproval in the late 20th century of his involvement in Britain's slave trade, there were protests and petitions for landmarks named after him to be renamed, culminating in June 2020, when his statue was toppled and pushed into Bristol Harbour during protests in support of Black Lives Matter. The city's concert venue, Colston Hall, was renamed Bristol Beacon along with several other locations that held his name.

== Early life ==
Colston was born on 2 November 1636, in Temple Street, Bristol, and baptised in the Temple Church, Bristol. His parents were William Colston, a prosperous Royalist merchant who was High Sheriff of Bristol in 1643, and his wife Sarah Batten, daughter of Edward Batten; he was the eldest of at least 11 and possibly as many as 15 children. The Colston family had lived in the city since the late 13th century. Colston was brought up in Bristol until the time of the English Civil War, when he probably lived for a while on his father's estate in Winterbourne, just north of the city. The family then moved to London, and Colston was educated at the Christ's Hospital school. The English Civil War shaped Colston's lifelong support for order and stability in the form of monarchy and High Anglicanism.

== Career ==
In 1654, Colston was apprenticed to the Mercers Company for eight years, and in 1673 he was enrolled into it. By 1672, he had become a merchant in London. Like his father, Colston exported textiles from London while importing oils, wine and sherry from Spain and Portugal. He also traded silk with Virginia and was a regular trader of cod from Newfoundland to Naples. He had built up a successful business trading with Spain, Portugal, Italy and Africa. He also made money from money lending.

In 1680, Colston became a member of the Royal African Company, which had held the monopoly in England on trading along the west coast of Africa in gold, silver, ivory and slaves from 1662. Colston was on the board of directors from 1681 to 1683, 1686 to 1688, and 1691, and was deputy governor of the company from 1689 to 1690. His association with the company ended in 1692. The company was established by King Charles II, together with his brother the Duke of York (later King James II) as the governor of the company, City of London merchants and other investors.

The Colstons were pioneers of the British slave trade and Colston's record of office holding suggests heavy involvement in it. During his time with the Royal African Company from 1680 to 1692, it is estimated that the company transported over 84,000 African men, women and children to the Caribbean and the rest of the Americas, of whom as many as 19,000 may have died on the journey - a number of people roughly equivalent to the size of Bristol's population at the time. The slaves were sold for labour on tobacco, and (increasingly) sugar plantations. Colston's dividends from the Royal African Company amounted to the equivalent of more than £5 million today.

Colston was also a commissioner for, and investor in, the South Sea Company, which supplied slaves to Spanish America, using the Royal African Company to do so. Colston was one of the few people to have got his money out of South Sea Company stock before it crashed, with historians Richard Stone and Steve Cushion suggesting he did so through insider trading.

In 1681 he probably began to take an active interest in the affairs of Bristol, where about this time he embarked in a sugar refinery. In 1682, he made a loan of £1,800 to the Bristol Corporation and the following year, became a member of the Society of Merchant Venturers. By 1685 he appears as the city's creditor for about £2,000.

Although a Tory High Churchman and often in conflict with the Whig corporation of Bristol, Colston transferred a large segment of his original shareholding to William III at the beginning of 1689, securing the new regime's favour for the African Company. The value of Colston's shares increased and being without heirs he began to donate large sums to charities (see below).

Colston used his money and power to promote order in the form of High Anglicanism in the Church of England and oppose Anglican Latitudinarians, Roman Catholics, and dissenter Protestants. He withdrew from the African Company in 1692, but continued working on his private businesses and with the South Sea Company – including in the slave trade – until he retired in 1708. Colston was then an MP for Bristol from 1710 to 1713. He took little active part in Parliament and did not seek re-election. As an MP, he lobbied for the government to increase its involvement in the slave trade. He was a board member of the High Tory Loyal Brotherhood.

== Philanthropic works ==
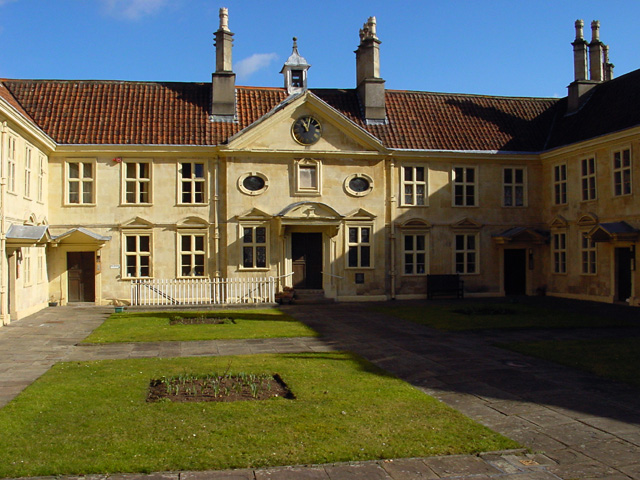
Colston's Almshouses

Colston supported and endowed schools, houses for the poor, almshouses, hospitals and Anglican churches in Bristol, London and elsewhere. His name features widely on Bristol buildings and landmarks. Compared to other Bristolians, Colston's philanthropic giving was small and austere.

In 1681, the date of his father's death, he appears as a governor of Christ's Hospital, to which he afterwards gave frequently. During the remainder of his life he seems to have divided his attention equally between the city of his birth and that of his adoption.

In 1691, on St Michael's Hill, Bristol, at a cost of £8,000 (equivalent to $1,700,000 in 2025), he founded Colstons Almshouses for the reception of 24 poor men and women, and endowed with accommodation for "Six Saylors", at a cost of £600, the merchant's almshouses in King Street. He also endowed Queen Elizabeth's Hospital school. In 1696, at a cost of £8,000, he endowed a foundation for clothing and teaching 40 boys (the books employed were to have in them "no tincture of Whiggism"); and six years afterwards he expended a further sum of £1,500 in rebuilding the schoolhouse. In 1708, at a cost of £41,200 (equivalent to $8,000,000 in 2025), he built and endowed his great foundation on Saint Augustine’s Back, for the instruction, clothing, maintaining and apprenticing of 100 boys; and in time of scarcity, during this and next year, he transmitted some £20,000 (equivalent to $3,100,000 in 2025) to the London committee, to be managed by the Society of Merchant Venturers for its upkeep. He gave money to schools in Temple (one of which went on to become St Mary Redcliffe and Temple School) and other parts of Bristol, and to several churches and the cathedral.

His philanthropic giving often had restrictive criteria for use. From his charitable giving he excluded, for instance, Catholics, Jews, dissenters and people who were not Tories. Through these conditions, Colston sought to shape society. Historian Sally Morgan argues Colston's intention with the alms-housing and gifts to schools, far from being philanthropic, was to train a small number of boys whom he expected to work for him, and to persuade aging sailors to continue working for him with the hope of accommodation.

== Death ==
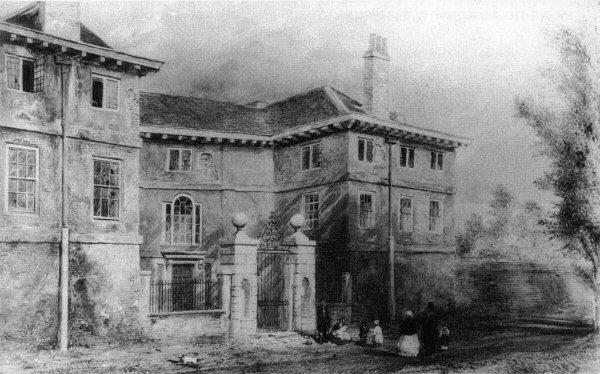
Cromwell House, Mortlake, west London, where Colston died in 1721. He was buried in Bristol.

Colston died of old age on 11 October 1721, aged 84, at his home, Cromwell House (demolished 1857), in Mortlake, south west London, where he had lived since about 1689. His will stated that he wished to be buried simply without pomp, but this instruction was ignored. His body was carried to Bristol and was buried at All Saints' Church. His monument was designed by James Gibbs, with an effigy carved by John Michael Rysbrack. The stone panels behind the tomb provide a long list of the various charities he funded, totalling £40,745.

Colston never married, and settled a "considerable fortune in land" on his nephew Edward Colston (MP for Wells), when Edward married in 1704.

== Memorials ==
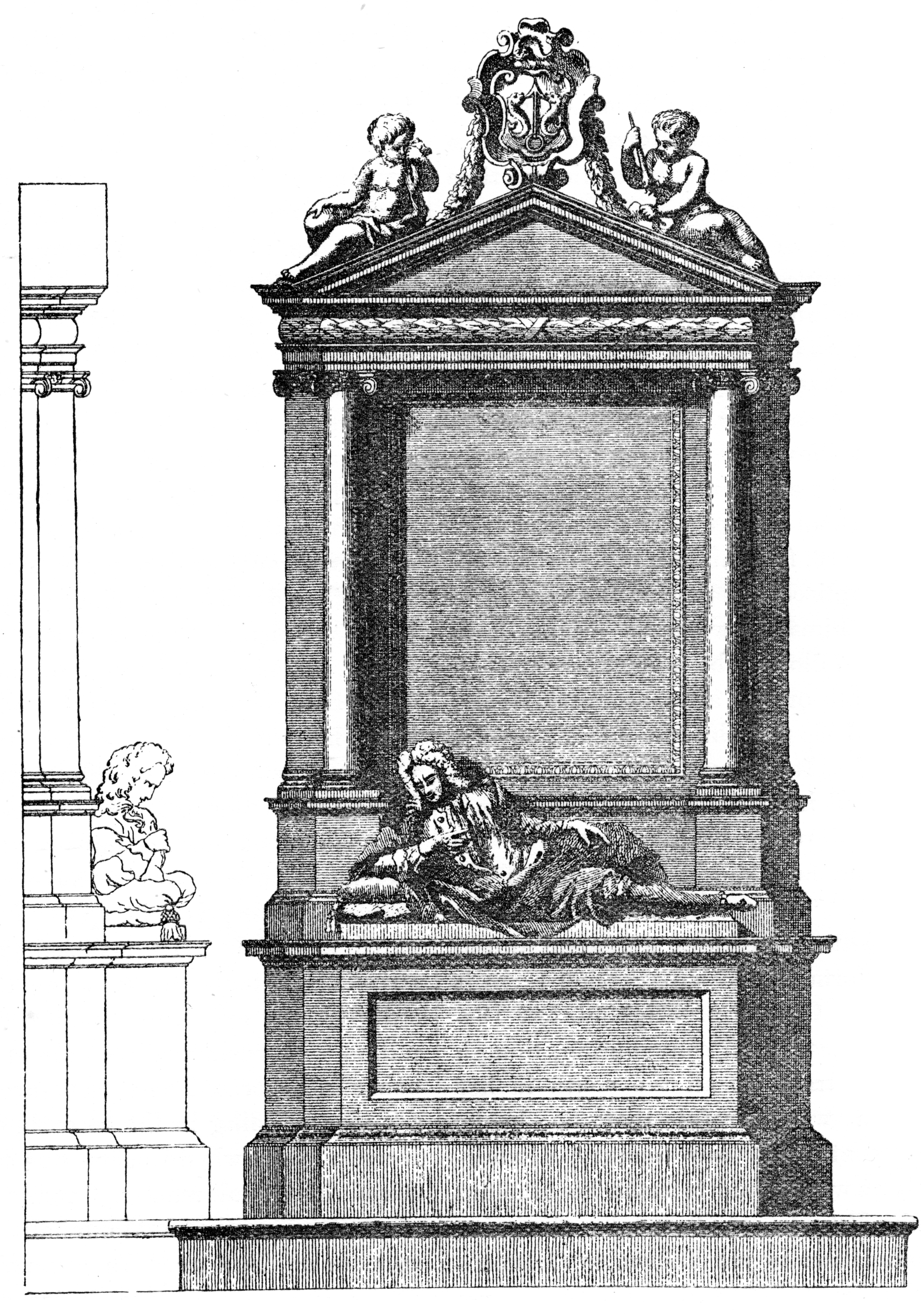
Engraving of Colston's monument in All Saints' Church, Bristol from Bristol Past and Present (1882)

Buildings in Bristol formerly named in memory of Colston included the Colston Tower and Colston Hall (now Beacon Tower and Bristol Beacon, respectively). Colston Avenue and Colston Street are named after him, as is a regional bread bun, the Colston bun. A statue of Colston is on the exterior of Bristol Guildhall, built 1843–1846. There was an 1870 stained-glass window of the Good Samaritan by Clayton and Bell dedicated to Colston's memory in the north transept of St Mary Redcliffe, which was removed in June 2020, following the toppling of his outdoor statue. The largest window in Bristol Cathedral is also dedicated to Colston's memory; the Bishop of Bristol announced in June 2020 that the Anglican Diocese of Bristol would remove prominent references to Colston from the window.

The Colston Society, which had operated for 275 years commemorating Colston, latterly as a charity, decided to disband in 2020.

=== City-centre memorial statue ===
In 1895, 174 years after Colston's death, a statue designed by John Cassidy was erected in the centre of Bristol, to commemorate Colston's philanthropy. Colston's slave-trading activities were subsequently uncovered in a biography of his life and work written by H.J. Wilkins in 1920, and from the 1990s onwards, there were growing calls for the statue to be marked with a plaque stating that he was a slave trader, or taken down.

In July 2018, Bristol City Council, which was responsible for the statue, made a planning application to add a second plaque which would "add to the public knowledge about Colston" including his philanthropy and his involvement in slave trading, though the initial wording suggested came in for significant criticism from members of the public and a Bristol Conservative councillor, with the result being that the plaque was reworded. This wording was edited by a former curator at the Bristol Museum and Art Gallery, creating a third proposal which was backed by other members of the public, though it was criticised by the academic behind the first two versions, who claimed it "sanitised" history, minimising Colston's role, omitting the number of child slaves, and focussing on West Africans as the original enslavers. Nevertheless, a wording was subsequently agreed upon and the bronze plaque was cast. After the plaque was physically produced, its installation was vetoed in March 2019 by the Mayor of Bristol, Marvin Rees, who criticised the Society of Merchant Venturers for the rewording. A statement from the mayor's office called it "unacceptable", claimed that Rees had not been consulted, and promised to continue work on a second plaque.

His Victorian era statue was toppled and pushed into Bristol Harbour by demonstrators during the George Floyd protests on 7 June 2020. One protester was shown kneeling on the statue's neck, referencing the manner in which Floyd died. The statue was retrieved from the harbour four days later by Bristol City Council, and taken to a secure location. After the statue was toppled, the Merchant Venturers said that it had been "inappropriate" for them to have become involved in the rewording of the plaque in 2018, and that the removal of the statue was "right for Bristol".

From 4 June 2021, the statue was put on display in its damaged condition by Bristol's M Shed museum, which stated "this temporary display is the start of a conversation, not a complete exhibition".

A new plaque, with no mention of Colston as a "city benefactor", was installed on the empty plinth on 17 April 2025.

== Modern reappraisal ==
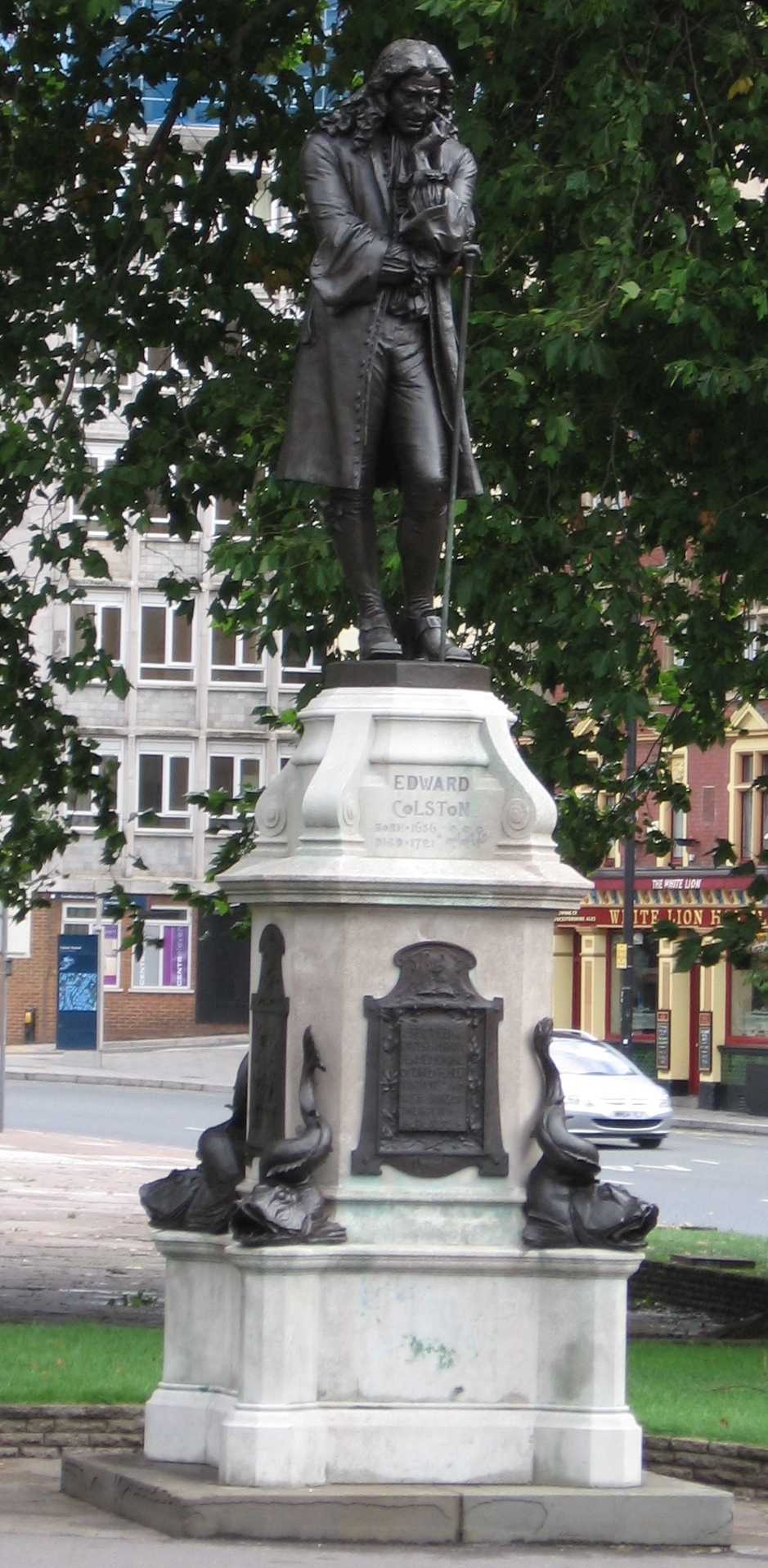
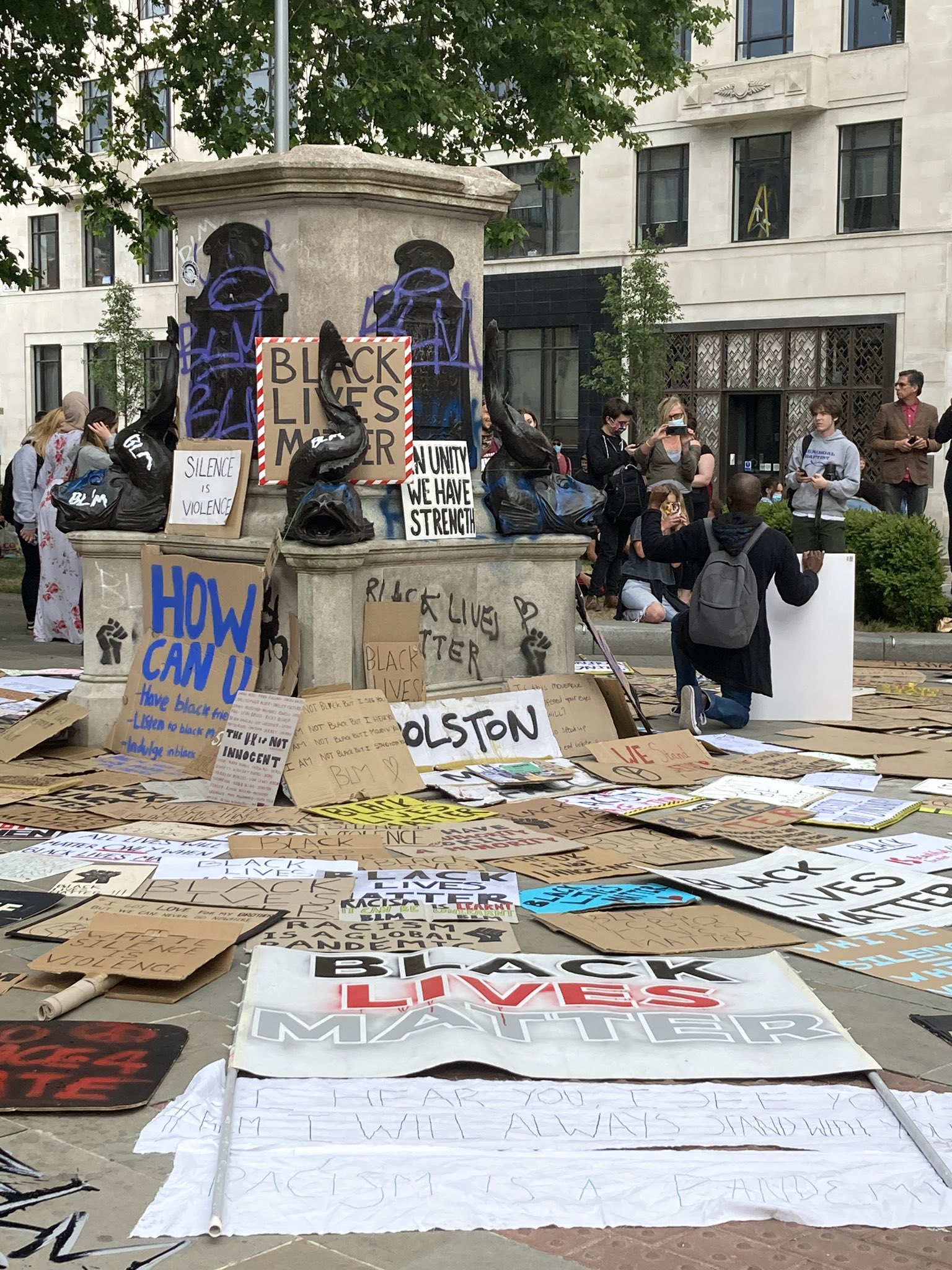
Statue of Edward Colston by John Cassidy, formerly in The Centre, Bristol, erected in 1895, toppled in 2020 (left) and the empty pedestal on 7 June 2020 (right)

Accounts of Colston written in the nineteenth century were extremely positive, lauding him for his philanthropy and for his 'nobleness' of his spirit. According to historian Richard Stone, much of what Victorians said of Colston was imaginary, a "creation of this idealised saint figure". In the opening sentences to Thomas Garrard's 1852 biography, the author cited Pliny the Elder:

It is the especial duty of an Historian, says Pliny, "not to allow the memory of those men to sink into oblivion who have by their deeds merited an immortality of fame." That immortality has seldom been awarded to the lot of a nobler Philanthropist than Edward Colston.

The first critical biography was that by Rev. Henry J. Wilkins in 1920, his being the first account to demonstrate that Colston was a slave trader. Wilkins was also critical of Colston's extreme antipathy to nonconformists. In highlighting these defects, Wilkins suggested that "we cannot picture him justly except against his historical background". Colston's involvement in the slave trade predated the abolition movement in Britain, and was during the time when "slavery was generally condoned in England—indeed, throughout Europe—by churchmen, intellectuals and the educated classes". Wilkins' criticisms prompted a strong reaction from many in interwar Bristol who wanted to defend Colston's legacy, which was by this time commemorated annually in the Colston Day celebrations. In 1925 Wilkins provided a further supplementary account of Colston's life with additional evidence of Colston's failings. Noting evidence of his unscrupulousness in his business dealings, as well as charges of personal immorality, Wilkins proposed that:

I have urged (having regard to the unhistorical and ill-proportioned position Bristol has given to Edward Colston through the absence of documentary evidence and political partisanship with its charitable efforts) that Bristol should free herself from such a position, recall her heritage and rise to a true "Commemoration" on November 13th in each year of the noble galaxy of benefactors and worthies of "The Metropolis of the West."

Since at least the 1990s, with increasing recognition of Colston's role in the slave trade, there has been growing criticism of his commemoration. In 1996, Bristol band Massive Attack boycotted what was then Colston Hall over its association with the slave trader and, in 2007, people protested outside the venue due to its use as a venue hosting events celebrating the bicentenary of the abolition of the slave trade. The Dolphin Society, which was formed to continue Colston's philanthropy, as of 2015 referred to "the evils of slavery" and recognised that "black citizens in Bristol today can suffer disadvantage in terms of education, employment and housing for reasons that connect back to the days of the trans-Atlantic slave trade".

In April 2017 the Bristol Music Trust, a charity that ran the "Colston Hall", announced that it would drop the name of Colston after a 2020 refurbishment. There had been protests and petitions calling for a name change, and some concertgoers and artists had boycotted the venue because of the Colston name. Following the decision almost 10,000 people signed petitions to retain the name of Colston, but the hall was renamed as the Bristol Beacon in September 2020 after three years of consultation. However after debate it was decided in 2023 that street names in Bristol bearing the name ‘Colston’ would remain, this included the road that the former Colston Hall now Bristol Beacon is situated which is Colston Street and the neighbouring Colston Avenue.

In November 2017, the Colston's Girls' School, funded by the Society of Merchant Venturers, initially announced that it would not drop the name of Colston, because it was of "no benefit" to the school to do so. After later consultations in 2020 with staff and pupils the school changed its name to Montpelier High School.

In April 2018, the Lord Mayor of Bristol ordered that a portrait of Colston be removed from her office, saying that she would not "be comfortable sharing it with the portrait", planning that the portrait would later be hung in the proposed Museum of Abolition.

In summer 2018, Colston Primary School renamed itself Cotham Gardens Primary School after consultation with pupils and parents. In February 2019, St Mary Redcliffe and Temple School announced that it would rename its former Colston house after the American mathematician Katherine Johnson.

In June 2020, the pub formerly known as the Colston Arms temporarily changed its name to Ye Olde Pubby McDrunkface (a reference to the name for a research vessel voted for by the public in 2016), inviting suggestions from the public for a new name; in December 2021 the pub was renamed the Open Arms.

In 2020, at the sight of the toppling of the Edward Colston statue in Bristol, a member of the organisational team for the event "was adamant that Colston's charitable deeds in no way made up for the transportation of thousands of Africans into slavery. 'The statue was glorifying the acts of a slave trader. He gave some money to schools and good causes but it was blood money', she said".

Stained glass windows celebrating Colston have been removed at St Mary Redcliffe church and Bristol Cathedral.

== See also ==
- Anchor Society – Bristol charity
- Bristol slave trade – Slavery in southwestern England

== Biographical works ==
- Ball, R. (2017). 'The Royal African Company and Edward Colston (1680–92)’. Bristol: Bristol Radical History Group. Research Paper, No. 2.
- Garrard, Thomas (1852). Edward Colston, the philanthropist, his life and times; including a Memoir of his father; the result of a laborious investigation into the archives of the city. Bristol: J. Chilcott
- Hayton, D., Cruickshanks, E., Handley, S., eds. (2002). 'COLSTON, Edward II (1636-1721), of Mortlake, Surr.' The History of Parliament Online. London: History of Parliament Trust
- Marshall, Emma (1884). In Colston's Days: A Story of Old Bristol. London: Seeley, Jackson & Halliday.
- Morgan, Kenneth (1999). Edward Colston and Bristol. Bristol: Bristol Historical Association.
- Morgan, Kenneth (2021). 'Colston, Edward (1636–1721), merchant, slave trader, and philanthropist', Oxford Dictionary of National Biography. Oxford University Press. doi-org.bris.idm.oclc.org/10.1093/ref:odnb/5996
- Tovey, S. G. (1863). Colston the Philanthropist: Memorials of his Life and Deeds. Bristol: T. D. Taylor
- Wilkins, H. J. (1920). Edward Colston [1636-1721 A.D.]: A chronological account of his life and work. Bristol: Arrowsmith
- Wilkins, H. J. (1925). Edward Colston [1636-1721 A.D.]: Supplement to a Chronological Account of his Life and Work. Bristol: Arrowsmith
- Wroughton, John (2002). Mr Colston's Hospital : The History of Colston's School, Bristol, 1710-2002. Chapter 1. Bristol. Society of Merchant Venturers
