= Kodlunarn Island =

Island in Frobisher Bay, Nunavut

Native name: Qallunaaq (White Man's Island)
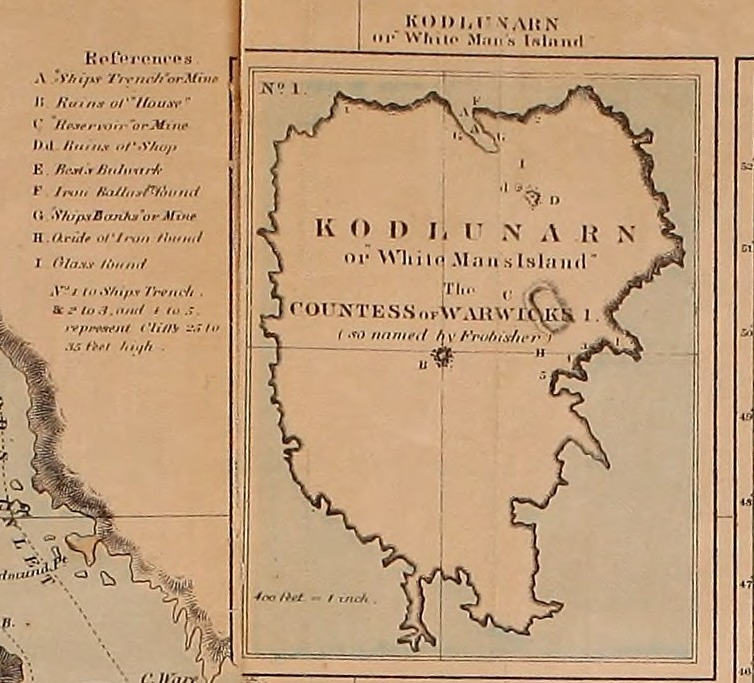
- 1865 map of Kodlunarn Island by Charles Francis Hall, noting major archaeological features

- Location within Nunavut Location within Canada

Geography
- Location: Northern Canada
- Coordinates: 62°49′N 65°25′W
- Archipelago: Arctic Archipelago
- Area: 7 ha (17 acres)

Administration
- Canada
- Territory: Nunavut

Additional information
- National Historic Site of Canada Designated 1964

Kodlunarn Island, known as Qallunaaq (Note: Also rendered as "Qallunaat" or "Qallunaan"; not to be confused with Qallunaat Island in Greenland.) (White Man's Island) in Inuktitut and originally named Countess of Warwick Island, is a small island located in Frobisher Bay in the Canadian territory of Nunavut. During the 1570s, explorer Martin Frobisher led expeditions to the island to mine what he believed was gold ore. The ore turned out to be worthless, and the island was ignored by explorers until Charles Francis Hall, inspired by oral history accounts from the Inuit of Frobisher Bay, visited the site in 1861 to investigate the remains of Frobisher's expeditions. Notable features of the island include two large mining trenches and the remains of a stone house built by Frobisher in 1578. Kodlunarn Island was designated a National Historic Site of Canada in 1964.

== History ==
In 1576, English explorer Martin Frobisher set out to the Canadian Arctic in search of the Northwest Passage, landing in what is now known as Frobisher Bay. Here, Frobisher was attacked by Inuit, but survived; five crew members, however, went out to explore the land and never returned. A strange black rock was discovered on a small island in the bay, which, according to an account from Frobisher's financier, Michael Lok, was named "hawlls Illand" [sic] after shipmaster Christopher Hall. On Frobisher's return to England, Lok eventually had the rock assessed as gold ore, after numerous other assessments had concluded that it was worthless. An Inuk man was also captured on this voyage and brought back to England; he died shortly after arriving there.

Spurred on by the supposed discovery of gold ore, the Cathay Company was established to fund further missions to the Arctic, and Frobisher and his crew returned to the area the next year, this time with the goal of mining gold (and a secondary goal of finding the five lost men). Large deposits of black ore were discovered on what Frobisher dubbed "Countess of Warwick Island", and he set up a mining camp there. The search for the crew members proved fruitless, and after finding evidence that they had been killed, the Englishmen launched attacks on Inuit camps. A fort was built on Kodlunarn to defend against Inuit retaliation. 158 tons of ore were transported back to England from this voyage, along with three more Inuit captives (a man named Kalicho by the English, a woman named Arnaq, and Arnaq's son) who died soon after their arrival.

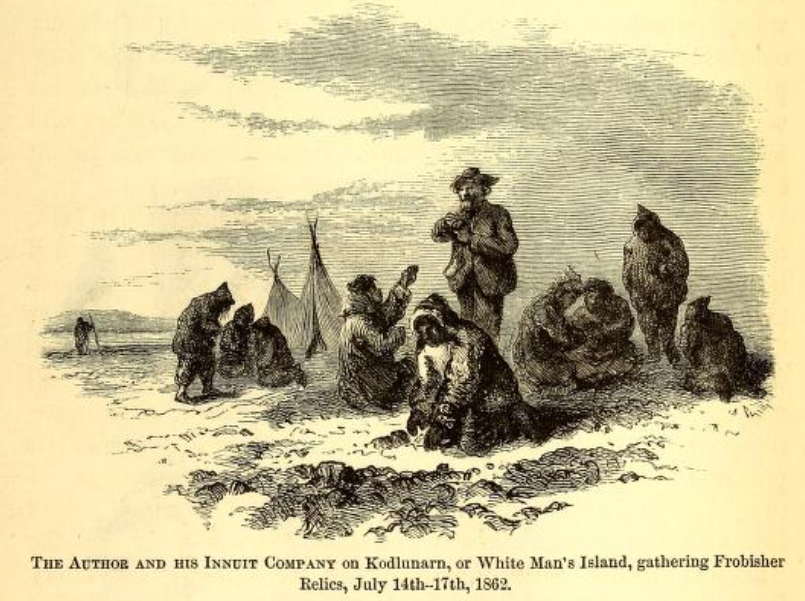
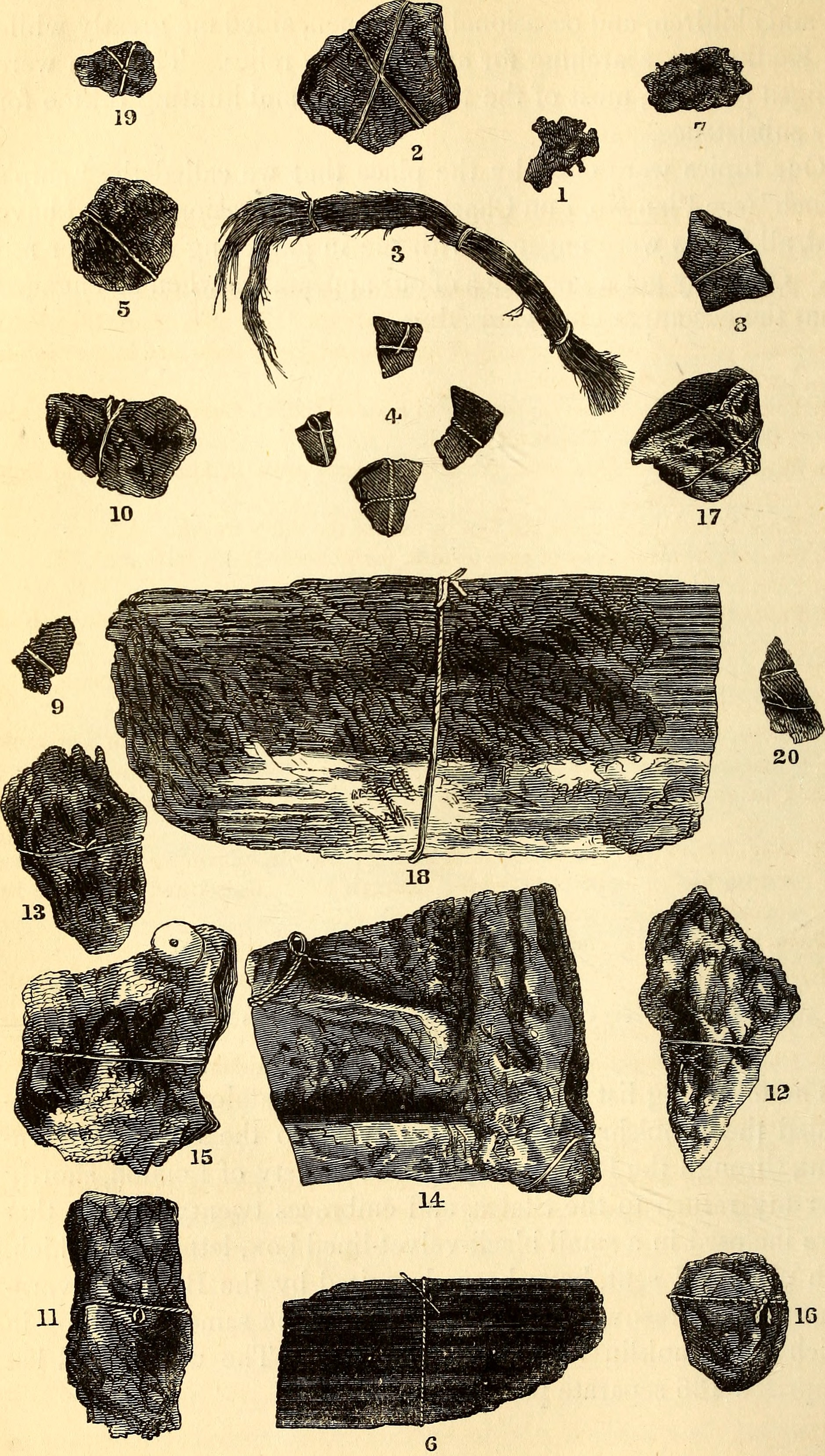
Left: Illustration from Hall's Arctic researches, and life among the Esquimaux (1865), showing Hall and several Inuit collecting artifacts on Kodlunarn Island. Right: Illustration of some artifacts that Hall collected from Kodlunarn, including pottery and tile shards, glass fragments and flint stones.

A second expedition to the Arctic took place in 1578. This much larger expedition, comprising 15 vessels, aimed to mine at least 800 tons of ore and establish a mining colony of 100 men on Kodlunarn. The voyage was difficult and large quantities of materials were lost on the way. It proved impossible to establish a colony on the island, but a small stone house was built and some materials were buried to prepare for an eventual return. In an attempt to improve relations with the Inuit, Frobisher left gifts for them in the house before his departure. After a troubled return to England, with 1136 tons of black ore in tow, it was discovered that the assessment of the ore was incorrect and the expeditions had been a complete waste of finances. The Cathay Company was bankrupted, and Frobisher and his men would not return to Kodlunarn. The island apparently remained unknown to European explorers for the next several centuries.

In 1861, Charles Francis Hall, having travelled to the Arctic in search of the survivors of Sir John Franklin's lost expedition, was informed by local Inuit about historic European exploration of the Frobisher Bay area. Accompanied by Inuit guides, he visited Kodlunarn Island to investigate the remains of the expeditions. Based on interviews with Inuit Elders, for which he devised a comprehensive questionnaire, and artifacts and structures discovered on the island, Hall concluded that Kodlunarn had been one of the sites of Frobisher's mining voyages. Hall sent some artifacts of the Frobisher voyages to museums, but few survive today.

Further small-scale expeditions were led by archaeologists from the Field Museum in 1927, the Royal Ontario Museum in 1974, and the Smithsonian Institution in 1981. The island was designated a National Historic Site of Canada in 1964 for its role in Frobisher's voyages and its significance in Inuit oral history. In 1990 the Canadian Museum of Civilization organized an expedition to Kodlunarn, leading to the establishment of the Meta Incognita Project the next year, whose goal is to support research and conservation of the island and other sites associated with Frobisher's Arctic exploration.

== Geography and archaeology ==
Kodlunarn Island is located near the northeastern shore of Frobisher Bay and lies 190 km (120 mi) from Iqaluit, the capital city of Nunavut. The island, which measures about 7 ha (0.070 km^{2}; 17 acres) in area, (Note: The figure of 7 ha (0.070 km^{2}; 17 acres) refers to the island surface; if the foreshore is included, the total area is about 9 ha (0.090 km^{2}; 22 acres).) is largely surrounded by vertical cliffs, and its terrain consists primarily of barren rock and gravel. For most of the year it is virtually devoid of water.

A long trench leading to the island surface is dug into the cliff face on the north shore. Hall named this feature the "ship's trench" because Inuit oral history accounts stated that it had been used for boat launches and repairs. Archaeological evidence supports that it was used as a mine and was likely the first mining site on Kodlunarn; it also would have allowed explorers access to the island without having to scale cliffs. Another large mining trench, which Hall labelled the "mine/reservoir trench" (though it probably was not dug for the latter purpose), is found inland, about 100 m (330 ft) to the southeast. The "black ore" deposits found at Frobisher's mining sites are principally composed of hornblende. An area containing evidence of industrial activity by Frobisher's mining parties is located east of the "mine/reservoir trench".

The ruins of the "Frobisher House" built during the 1578 expedition are situated near the centre of the island at its highest point of elevation. In 1990 all that remained of the above-ground structure was a small pit, with debris and rocks that previously formed the walls of the house scattered around its vicinity; the foundation is comparatively intact. There is archaeological evidence that Kodlunarn was used as a temporary camp site by the Inuit in the past, but it is unlikely that it was consistently inhabited.
