= English ship Aid (1562) =

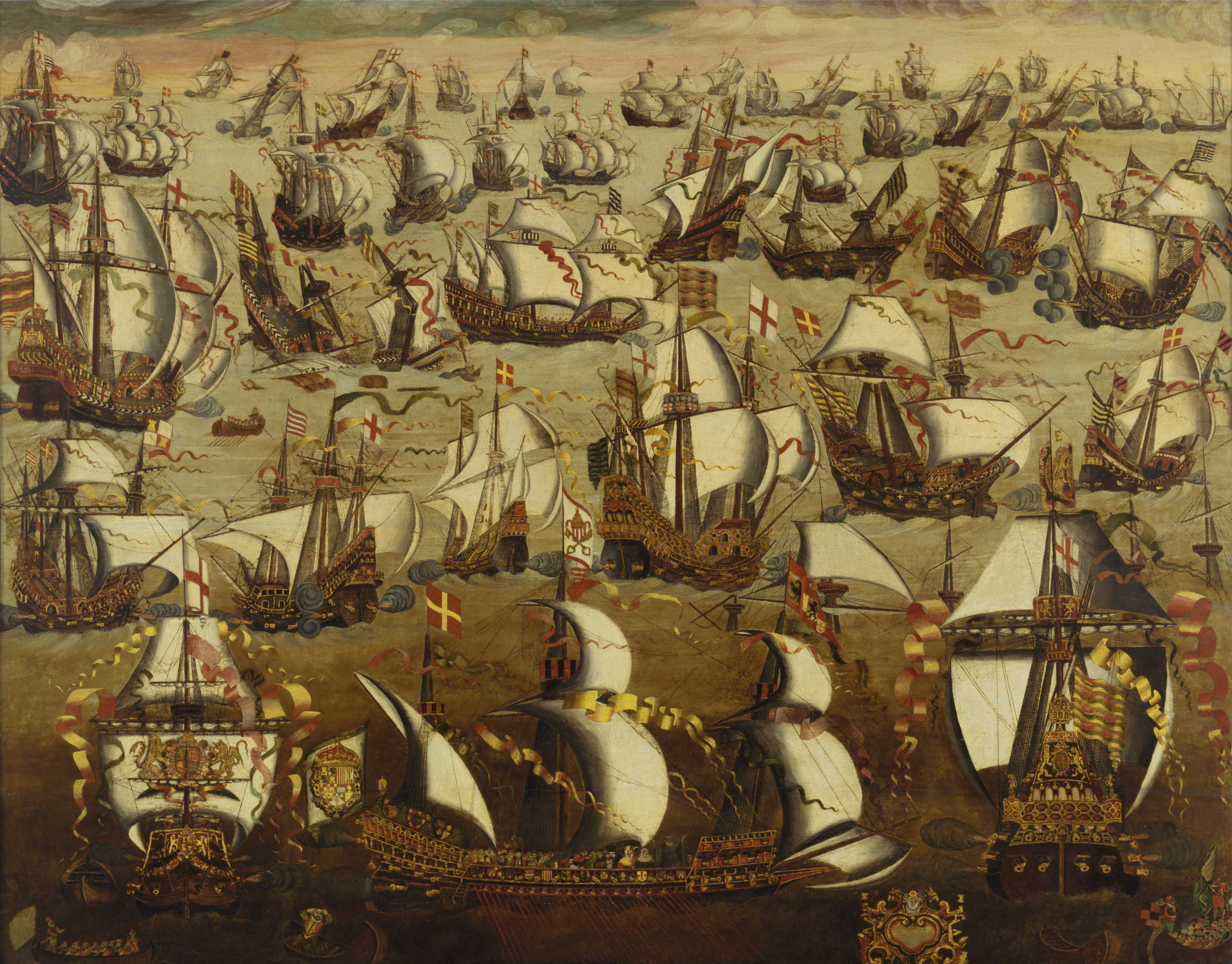
- English ships fight the Spanish Armada, 1588

History

England
- Name: Aid or Ayde
- Builder: Deptford Dockyard
- Launched: 6 October 1562
- Fate: Broken up in 1599
- Notes: Participated in: Chaseabout Raid; Spanish Armada

General characteristics
- Type: Armed ship
- Tons burthen: 300 burthen
- Armament: 18 guns; 8 × 9-pounders; 2 × 6-pounders; 4 × 4-pounders; 4 small guns

Aid or Ayde (Note: The 'HMS' prefix was not used until the middle of the 18th century, but is sometimes applied retrospectively) was an 18-gun ship of the Royal Navy. She was built at Deptford Dockyard, being launched on 6 October 1562. She was rebuilt in 1580 and was broken up in 1599. For the majority of her service, she was commanded by Sir Martin Frobisher.

== Service history ==
=== Le Havre (1562) ===
Aid was one of three ships built in 1562 due to the threat of war with France. Her first duty, in autumn of that year, was to help supply the English garrison at Le Havre. This continued until the port was captured by French loyalist forces from the Huguenots in August the following year.

=== Service off the coast of Scotland (1565) ===
Anthony Jenkinson was sent in Aid to Scotland during the political crisis of the Chaseabout Raid. He sailed into the Firth of Forth on 25 September 1565. Jenkinson had intended to blockade Leith to prevent Lord Seton bringing munitions for Mary, Queen of Scots from France. He was instructed not to declare that he had been sent by the English government. He was also supposed to link up with Agnes Keith, Countess of Moray in Wilson's ship, but did not get the orders in time. An adverse wind brought him within range of the cannon of the fortress isle of Inchkeith and he returned to Berwick-upon-Tweed. Jenkinson's failure resulted in a dispute with the Earl of Bedford who was England's leading diplomat in Scottish affairs.

=== Expedition to the Northwest Passage (1577) ===
The ship's next major duty was in 1577, when the ship was granted to Martin Frobisher as part of his second expedition what is now the far north islands of Canada. The expedition was made up of Aid, commanded by Frobisher, and two barks, Gabriel and Michael, commanded by Edward Fenton and Gilbert Yorke respectively. The fleet, consisting over about 120 men, departed Harwich on 31 May 1577. The expedition brought back 200 tons of ore, although the value of this was less than Frobisher's investors had hoped. They also kidnapped three Inuit, a male, Kalicho, an unrelated female Arnaq and her child, Nutaaq (all names were given to them by the kidnappers). All three died within a month of arriving in England.

=== Second expedition to the Northwest Passage (1578) ===
Another voyage ensued, with Frobisher this time taking some fifteen vessels to explore the Northwest Passage, mine ore and establish a manned settlement in the area. The journey was tough, with strong winds and thick ice preventing them from travelling beyond the Hudson Strait, and they returned to Frobisher Bay. There, Aid was hulled below the waterline by an ice floe, requiring repair by a sheet of lead. They abandoned plans to establish a settlement in the area and returned to England with over 1,000 tons of ore.

=== Anglo-Spanish War (1580s) ===
Aid was rebuilt in 1580 as relations with the Spanish deteriorated. Under the command of Frobisher, Aid was involved in the Siege of Smerwick, as part of the English fleet sent to remove a combined Spanish-Papal force taking refuge at Dún an Óir. Remaining under Frobisher's command, Aid was one of two ships contributed by Queen Elizabeth I to Sir Francis Drake's expedition to the Spanish West Indies in 1585. She was later part of Drake's fleet at Plymouth to meet the Spanish Armada, remaining with the fleet from the arrival of the Armada on 31 July until the defeat of the Spanish at the Battle of Gravelines, eight days later. Aid was also involved in the ill-fated Counter Armada the following year.

== Bibliography ==
- Colledge, J. J.; Warlow, Ben (2006) [1969]. Ships of the Royal Navy: The Complete Record of All Fighting Ships of the Royal Navy from the 15th Century to the Present (3rd Rev ed.). London: Chatham Publishing. ISBN 978-1-86176-281-8. OCLC 67375475.
- Paine, Lincoln P (2000). Ships of Discovery and Exploration (2000 ed.). Houghton Mifflin. ISBN 0-395-98415-7.
