= Edward Dodding =

English physician

Dr Edward Dodding MD FRCP
- Born: c. 1540; Westmorland, England
- Died: April 1592 (aged 51–52)
- Education: Trinity College, Cambridge
- Years active: 1572–1592
- Known for: Post-mortem of Kalicho
- Medical career
- Profession: Physician

Edward Dodding (c. 1540 – April 1592) was an English physician who completed the post-mortem examination of Kalicho, one of three Inuit who died soon after they were brought to England by Martin Frobisher in 1577. His post-mortem notes on Kalicho are unusually detailed for their time and provide insights into contemporary medical knowledge and the attitudes of the English towards indigenous people.

== Early life ==
Dodding was born around 1540 in the historic county of Westmorland, England. He was educated at Trinity College, University of Cambridge, of which he became a fellow, and was awarded his BA in 1562 or 1563 and his MA in 1566.

== Career ==
Dodding was granted a licence to practise physic by the University of Cambridge in 1573, and was created M.D. in 1576. In the following year he appears to have been in practice at Bristol. He was admitted a fellow of the College of Physicians on 25 June 1584 and practiced medicine until his death in 1592.

== Kalicho, Arnaq, and Nutaaq ==
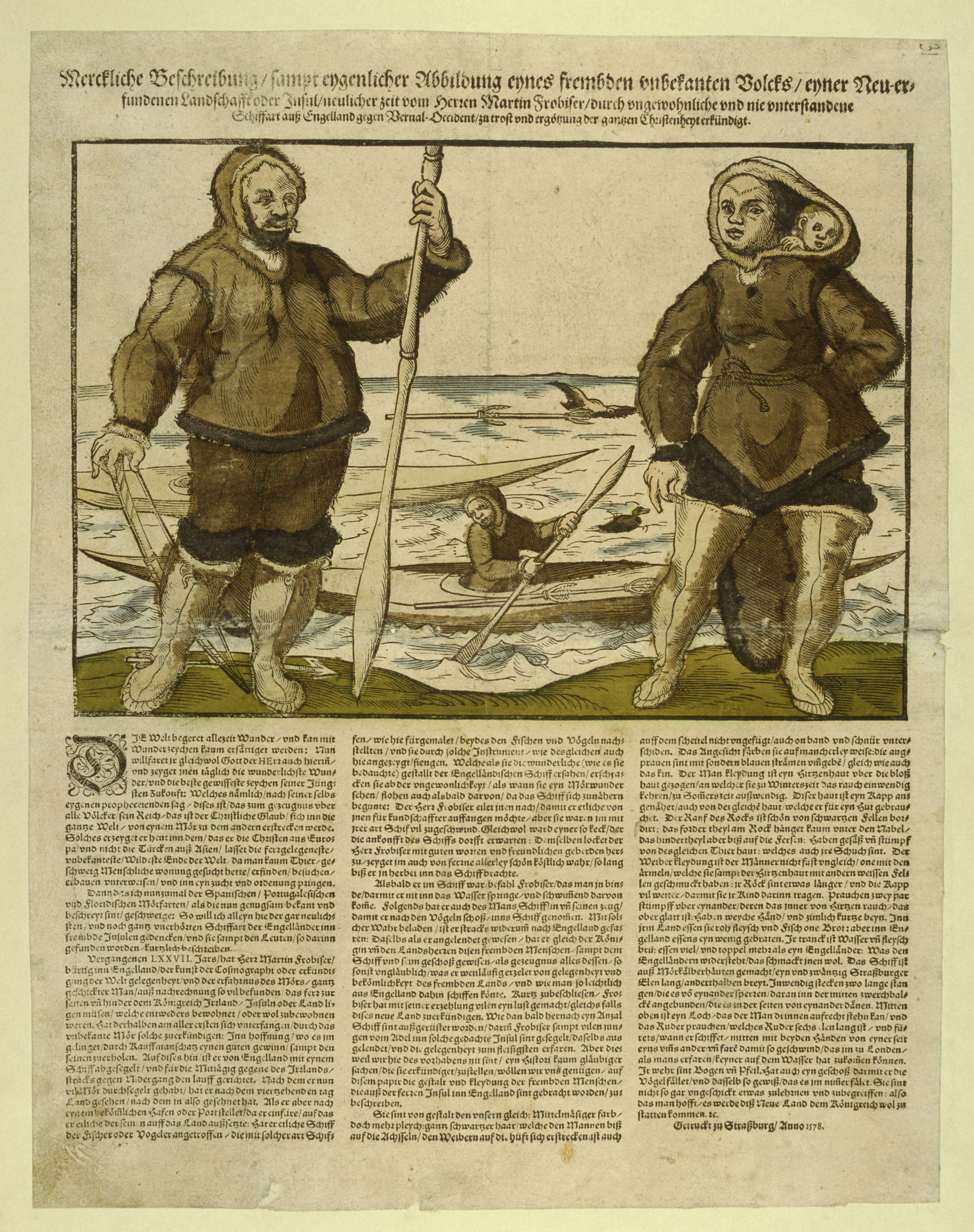
An anonymous 1578 illustration believed to show Kalicho (left), and Arnaq and Nutaaq (right)

Martin Frobisher took three Inuit native Americans to England in 1577 after his second expedition to find the North West passage, a man, Kalicho, a woman, Arnaq, and Arnaq's son Nutaaq. All died soon after their arrival in Bristol in October 1577. Kalicho and Arnaq may not have known each other before they were captured by Frobisher and the names used for them in England may not have been their real Inuit names.

After Kalicho became unwell, Dodding initially advised bloodletting in order to quench "the fire of the inflammation" but this was refused by Kalicho. In the last hour of Kalicho's life, Dodding observed that his speech, appetite and pulse all declined but near the end he began to talk fairly lucidly again and sang a song that had been heard when he was first removed from Baffin Island. His last words were a phrase that he had learned in England, "God be with you" and then, on 7 November 1577, about one month after his arrival in England, he died.

A post-mortem examination of Kalicho was performed by Dodding in Bristol on the day of Kalicho's death. He noted broken ribs which had not knitted together, lung injury and resulting putrefaction, all probably caused by the effects of Kalicho being thrown to the ground by a Cornish wrestler in the skirmish in which he was captured. His large stomach, as a consequence of being liberally fed, was attributed to "misguided kindness". Dodding also noted numerous indications of brain injury and in a departure from normal medical practice, commented on Kalicho's fear of the English which was hidden by his normally "cheerful features". The report, dated 8 November, described by Alden T. Vaughan as "unusually complete", was written in Latin and translated into English three times.

Dodding insisted that Arnaq watch Kalicho's burial at St Stephen's Church, Bristol, and she was shown recovered human bones to demonstrate to her that the English were not cannibals. Dodding was unsure how to interpret Arnaq's lack of reaction to Kalicho's body, attributing it to either extreme stoicism or simply indifference. Soon after, Arnaq too contracted a disease, probably measles, and died. On 12 November 1577, she was also buried at St Stephen's. A nurse was retained to take the infant Nutaaq to London to show to Queen Elizabeth but he died soon after arrival, probably also from measles, and before the Queen could see him.

Dodding's notes, which have been corroborated from paintings of the captives and contemporary accounts, provide insights into medical knowledge and practice in the sixteenth century and the attitudes of the English to indigenous people, but his personal attitude to the three captives is unclear. He was well trained and does not appear to have been cruel or callous but after Kalicho died, he expressed regret not at the man's death, but at the loss for the second time of the opportunity for Queen Elizabeth to see the captured people.

== Death ==
Dodding was buried at St Dunstan-in-the-West in Fleet Street, London, on 11 April 1592.
