= Arnaq =

Inuk woman

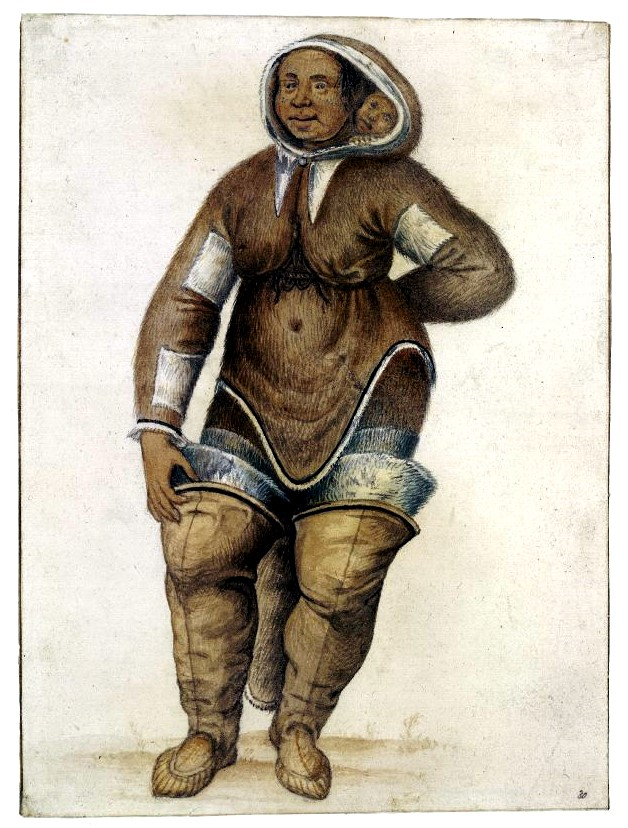
- Arnaq and her baby Nutaaq in a picture by John White
- Born: Unknown; North America
- Died: 1577; Bristol, England
- Cause of death: Measles
- Known for: being the first Inuk who travelled to England
- Children: Nutaaq

Notes
- Egnock

Arnaq or Egnock (died November 1577) was the name given by the English to an Inuk woman from what is now Baffin Island, Nunavut, who was taken hostage by Sir Martin Frobisher on his second journey to find the Northwest Passage. She, her infant son (named by the English as Nutaaq) and an Inuk man named as Kalicho were among the first Inuit and first indigenous people from North America to visit England and among the best documented of the Tudor period. They were brought back to the English port of Bristol at the end of September 1577 and died in November of the same year.

== Life ==
Arnaq was most likely born in the Frobisher Bay area of Nunavut in the 16th century. The name used for her by her captors is very similar to the Inuit word for "woman" (ᐊᕐᓇᖅ arnaq), so her real name is unknown.

She and her twelve-month old son, Nutaaq, were amongst four Inuit brought to England against their will by Frobisher. According to the 1578 account of George Best, who accompanied the 1577 expedition, Arnaq was captured with her son on 1 August on the Hall Peninsula near Kodlunarn Island (Countess of Warwick Island), where the English were mining for what they supposed to be gold ore. Captain York of the expedition had come across an abandoned Inuit settlement in which he found items of European clothing he assumed came from five members of Frobisher's 1576 expedition who had disappeared further up Frobisher Bay. Captain York sought to capture some of the local Inuit to serve as hostages that could be exchanged for the missing men. However, after a bloody fight in which five or six Inuit men were killed, they only succeeded in capturing an old woman (who they let go) and Arnaq with her baby. Arnaq was then brought back to the main expedition, where she was introduced to another captive Inuit, Kalicho, later that day. Attempts to arrange a hostage exchange failed and all three of the Inuit were brought back to England when the expedition returned home on 23 August. They arrived at the port of Bristol in England around the end of September.

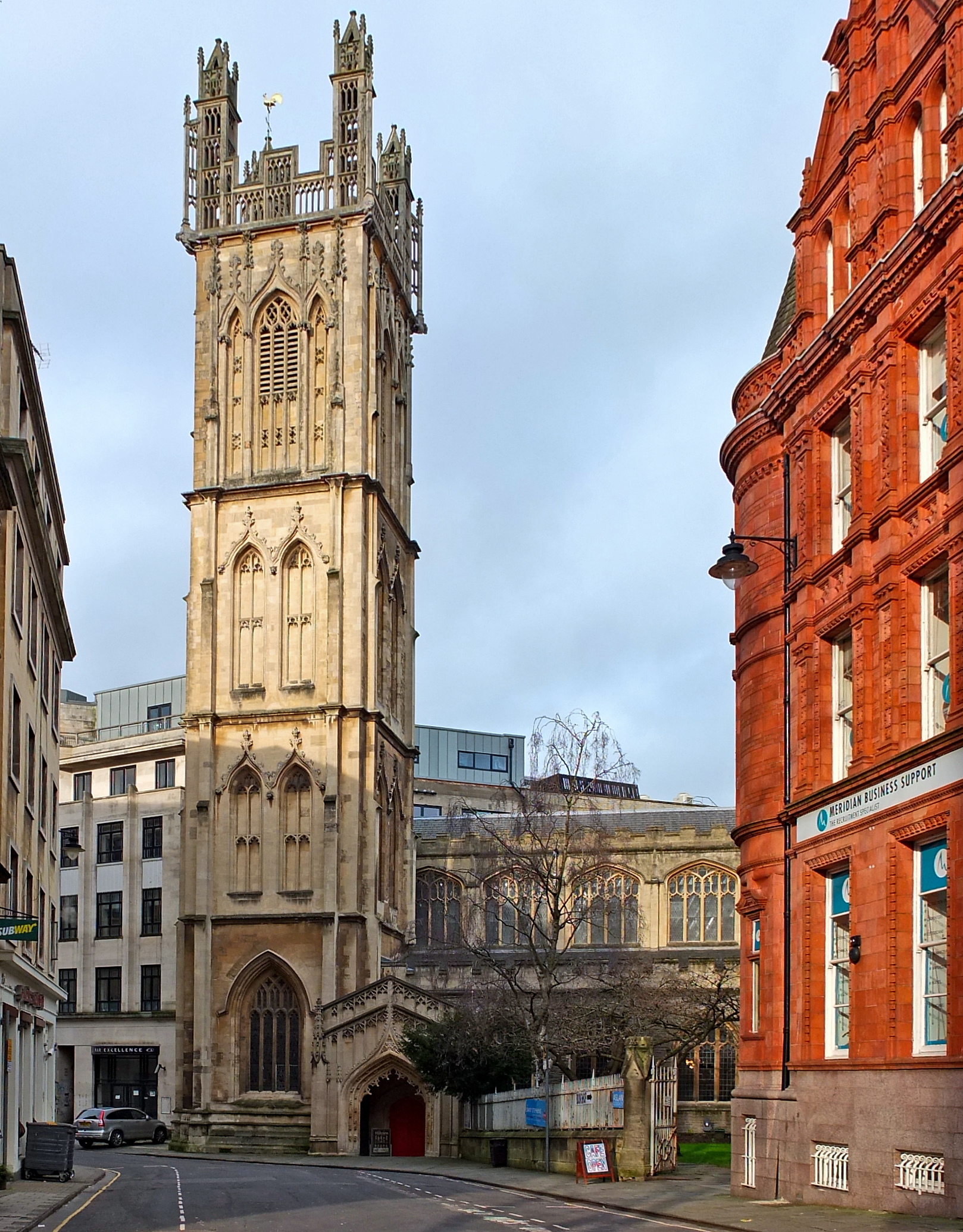
Arnaq was buried as a "heathen" in St Stephen's Church in Bristol

In England the three Inuit attracted considerable interest. Frobisher planned to present them to Queen Elizabeth and seems to have hoped that they might be taught English so that they could reveal more about their country and serve as interpreters on later expeditions. The family were taken to the mayor's house, Thomas Colston, and Kalicho performed numerous displays of his kayaking and hunting skills in Bristol harbour around 9 October. Four 'official' paintings were commissioned of Arnaq by Cornelis Ketel, a Flemish artist. Two of these paintings were later given to the Queen and were hung in Hampton Court Palace for many years. These paintings were later lost but paintings by the artist John White survived and were copied many times.

Kalicho died on 8 November, as a result of an infection stemming from broken ribs most likely sustained during his capture. After he had been given a post-mortem by Dr. Edward Dodding, Arnaq was obliged to witness his burial at St Stephen's Church in Bristol on 8 November 1577. Dodding commented on what he saw as her stoicism at Kalicho's fate. Dodding's motives for making Arnaq witness the funeral was because he wanted to ensure that Arnaq did not think that the English were cannibals. Dodding showed Arnaq dead human bones to illustrate his point.

Shortly after the funeral, Arnaq became ill from what is thought to be measles. She died within days and was buried on the 12 November at St Stephen's Church. Kalicho and Arnaq were called Collichang and Egnock respectively in the church's burial records. Arnaq's death left Nutaaq an orphan. Nutaaq was given a nurse and taken to London for a prospective audience with Queen Elizabeth. Nutaaq also died, probably from measles. He was buried without record at St Olave's Church.

== Legacy ==
Arnaq and her son were not the first people from the Americas to visit Europe. It is estimated that 200 may have visited France in the sixteenth century. However England was behind in transatlantic journeys and only a small number of people from the Americas had visited before Arnaq had arrived. Despite not living long, Arnaq, Nutaaq and Kalicho did become well known due to the pictures drawn of them. The most noted of these are by John White who may have been on Frobisher's 1577 voyage. Another two pictures were commissioned by Queen Elizabeth who was disappointed to have not seen 'Frobisher's Inuit'. Studies of the portraits show that Arnaq had facial tattoos and details can be noted of the parka she wore.
