= Hendrik Bary =

Dutch engraver (c. 1632 – 1707)

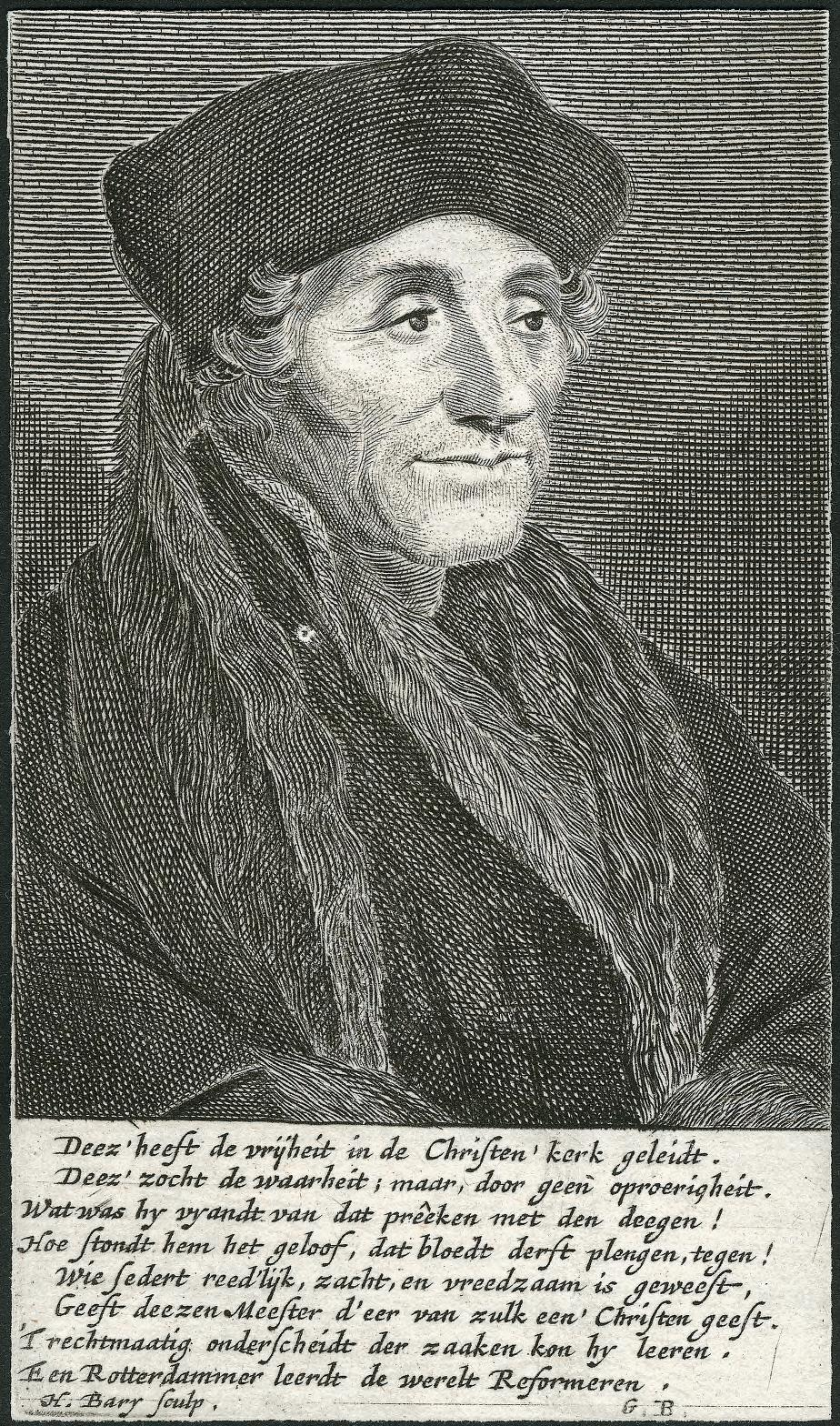
Desiderius Erasmus, engraved portrait by Bary, 1671

Hendrik Bary (c. 1632 – 16 February 1707) was a Dutch engraver.

Bary was born and died in Gouda. He appears from his style to have been either a scholar of Cornelis Visscher, or to have formed himself from his manner. We have several plates by him of portraits and various subjects, executed very neatly with the graver, which have great merit, although they are by no means equal to the works of Visscher. He generally marked his plates with his name, H. Bary, and sometimes H. B. By him we have the following:

== Portraits ==
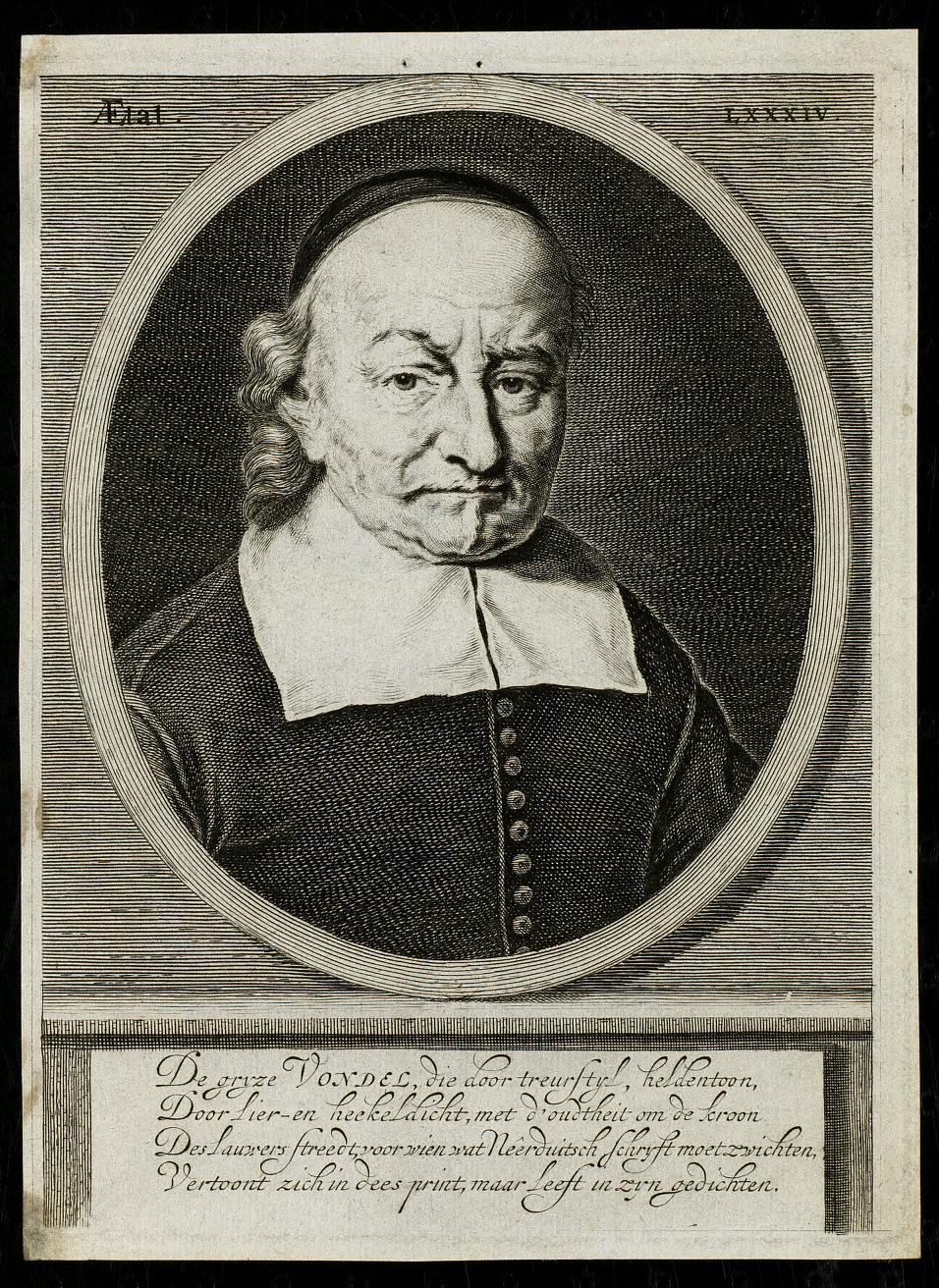
Joost van den Vondel, portrait by Bary, 1682.

- Dirk and Walther Crabeth, glass-painters.
- Adriaan Heerebord. 1659.
- Hieronimus van Bivernink.
- Desiderius Erasmus, of Rotterdam. (pictured)
- Willem Joseph Baron of Ghent, admiral of Holland.
- Rombout Hagerbeets.
- Annius Manlius Torquatus Severinus Boethius.
- Jacobus Taurinus.
- Count Johann Waldstein.
- La Duchesse de la Vallière.
- Hugo Grotius; after Mirevelt.
- Cornelis Ketel, painter; se ipse pinx. 1659.
- Jacob Backer, painter; G. Terborch pinx.; oval.
- John Schellhammer, pastor; Escopius del.
- John Zas, pastor; Chr. Pierson pinx.
- Jacob Batiliere, predicant; Westerbaem pinx.
- Arnold Gesteramus, predicant; Westerbaem pinx.
- Michael Ruyter, admiral; after F. Bol.
- Admiral Vlugh; after B. van der Helst.
- Leo Aitzema, historian; after Jan de Baan.
- George de Mey, theologian; after C. van Diemen.

== Subjects after various masters, and after his designs ==
- Neptune, emblematical.
- Allegorical title for the work of Leo van Aitzema.
- A Mother suckling her Child.
- Two Drolleries; after Brouwer; H. Bary fec., without the name of the painter.
- A Peasant Family; after Pieter Aertsen.
- Summer and Autumn, in one plate, represented by two Children, one holding a handful of Corn; after van Dyck.
- A young Woman leaning on a Table sleeping, and a young Man laughing; after the same.
- A young Lady sitting at a Table, with a Hat and Feathers; after Terborgh,
