= George Best (chronicler) =

English chronicler

George Best (1555–1584) was a member of Martin Frobisher's second and third voyages to the Americas, serving as Frobisher's lieutenant on the second voyage and as captain of the Anne Francis on the third. In 1578 he published A True Discourse of the Late Voyages of Discoverie.

== Life ==
He was the son of Robert Best, an interpreter for the Muscovy Company, and Anne Bowman, and the brother of the sea captain Thomas Best, and Henry who may have been involved in works based on the True Discourse. Sir Christopher Hatton as backer nominated Best to take part in one of the Frobisher voyages.

Best was killed in a duel with Oliver St. John, later Lord Deputy of Ireland, around March 1584. The precise motive for the duel is unclear, but it was most likely provoked by the bad-tempered St. John, who called himself "the child of wrath".

== Works ==
The True Discourse discusses the first of Frobisher's voyages, in which Best did not participate, as well as the other two (1577 and 1578), where he was an eyewitness. It was later reprinted by Richard Hakluyt in his Principal Navigations. In reprinting the material, Hakluyt removed some passages, in particular one suggesting that the aim of the exploration was prospecting for minerals, rather than the North-West Passage.
