= Cornelis Ketel =

Dutch painter (1548–1616)

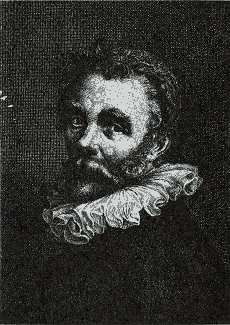
- Cornelis Ketel by Hendrik Bary
- Born: 18 March 1548; Gouda, Holland, Spain
- Died: 8 August 1616 (aged 68)
- Known for: Painting
- Movement: Mannerism
- Children: 1

Cornelis or Cornelius Ketel (18 March 1548 – 8 August 1616) was a Dutch Mannerist painter, active in Elizabethan London from 1573 to 1581, and in Amsterdam till his death. Ketel, known essentially as a portrait-painter, was also a poet and orator, and from 1595 a sculptor as well.

According to Ketel's biography, written by his contemporary Karel van Mander, he seems to have wanted to concentrate on the most prestigious of the hierarchy of genres, history painting, which included mythological subjects, but after he left France he is known almost entirely as a portrait-painter. Neither England nor Holland had much demand for large history paintings during his lifetime, and none of Ketel's histories or allegorical paintings are known to have survived intact, although drawings and prints survive. He did however significantly influence the development of the largest type of painting commonly produced in the United Provinces at this period, the civic group portrait.

== Life ==
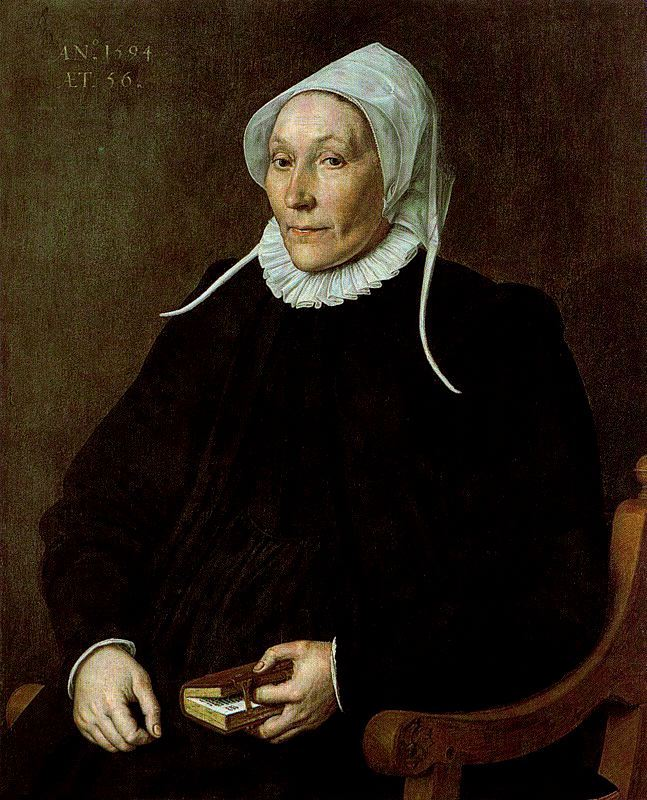
Woman Aged 56 in 1594

Ketel was born in Gouda on 18 March 1548 as an illegitimate child of Elisabeth Jacobsdr. Ketel and the art collector Govert Jans van Proyen. The famous Gouda glass painter Dirck Crabeth encouraged him to start painting as a student of his uncle, Cornelis Jacobsz. At the age of 18, he became a student of the Delft painter Anthonie Blocklandt. He later traveled to Paris where he lived with Jean de la Hame, glass-painter to King Charles IX. From Paris, he went to Fontainebleau, where he was working in 1566, in the final years of the School of Fontainebleau, a sojourn which was no doubt decisive in forming his taste for Mannerist allegory. He was forced to leave France in 1567 when all citizens of the Habsburg Netherlands were expelled.

He returned to Gouda, but the economy there was severely hit by the occupation of the city in 1572 by the Geuzen rebels, followed in 1573 by a plague which killed 20% of the population and the Dutch Revolt which was entering a new phase that destabilised daily life throughout the Netherlands. Next, Ketel is recorded in England, and was one of several exiled Netherlandish artists active at the Tudor court in the 1570s. Cornelis Ketel married Aeltgen Gerrits in London in 1573. The biographer Karel van Mander notes his portrait of Sir Christopher Hatton, of the Earl of Oxford, and various noblemen, their wives and children. In 1578, permission was granted for a portrait of Queen Elizabeth, when on a visit to Anne Seymour, Duchess of Somerset at Hanworth Park House in Middlesex.

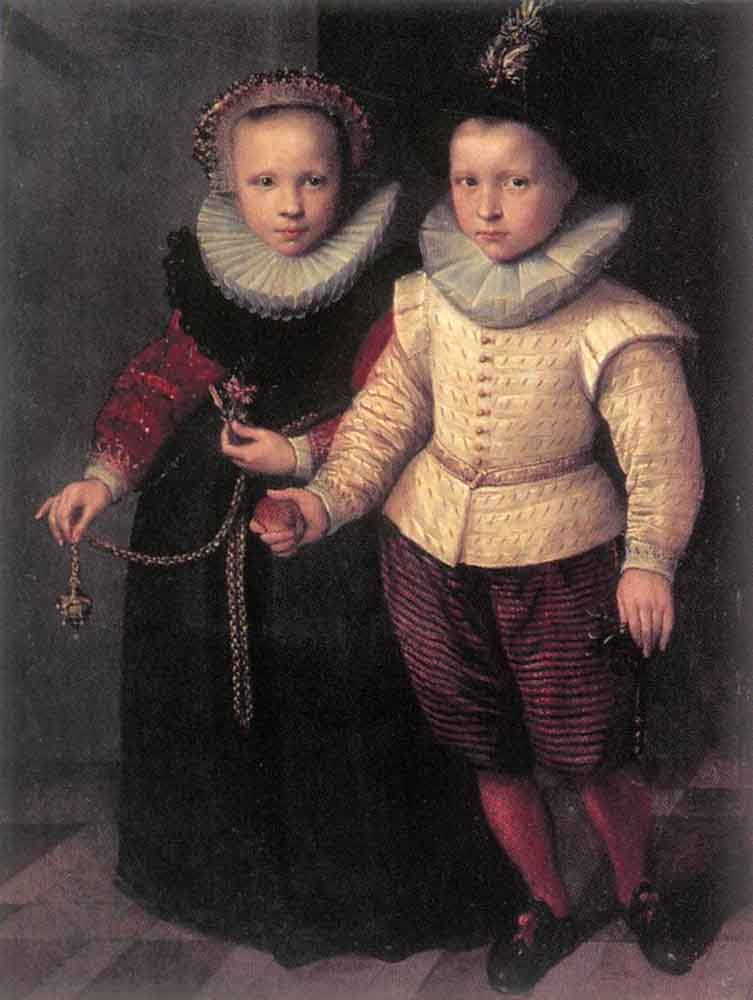
Double Portrait of a Brother and Sister, c. 1604

Finding no market in England for his preferred allegorical subjects, Ketel returned to the Low Countries as his son Rafaël was born in Amsterdam in 1581. Ketel introduced the full-length group portrait format to the Dutch burghers with great success, and seems to have been mostly commissioned as a portraitist. The Dutch taste emerging from the revolt was hostile to Mannerist allegory and even to simpler mythological subjects in art, which were widely associated with the hated Habsburgs, the rulers against whom the Dutch were rebelling. He also painted some religious subjects; it is likely he was Remonstrants, just as his friend Hendrick de Keyser, the city architect and sculptor. His son Thomas de Keyser is thought to have been pupil of Cornelis van der Voort and van der Voort (born ca. 1576) is thought to have been a pupil of Ketel; they all became successful Amsterdam portraitists and commissioned with schuttersstukken. The Danish-born Pieter Isaacsz was certainly a pupil, and Van Mander mentions more. One was Wouter Crabeth from Gouda.

After the death of wife in 1602, he remarried in 1607 to Aeltge Jans, but not in a Calvinist church as he was an Arminian or a Remonstrant. This marriage produced one son, Andries, who died at a very young age. Ketel suffered a stroke and made his will in November 1613, witnessed by Hendrick de Keyser. He died on 8 August 1616.

== Works ==
=== London years ===
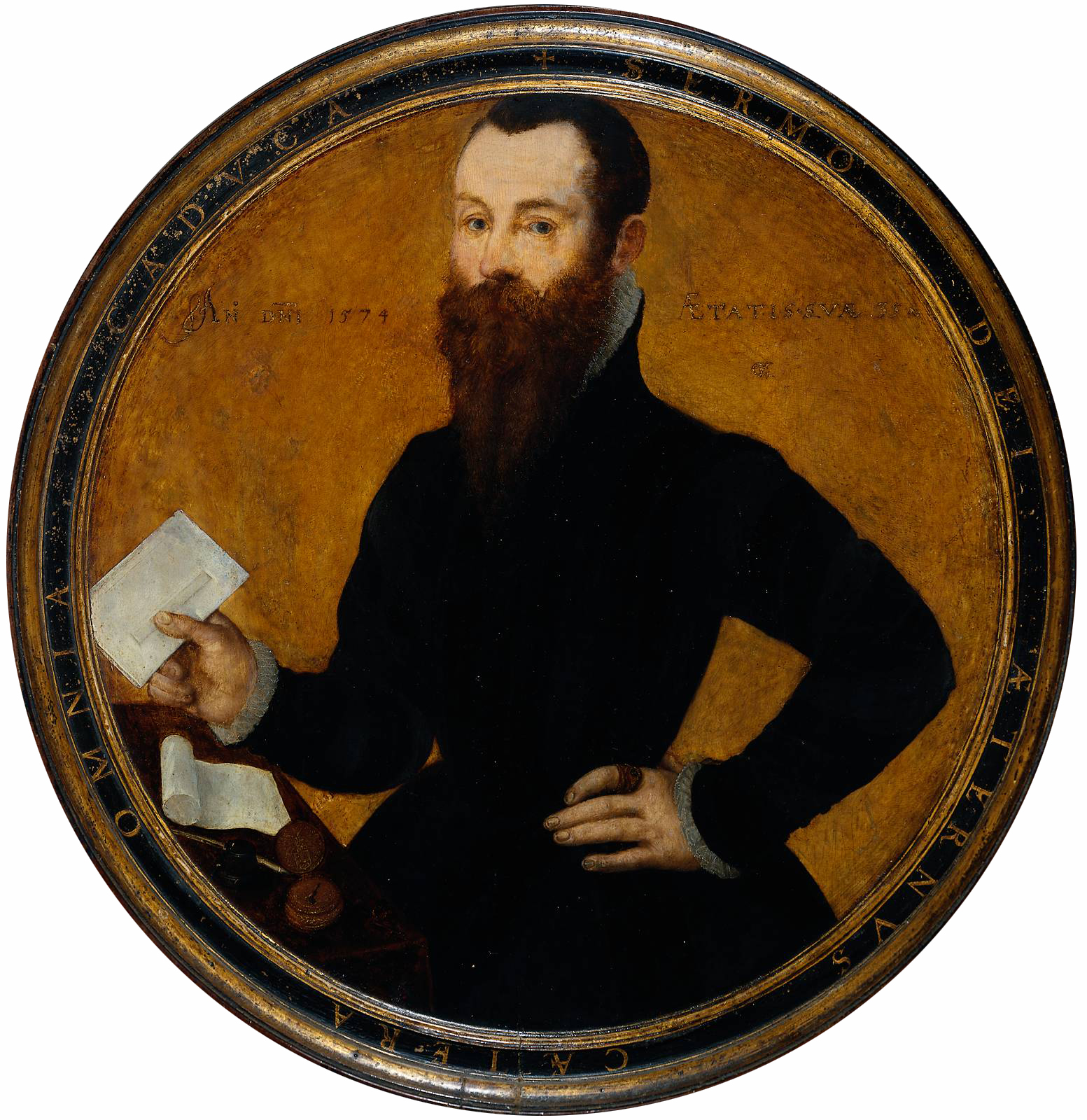
Adam Wachendorff, a merchant of the Steelyard, London, 1574

Ketel quickly established himself as a successful painter of portraits in London. Karel van Mander records that Ketel was patronized by the prosperous German Hansa merchants of the Steelyard and that a Force overcome by Wisdom and Prudence commissioned from him and presented to Sir Christopher Hatton introduced him to court circles. Hatton commissioned a portrait and Queen Elizabeth I sat to him in 1578. Ketel's large output in these years, much of which is now lost, can be estimated by the quantity of his known commissions. In 1577 Ketel was commissioned to paint a series of 19 portraits for the Cathay Company, one of which is the famous (but very damaged) full-length of Martin Frobisher now in the Bodleian Library. and several "great" paintings of Kalicho, the Inuk man Frobisher had brought back to England. Ketel's self-portrait, which was engraved by Hendrick Bary, is in the Royal Collection. Recently, a series of head-and-shoulders paintings of members of the family of Thomas "Customer" Smythe dated 1579, now widely dispersed, has been identified as the work of Cornelis Ketel.

Apparently, all of Ketel's allegorical paintings have been lost, however, a formerly lost masterpiece was discovered and exhibited at the Tate Museum, London, in 1995, in a major exhibition entitled Dynasties. Painting in Tudor and Jacobean England 1530-1630. Attribution as to title of this work, this may be the lost "Triumph of Wisdom and Prudence over Force" 1580, painted in England. (Miedema-Schulting 1988) Referred to as "Allegory", this fragment, which was recently discovered, today forms, together with the reverse of no. 55, the sole remnant of Ketel's rich production of painted allegories, described in detail in van Mander in his Schilder-Boeck of 1604 [Miedema 1994].

Records indicate that Ketel charged £1 for a head-and-shoulders portrait and £5 for a full-length. Nicholas Hilliard, then in his prime as a painter of portrait miniatures, typically charged £3 for a miniature.

=== Later works ===
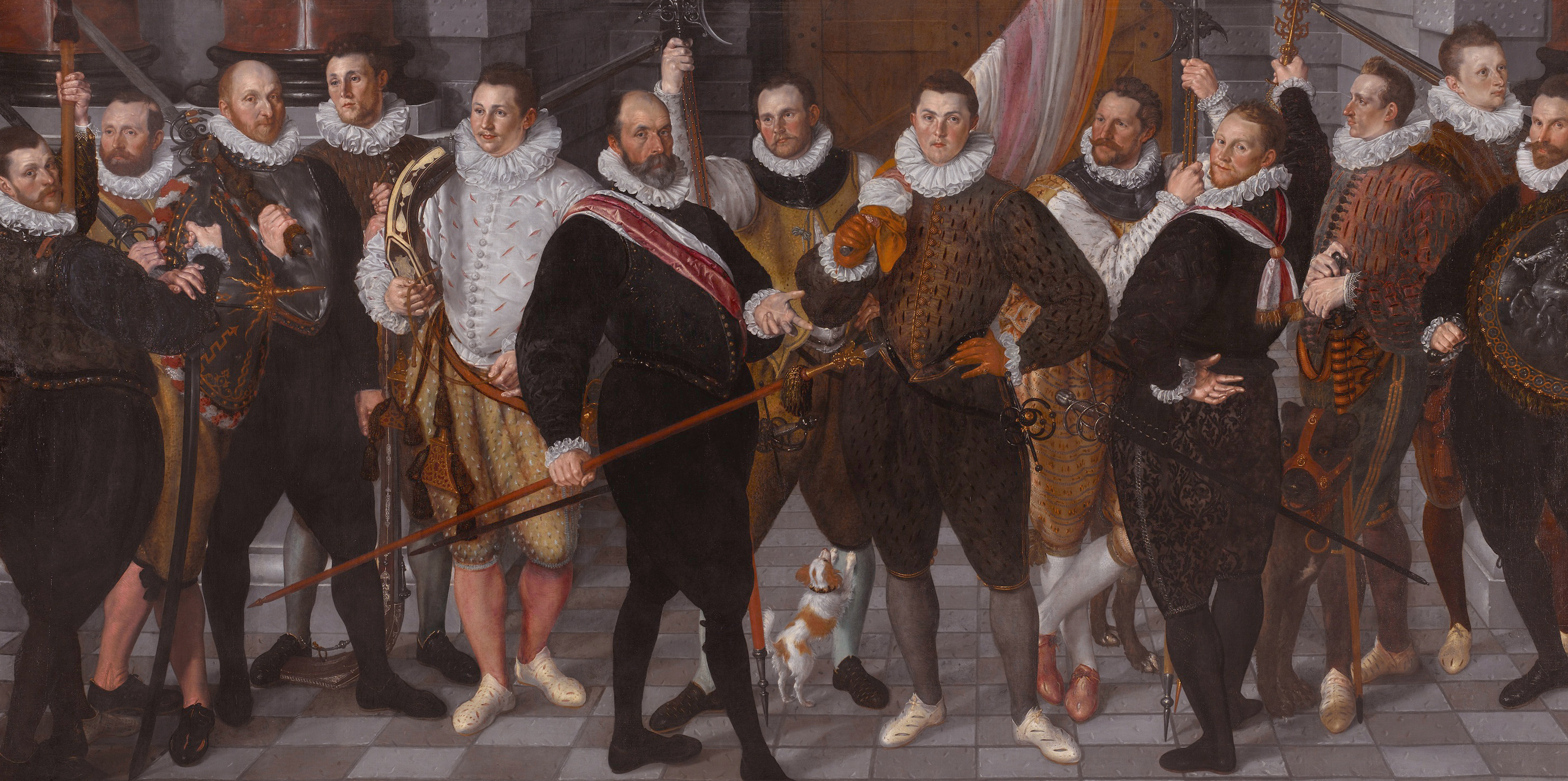
The Company of Captain Rosecrans by Cornelis Ketel, 1588. The painting has been trimmed on all sides, especially at the top

Some of Ketel's history paintings are documented in various ways, including a Democritus and a Heraclitus copied very brilliantly by Rembrandt aged around thirteen, when he was training with Pieter Lastman in Amsterdam. These were perhaps tronies, the Dutch genre of imaginary portraits of mythological or historical persons. A van Mander story describes a peasant trying to explain a Ketel Danae to his wife, and getting it confused with an Annunciation.

Ketel's 1588 The Company of Captain Rosecrans, the earliest Dutch group portrait where the figures are shown standing and full length, "greatly influenced later artists of militia pieces, such as Rembrandt in his Night Watch of 1642."—to whom one should add Frans Hals and Bartholomeus van der Helst—and set an Amsterdam tradition; Hals's Harlem groups are from knee-height only, but his great Amsterdam group is full-length. However, Ketel, like Hals, spread his sitters laterally at irregular intervals, but kept them all in a row at the front of the picture space; it was left to Rembrandt to spread his subjects deep into the picture-space as well. The picture has been trimmed on all sides, especially above; originally the city gate in front of which the group are standing was much more prominent, and in this respect closer to the Night Watch. The group also carry their weapons indoors, another innovation.

Together with Pieter Pietersz, Ketel was the leading portraitist in Amsterdam for many years, and one of the generation of Dutch portrait-painters whose increasingly sophisticated work laid the foundations for their much more famous successors. Whereas in England portraits in oils remained mostly confined to the court and gentry, in the Netherlands they were already common among the prosperous mercantile classes. Ketel lived across Oude Kerk, where he bought in 1593 a house on the so-called "Velvet Canal". Both Ketel and Pietersz developed an Amsterdam style often marked by depicting sitters "very close to the picture plane, from an unusual angle, and cropped closely by the frame" (see Double Portrait of a Brother and Sister, below). Ketel seems to have kept a stock of drawings of poses, from which a patron might choose, and which could be worked up by studio assistants without the sitter's presence being required. Van Mander records that around 1600 he at times discarded his brush and painted directly with his fingers, and even developed the trick of painting with his feet and toes—presumably just for short periods. This may have been to amuse himself and his sitters, to relieve boredom. An alternative, perhaps more likely, explanation, is that he was forced to do so by a progressive paralysis, perhaps arthritic, which finally completely overcame him by 1610–1613.

=== Gallery ===
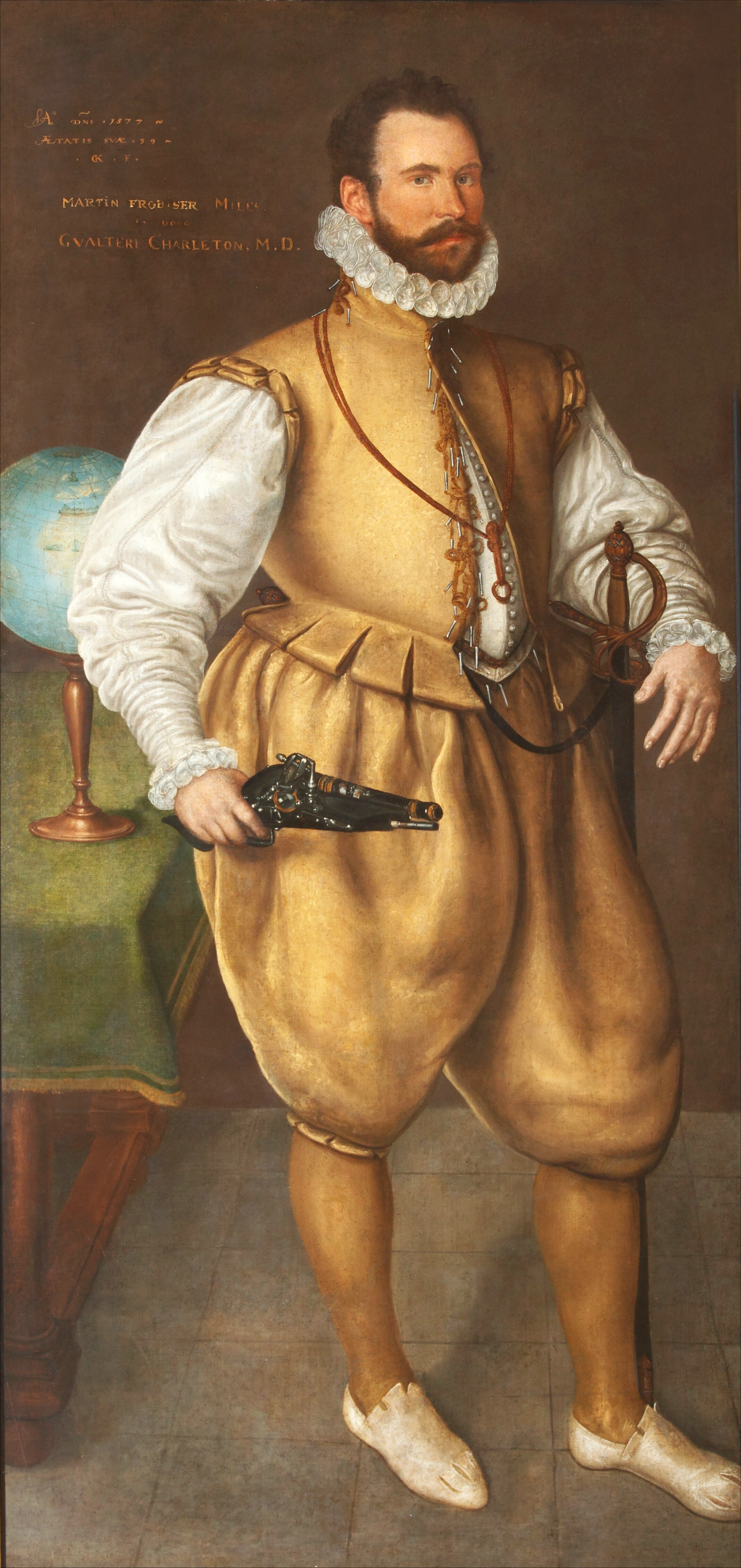
Sir Martin Frobisher, 1577

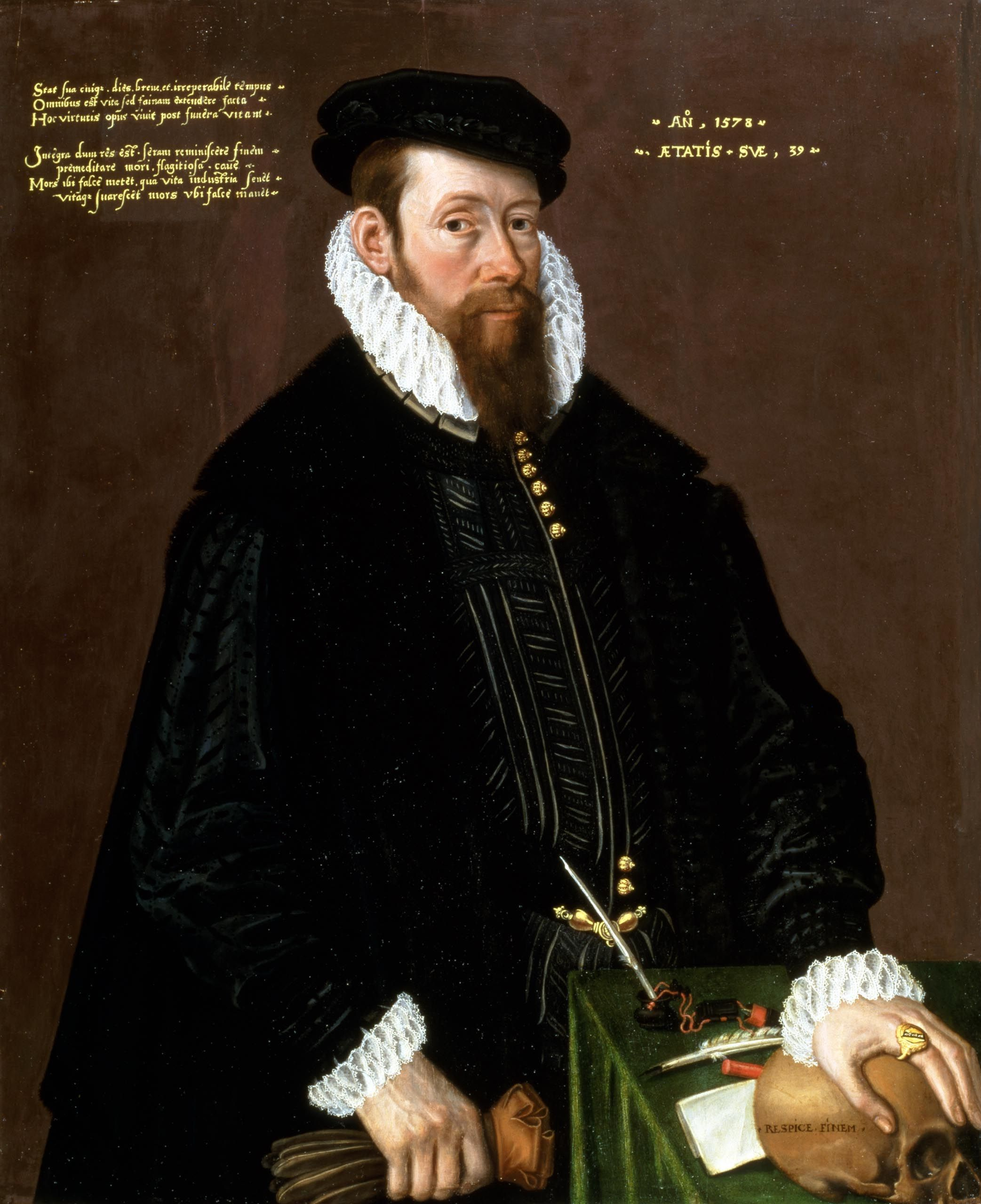
Thomas Pead, 1578. The skull is inscribed "Respice finem".

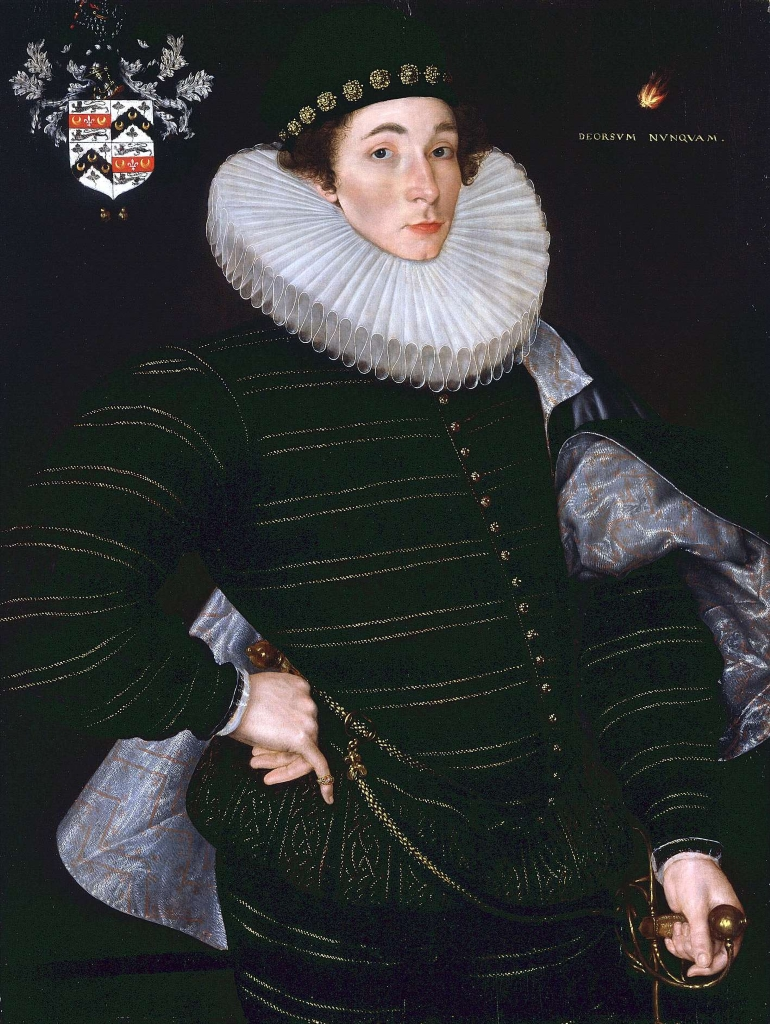
Richard Goodricke of Ribston, 1578

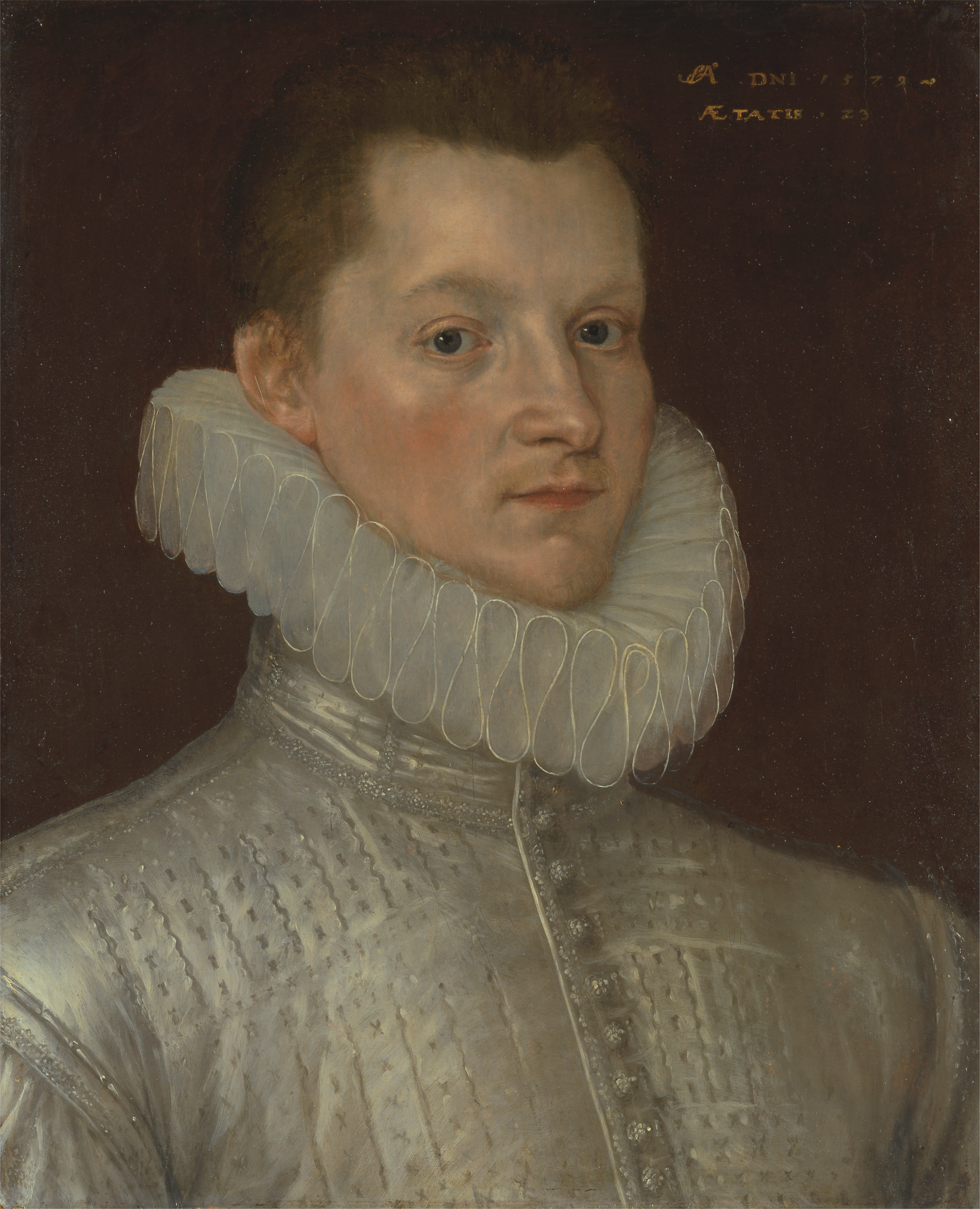
John Smythe, 1579

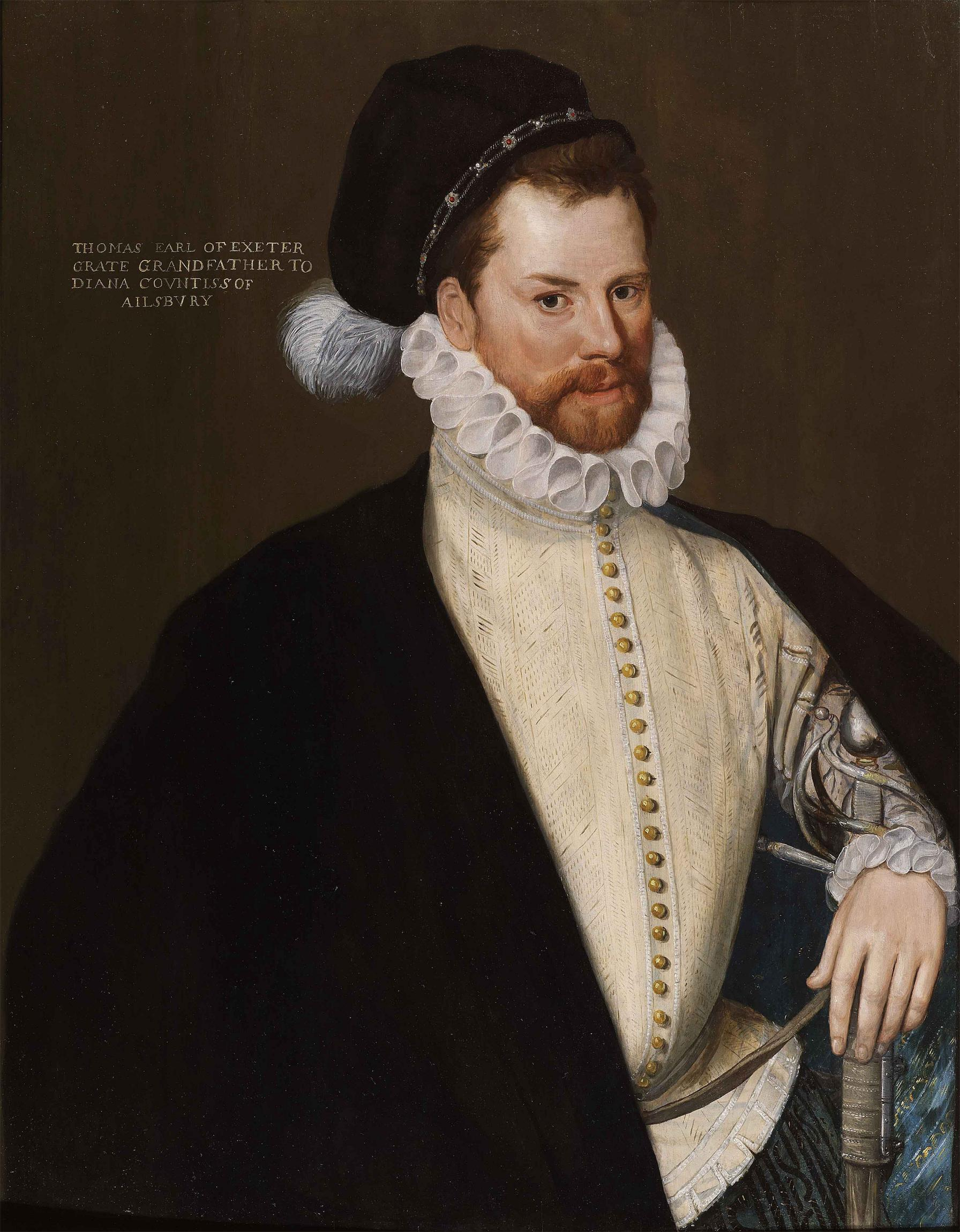
Thomas Cecil, First Earl of Exeter. 1575
