= Kalicho =

Inuk man

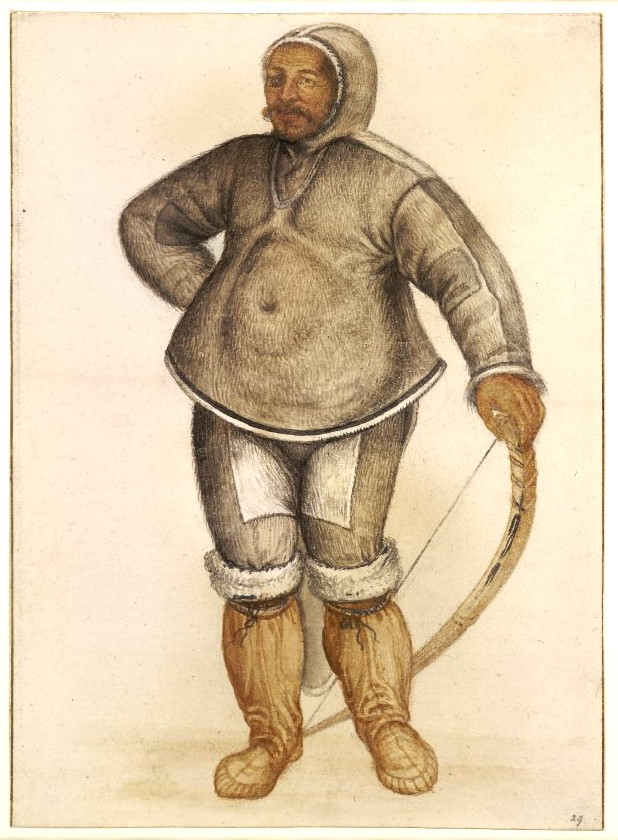
- Kalicho in a picture by John White
- Born: c.1550 Baffin Island
- Died: 8 November 1577 (aged approx. 25-26); Bristol, England
- Cause of death: Complications stemming from broken ribs
- Known for: Travelling to Britain

Kalicho was the name assigned to an Inuk man from the Frobisher Bay area of Baffin Island (now in Nunavut, Canada). He was brought back to England as a captive by Martin Frobisher in 1577. He was taken along with an unrelated Inuit woman and her infant, who were named by the English as Arnaq and Nutaaq. The three were among the first aborigines of North America to be brought to England and are among the best documented of the Tudor period.

== Life ==
Kalicho was most likely born in or around Frobisher Bay on Baffin Island in the mid-16th century. He was part of a community of hunters and fishers in the area up to the time of his capture on 19 July 1577 by the English explorer, Martin Frobisher. Kalicho's capture and experiences with the expedition in the bay were described by George Best in his 1578 account of Frobisher's three expeditions. Frobisher was leading an expedition organised by the English Cathay Company of London, which had been set up to locate a Northwest Passage around America to the Pacific. The ultimate aim of the company was to establish direct trade between England and Cathay (China).

Kalicho and Arnaq were initially taken by Frobisher as a hostages in the hope of securing the return of five Englishmen who had disappeared on an expedition to the Bay the previous summer, which Frobisher had also led. Once it became clear that a prisoner exchange would not be possible, Frobisher decided to bring the Inuit back to England. He intended to present them to Queen Elizabeth I of England and teach them to speak English. Kalicho could then be employed as a guide and interpreter on future voyages.

Kalicho, Arnaq and Nutaaq attracted considerable interest when they were brought back to the English port of Bristol at the end of September 1577. Numerous portraits were made of them. Kalicho was painted five times by the Flemish artist Cornelis Ketel, acting as an official artist of the Cathay Company of London, with other artists also taking their likenesses. They were also subject to well-documented medical examinations.

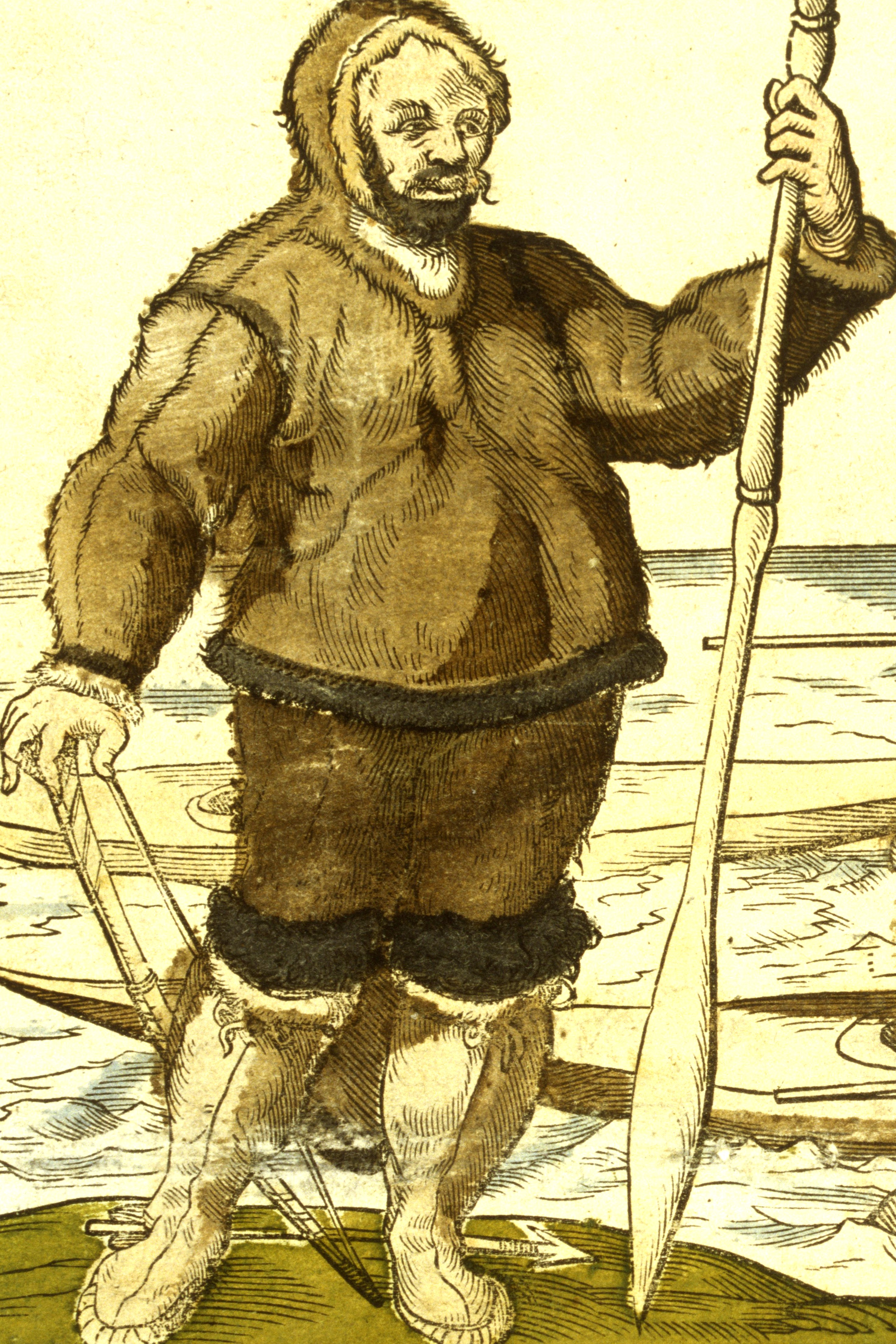
Kalicho

In Bristol, Kalicho was put up in private lodgings and dined on at least one occasion at the Mayor's house. Kalicho's kayaking and duck-hunting displays in the harbour attracted large audiences, which were remembered and described in local chronicles decades later. William Adams' Chronicle, written around the 1640s, says of the expedition:

They brought likewise a man called Callicho, and a woman called Ignorth : they were savage people and fed only upon raw flesh. On 9 October he rowed in a little boat made of skin in the water at the Backe, where he killed 2 ducks with a dart, and when he had done carried his boat through the marsh upon his back: the like he did at the Weir and other places where many beheld him. He would hit a duck a good distance off and not miss. They died here within a month.

Kalicho died in Bristol on 8 November 1577. A postmortem carried out by the physician, Edward Dodding, suggested that the death was a result of complications resulting from fractured ribs. This injury had most likely been sustained during Kalicho's capture in July. Following his death, Kalicho was buried in St Stephen's Parish Church on 8 November, described in the parish burial register as a 'heathen man'.

== Legacy ==
Kalicho was the best documented indigenous person to visit England before the 17th century. At least one of the portraits of him, along with one of Arnaq, was presented to Queen Elizabeth I of England. The artworks were hung in Hampton Court Palace until at least the late 17th century. While none of Ketel's paintings survive today, drawings made in Bristol by the English artist, John White, did survive and were acquired by the British Museum in 1866.

The depictions of Kalicho, Arnaq and Nutaaq formed the basis for numerous prints that circulated throughout Europe, providing a major reference point for the European understanding of Inuit, known as Eskimos at the time. This included Lucas de Heere's, 'Portrait of Inuit man, 1577' in his influential ethnographic work: Theatre de tous les peuples et nations de la terre.
