= Martin Frobisher =

English sea captain and privateer (1535–1594)

Sir Martin Frobisher
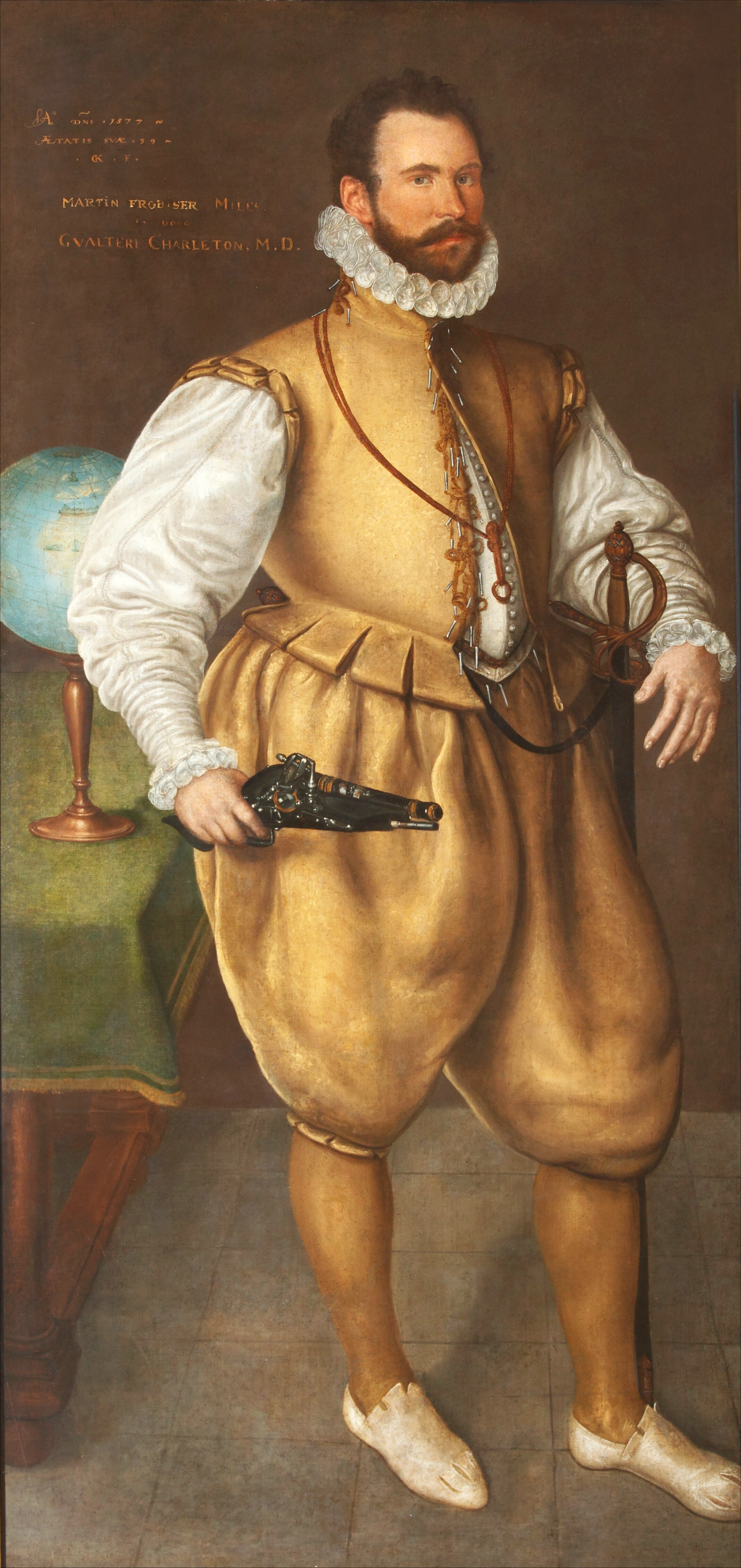
- Portrait by Cornelis Ketel, 1577
- Born: c. 1535 or 1539; Altofts, Yorkshire, England
- Died: 22 November 1594 (aged 55–59); Plymouth, England
- Occupations: Sea captain, privateer
- Spouses: Isobel Richard (m. 1559–1588) Dorothy Wentworth (m. 1590)
- Parent(s): Bernard Frobisher and Margaret York

Sir Martin Frobisher (/ˈfroʊbɪʃər/; c. 1535/1539 – 22 November 1594) was an English sea captain and privateer who made three voyages to the New World looking for the North-west Passage. He probably sighted Resolution Island near Labrador in eastern Canada, before entering Frobisher Bay and landing on present-day Baffin Island.

On his second voyage, Frobisher found what he thought was gold ore and carried 200 short tons (180 t) of it home on three ships. He initially determined a profit of £5.20 per ton (equivalent to £1,800 per ton in 2025). Encouraged, Frobisher returned to Canada with an even larger fleet and dug several mines around Frobisher Bay. He eventually carried 1,350 tons of the ore back to England, where, after years of smelting, it was realised that the ore was a worthless rock containing the mineral hornblende.

As an English privateer, he plundered riches from French ships. He was later knighted for his service in repelling the Spanish Armada in 1588. Named in his honour, Frobisher Bay lies close to Iqaluit, the capital of Nunavut.

== Early life ==
Martin Frobisher was probably born in 1535 or 1536, the son of merchant Bernard Frobisher of Altofts, Yorkshire, and Margaret York of Gouthwaite. He was the third of five children when his father died prematurely in 1542. The family was left in the care of his uncle, Francis Frobisher. Little else is known of his early life in Yorkshire; his education appears to have been rudimentary. In hopes of better opportunity, young Frobisher was sent to London in 1549 to live with a maternal relative, Sir John York. York was a wealthy and influential member of the Merchant Taylors and had important connections in the royal government.

== African Expedition ==
In 1553, Thomas Wyndham led the first English expedition to West Africa, comprising three ships and 140 men. York was an investor in the enterprise and Frobisher accompanied the fleet in an unknown capacity. After plundering Portuguese ships in the vicinity of Madeira, they made their most successful transactions on the Gold Coast, trading English cloth for 150 pounds of gold. Pushing further south they reached Benin and negotiated directly with Oba Orhogbua for 80 tons of melegueta pepper.

After some initial reluctance, Orhogbua agreed to trade but while the pepper was being gathered, disease swept through the English crew killing many of them including the expedition leader, Wyndham. Lacking sufficient sailors to crew the entire fleet, they abandoned one ship and, in their panic to leave, even left behind some members of the expedition. The return voyage was extremely difficult for the sick and short-handed crew. Another ship was lost and when the one remaining ship returned to England only 40 of the original 140 crewmen were still alive. Frobisher was one of the survivors, perhaps a confirmation of York's assessment that Frobisher had "great spirit and bould courage, and natural hardnes of body [sic]."

Despite the loss of two ships and 100 lives, the 1553 voyage was considered a financial success and investors, including York, funded another trading expedition to Portuguese Guinea in 1554. Undaunted by his first experience, Frobisher joined the new expedition and served as an apprentice merchant working for York's trading representative, John Beryn. Three ships left Dartmouth in November 1554 under the command of John Lok. This may have been Frobisher's first acquaintance with the Lok family, a relationship that would play an important role in his future.

After seven weeks' sailing, they made their first landfall near the Cestos River in present-day Liberia. They traded for a quantity of pepper and then proceeded to the Gold Coast, the West African gold trade centre. The local governor refused to deal with the English until they provided a hostage to ensure negotiations in good faith. Frobisher volunteered to serve as the hostage and discussions were allowed to proceed. However, before they could conclude a deal, a Portuguese ship appeared offshore and fired on the English fleet.

The expedition abandoned Frobisher and went elsewhere to trade, eventually returning to England with a valuable cargo of gold, pepper, and ivory. His African captors then handed Frobisher over to the Portuguese at their trading post of Mina, where he was imprisoned in the castle of São Jorge da Mina. After nine months or so, the Portuguese authorities sent him to Portugal, whence he eventually made his way back to England about 1558.

== Privateer and pirate ==
The circumstances and timing of Frobisher's return from Portugal are unclear. There is no indication of any diplomatic or financial effort to secure his release; perhaps the Portuguese simply saw no advantage to holding a low-ranking political prisoner any longer. Frobisher must have returned to the sea soon after his release. There is some evidence that by 1559, he led a voyage to the Barbary Coast to secure the release of an English hostage, Anthony Hammond. In September of the same year the well-known pirate, Henry Strangways, testified in court that Frobisher had been part of an aborted plot to attack and plunder the Portuguese fortress of Mina where Frobisher had been held captive in 1555.

On 30 September 1559, Frobisher married a Yorkshire widow, Isobel Richard, who had two young children and a substantial settlement from her previous marriage to Thomas Rigatt of Snaith. Little is known of their domestic life, but having spent all her inheritance to finance his ventures, Frobisher seems to have left her and her children by the mid-1570s; Isobel's death in a poorhouse in 1588 went unremarked by the ambitious captain.

In 1563, Frobisher became involved in a privateering venture with his brother, John Frobisher, and a fellow Yorkshireman, John Appleyard. Appleyard was licensed to seize ships of the French Catholic party and financed a fleet of three vessels. Martin Frobisher captained one vessel and may have been fleet commander. By May 1563, they had seized five French ships and brought them to Plymouth harbour. Frobisher was promptly arrested by officers of the Privy Council because his ship had also participated in the seizure of a Spanish ship which resulted in the death of 40 Englishmen. The leader of this attack was the pirate Thomas Cobham, who gave Frobisher the Spanish cargo of tapestries and wine. Possession of these goods was sufficient evidence to land Frobisher in prison.

In 1564, Frobisher was released from prison. In 1565, he purchased two ships, the Mary Flower and William Baxter. His stated intention was to outfit the ships for a trading expedition to the Guinea coast. Based on previous experience, officials were skeptical of his motives and when a storm drove him into Scarborough, he was seized along with the William Baxter. His brother, John Frobisher, was captain of the Mary Flower and escaped arrest. Martin Frobisher was once again imprisoned briefly by the admiralty court.

On 31 October 1566, Frobisher was again set free on the condition that he refrain from going to sea without a license. In 1568, he commanded the Robert in service to the exiled Cardinal of Chatillon who licensed at least six vessels to prey on French shipping. For a brief time Frobisher associated with other notable privateers including John Hawkins and William Winter. However, Frobisher refused to limit his depredations to French Catholic vessels and also seized Protestant ships carrying English goods. In 1569, he was again arrested by admiralty officers and imprisoned first at Fleet prison and then at Marshalsea. He might have remained there for some time if not for the intervention of the lord admiral, Edward Fiennes de Clinton and the secretary of state, William Cecil. With their help, Frobisher was free again in March 1570.

The terms of his release are unknown but it appears that Frobisher was required to undertake certain assignments at the direction of the Privy Council. In October 1571, he was commissioned to command four ships in the search for pirates and smugglers along the English coast. There is no indication that he had any success in this effort. In 1572, he was directed to the Irish coast to provide logistical support for the English campaign against the Desmond Rebellions.

Starting in 1571, Frobisher was involved in various plots that ran counter to government interest. He possibly had the tacit approval of the Privy Council, suggesting that he may have been working as a double agent. He was briefly associated with a plan to help the Earl of Desmond flee England; then a proposal to lead a group of disaffected English mercenaries to seize Flushing for the Spanish king; and finally, in 1573, a plot to capture the English rebel, Thomas Stukley.

According to the Dictionary of National Biography, the first direct notice of Frobisher apparently is an account in the state papers of two interrogations in 1566, "on suspicion of his having fitted out a vessel as a pirate". On 21 August 1571, Captain E. Horsey wrote to Lord Burghley from Portsmouth that he "has expedited the fitting out of a hulk for M. Frobisher"; this is the earliest mention of Frobisher being in the Crown's employ. Burghley, then chief minister of the Queen, became Lord High Treasurer in 1572. From the latter part of 1571 to 1572, Frobisher was in the public service at sea off the coast of Ireland.

== North-west passage ==
Throughout much of the sixteenth century, the feasibility of a northern route to Cathay and the East Indies was debated and tested by England. In 1508, Sebastian Cabot led one of the first expeditions to search for a North-west Passage. In the 1530s, Robert Thorne and Roger Barlow tried unsuccessfully to interest Henry VIII in a plan to sail directly over the North Pole to China. In 1551 a company of English merchants (later known as the Muscovy Company) was formed to search for a northeast passage to Cathay. The initiative failed to find a route but did establish a long-lasting trade relationship with Russia. In the 1560s Humphrey Gilbert was an influential advocate for seeking a North-west Passage and penned a detailed treatise in support of the idea.

Although Frobisher may have expressed interest in a search for the North-west Passage as early as 1560, it was only much later that he actively pursued the idea. In 1574, Frobisher petitioned the Privy Council for permission and financial support to lead an expedition to find a north-west passage to "the Southern Sea" (the Pacific Ocean) and thence to Cathay. Some of its members were intrigued by his proposal, but cautiously referred him to the Muscovy Company, an English merchant consortium which had previously sent out several parties searching for the Northeast Passage around the Arctic coasts of Norway and Russia, and held exclusive rights to any northern sea routes to the East.

=== First voyage ===
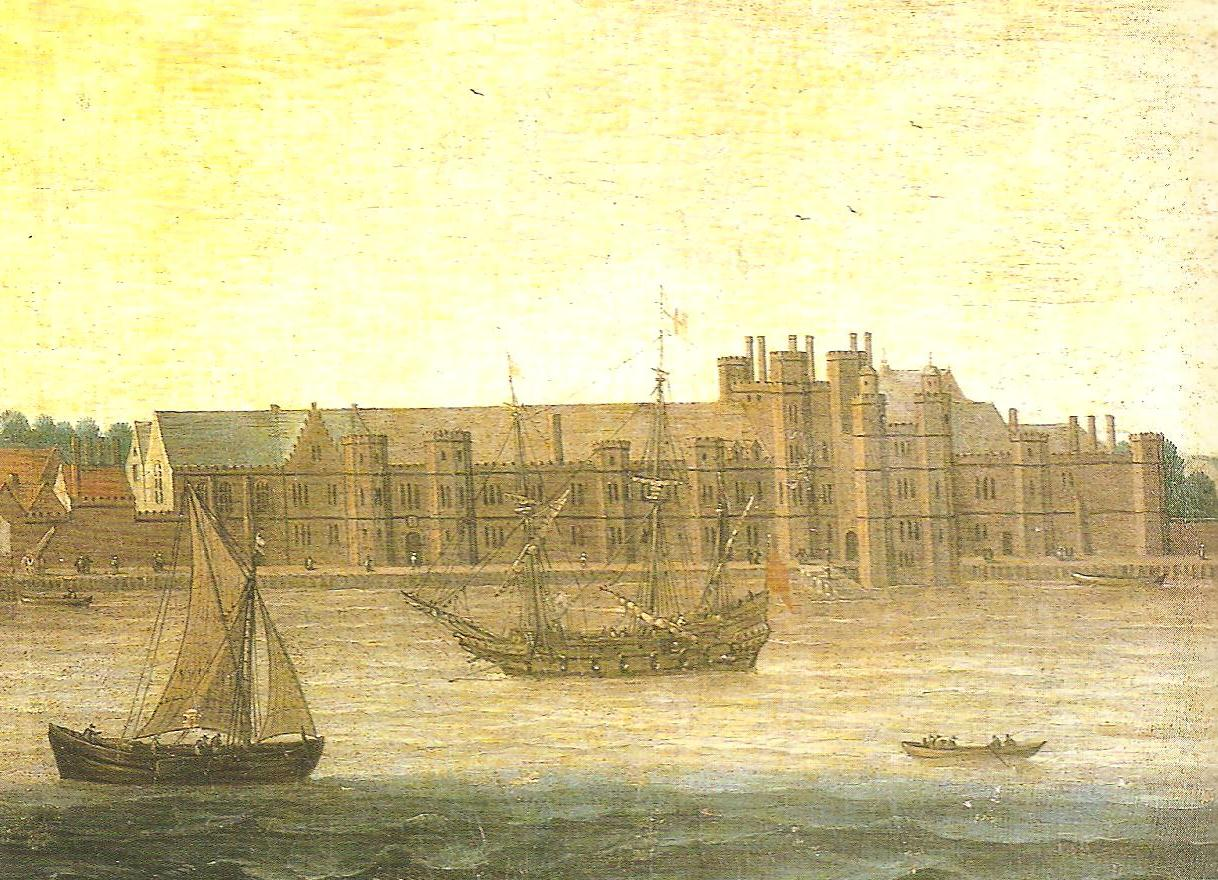
Greenwich Palace on the south bank of the River Thames, from a window of which Queen Elizabeth waved to the departing ships (by an unknown artist)

In 1576, Frobisher persuaded the Muscovy Company to license his expedition. With the help of the company's director, Michael Lok (whose well-connected father William Lok had held an exclusive mercers' licence to provide Henry VIII with fine cloths), Frobisher was able to raise enough capital for three barques: Gabriel and Michael of about 20–25 tons each, and an unnamed pinnace of 10 tons, with a total crew of 35. Queen Elizabeth I sent word that she had "good liking of their doings", and the ships weighed anchor at Blackwall on 7 June 1576. As they headed downstream on the Thames, Elizabeth waved to the departing ships from a window of Greenwich Palace, while cannons fired salutes and a large assembly of the people cheered.

On 26 June 1576, the little fleet reached the Shetland Islands, where it stopped to repair a leak in Michael's hull and repair the barques' water casks. The ships hoisted sail the same evening and set course westwards, sailing west by north for three days until a violent storm arose and pounded them continuously through 8 July. On 11 July 1576, they sighted the mountains of the southeastern tip of Greenland, which they mistook for the non-existent island called 'Friesland'. Crossing the Davis Strait, they encountered another violent storm in which the pinnace was sunk and Michael turned back to England, but Gabriel sailed on for four days until her crew sighted what they believed was the coast of Labrador. The landmass was actually the southernmost tip of Baffin Island; Frobisher named it "Queen Elizabeth's Foreland".

The ship reached the mouth of Frobisher Bay a few days later, and because ice and wind prevented further travel north, Frobisher determined to sail westwards up the bay, which he believed to be the entrance to the North-west Passage, naming it Frobisher's Strait, to see "whether he might carry himself through the same into some open sea on the backside". Gabriel sailed northwestwards, keeping in sight of the bay's north shore. On 18 August 1576, Burch's Island was sighted and named after the ship's carpenter who first spied it; there the expedition met some local Inuit. Having made arrangements with one of the Inuit to guide them through the region, Frobisher sent five of his men in a ship's boat to return him to shore, instructing them to avoid getting too close to any of the others. The boat's crew disobeyed, however, and five of Frobisher's men were taken captive.

After days of searching, Frobisher could not recover the insubordinate sailors, and eventually took hostage a native man to see if an exchange for the missing boat's crew could be arranged. The captive refused to communicate with his fellow Inuit and Frobisher's men were never seen again by their fellows, but Inuit oral tradition tells that the men lived among them for a few years of their own free will until they died attempting to leave Baffin Island in a self-made boat.

Meanwhile, the local man, "Wherupon, when he founde himself in captivitie, for very choler and disdain, he bit his tong in twayne within his mouth: notwithstanding, he died not therof, but lived untill he came in Englande, and then he died of colde which he had taken at sea."

Frobisher turned homewards, and was well received by the Queen when he docked in London on 9 October. Among the things which had been hastily brought away by the men was a black stone "as great as a half-penny loaf" which had been found loose on the surface of Hall's Island of Baffin Island by the shipmaster, Robert Garrard, who took it to be sea-coal, of which they had to need. Frobisher took no account of the black rock but kept it as a token of possession of the new territory.

Michael Lok said that Frobisher, upon his return to London from the Arctic, had given him the black stone as the first object taken from the new land. Lok brought samples of the stone to the royal assayer in the Tower of London and two other expert assayers, all of whom declared that it was worthless, saying that it was marcasite and contained no gold. Lok then took the "ore" to an Italian alchemist living in London, Giovanni Battista Agnello, who claimed it was gold-bearing. Agnello assayed the ore three times and showed Lok small amounts of gold dust; when he was challenged as to why the other assayers failed to find gold in their specimens, Agnello replied, "Bisogna sapere adulare la natura" ("One must know how to flatter nature"). Ignoring the negative reports, Lok secretly wrote to the Queen to inform her of the encouraging result, and used this assessment to lobby investors to finance another voyage. Subsequently the stone became the focus of intense attention by the Cathay enterprise's venturers, who saw in it the possibility of vast profits to be derived from mining the rocky islands of Meta Incognita; gossip spread in the court and from there throughout London about the gold powder Agnello was supposedly deriving from the rock.

=== Second voyage ===
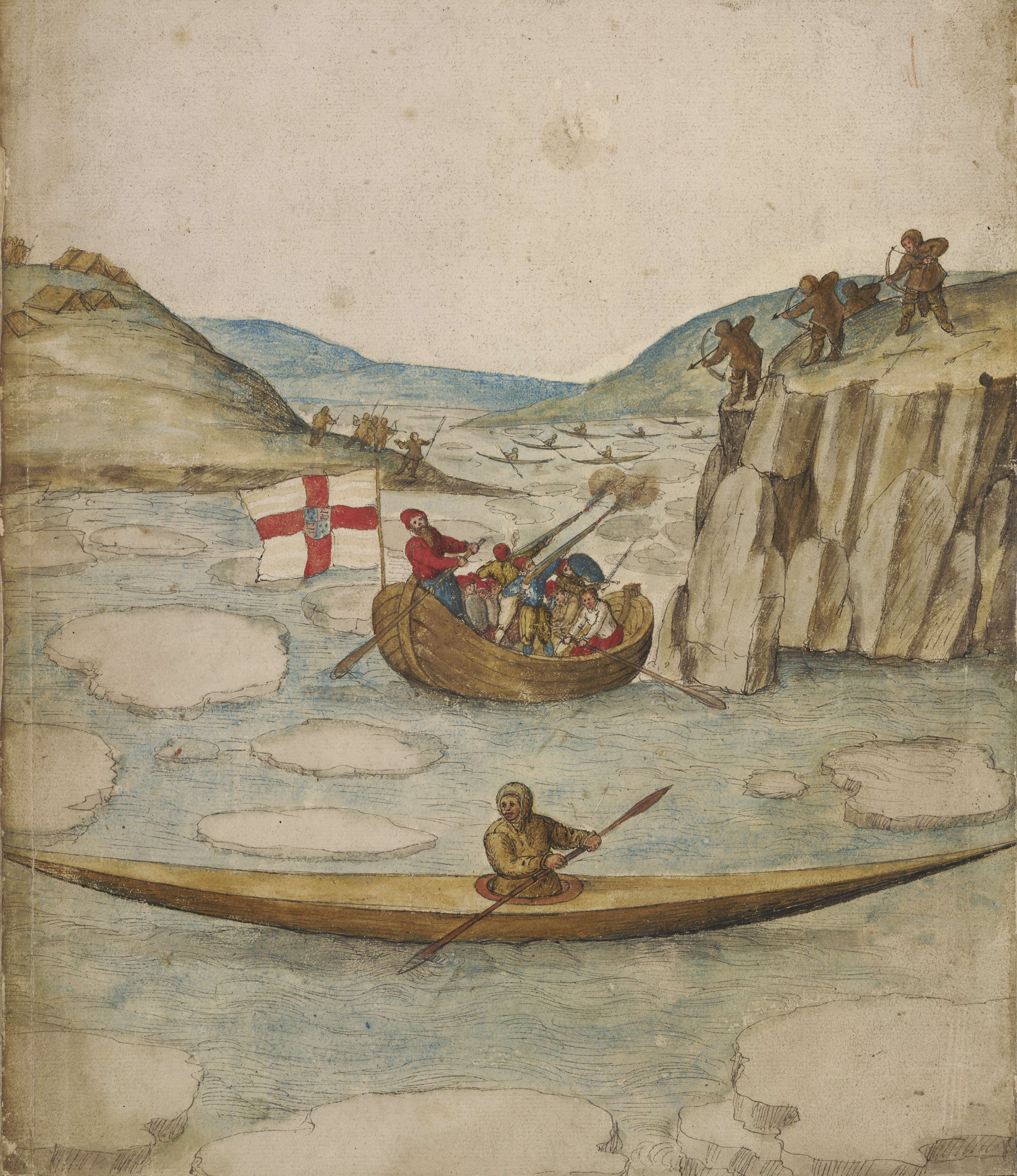
Skirmish between Martin Frobisher's men and Inuit, c. 1577.

In 1577, a much bigger expedition than the former was fitted out. The Queen lent the 200-ton ship Aid or Ayde to the Company of Cathay (Frobisher's biographer James McDermott says she sold it) and invested £1000 (equivalent to £343,000 in 2025) in the expedition. Prior to 30 March 1577, Frobisher petitioned the Queen to be confirmed as High Admiral of the north-western seas and governor of all lands discovered, and to receive five per cent of profits from trade. It is unknown whether or not his request was ever granted. Michael Lok, meanwhile, was petitioning the queen for his own charter, by the terms of which the Company of Cathay would have sole rights to exploit the resources of all seas, islands and lands to the west and north of England, as well as any goods produced by the peoples occupying them; Frobisher would be apportioned a much smaller share of the profits. Lok's request was ignored and a charter was never issued, nor was a royal license granted, creating corporate ambiguity that redounded to the Queen's benefit.

Besides Ayde, the expedition included the ships Gabriel and Michael; Frobisher's second-in-command aboard Ayde was Lieutenant George Best (who later wrote the most informative account of the three voyages) with Christopher Hall as master, while the navigator Edward Fenton was in command of Gabriel. The learned John Dee, one of the preeminent scholars of England, acquired shares in the Cathay Company's venture, and instructed Frobisher and Hall in the use of navigational instruments and the mathematics of navigation, as well as advising them which books, charts, and instruments the expedition should purchase. The fleet left Blackwall on 27 May 1577 and headed down the Thames, ostensibly having, per the instructions of the Privy Council, a maximum complement of 120 men, including 90 mariners, gunners and carpenters to crew the ship, as well as refiners, merchants, and thirty Cornish miners; this figure included a group of convicts to be expatriated and put to use as miners in the new lands. Frobisher had exceeded the assigned quota of crewmen by at least twenty men, and perhaps by as many as forty. Letters from the Privy Council were waiting for him at Harwich, however, commanding him to trim the excess; consequently, he sent the convicts and several seamen ashore at the harbour on 31 May and set sail northwards to Scotland. The fleet anchored at St Magnus Sound in the Orkney Islands on 7 June 1577 to take on water, and weighed anchor that evening. It enjoyed fair weather and favourable winds on its passage across the Atlantic, and "Friesland" (southern Greenland) was first sighted on 4 July. Hall and Frobisher each attempted landing in the ship's boat but were driven back by fog and the certain knowledge of unseen ice in the water before them.

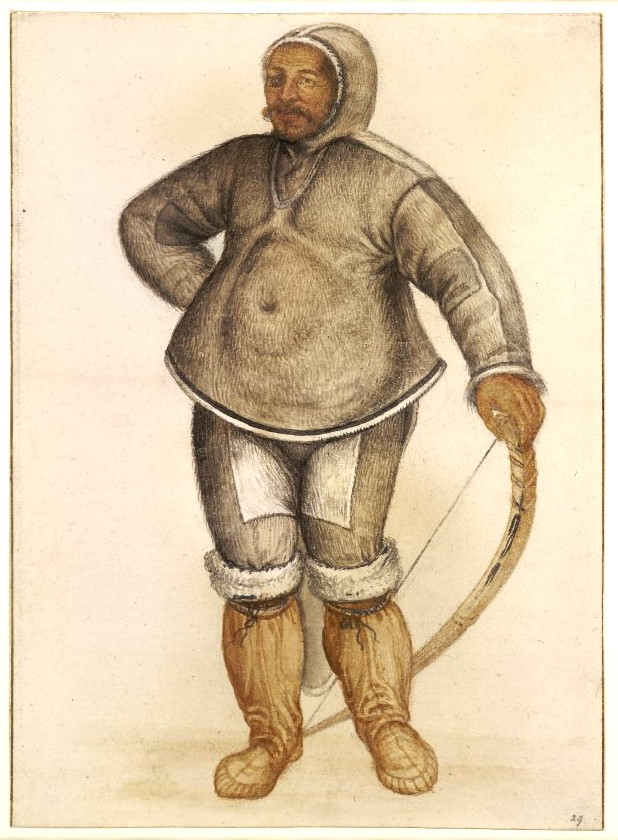
The Inuk "Calichough" or "Kalicho". Watercolour by John White

On 8 July 1577, presented with no opportunity to land, Frobisher set his course westwards. The ships were caught almost immediately in severe storms and separated, each of them lowering their sails for long intervals. They continued this way for several days, tracking before the wind until the weather cleared on 17 July and the fleet was able to regroup, a testament to the skill of the masters. A sailor aboard Ayde spied Hall's Island at the mouth of Frobisher Bay the same evening. The next day, Frobisher and a small party landed at Little Hall's Island in Ayde's pinnace to search for more samples of the black ore acquired originally by Robert Garrard, but found none. On 19 July, Frobisher and forty of his best men landed at Hall's Island and made their way to its highest point, which he dubbed Mount Warwick in honour of the Earl of Warwick, one of the principal investors in the expedition. There they piled a cairn of stones to mark possession of the new land and prayed solemnly for the success of their venture.

Several weeks were now spent in collecting ore, but very little was done in the way of discovery, Frobisher being specially directed by his orders from the Company of Cathay to "defer the further discovery of the passage until another time". There was much parleying and some skirmishing with the Inuit, and earnest but futile attempts were made to recover the five men captured the previous year. The expedition's return to England commenced on 23 August 1577, and Ayde reached Milford Haven in Wales on 23 September. Gabriel and Michael later arrived separately at Bristol and Yarmouth.

Frobisher brought with him three Inuit who had been forcibly taken from Baffin Island: a man called Calichough or Kalicho, a woman, Egnock or Arnaq, and her child, Nutioc or Nuttaaq. All three died soon after their arrival in England, Calichough dying from a wound suffered when a rib was broken unintentionally during his capture and eventually punctured his lung.

Frobisher was received and thanked by the queen at Windsor. Great preparations were made and considerable expense incurred for the assaying of the great quantity of "ore" (about 200 tons) brought home. This took much time and led to disputes among the various interested parties.

=== Third voyage ===
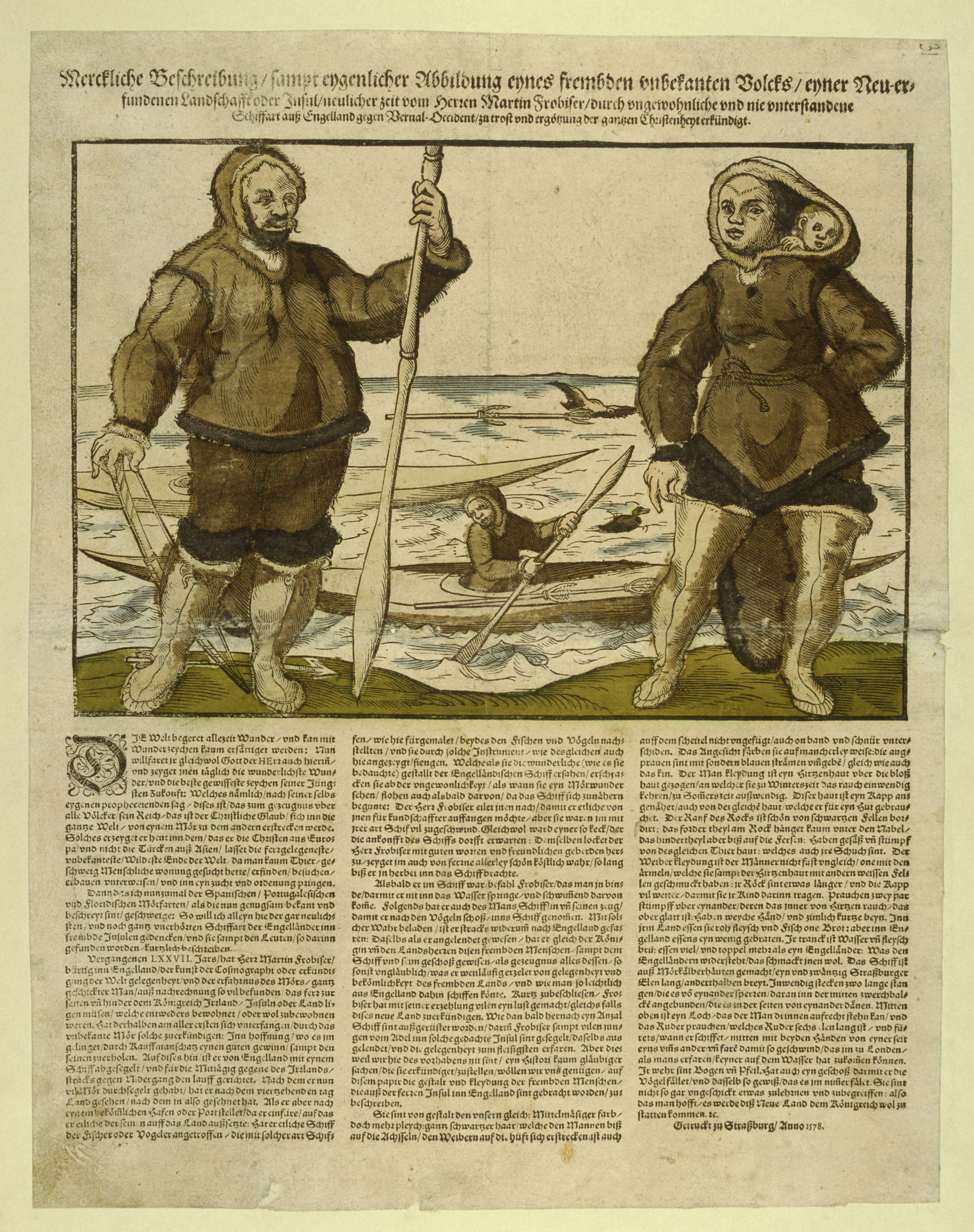
Printed text in German telling of Martin Frobisher's third voyage. Illustrated are the three Inuit, Kalicho; Arnaq, and her child Nuttaaq, forcibly brought back to Bristol by Frobisher from his second expedition to Baffin Island in late 1577.

Meanwhile, the Queen and others in her retinue maintained a strong faith in the potential productivity of the newly discovered territory, which she herself named Meta Incognita (Latin: Unknown Shore). It was resolved to send out the largest expedition yet, with everything necessary to establish a colony of 100 men. Frobisher was again received by the queen, whereupon she threw a chain of fine gold around his neck.

The expedition consisted of fifteen vessels: the flagship Ayde, Michael, and Gabriel, as well as Judith, Dennis or Dionyse, Anne Francis, Francis of Foy and Moon of Foy, Bear of Leycester, Thomas of Ipswich, Thomas Allen, Armenall, Soloman of Weymouth, Hopewell, and Emanuel of Bridgwater. There were over 400 men aboard the ships, with 147 miners, 4 blacksmiths, and 5 assayers in the crew.

On 3 June 1578, the expedition left Plymouth and, sailing through the Channel, on 20 June reached the south of Greenland, where Frobisher and some of his men managed to land. On 2 July 1578, the foreland of Frobisher Bay was sighted. Stormy weather and dangerous ice prevented the rendezvous, and, besides causing the wreck on an iceberg of the 100-ton barque Dennis, drove the fleet unwittingly up a waterway that Frobisher named "Mistaken Strait". He believed that the strait, now known as Hudson Strait, was less likely to be an entrance to the North-west Passage than Frobisher Bay ("Frobisher's Strait" to him). After proceeding about sixty miles up the new strait, Frobisher with apparent reluctance turned back, and after many buffetings and separations, the fleet at last came to anchor in Frobisher Bay. During this voyage, the vessel Emanuel claimed to have found the phantom Buss Island. The first known Anglican service in Canada was performed by a chaplain in Frobisher's expedition.

Some attempt was made at founding a settlement, and a large quantity of ore was shipped, but dissension and discontent prevented the establishment of a successful colony. On the last day of August 1578, the fleet set out on its return and reached England at the beginning of October, although the vessel Emanuel was wrecked en route at Ard na Caithne on the west coast of Ireland. The ore was taken to a specially constructed smelting plant at Powder Mill Lane in Dartford; assiduous efforts to extract gold and further assays were made over five years, but the ore proved to be a valueless rock containing hornblende and was eventually salvaged for road metalling and wall construction. The Cathay Company went bankrupt and Michael Lok was ruined, being sent to debtors' prison several times.

== Anglo-Spanish War ==
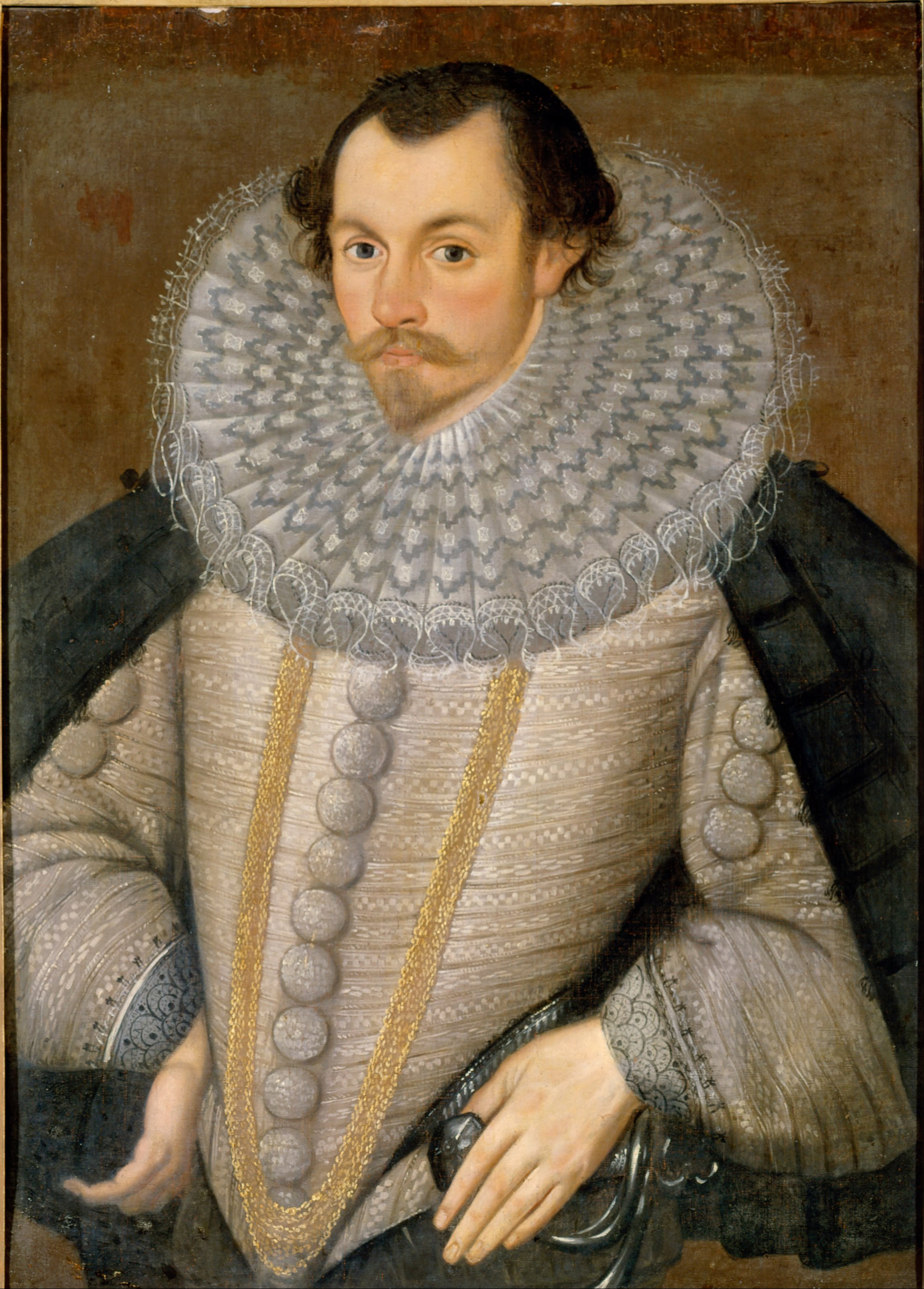
The man on this portrait has traditionally been identified as Frobisher, but there is some disagreement. (British School, Dulwich Picture Gallery)

Finding his reputation as an adventurer-explorer damaged following the disastrous outcome of the Cathay Company venture, and that his services in that line were no longer required, Frobisher sought other employment. He applied to a major shareholder in the Arctic enterprise, Sir William Wynter, one of the Queen's most trusted naval commanders, who was leading a fleet of four heavily armed vessels to Ireland under orders to put down the Desmond rebellion against the English Crown. Frobisher secured an appointment as captain of Foresight and sailed in early March 1580; in November, he participated in the Siege of Smerwick at the Dingle Peninsula, a rocky promontory on the southwestern shore of County Kerry, where Emanuel had wrecked two years previously.

Frobisher joined Francis Drake on his 1585 raids of Spanish ports and shipping in the West Indies as vice-admiral of Drake's fleet, appointed to that position by the Queen; his flagship was the Primrose. Shortly after the voyage began, Frobisher was admitted to a select group of advisors to Drake (together with Christopher Carleill, Nichols, and Fenner). On 20 July 1588, the Spanish Armada set sail from Corunna in Galicia to escort the Army of Flanders, led by the Duke of Parma, to invade England. Sir Francis Walsingham sent a dispatch to Whitehall stating that the Armada had been sighted in the chops (entrance) of the Channel that day. When the two navies first engaged, Frobisher was in command of Triumph, the Royal Navy's largest ship, leading a consort of the ships Merchant Royal, Margaret and John, Centurion, Golden Lion and Mary Rose.

=== Spanish Armada ===
Following a council of war, Lord Howard, the Lord High Admiral of the Fleet, reorganised the English fleet into four squadrons. Frobisher was made commander of one of these and assigned Triumph, as well as Lord Sheffield's White Bear, Lord Thomas Howard's Golden Lion, and Sir Robert Southwell's Elizabeth Jonas, all heavily armed vessels. On the morning of 21 July 1588, Frobisher in Triumph, Drake in Revenge, and Hawkins in Victory attacked the seaward wing of the Spanish defensive formation, damaging San Juan de Portugal, the ship of the Armada's vice-admiral, Juan Martínez de Recalde, and forcing his rescue by galleasses from the Bizcayan squadron. Later that day Frobisher and Hawkins engaged Pedro de Valdez, commander of the Andalusian squadron, who did not yield his ship, Nuestra Señora del Rosario (Our Lady of the Rosary) until Drake came to their assistance the next morning, much to his rival Frobisher's consternation. Three days later, the English fleet was reinforced by Lord Seymour's channel patrol of thirty-five or forty sail, and Frobisher assumed command of his newly formed squadron.

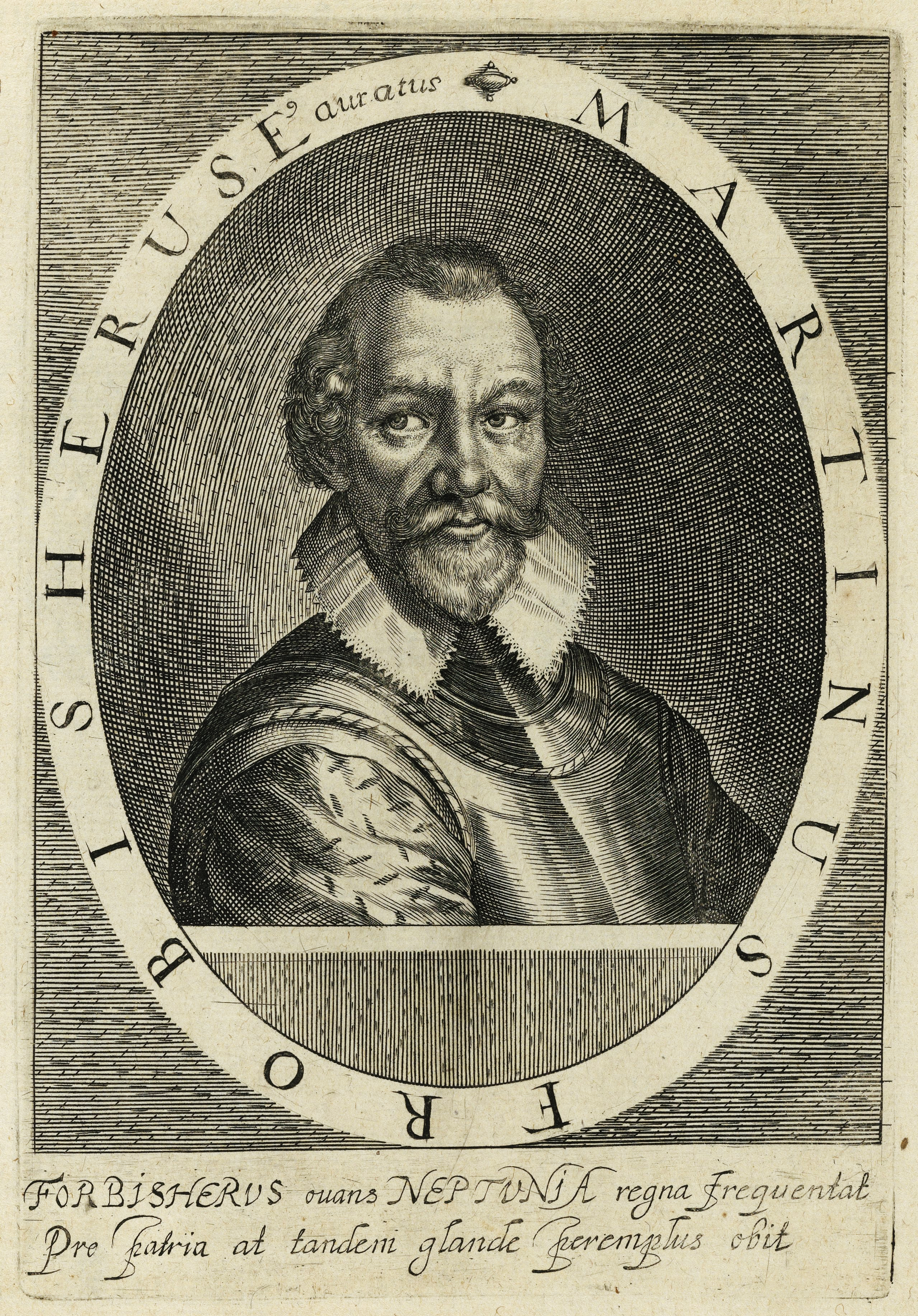
Two decades after his death, this portrait of Frobisher was created for the Heroologia Anglica, a collection of engraved portraits of illustrious English people (1620).

Frobisher's squadron was close inshore at dawn on 25 July 1588, the only one landwards of the Armada that morning; the sea was dead calm when he engaged the Duke of Medina Sidonia's flagship San Martín and gave her another pummeling like that of a few days past. However, a breeze rose from the southwest, allowing several Spanish galleons to move in and save their flagship. The other English ships withdrew in time, but Triumph was caught on the lee shore off Dunnose cape on the Isle of Wight, and more than thirty Armada ships bore down upon him. Frobisher used his boats to manoeuvre Triumph with good effect and managed to escape when the wind shifted again, allowing him the weather gage.

Frobisher was knighted for valour on 26 July 1588 by Lord Howard aboard Howard's flagship Ark Royal, alongside Sheffield, Thomas Howard, and Hawkins. Two days later the English launched eight fire ships into the midst of the Armada at its moorings, forcing its captains to cut their anchors; the decisive action was fought 29 July 1588 on the shoals off Gravelines, where Frobisher, Drake, and Hawkins pounded the Spanish ships with their guns. Drake in Revenge gave Medina Sidonia's flagship, San Martin, a full broadside while Thomas Fenner in Nonpareil followed his example and the rest of Drake's squadron did the same. Even so, San Martin sustained no major damage although her men suffered heavy casualties. Drake withdrew to the north-east, with his squadron in line astern of Revenge, and engaged the other Spanish ships nearby as he passed. Frobisher, directly behind him in the English line, stayed with the San Martin at close range and poured cannon shot into her oaken flanks, but failed to take her. Five Spanish ships were lost.

Following this defeat of the Spanish fleet, Revenge was engaged in harassing Spanish shipping and it was Frobisher's flagship in 1590 when he commanded the efforts to intercept Spanish treasure galleons.

== Later life ==
In 1590, Frobisher visited his native Altofts and found himself welcomed in the homes of the peers and landed gentry of Yorkshire county as an honoured guest. He paid particular attention to a daughter of Thomas, 1st Baron Wentworth, Dorothy Wentworth, (1543 – 3 January 1601), recently widowed by the death of her husband, Paul Withypool of Ipswich; sometime before October she became Frobisher's second wife. In November 1591, he purchased from the Queen the leasehold of the manor of Whitwood in Yorkshire for an unstated sum, and of Finningley Grange in Nottinghamshire, which had belonged to the Mattersey Priory, for £949 (equivalent to £283,000 in 2025). Frobisher made Whitwood his chief residence, befitting his new status as a landed proprietor, but found little leisure for country life.

The following year Frobisher took charge of an English fleet sent out to blockade the Spanish coast and rendezvous with the Spanish treasure fleet; it was fitted out by investors including the Queen, the Earl of Cumberland, Sir Walter Raleigh and his brother, and John Hawkins. Raleigh and Cumberland were the principal organisers of the expedition, and on 28 February Raleigh was commissioned to lead it; the Queen, however, was not eager to send her current favourite off to sea, and he, no great lover of sea life and with no experience in the command of fleets, recommended Frobisher take his place. The fleet was divided into two divisions, with Frobisher's squadron patrolling the waters off the coast of Portugal near the Burlings, while Sir John Burgh (Borough) and John Norton's squadrons sailed for the Azores where they captured a rich prize, the Madre de Deus, much to the discomfiture of Frobisher when he learned the news.

In September 1594, Frobisher led a squadron of ships that besieged Morlaix and forced its surrender. The following month he was engaged with the squadron in the siege and relief of Brest, where he received a gunshot wound to his thigh during the Siege of Fort Crozon, a Spanish-held fortress. The surgeon who extracted the ball left the wadding behind and an ensuing infection resulted in his death days later at Plymouth on 22 November. His heart was buried at St Andrew's Church, Plymouth, and his body was then taken to London and buried at St Giles-without-Cripplegate, Fore Street.

== Legacy ==
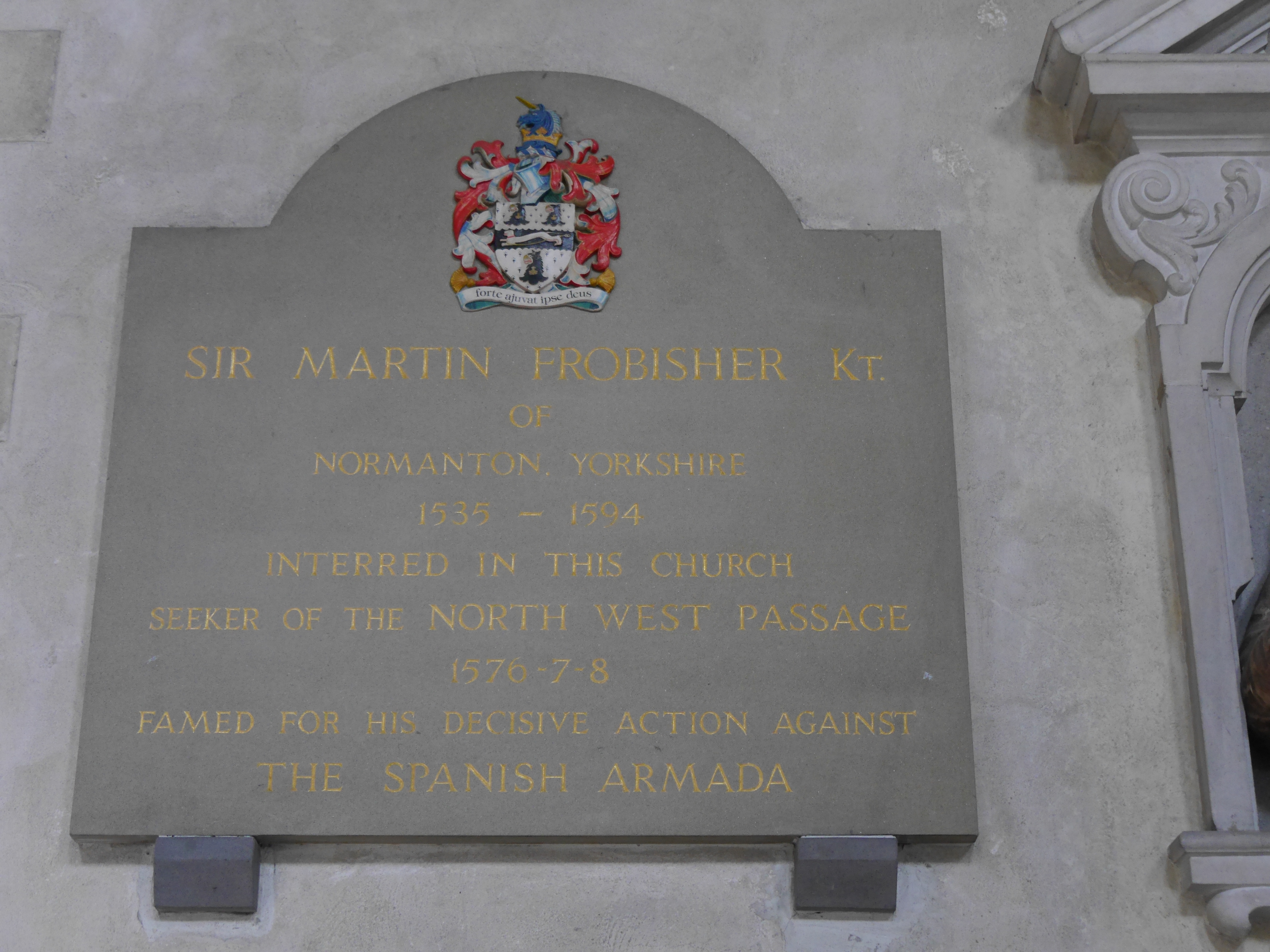
Plaque in St Giles-without-Cripplegate, London

=== Britain ===
Royal Navy ships have been named for Frobisher. A Parker-class flotilla leader destroyer was named HMS Frobisher during construction but was named HMS Parker when launched in 1915. It was scrapped in 1921. The Royal Navy Hawkins-class cruiser HMS Frobisher was named after him. Also ordered in 1915, it was scrapped in 1949. A SR Lord Nelson class steam locomotive was named after him.

Frobisher Crescent, part of the Barbican Estate in London, is named for the explorer and a stained glass window placed in the memory of him is located in All Saints' Church, Normanton, near his birthplace in Altofts, West Yorkshire. Martin Frobisher Infants School in Altofts, City of Wakefield, West Yorkshire also bears his name. One of the six houses at Queen Elizabeths Grammar School, Blackburn (founded 1509) is named after him. One of the four houses at Spratton Hall Preparatory School, Northamptonshire is named after him.

A portrait of him can be found at Normanton railway station. The training Ship Frobisher II, Rochdale Sea Cadets training establishment, is named after him.

=== Canada ===
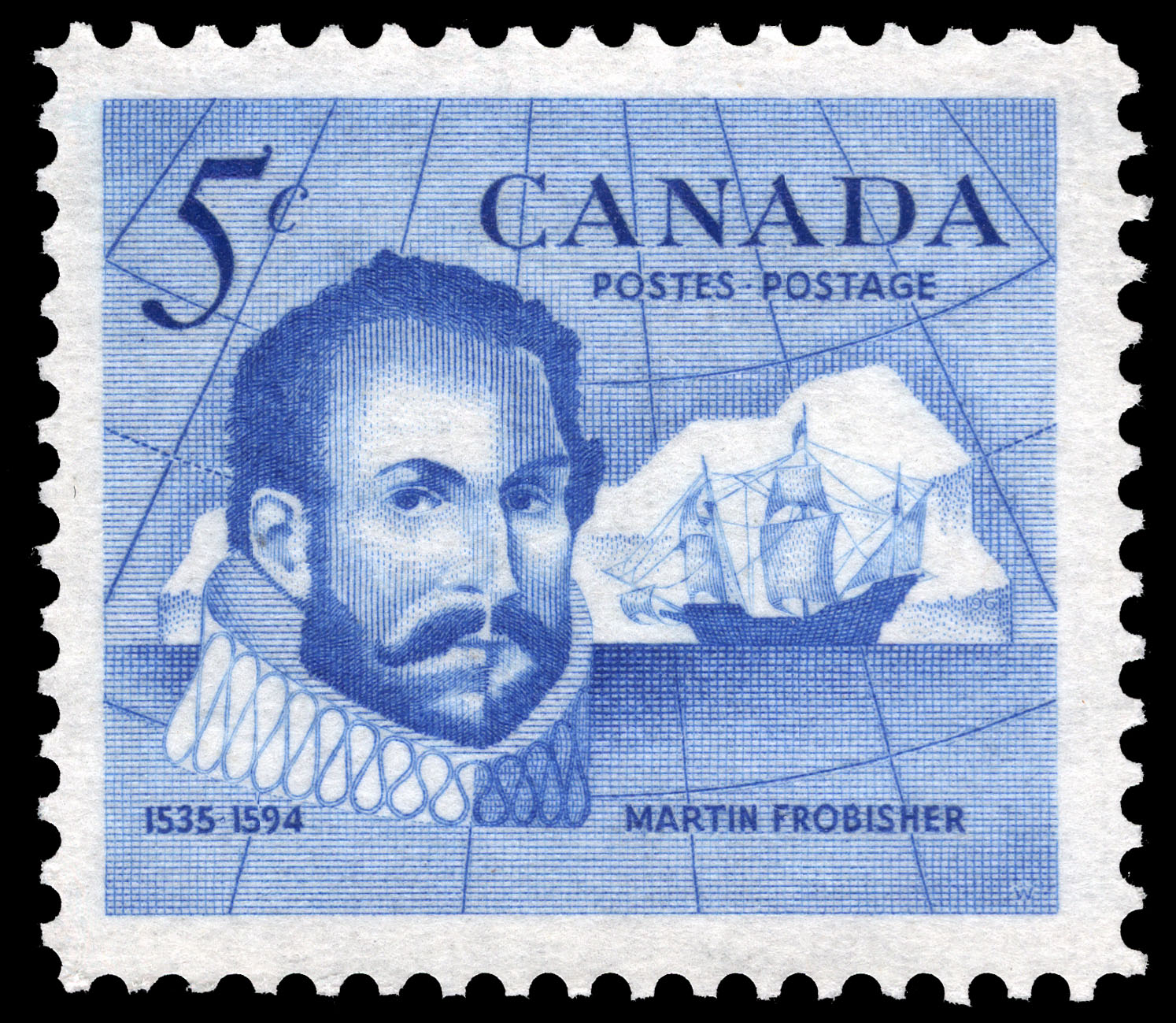
Canadian commemorative postage stamp issued in 1963

Frobisher Bay in Nunavut is named after him. This was also the former name of Nunavut's capital, Iqaluit, from 1942 until 1987. The city's airport was Frobisher Bay Air Base from 1942 to 1963, and Frobisher Bay Airport from 1963 to 1987, before being renamed Iqaluit Airport.

An early version of Thanksgiving was celebrated after the safe landing of Frobisher's fleet in Newfoundland after an unsuccessful attempt to find the North-west Passage.

A shrub rose is named after Martin Frobisher.

The small settlement of Frobisher, Saskatchewan, and Frobisher Lake, in northern and southern Saskatchewan, respectively.

=== In popular culture ===
He is a minor character in The Sea Hawk, where he is played by Robert Warwick.

== See also ==
- Arctic exploration
- List of Arctic expeditions
