= Rose Lok =

English Marian exile (1526–1613)

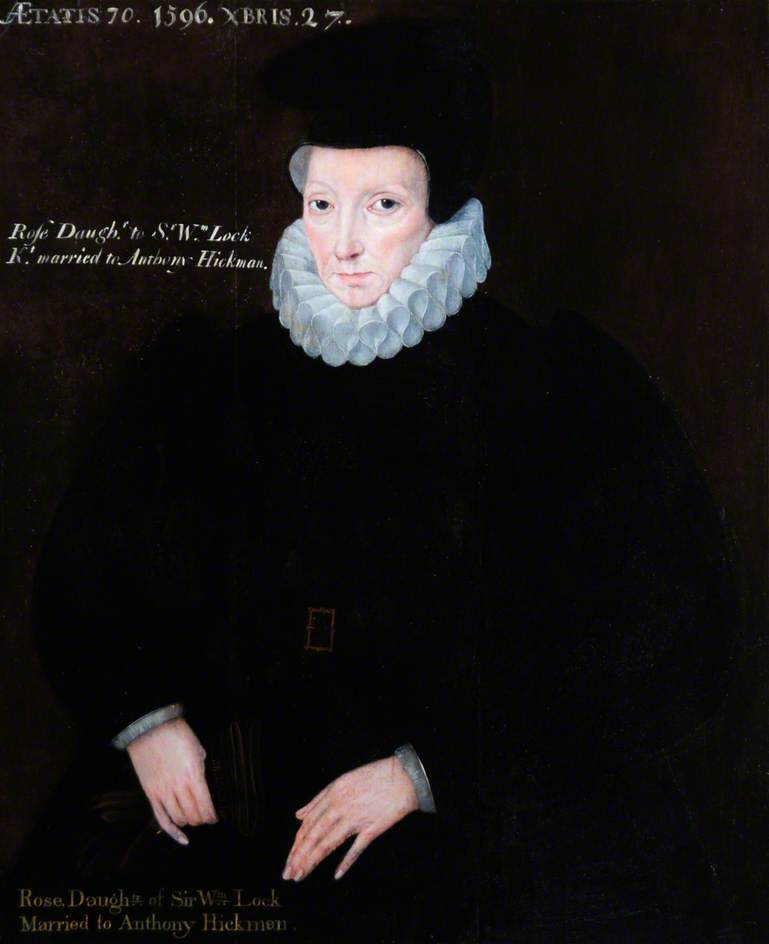
- portrait by follower of John de Critz
- Born: 26 December 1526; London
- Died: 21 November 1613
- Occupations: Businessperson, memoirist
- Spouse(s): Anthony Hickman, Simon Throckmorton
- Children: 9
- Parents: William Lok (father); Catherine Cook (mother)

Rose Lok (26 December 1526 – 21 November 1613) was an English businesswoman and Protestant exile during the Tudor period. At the age of eighty-four, she wrote an account covering the first part of her life.

== Family ==
Rose Lok, born in London on 26 December 1526, was one of the nineteen children of Sir William Lok (1480–1550), gentleman usher to Henry VIII and mercer (cloth merchant), sheriff and alderman of London. Rose and five of her brothers and six of her sisters survived to adulthood, all children of her father's first two marriages.

According to Sutton, Rose Lok's mother was Alice Spenser, the first of Sir William Lok's four wives, who was an early convert to Protestantism. However, according to McDermott, Alice Spenser died in 1522, and Rose Lok's mother was Sir William Lok's second wife, Katherine Cooke (d.1537), daughter of Sir Thomas Cooke of Wiltshire.

Her brothers included Michael Lok, a merchant who invested in the Frobisher expeditions, Henry Lok, father of the poet Henry Lok and John Lok, the sea captain. Among her sisters were Elizabeth Lok (1535–c. 1581), who married firstly a London mercer, Richard Hill, and secondly Nicholas Bullingham, Bishop of Lincoln; and Jane Lok. Her father, Sir William Lok, was the great-great-great-grandfather of the philosopher John Locke (1632–1704).

== Career ==
In 1536, Lok's family lived in Cheapside in London "at the sign of the Padlock". Her father was Sheriff in 1548, and was knighted in that year by the young Edward VI. Sir William Lok and his wife were Protestants, and supported Henry VIII's divorce from Catherine of Aragon. Sir William Lok was the King's mercer, and the King once dined at Lok's London home. According to Sutton, all Sir William Lok's sons were mercers, and it is likely that all his daughters, including Rose, were silkwomen.

In 1610, when she was eighty-four years of age, Rose Lok wrote an account of the first part of her life. In it she told of her parents' activities in furtherance of their Protestant beliefs, including her father's pulling down in 1534 of a copy of the Papal bull excommunicating Henry VIII which had been posted in Dunkirk, of his bringing French translations of the Gospels and Epistles from the continent for Henry VIII's second wife, Anne Boleyn, and of her mother's having read aloud evangelical tracts to Rose and her sisters in secret when they were children.

Rose's mother later died in childbirth. In 1543 Rose married Anthony Hickman, a mercer and merchant adventurer who was in partnership with Rose's eldest brother, Thomas Lok. Hickman and Thomas Lok owned several ships, including the Mary Rose which was named after their respective wives.

Accounts of some of their voyages were included by Richard Hakluyt in his Principal Navigations. Rose and her husband were on terms of friendship with prominent Protestant clergymen, including Bishop John Hooper, the martyrologist John Foxe, and the Scottish Protestant leader, John Knox, who mentioned Rose and her husband in several of his letters written between 1556 and 1561 to Anne Locke, Rose's sister-in-law.

When the Catholic Mary I came to the throne in 1553, Anthony Hickman and Thomas Lok were committed to the Fleet prison for having aided imprisoned Protestants and for having maintained religious heresy. They were later released to house arrest under the supervision of William Paulet, 1st Marquess of Winchester, and eventually freed. Rose's husband then crossed to Antwerp, while Rose went to friends in Oxfordshire, where she gave birth and had her child baptized as a Catholic after having discussed the matter earlier with Bishops Cranmer, Latimer, and Ridley.

After having given birth Rose joined her husband in Antwerp, and while there gave birth to another child whom she had secretly baptised by a Protestant minister. After the death of Queen Mary in November 1558 Rose returned to England, but since her account ends at this point little is known of the remainder of her life apart from the fact that she died on 21 November 1613, aged eighty-six. An epitaph survives from 1637. According to Lowe, although her life was one of devoted Protestantism, "she was also very caught up with business and material concerns, and with the impact of religious changes on her standard of living".

Rose Lok's account of her early life is now held by the British Library as Add MS 43827.

== Marriages and issue ==
Rose Lok married firstly, on 28 November 1543, the London merchant Anthony Hickman (d.1573), son of Walter Hickman of Woodford, Essex, by whom she had at least three sons, William, Henry (MP for Northampton – d.1618) and Walter.

She married secondly Simon Throckmorton (1526?–1585) of Brampton, Huntingdonshire, the third son of Richard Throckmorton of Higham Ferrers by Joan Beaufo, daughter of Humphrey Beaufo of Whilton, Northamptonshire. He was a nephew of Sir George Throckmorton of Coughton Court, and served as a Member of Parliament for Huntingdon in 1554 and again in 1559.
