= John Gwynneth =

Welsh clergyman and musical composer

John Gwynneth (or Guinete) (fl. 1511–1557), was a clergyman of Welsh nationality originating from Gwynedd, and was a composer of religious and liturgical vocal music for which he was awarded a doctorate in the University of Oxford. He held benefices in England in Northamptonshire, Bedfordshire and London, and in North Wales at Clynnog Fawr. Although he was a polemicist for the Catholic faith, he maintained his ministry through the reigns of Henry VIII, Edward VI, and Mary I, and was brother-in-law and executor of Stephen Vaughan (a supporter of the English Reformation). He is principally remembered, from the age of Thomas Tallis, as one of the other exponents of early Tudor period polyphony.

== Young life ==
Origins and education

John Gwynneth was the son of Dafydd ap Llewelyn ap Ithel of Castellmarch, Llanengan, Llŷn, Caernarfonshire: it was claimed that he was of the Welsh royal blood. Anthony à Wood remarks that he had great natural abilities but little or nothing to support him in his studies at Oxford University. He was therefore sponsored by a churchman ("an ecclesiastical Mecænas") who hoped that he would become a useful writer against the opponents of Roman Catholicism. Wood adds that in his youth he was well versed in polite literature, and later familiarized himself with the writings and arguments for and against the doctrines of Luther and Zwingli.

However there is no record that he completed a bachelor's degree. From his declaration to the university made in 1531 (below), it appears that from around 1510 he was active in the composition and theory of polyphonic music. Since he became a secular priest, this experience was perhaps gained in Oxford and then or thereafter as a secular chaplain attached to a religious house possessing a choir, though he did not enter a formal order. In 1522, a clerk, he was owed £18 (an old debt) by the Abbey of St Albans. When still an acolyte he was collated, apparently by the Cluniac priory of St Andrew, Northampton, to the benefice of Stuchbury or Stotesbury (near Sulgrave), Northamptonshire in December 1528, which he held until his death. Stuchbury was attached to the College of All Hallows, Northampton, which had an important medieval choir.

Musical composer

John Gwynneth is particularly noteworthy as an early Tudor composer of music. By December 1531 he had achieved a remarkable output, at which time he made a formal approach to the University of Oxford:

"John Gwynneth a secular priest, who had spent twelve years in the praxis and theory of music, and had composed all the responses of the whole year in division-song, and had published many masses in the said song, supplicated that these his labours might enable him to be admitted to the praxis of music. This being granted conditionally that he compose one mass against the act following, he supplicated again that whereas he had spent 20 years in the praxis and theory of music, and had published three masses of five parts, and five masses of four, as also certain symphonas, antiphonas, and divers songs for the use of the church, he might be admitted to proceed in the faculty of music; which desire of his being granted, conditionally that he pay to the university, on the day of his admission, 20 pence, he was forthwith licensed to proceed."

Thus he was awarded the degree of Doctor of Music. He was one of the composers whose work was included in the collection printed in 1530, called the "Book of XX Songes", of which only the volume of bass lines (Bassus) survives. Thomas Morley, in his Plaine and Easie Introduction to Practicall Musicke (1597), lists "Io. Guinneth" among the English practitioners whose works he has diligently perused, for finding the true use of the Moods.

Family connections

John Gwynneth's sister Margaret was firstly the wife of Edward Awpart (Alporte), citizen and Girdler of London in the parish of St Mary le Bow, who originated from Penkridge in Staffordshire. In 1524 Awpart took the lease on premises called "The Three Leggs" in St Mary le Bow from St Bartholomew's Priory. The Awparts had five children, Elizabeth, Anne, Joan, Edward and Susan, who were all unmarried at the time of their father's death in 1532. By his will dated 24 June 1532 Awpart, who mentions a debt to his hostess at the "Viniarde in Andwarpe", appointed his widow and "Sir" John Gwynneth his executors, making a gift of £6.13s.4d to John, and both were sworn to probate (John in person, Margaret by attorney) on 6 July 1532. In this will Awpart refers to his wife's mother by the name Joan White. He appointed Thomas Marbury, Haberdasher, as Overseer, who in the same year, as executor to John Maltby, ran into difficulties with the Mercers' Company.

Margaret Gwynneth then (by 1533) re-married to Stephen Vaughan, Governor of the Merchant Adventurers (1534) and royal agent and secretary in Antwerp. Vaughan in 1536 assumed the lease on "The Three Leggs", and, following the priory's dissolution, in 1540 it was granted by the Crown to him and Margaret for life, and in remainder to their male issue. Vaughan's sister Mawdlyn was the wife of the London Grocer William Pratt, after whose death in 1539 she married Pratt's well-travelled apprentice Thomas Lodge. Vaughan, who could call upon the help of Thomas Cromwell, found a place at Court for his wife Margaret as silkwoman in service to Anne Boleyn. With him she had further children (Anne, Stephen and Jane), dying in 1544. Marbury died in 1545, leaving John Gwynneth with sole responsibility to administer the Awpart estate.

== Opportunity and controversy ==
Stoke sub Hamdon, and Luton – writing against Frith

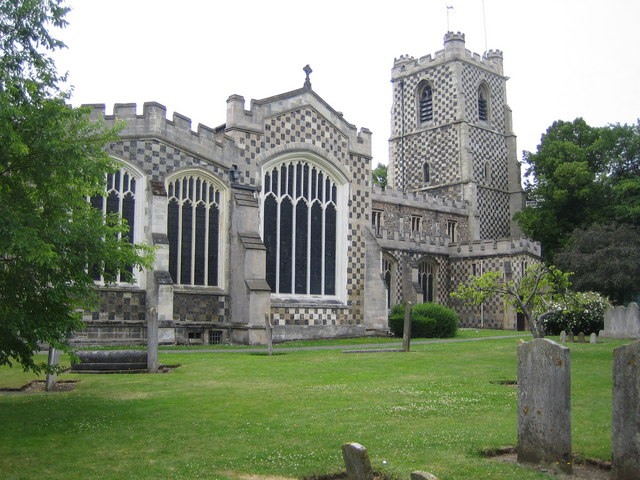
St Mary's church, Luton

The King presented Gwynneth to the collegiate church of Stoke sub Hamdon Priory, Somerset, in September 1534, at the Crown's disposal on the death of John Glyn. He published his first writings against the doctrines of John Frith, as The confutacyon of the fyrst parte of Frythes boke: with a dysputacyon before whether it be possyble for any heretike to know that hym selfe is one or not. And also an other, whether it be wors to denye directely more or lesse of the fayth. This was printed at St Albans in 1536, under the auspices of the last abbot, three years after Frith's execution as a heretic. Gwynneth was presented to the vicariate of Luton, Bedfordshire ("the best preferment in the Abbey of St Albans") by Stephen Vaughan as assignee of Edward Awpart senior by grant of St Albans Abbey, in December 1537, where he continued his ministrations for twenty years, until around 1558.

Clynnog Fawr

In October 1537 Gwynneth was presented by the King to the provostship or rectory sine cura of Clynnog Fawr (in the Llŷn south of Caernarfon), with the chapels and church of Llangeinwen and Llangaffo (Anglesey), upon the death of Dr. William Glyn of Glynllifon. John Capon, Bishop of Bangor (1534–39), would not admit him, instituting instead Gregory Williamson, a child nephew of Thomas Cromwell's, to the living. Arthur Bulkeley, then Prebendary of Clynnog Fechan at Llangeinwen, had been displaced thereby at Cromwell's prompting. Gwynneth brought a writ of quare impedit against Bishop Capon and Williamson, but in 1539 Capon was succeeded by John Bird (1539–41), and in July 1540 Cromwell fell. In October 1540 Archbishop Cranmer granted a dispensation to Gwynneth to occupy the perpetual vicarage of Enstone, Oxfordshire pending its transfer from the Diocese of Lincoln to that of Oxford in 1542.

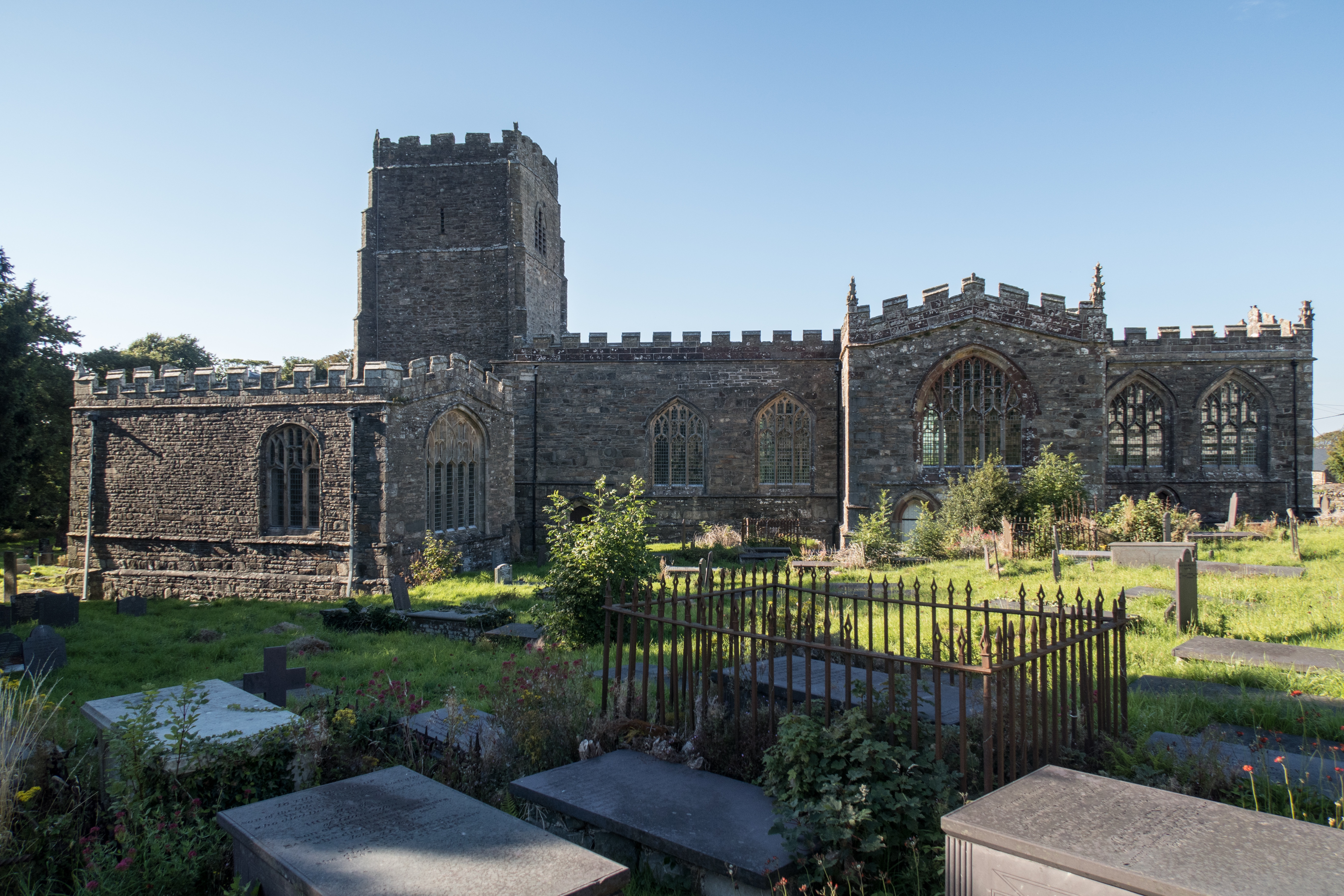
St Beuno's church, Clynnog Fawr

In July 1541 Gwynneth renewed his suit, now against Bird, who however was translated to Chester in August 1541. In October, during the vacancy in the see of Bangor, Gwynneth (described as "Magister", and "sacellanus" or royal chaplain) had himself instituted to Clynnog Fawr by the Commissary of the Archbishop of Canterbury. Arthur Bulkeley became Bishop of Bangor in November 1541, but before he came into residence Gwynneth had obtained a judgement in default. There followed a great controversy between Gwynneth and Bulkeley in the Court of Star Chamber, and in 1543 Gwynneth won judgement in his favour.

Having thus asserted the King's right of patronage over that of the Bishop of Bangor, he then, on 21 January, 36 Henry VIII (1544/45) at St Mary le Bow, demised the Rectory of Clynnog Fawr to Dafydd ap Robert alias Gryffyth of Merthyr, Caernarfonshire, gent., for nine years, he paying John £57.14s.6d for each year that he occupied it. In the following year however, it became likely that the provostship would be subject to Crown resumption under the Act for Chantries. Vaughan appealed to Lord Paget on Gwynneth's behalf, explaining that he had spent 8 years in continual suit and expense in the law over it, at his personal cost of 500 marks.

== Challenge and responsibility ==
St Peter, Westcheap

Meanwhile, on 19 September 1543, at the presentation of Thomas Audley (died 1544), he was instituted by Bishop Bonner to the rectory of St Peter, Westcheap in the city of London (historically a St Albans benefice). The Louvain narrative states that he had formerly been curate there. At St Peter's he followed in the footsteps of Thomas Goodrich and Richard Gwent, both very advanced churchmen. He held this benefice through the reign of Edward VI (possibly with some interruption), and through that of Mary I. During Edward's reign the old Faringdon chantry was done away with, the church fraternity was dissolved, the rood was taken down, the altars were replaced with tables and the paraphernalia of the Catholic ritual were removed from St Peter's.

As the dissolution of the chantries proceeded, in March 1548 Sir Walter Mildmay, one of the two Surveyors-general of the Court of Augmentations, was appointed a commissioner for the sale of chantry lands. Gwynneth's first cousin, John Roberts of Castellmarch, was Sheriff of Caernarvonshire in that year, whose son Griffith ap John (sometime in the service of John Dudley, Earl Warwick) was appointed Constable of Conwy Castle in 1549.

Executor and matchmaker

In October 1548 Gwynneth's niece Joan Awparte, Vaughan's stepdaughter, married Edward Myldemay, elder brother of Sir Walter. The marriage was brief, for Edward, who had become citizen and Mercer in October 1541, made his will on 22 March 1549, in which he gives "to Elizabeth Awparte, sister to my late wife Johanna, £20 which is owing me by my uncle the vicar of Luton." (Possibly this was money owing by Gwynneth upon the marriage settlement, since he, as the surviving executor of Edward Awparte senr, held the portions of the Awparte children until their age of 21 or else were married, a term now elapsing.) Myldemay makes gifts of various of his wife's effects: the will was proved by Sir Walter Mildmay on 3 April 1549.

Stephen Vaughan made Gwynneth his executor at his death in December 1549, leaving him in charge of "The Three Leggs" in Westcheap with a room for his own lodgings and the management of the premises on behalf of Vaughan's daughters for the space of nine years. Vaughan's brother-in-law Thomas Lodge, husband of Mawdlyn (who died in 1548), and John Griffith were his overseers. (Lodge had of late conducted secret surveillance for Vaughan overseas.) Gwynneth swore to probate on 26 February 1549/50. In that connection he had the task of delivering to Sir John Williams some £305 owing to the King from Vaughan's accounts as Under-Treasurer of the Tower Mint.

A notice of Gwynneth's niece Jane Vaughan, written upon family authority in 1632, states that Gwynneth was "a long time kept in prison when heresy came in", and thereafter arranged Jane's marriage to (Thomas) Wiseman, (son of John Wiseman of Felsted, Essex (died 1559/60)): if so this imprisonment may have been in the Edwardian period, as he barely survived into the time of Elizabeth I, and the Wisemans' elder children were born during the 1550s. Vaughan had entrusted to Gwynneth a dower of gold for the use of his children, for which, in 1551–52, they in their own names were obliged to sue the stepmother (now the wife of George Rolle of Stevenstone (d. 1552)) in the years immediately after their father's death: the suit was then continued with Gwynneth's support. At this stage Jane Vaughan was unmarried, but her sister Anne was already married to Henry Locke, son of Sir William Lok.

== Vindication ==
Marian apologist

The accession of Queen Mary I and the aftermath of Wyatt's rebellion restored Gwynneth's doctrine. Gwynneth was at Luton on 23 July 1553 to deliver his sermon celebrating the return of a Catholic monarch, in which he did not fail to find a parallel in Mary's name with the cult of Mary, mother of Jesus so favoured in Tudor Catholicism (and so repudiated by the Edwardian Reformists). It was soon published by John Cawood and found a ready circulation. In April 1554 outside his church door in London, at the Cheapside Cross, the popular mood was expressed by the spectacle of a cat hanged on a scaffold, robed like a priest with its head shaved, its bound paws holding up a morsel representing the Sacrament.

From the London press of Thomas Berthelet Gwynneth renewed his writings against Frith in enlarged editions, with A manifeste detection of the notable falshed of that part of Iohn Frithes boke whiche he calleth his foundacion, and A Declaration of the State wherein all Heretickes dooe leade their lives; and also of their continuall indever and propre fruictes, in 1554. The title page of the latter bore the text: "There is a waie, which semeth to a man streight, and yet the endes therof leaden to perdicion" (Proverbs, 16:25). The lease of nine years having expired, he brought action for a debt of £67.14s.6d against Dafydd Gryffyth owing for Clynnog Fawr, and against various persons for tithes in Caernarfon and Anglesey. Its chantry lands had passed into Crown hands.

Restitutions

In 1555 there was a concerted effort to restore the fittings of St Peter's in Westcheap. Brick and stone altars were instated and re-dedicated, a new rood with St Mary and St John forming a Stabat Mater was acquired, and Father Howe was brought in to repair the organs with new springs and new tongues for the principals in the bass regals. The Easter Sepulchre was repaired, and a vigil was kept. In his writings Gwynneth deplored the reformists' removal of the altar tables out of the chancel into the body of the church: masonry altars made this more difficult. The charges for the hallowing of the altars are itemized in the St Peter's accounts, including the small sum of 4d for a pound of frankincense. The 1556 accounts show the acquisition of a book of homilies, three large Processionals, three "greylls", an Antiphonary, and a Legendary, all very useful and necessary for the performance of the Roman ritual.

In Luton in 1545 Gwynneth had acted as overseer in the will of Edward Crawley, one of his churchwardens. Crawley, with the consent of the parish, had sold off a silver pax, a silver-gilt pyx, and two double-gilt chalices belonging to the church for £15, which was to be "ymployed about the new makynge of an ile of the churche". This came to light in the Edwardian inventory of church goods, whereupon Crawley's brother took responsibility. In March 1556 the commissioners made a discretionary allowance of £8.6s.8d towards the repairs, on condition that Crawley spend the remainder on church ornaments by Midsummer, for which Gwynneth gave an undertaking to the Bishop of Ely. On 10 June he was able to report to the commissioners (William Berners, Thomas Mildmay and John Wiseman) that Crawley (at his own expense) had spent £5 on a cope and vestment of blue velvet and more than 20 nobles on a chalice.

== Last stand ==
Vaughan's widow, having made a further marriage to Sir Leonard Chamberlayne of Woodstock, with him brought suit against Gwynneth claiming that he had withheld her share of Vaughan's estate. The parties agreed to arbitration, which found that Gwynneth, as executor, owed a further £500 over and above £500 which Dame Margery had already received. This was then reduced to £400 by taking into account £100 which she and George Rolle had taken upon a bond from the children's portions deposited for them by Gwynneth in the Chamber of London, and which had not been repaid. Gwynneth made a payment and was granted his release or acquittance by the arbitrators.

Chamberlayne, however, pressed his bill, and Gwynneth then brought the matter to a perfect issue. He objected that Rolle's bond was nothing to do with Chamberlayne's suit, had not been mentioned in arbitration, and was never a subject of dispute. He revealed and proved that he had paid the full £500 before receiving his acquittance. He thereby exonerated himself from any possible imputation that he had used the children's money to discharge what he owed to Dame Margery. Her obligation, on the other hand, still remained. By a final and definitive sentence in Chancery on 4 November 1556 he was completely discharged and awarded costs, and Chamberlayne's bill was dismissed.

Gwynneth resigned from St Peter's, Westcheap before 19 November 1556, when his successor, Richard Smith, was presented by George Keynsham and George Wiseman under a concessionary advowson remaining from St Alban's Abbey, and instituted by Bonner. His last publication A playne demonstration of Iohn Frithes lacke of witte and learnynge in his vnderstandynge of holie scripture and of the olde holy doctours, in the blessed sacrament of the aulter, printed by Thomas Powell in London, appeared in 1557. His theological dialogues have been described as "excruciatingly pedantic".

Death

Gwynneth appears to have died around the end of Mary I's reign: the death is placed before 1 December 1558 in Episcopal Registers. He is described as deceased ("defunctus") in Hilary term 1558/59, when his administrators and next of kin ("proximi consanguinei"), his nephew Edward Awpart (jr) and his niece Elizabeth Awpart, wife of George Keynsham of Tempsford, Bedfordshire, pressed a claim for debt of £40 against Sir Thomas Rotherham of Someries, Luton. At Stuchbury his successor Laurence Washington entered the living (vacant by his death) in May 1559.

Two factors have been taken to suggest that he survived into the reign of Elizabeth I. One is the story of his imprisonment: the other is the late record of a suit brought in his name before the Star Chamber for the recovery of the possessions of "the late Dr Glyn" at Clynnog Fawr in Llanwnda and Llanfaglan. If this refers to Dr William Glyn of Glynllifon, Gwynneth's predecessor at Clynnog Fawr (who died in 1537), the grounds of the suit need not post-date the death (in 1558) of the more famous Dr William Glyn, Bishop of Bangor.

== Nephews and nieces ==
As executor, Gwynneth had responsibility for the estates of the children of the two marriages of his sister Margaret Gwynneth (also called Margery), who died in 1544. By her first marriage, to Edward Awpart, Girdler of London (died 1532), her children were:

- Elizabeth Awpart, married (by Easter term 1557) George Keynsham of Bygrave, Hertfordshire and Tempsford, Bedfordshire (died 1593).
- Ann Awpart, living 1532.
- Joan Awpart, married Edward Mildmay (elder brother of Sir Walter Mildmay) in 1548. Both died in 1548–1549.
- Edward Awpart, one of the signatories to the testimonial provided by the English Hospice in Rome for Thomas Sackville at the time of his visit to Rome in 1564. In 1572 Sir Thomas Ragland raised a mortgage on lands in Glamorganshire from George Keynsham and Edward Alporte, which led to a suit in Chancery between Ragland and Keynsham in 1578.
- Susan Awpart, living 1532.

By her second marriage, 1532–33, to Stephen Vaughan (died 1549), her children were:

- Anne Vaughan (1534 – c. 1590), poet, married (1: c. 1549) Henry Lock (a younger son of Sir William Lok), who died in 1571; (2: 1572) Edward Dering (died 1576); (3: 1576) Richard Prowse of Exeter. She was the author of A Meditation of a Penitent Sinner (1560).
- Stephen Vaughan (b. 1537 – will proved 1605), entered Gonville Hall, Cambridge, 1554; Inner Temple, 1564. He married Jane, daughter of Richard Stroud (Strode), of (Old) Newnham, Devon. Stephen was an overseer in the will of George Keynsham, 1593. They had three daughters and three sons, of whom the eldest, Stephen, was considered insane, having been "corrupted in religion". The youngest son, Rowland Vaughan, inherited.
- Jane Vaughan (died c. 1610), recusant, married (by c. 1555) Thomas Wiseman, son of John Wiseman of Felsted. They had several children, including four sons (the heir being Sir William Wiseman), and four daughters of whom two became Abbess and Prioress of the Bridgettine house at Lisbon, and two were nuns at St Ursula's of Louvain. Jane was imprisoned and condemned for recusancy, but the sentence against her was remitted.

== Works ==
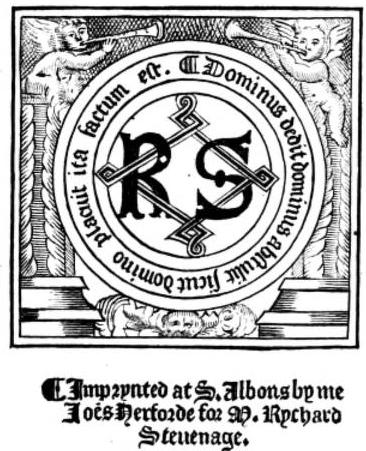
Printer's mark from Gwynneth's "Confutacyon" of 1536.

His works are:

- 'My Love mourneth,' music and words in a book, Bassus, beginning "In this boke are conteynyd xx songes", 1530, obl. 4to.
- The confutacyon of the fyrst parte of Frythes boke, with a disputacyon before, whether it be possyble for any heretike to know that hymselfe is one or not, And also another, whether it be wors to denye directely more or lesse of the fayth, St. Albans, 1536, 16mo.
- A brief Declaration of the notable Victory given of God to oure soueraygne lady, quene Marye, made in the church of Luton, 23 July, in the first yere of her gracious reign, London [1554], 16mo.
- A Declaration of the State wherein all Heretickes dooe leade their lives; and also of their continuall indever and propre fruictes, which beginneth in the 38 Chapiter, and so to thende of the Woorke, London, 1554, 4to.
- A Manifeste Detection of the notable falshed of that Part of Frythes boke which he termeth his Foundation, and bosteth it to be invincible, 2nd edition, London, 1554, 8vo.
- A Playne Demonstration of John Frithes lacke of witte and learnynge in his understandynge of holie Scripture, and of the olde holy doctours, in the Blessed Sacrament of the Aulter, newly set foorthe, London, 1557, 4to, written in the form of a dialogue.
