= Stephen Vaughan (merchant) =

English merchant and diplomat (1502–1549)

Stephen Vaughan (1502–1549) was an English merchant, royal agent and diplomat, and supporter of the Protestant Reformation.

== Life ==
Vaughan was a merchant of London. About 1520 he made the acquaintance of Thomas Cromwell, and in March 1523-4 he was in Cromwell's service. Through Cromwell's influence he was employed by Cardinal Wolsey on the business of Cardinal College. He was still mainly occupied with commerce, and was a member of the Company of Merchant Adventurers of London. He frequently visited Antwerp, and was entrusted with commissions on behalf of Cromwell and of Henry VIII, and about 1530 became royal agent or king's factor in the Netherlands. His principal duty was to negotiate loans with the Fuggers, on commission.

John Hutton, governor of the Merchant Adventurers' Company, in 1529 instigated charges of heresy against Vaughan before William Warham, the Archbishop of Canterbury and Sir Thomas More. The influence of Cromwell protected Vaughan, but More continued to seek evidence against him, and succeeded in turning George Constantine to use, and the matter was raised again in 1532. Meanwhile, in 1531 Henry VIII asked Vaughan to persuade William Tyndale to retract his heretical opinions and return to England. Vaughan had various ineffectual interviews with Tyndale, and forwarded early copies of his books to the king. His efforts did not satisfy Henry VIII, who thought Vaughan too sympathetic towards Tyndale, though Cromwell said otherwise. Vaughan also interceded in Hugh Latimer's favour when he was cited before convocation in January 1532, and reacted by writing a protest against Henry's persecution of reformers. He weathered this storm over his Protestant views. On Hutton's death about 1534 Vaughan succeeded him as governor of the Merchant Adventurers' Company. He also became, in succession to Sir John Hackett, president of the factory of English merchants at Antwerp, residing in what was called 'the English House'. On 10 April 1534 he was appointed a clerk in chancery, an office which did not prevent his residence at Antwerp, and was on 6 August 1534 appointed to a salaried royal secretarial position.

In December 1532 Vaughan was sent on a mission to Paris and Lyons, and in August following accompanied Christopher Mont on his tour through Germany to report on the political situation; after visiting Nuremberg, Cologne, and Saxony, he returned to Antwerp in December, where he sought to effect the capture of William Peto. In January 1536 he was in England, and was sent to watch over Eustace Chapuys during his interview with Katherine of Aragon, at Kimbolton, shortly before her death. That summer, when again at Antwerp, he made vain efforts to save Tyndale, who was executed. Soon afterwards he was given a position in the Royal mint, of which he became under-treasurer in 1544. In 1538 he was sent with Thomas Wriothesley and Sir Edward Carne to negotiate respecting the intended marriage of Henry VIII with the Duchess-consort of Milan. About the same time he became governor of the merchant adventurers of Bergen, and in 1541 he was sent with Carne to the regent of Flanders to procure the repeal of the restrictions on English commerce. In 1544 he was granted the clerkship of dispensations, and about the same time the priory of St. Mary Spital, Shoreditch. He retained his post as agent in the Netherlands until September 1546, when he returned to England and occupied himself with his business as under-treasurer of the mint. On 26 October 1547 he was returned to parliament for Lancaster.

Vaughan died in London on 25 December 1549. His Inquisition post mortem was held at the Guildhall, London before Sir Rowland Hill in June 1550.

== Family ==
Vaughan's sister Magdalen or Mawdlyn was married first to the citizen and Grocer William Pratt (stepson of Sir Christopher Askewe, Draper, Lord Mayor 1533–34), who died in 1539. She then married (as his first wife) Pratt's apprentice Thomas Lodge (Lord Mayor 1562–63), who (by a later wife) was father of the poet-physician Thomas Lodge. Mawdlyn died in 1548, and in 1549 Stephen Vaughan made his "trustie friend" Thomas Lodge one of the two overseers of his will: the other was John Griffith alias Vaughan, the King's clerk.

Vaughan was twice married. His first wife was Margaret ("Margery") Gwynneth or Guinet, daughter of Dafydd ap Llewelyn ap Ithel of Castellmarch (Abersoch), Llŷn, Caernarfonshire. At her marriage to Vaughan she was the widow of Edward Awpart, citizen and Girdler of London in the parish of St. Mary le Bow, who originated from Penkridge in Staffordshire and died in London in 1532 leaving Margaret with five children. Her brother John Gwynneth, rector of St Peter, Westcheap, was Vaughan's executor. Margaret or Margery Guinet was a silkwoman to Anne Boleyn, Anne of Cleves, and Katherine Parr, and as the wife of Stephen Vaughan she was known as "Mistress Vaughan". By Margaret "Margery", who died in 1544, Vaughan had three surviving children:

- Anne Vaughan, married Henry, a younger son of Sir William Lok: Anne was a poet, and they were the parents of the poet Henry Lok.
- Stephen Vaughan (born 4 October 1537), who inherited his father's property (consisting of twelve tenements in St. Mary Spital, Shoreditch, three in Watling Street, All Saints, one in St. Benedict's, and one in Westcheap).
- Jane Vaughan, married a member of the Wiseman family, of Braddocks, Wimbish, Essex.

Vaughan married secondly to Margery, widow of Henry Brinkelow. The second marriage was licensed on 27 April 1546, and apparently took place at Calais, in the chapel of the lord-deputy, George Brooke, 9th Baron Cobham. Margery had a son John Brinkelow, but no issue by Vaughan. After Vaughan's death his widow remarried (c. 1550) to George Rolle, Esq., of Stevenstone, Devon (d. 1552), and again (before 1556) to Sir Leonard Chamberlain of Woodstock, Oxfordshire.
