= Jane Wilkinson =

Jane Wilkinson may refer to:

- Jane Herbert Wilkinson, Texas pioneer
- Jane Wilkinson (Protestant), lady-in-waiting to Anne Boleyn and religious exile under Mary I
- Jane Wilkinson, a character in the film Thirteen at Dinner
- Jane Wilkinson, a character in Lord Edgware Dies
