= Silkwoman =

Female trader in silk and other fine fabrics

A silkwoman was a woman in medieval, Tudor, and Stuart England who traded in silks and other fine fabrics. London silkwomen held some trading rights independently from their husbands and were exempted from some of the usual customs and laws of coverture. The trade and craft of the silkwoman was encouraged by a statute of Henry VI of England as a countermeasure to imports of silk thread, and a suitable occupation for "young gentlewomen and other apprentices".

== Silkwomen in London ==
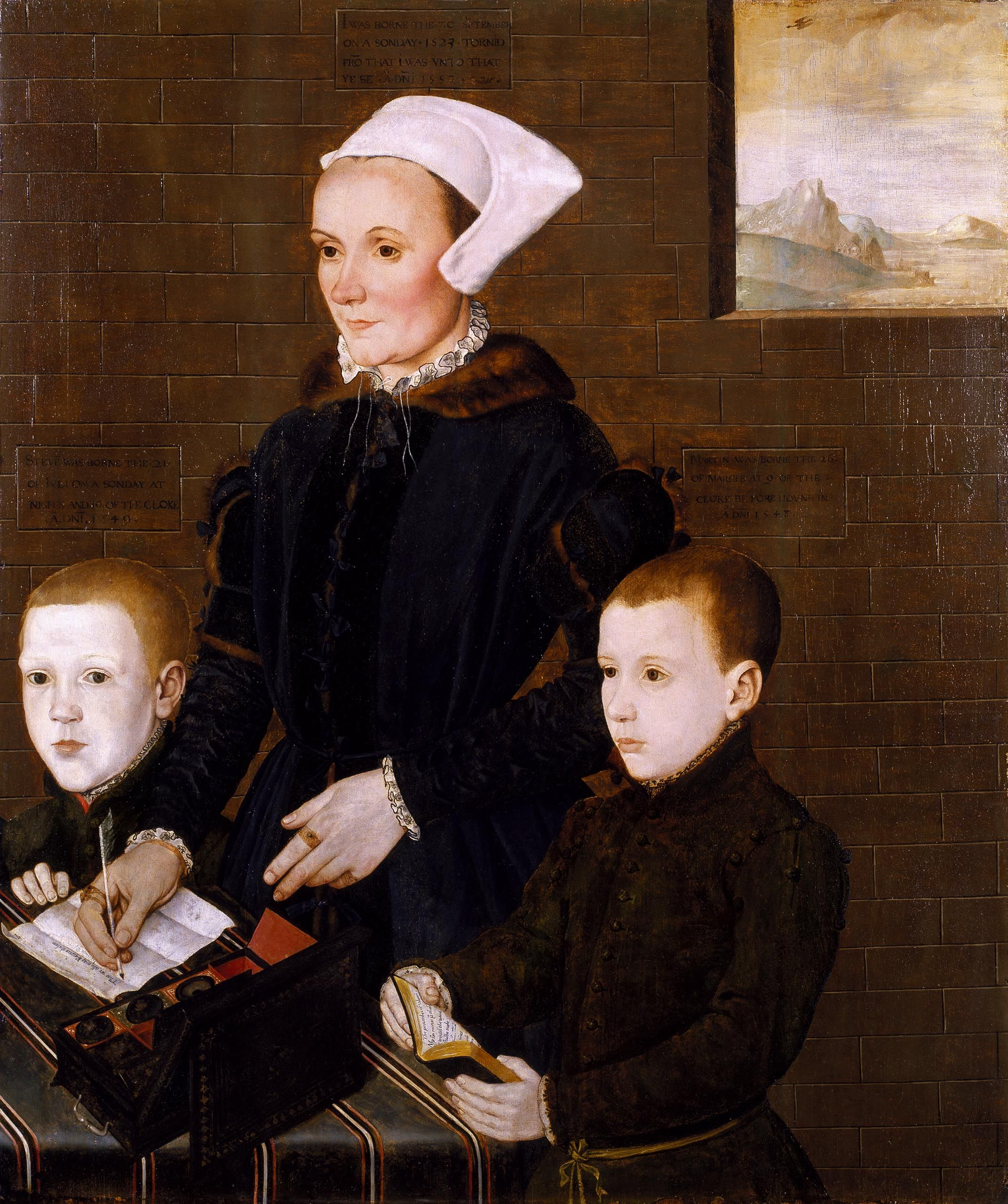
Alice Barnham Bradbridge and her sons (c.1557), Denver Art Museum

In 1421 Alice Corsmaker paid 6s-8d to the Mercer's Company of London to trade as a silkwoman. Alice Bradbridge was recognised as a "sister" of the Worshipful Company of Drapers.

Silkwomen in London manufactured silk thread from raw silk imported from Italy, wove and sold ribbons, braids, cord, girdles, and trimmings, called "narrow ware", and made other silk goods. In the Elizabeth period, silkwomen also provided linen goods including lawn sleeves and partlets.

== Silkwomen supplying the royal wardrobe ==
Emmot Norton and Matilde Dentorte were London silkwomen supplying the wardrobe of Joan of Navarre, queen consort of Henry IV of England with silk thread, cord, gilt silk ribbons or bands, and latten rings and fixings, in 1420, when she was a prisoner at Leeds Castle. Four other women sold cloth for her gowns.

Anne Claver (died 1489) was a silkwoman to Edward IV. She supplied silk thread for sewing or embroidery, ribbons, a mantle of blue silk lace, and wove silk thread into laces and tassels to be applied to bookbindings. She made a silk fringe in yellow, green, red, white, and blue. She may have supplied five counterpoints for covering beds, with imagery, scripture, and verdure, and four "costerings" or wallhangings chequered in red and blue with roses, suns, and crowns. She made tufts of silk to decorate the coronation gloves of Richard III, and buttons for his and Anne Neville's robes.

Cecily Walcot worked on furnishings and decorations for the coronation of Henry VII in October 1485. Walcot provided fringes of gold and silk thread for the royal canopy. Kateryn Champyon alias Claver made ribbons for the king's girdles, and Kateryn Walshe supplied fringes and ribbon, some in the green and white Tudor colours. Agnes Dey or Sey and Alice Claver provided red ribbons.

Elizabeth Langton (whose mother-in-law Jane Langton was also a silkwoman) , Elizabeth Lock, Jane Lock, Margaret Ashley, and Elizabeth Worssop supplied the royal wardrobe in the years 1498 to 1511. Elizabeth Lock or Lokke supplied frontlets and hoods for the gable hoods worn by Elizabeth of York. She provided black velvet hoods for Lady Catherine Gordon, the widow of Perkin Warbeck, in October 1498 and in March 1499, and a crimson velvet bonnet in 1502, and in November 1498 and April 1499 black velvet bonnets with a gold border and partlets for Lady Anne Percy, one of the gentlewomen attending Elizabeth of York. Jane Lock made a crimson velvet bonnet for Catherine Gordon in 1503 and two velvet frontlets. Elizabeth Worssop made gold fringes for hose worn by Henry VII in 1510. in November 1510 Margaret Ashley supplied coloured ribbons and sarcenet silk fabric in several colours for tippets worn by Mary Tudor, then known as the "Princess of Castile".

=== Joan Wilkinson and Mistress Vaughan ===
Joan or Jane Wilkinson provided silks for Anne Boleyn. George Wyatt mentioned that Anne and her gentlewomen practised embroidery and made shirts for the poor. After Anne Boleyn's arrest, her chaplain William Latymer forwarded books that he had bought for her to Wilkinson.

Margaret or Margery Guinet (died 1544), mother of Anne Locke, was a silkwoman to Anne Boleyn, Anne of Cleves, and Katherine Parr, as the wife of Stephen Vaughan (merchant and MP) she was known as "Mistress Vaughan". Vaughan recommended her work to Thomas Cromwell, claiming that she had already devised certain works for Anne Boleyn but that they had been forwarded to her. Mistress Vaughan supplied crimson silk fringes for a close stool and tawny satin and ribbon to line a coffer made for the Lady Mary by William Green in August 1537. She provided supplies for saddlery for Anne of Cleves. Katherine Parr did not pay very promptly and her husband pursued the debts. Vaughan's second wife was also called Margery Vaughan. She was the widow of Henry Brinklow. After Stephen Vaughan's death, she married George Rolle (died 1552), and subsequently Leonard Chamberlain.

Mistress Addington was Anne of Cleve's silkwoman in 1539. After the death of Margery Vaughan, Katherine Parr bought from the silkwoman Mistress Anne Shakerley, the wife of the mercer Rowland Shakerley. In Scotland, Helen Ross worked for James V and Regent Arran in the 1530s and 1540s, she made trimmings for books, costume, and armour.

== Silkwomen to Mary I, Elizabeth I, and Anne of Denmark ==
Marie Wilkinson was a silkwoman to Mary I of England, and was paid £200 in September 1553 by order of the Privy Council probably for works for Mary's coronation. She gave Queen Mary a "fair purse" as a New Year's Day gift in 1557. Wilkinson supplied Spanish lace, made clothes and shoes for Jane Foole, and provided materials to the Queen's French-born embroiderer, Guillaume Brellant or Brallot, (who had come to London from Normandy by May 1524 and worked with the English embroiderers William Ibgrave and Stephen Humble), for a rich litter of black velvet. Mrs Baull or Ball and Mrs Malrye provided "silkwomen's stuff" for saddles.

While Princess Elizabeth was at Hatfield House in 1551, Elizabeth Slannyng brought her velvet and silks. Alice Smythe and Alice Montague served the royal wardrobe and Elizabeth I as queen. Montague supplied "bone lace wrought with silver and spangles" in June 1572 and Mrs Swegoo, perhaps a "tirewoman", worked on head dresses for actors in The Masque of Discord and Peace.

=== Alice Montague and the clothes of Elizabeth I ===
Alice Montague was paid for hemming and edging Elizabeth's partlets, and starching the queen's sleeves and ruffs. She was paid for blackwork embroidery on the queen's smocks and collars. In 1564, Alice Montague supplied plain Holland linen for the use of Elizabeth's laundry woman or laundress, "24 elles of holland for oure Laundresse to drie our Partelettes'. Montague employed a woman "in altering and translating" the queen's partlets. Montague gave the Queen a partlet of fine cambric wrought with flowers of black silk as a New Year's Day gift for 1579, and a smock of fine Holland cloth (linen) fair wrought with black silk in 1589.

According to the chronicle of Edmund Howes, in 1561 Montague gave Elizabeth her first pair of silk stockings as a New Year's Day gift. In 1562, Montague provided a pewter metal doll for Aura Soltana, a Russian girl at Elizabeth's court. The doll was given to Kat Ashley suggesting that she looked after Aura Soltana.

In the 1560s Montague was owed £702 by John Tamworth, a keeper of the Queen's privy purse. Tamworth reimbursed other suppliers and makers including the embroiderers David Smyth and William Middleton, Henry Herne the hosier, Garret Jonson the shoemaker, Raphael Hammond the capper, and paid for gold lace supplied to the tailor Walter Fyshe.

Alice Montague provided Spanish "Granado" sewing and stitching silk thread and Spanish silk ribbon. She also made and provided lace and fringes for the linings and cushions of the coaches used by Elizabeth. The fabrics were embroidered by David Smyth.

=== Dorothy Speckard ===
Dorothy Speckard was Elizabeth's silkwoman from 1601. She washed and mended one the queen's favourite riding outfits, a safeguard and jupe embroidered with stars of Venice silver and gold wheat ears. Dorothy Speckard continued to work for Anne of Denmark.

=== Esther Le Tellier ===
Another silkwoman serving Anne of Denmark in London was the French-born Esther or Hester Le Tellier née Granges, who is thought to have been the aunt of the miniature painter David des Granges. Her husband Elias Le Tellier and James Le Tellier had worked as goldsmiths for Anne of Denmark and James VI with Samson des Granges in Scotland. In 1603, after the Union of the Crowns, she delivered "diverse parcels of lawn, cambric, needlework, purls, bone lace" and other materials to the lady in waiting Jane Drummond. She had an annual salary of £20 in 1606. In London, around 1613, the Le Telliers lived in Charing Cross.
