= Jane Langton (silk merchant) =

Jane Langton was a 15th-century English silkwoman based in London.

The widow of a saddler, Langton bought silk with Genoese merchants, in one transaction paying £300 15s. for silk in the place of her daughter-in-law Agnes, who had recently died. In her 1475 will Langton calls herself a 'silkwoman'.

Langton's daughter-in-law Elizabeth Langton supplied the royal family with silk goods amounting to over £100 in 1503.
