= Guillaume Brellant =

Guillaume Brellant, or Brallot, or Brayllont was a French embroiderer employed at the English royal court in the 16th century. Some English records call him "William Brellout".

== Career ==
Brellant came to London from Normandy in May 1524. He was licensed to establish a workshop and employ foreign craftsmen and apprentices in November 1531. He worked for Henry VIII with the embroiderers William Ibgrave and Stephen Humble. The three embroiderers worked for Anne Boleyn. In 1543, his workshop supplied embroidered pairs of crosses and roses, highlighted with spangles, for the uniforms of soldiers and the royal guard. Spangles and oes were a kind of sequin.

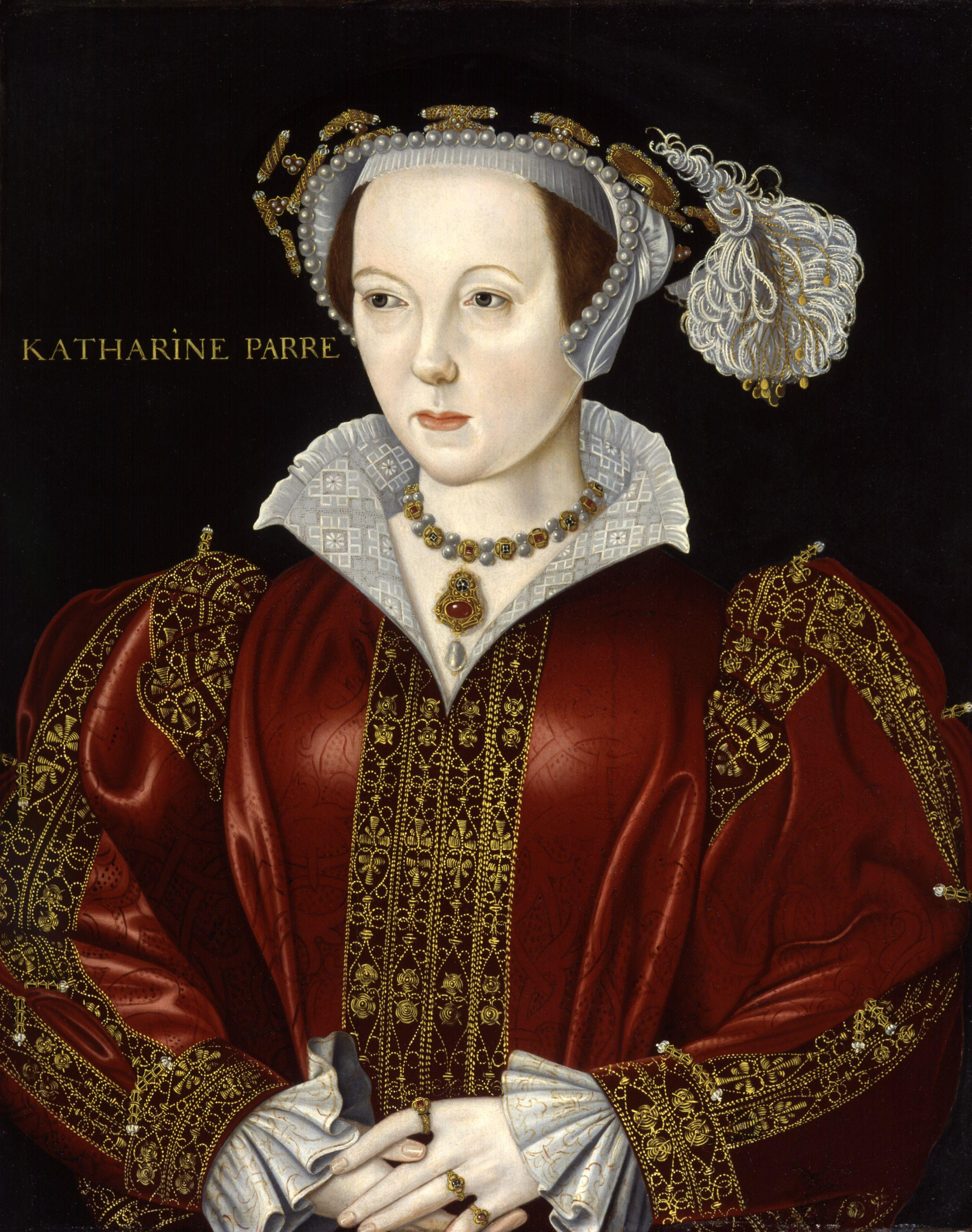
Catherine Parr

Brellant embroidered panels for chair which Princess Mary gave to Henry VIII in 1544 as a New Year's Day gift. He was paid £18 in February. The embroidered panels were mounted by the cabinetmaker William Green and the finished item was taken to Hampton Court.

In 1547, Catherine Parr commissioned him to make hangings for her chapel, depicting the Crucifixion and the Assumption. Brellant and Ibgrave worked on costume for the coronation of Edward VI. Brellant embroidered a gown, a doublet, and hose with "pirls" of damask gold and silver.

His daughter Philippa married a courtier Andrew Baynton of Bromham (died 1579). His father, Edward Bayntun, was the vice-chamberlain of the household of Catherine Parr.

Brellant was appointed embroiderer to Queen Mary I by warrant in August 1553. An inventory of her jewels (British Library Harley 7376) records that pearls were delivered to him to embroider her costume. With William Ibgrave, he embroidered the coats of the guard and footmen with gilt spangles supplied by the goldsmith Peter Richardson. Brellant was supplied materials by Marie Wilkinson, one of the Queen's silkwomen, while working on a litter for the Queen. Brellant was also involved in the preparations for the coronation of Elizabeth I, embroidering items with gilt spangles.

== London properties ==
Brellant had a property adjacent to the Inner Temple in 1547. His yard was used as a thoroughfare and to prevent this becoming a nuisance his garden was extended and a new brick wall was built. In May 1562, he sold a tenement building and sometime brewery called the "Star and Ram" on Fleet Street in the parish of St Dunstan-in-the-West to a draper Henry Wright, reserving a shop and chamber to himself.

== David Smith, William Middleton, and John Parr ==
Brellant held the offices of embroiderer to Mary and Philip, embroiderer to the household and stable, and embroiderer to chapel and vestibule. As he retired, these offices were given to David Smith and William Middleton in February 1563. Some payments to Smith and Middleton were made by John Tamworth, a keeper of Elizabeth's privy purse. Smith's work at the embroidery frame from 1563 onwards is well documented in Elizabeth's wardrobe records. Smith embroidered the queen's gowns and Middleton worked on furnishings including bed hangings.

David Smith also worked for Robert Dudley, 1st Earl of Leicester, embroidering pearls on his costumes for state occasions. Smith become wealthy and by his will in 1587 endowed a hospital and almshouse for six poor widows at St Peter's Hill in Castle Baynard ward. An account of the six almshouses founded by "D. S. embroderer" with the rules for the occupants was included in Holinshed's Chronicle. His daughters Mary Paradine and Anne Chamberlain contributed to the foundation, which was known as "Smith's Almshouses" or the "Widow's Inn". Smith himself suggested the names "Poor Widow's Alley or Poor Widow's Inn". His will mentions another embroiderer John Parr (died 1607) as a business associate who would manage some legacies to Smith's family. Parr, who embroidered a dress for Bess of Hardwick intended as a New Year's Day gift, set up a charity in the parish of St Benet's, Paul's Wharf which contributed an income to the Widow's Inn.
