= Peter Symonds =

English merchant (c.1528–1586/87)

- Born: c. 1528; Winchester, England
- Died: c. 1586/7
- Occupation: Mercer
- Known for: Peter Symonds College

Peter Symonds (c. 1528–1586/87) was a wealthy English merchant and benefactor, most notable for founding a number of almshouses for charitable endeavors in Southeast England. His most prominent achievement was the foundation of an almshouse in Winchester which was later recommissioned into Peter Symonds College.

== Family background ==
Symonds was born in Winchester, the son of the city's bailiff John Symonds and his wife Joan. His family was an influential one, and two of his three brothers became prosperous. John became bailiff of the city in 1565–1567, and again in 1580; William became a wealthy clothier and mayor of Winchester in 1575, 1585 and 1596. As for Peter, he was sent to London in 1542 or 1543, where he served as an apprentice to William Wilkinson, a London sheriff and alderman, and continued in the service of his widow, Joan, after Wilkinson's death in 1543. The Wilkinson household was deeply Protestant, and Joan, a former silkwoman in Anne Boleyn's household, was known to figures such as Bishop John Hooper and the Protestant bishops who were imprisoned during the reign of the Catholic Queen Mary. Former Archbishop of Canterbury Thomas Cranmer advised her to flee abroad, which she did after his execution in the 1550s. She died in 1556; among her bequests was £6 13s. 4d. (about £1,135 in today's money) to Symonds in London.

== Career ==
Symonds became a successful mercer, and was one of the three wardens (renter warden) of the Worshipful Company of Mercers by 1583. He married a woman named Anne by 1576 and moved to the parish of All Hallows, Lombard Street, at about this time. In 1582, he was among the rich of the city, and one of the two richest men in his parish. J. N. Hare attributes this wealth to the cloth trade that "dominated London's exports".

== Charitable bequests ==
By his death, sometime between 24 April 1586 and 29 July 1587, he had accumulated a large amount of land in the South East of England. In his will, he left land and property in Chadwell and West Ham in Essex, and a farm at East Shalford in Surrey, to his wife. Then following her death, he directed that a group of trustees, including his brother William, Mr. Bilson as warden of the New College at Winchester, and four others, should secure a licence and an act of parliament for an almshouse to be constructed at Winchester named Christ's Hospital. In addition, he left annual payments for a number of charitable purposes, including the poor of All Saint, Lombard Street and Chadwell in Essex.

It was this almshouse that was to become Peter Symonds College; however, legal struggles over Symonds' land delayed construction. Richard Symonds, claimed to be Peter's sole heir, occupied the property at Ingleby in Chadwell and Temple Marsh in West Ham before selling them, breaking the terms of Peter's will. By 1600, after reportedly paying £280, the Winchester city corporation secured the land. It is unknown when exactly the almshouse was constructed, though it was in progress in 1604, and has been accepted to be complete by 1607. King James I gave royal consent for the hospital in 1615, thus giving the hospital legal status.
