= David Smith (embroiderer) =

David Smith (died 1587) was an embroiderer who served Elizabeth I and a philanthropist who founded an almshouse for six poor widows in London.

== Embroidery at court ==
In February 1563 the offices of court embroidery which had been held by Guillaume Brellant and William Ibgrave were given to David Smith and William Middleton. Middleton mostly worked on furnishings such as bed hangings, while Smith worked to embellish Elizabeth's gowns and other costume made by her tailors Walter Fyshe and William Jones. Smith also worked for Robert Dudley, 1st Earl of Leicester.

A summary of payments made by privy seal warrant between July 1568 and July 1569 includes £87-18s-4d to Smith and Middleton. Elizabeth's wardrobe accounts detail a number of Smith's works. In 1565, he embroidered a partlet (worn at the shoulders) with gold passementerie and pearls, described in a warrant for payment:

for enbrauderinge of a very rich partelet upon silver sarcenet with cheynes of gold and great pearls beinge wrought with straight stripes downe right with a twiste of venice gold on ether syde of the cheynes and pearles for workmanshipp of the same partelet and new setting on of the Jewells in in the band xl s (40 shillings).

Smith was sometimes asked to refurbish and recycle embroidered items. In 1581, he combined three old pearl hat bands to make one anew. He also worked on a jewel-set "whale's head" for a scarf.

== The Widow's Inn ==
Smith become wealthy and by his will in 1587 endowed a hospital and almshouse for six poor widows at St Peter's Hill in Castle Baynard ward. An account of the almshouse founded by "D. S. embroderer" with the rules for the occupants was included in Holinshed's Chronicle. His daughters Mary Paradine and Anne Chamberlain contributed to the foundation, which was known as "Smith's Almshouses" or the "Widow's Inn". Smith himself suggested the names "Poor Widow's Alley or Poor Widow's Inn". His will mentions another embroiderer John Parr (died 1607) as a business associate who would manage some legacies to Smith's family. The original almshouse buildings were destroyed in the Great Fire of London of September 1566, and rebuilt by Thomas Fitch. Subsequently, Smith's foundation was merged with the Christ's Hospital charities.

David Smith died on 10 August 1587 and was buried at St Benet's, Paul's Wharf. According to his monument, he was 63 years old.
