= Andrew Baynton =

16th-century English politician and scholar

Sir Andrew Baynton (c. 1515/1516–1564) was an English scholar and member of Parliament.

Baynton was son and heir of Sir Edward Baynton, of Bromham, Wiltshire, a favourite courtier of Henry VIII, vice-chamberlain to three of his queens, and a friend and patron of Hugh Latimer, some of the correspondence between them (ca. 1530) being printed in Foxe's Book of Martyrs.

Baynton was born circa 1515 or 1516, and was placed by his father to study French under John Palsgrave, the court tutor. He wrote a prefatory letter to his master's book, L'esclaircissement de la langue francaise (1530). About the same time, he attended Henry Knyvet on his embassy from Henry to the emperor.

Succeeding his father (c. 1544), he was returned to Parliament for Marlborough in 1545, Horsham in 1547, Westbury in Oct 1553, Marlborough again in 1555, and Calne from 1558 to 1559.

Bayton married, first, Phillipa Brulet, a daughter of the court embroiderer Guillaume Brellant. After an annulment in 1562, he married Frances Lee and they had one daughter, Anne. She did not inherit because Andrew had entailed the Baynton estates to his brother Edward (1517–1593).
