= The Complaint of Roderick Mors =

The Complaint (or Complaynt) of Roderick (or Roderyck) Mors (c. 1542), by Henry Brinklow, is a well-known example of 'complaint literature' of the mid-Tudor period.

== Sources ==
- J. Meadows Cowper (ed.), Henry Brinklow's Complaynt of Roderyck Mors, Early English Text Society (Trübner and Co., London 1874). Full edition of the text at Internet Archive, and at Google, and at HathiTrust.
- The complaynt of Roderyck Mors, somtyme a gray fryre, vnto the parliament howse of Ingland his natural cuntry for the redresse of certen wicked lawes, euel customs ad cruell decreys (Imprinted at Sauoy: Per Fransicum de Turona). Scan of original text from Umich/eebo (Open).
