= Margery Guinet =

English silkwoman to the Tudor court (died 1544)

Margaret (or Margery) Gwynnethe (or Guinet) (died 1544), was an English businesswoman. She was the mother of poet Anne Locke, and the silkwoman of queen Anne Boleyn, queen Anne of Cleves, and queen Katherine Parr.

== Biography ==
She was the daughter of Dafydd ap Llewelyn ap Ithel of Castellmarch (Abersoch), Llŷn, Caernarfonshire. She was the sister of John Gwynneth, rector of Luton (1537–1558) and of St. Peter, Westcheap in the City of London (1543–1556).

She first married Edward Awpart, citizen and member of the Worshipful Company of Girdlers of London in the parish of St. Mary le Bow, who originated from Penkridge in Staffordshire and died in London in 1532, leaving Margaret with five children. She married secondly to Stephen Vaughan (merchant and MP), and as such she was known as "Mistress Vaughan".

Her spouse recommended her work to Thomas Cromwell, claiming that she had already devised certain works for Anne Boleyn, but that they had been forwarded to her. Mistress Vaughan supplied crimson silk fringes for a close stool, and tawny satin and ribbon to line a coffer made for the Lady Mary by William Green in August 1537. She provided supplies for saddlery for queen Anne of Cleves. Queen Katherine Parr did not pay very promptly and her husband pursued the debts.

She fell ill in August 1544 and died that year.
