= John Parr (embroiderer) =

John Parr (died 1607) was an English embroiderer who worked for Elizabeth I and James VI and I. He owned houses in London and Putney. His surname was sometimes spelled "Parre".

== Career ==
Late in his career, John Parr tried to register a coat of arms, but then cancelled his application. According to William Dethick, he feared offending the Earl of Pembroke whose mother Anne Herbert, Countess of Pembroke was a member of the Kendal Parr family. It was said that the embroiderer hailed from Cumberland and his father was a peddlar. The application cost him £10. Dethick was censured for attempting to grant arms to Parr which had properly belonged to William Parr, Marquess of Northampton.

John Parr "embroderer" married Jane Goore, daughter of the skinner John Goore, in February 1563 at St Mary Aldermary in London. He appears in royal wardrobe records from 1581. Parr's predecessors were David Smith and William Middleton, who had been given the offices of court embroidery formerly held by Guillaume Brellant in February 1563.

Parr lived in the parish of St Benet's, Paul's Wharf, not far from the Royal Wardrobe in the parish of St Andrew. He was a churchwarden, and from 1587 to 1602 he held the civic post of deputy of Castle Baynard ward. By May 1600, he had acquired a house in Putney, and the manor court of Wimbledon discussed his rights to erect a fence there.

== Embroidery works ==
Parr embroidered a gown for Bess of Hardwick in 1590 made by the queen's tailor William Jones. The gown was intended as a New Year's Day gift for Queen Elizabeth.

Parr's work sometimes involved transferring valuable embroidery from one garment to another. In 1591, he took his own embroidery of a pattern of twigs and branches from a pair of "hanging sleeves" and attached it to a new white satin ground for Elizabeth. In 1596, Parr embroiderered three gowns for ladies in waiting, and embellished the white satin and silver camlet stomachers with "a tuft of Venice stuff with hanging spangles and a garland of silver purl about them".

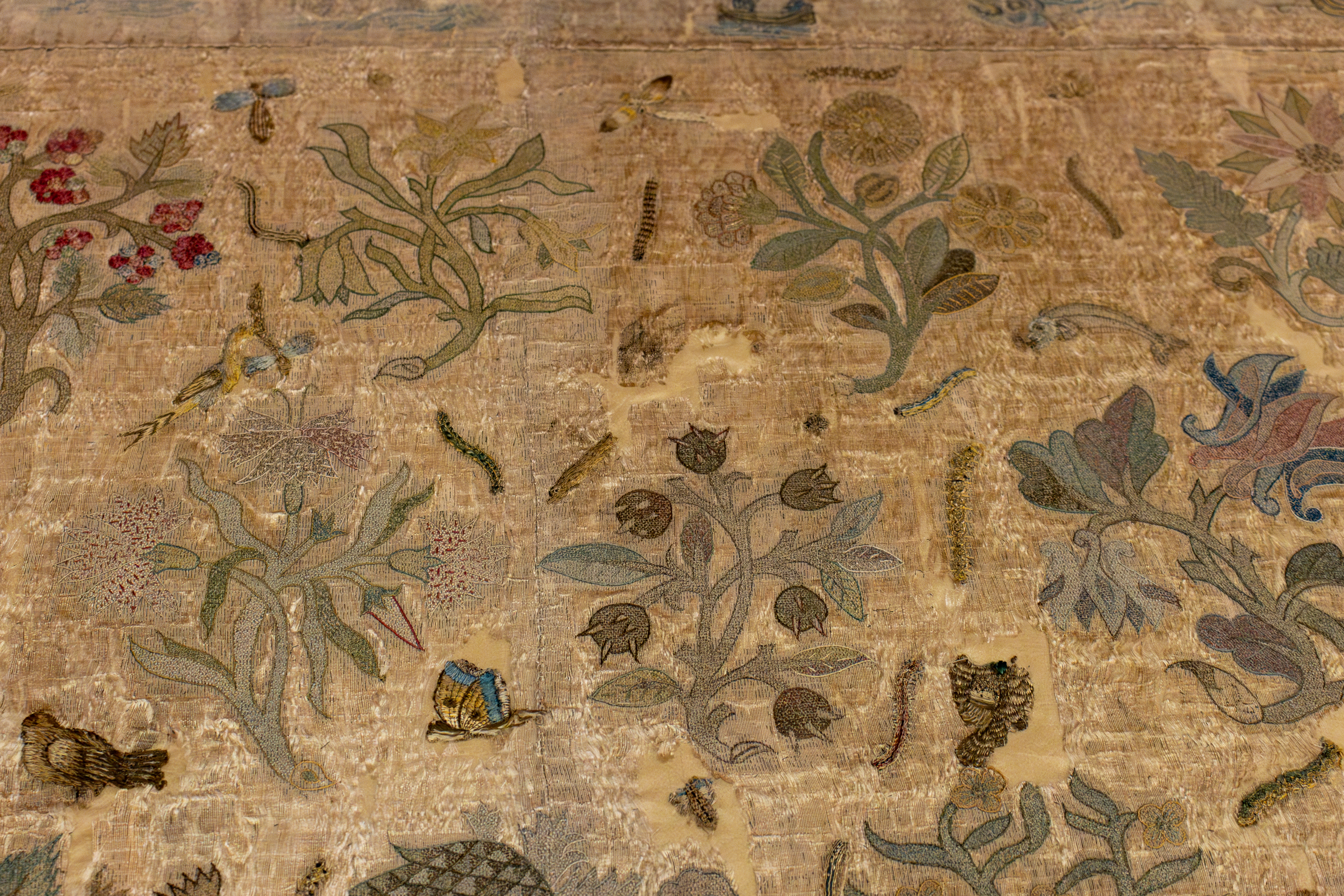
Elizabethan embroidery on the Bacton Altar Cloth

He was employed to restore the embellishments of favourite garments. Parr and William Jones altered a gown given to the Countess of Kildare in December 1602. The gown had been a gift to Elizabeth from Ambrose Dudley, 3rd Earl of Warwick in 1578. Parr refurbished a gown made by the Queen's tailor William Jones in 1595. The embroidery included pillars and pyramids and "esse firmies", the closed "S" or esse fermée used as symbol of affection. Parr's rework and restoration in 1598 after three years of wear included:

Item, to John Parr our enbrauderer for enbrauderinge of peramides and esse firmies wrought uppon murrey Satten with purles plates Spangles and venice stuffe being voided out and enbraudered on the hinder part of a train gown of Cloth of Silver with fyve ounce of purles plate and spangles.

The wardrobe records suggest that Parr sometimes embroidered or worked with motifs on "slips", or fabrics intended to show, which could then be sewed on the garments. In 1593, he stitched down "pillers and esses of gold" on the train of a gown and worked "ripping off" pillars from sleeves and "new setting them on again".

As a court embroiderer, Parr can be tentatively associated with the Bacton Altar Cloth, a repurposed late Elizabethan skirt. The first scheme of embroidery on the Bacton cloth is worked directly on a drawing on the silver chamblet fabric, as a professional embroiderer might do. A second additional scheme of embroidery in a similar manner appears less accomplished. The second scheme includes a depiction of a bear copied from Nicolaes de Bruyn's Animalium Quadrapedum (1594).

In April 1604, Parr and his workshop were commissioned to embroider the initials "J.R" with roses and imperial crowns on fifty coats for the royal guard. Gold and silver spangles for the coats were supplied by a goldsmith, Giles Simpson. Parr undertook similar work in 1606 and 1607, partnered with William Broderick.

== Parr's cup ==
John Parr presented a silver gilt cup to the Worshipful Company of Broderers. In his will he left £4 to have his portrait made for the company, holding the cup. The cup with engraved scenes was made in Nuremberg around 1575. An 1880 electrotype copy is held by the Victoria and Albert Museum. Parr died in 1607, his bequests included a jewel depicting the story of Orpheus.

Parr was said to be 72 years old at his death on 17 July 1607. He was buried at St Benet's, Paul's Wharf beside his wife Mary. According to his monument, erected by his daughter Anne Gough in 1611 he had served as a royal embroiderer for 25 years and had been married to Mary for 34 years. A public house near the church was known as "Parr's Head", possibly named after the embroiderer or Old Tom Parr.

Thomas Gough, his son-in-law and an Inner Temple trained lawyer, petitioned for payment of £2000 owed to Parr by King James, a debt mentioned in the will.

== The Widow's Inn ==
Parr was mentioned in the 1587 will of the court embroiderer David Smith as a business associate who would manage some legacies to Smith's family. By his 1607 will, Parr set up a charity in the parish of St Benet's, Paul's Wharf which contributed an income to the Widow's Inn almshouse at St Peter's Hill founded by Smith. William Broderick left money to the Widow's Inn in 1620.
