= William Lok =

16th century Sheriff of London

Sir William Lok
- Born: 1480
- Died: 24 August 1550 (aged 69–70); Cheapside, London
- Buried: Hospital of St Thomas of Acre, London
- Spouses: Alice Spenser; Katherine Cooke; Eleanor Marsh; Elizabeth Farthing
- Issue: William Lok; Philip Lok; Jane Lok; Peter Lok; William Lok (again); Richard Lok; Edmund Lok; Thomas Lok; Matthew Lok; John Lok; Henry Lok; Michael Lok; John Lok (again); Dorothy Lok; Katherine Lok; Rose Lok; Alice Lok; Thomasine Lok; Elizabeth Lok
- Father: Thomas Lok
- Mother: Joan Wilcock

Sir William Lok (1480 – 24 August 1550) was a gentleman usher to Henry VIII and a mercer, alderman, and sheriff of London. He was the great-great-great-grandfather of the philosopher John Locke (1632–1704).

== Family ==
William Lok was the second son of Thomas Lok, a London mercer, and the grandson of John Lok, also a mercer, who was Sheriff of London in 1461. His mother was Joan Wilcock (d. 1512), only daughter of one 'Mr Wilcock' of Rotherham, Yorkshire.

== Career ==
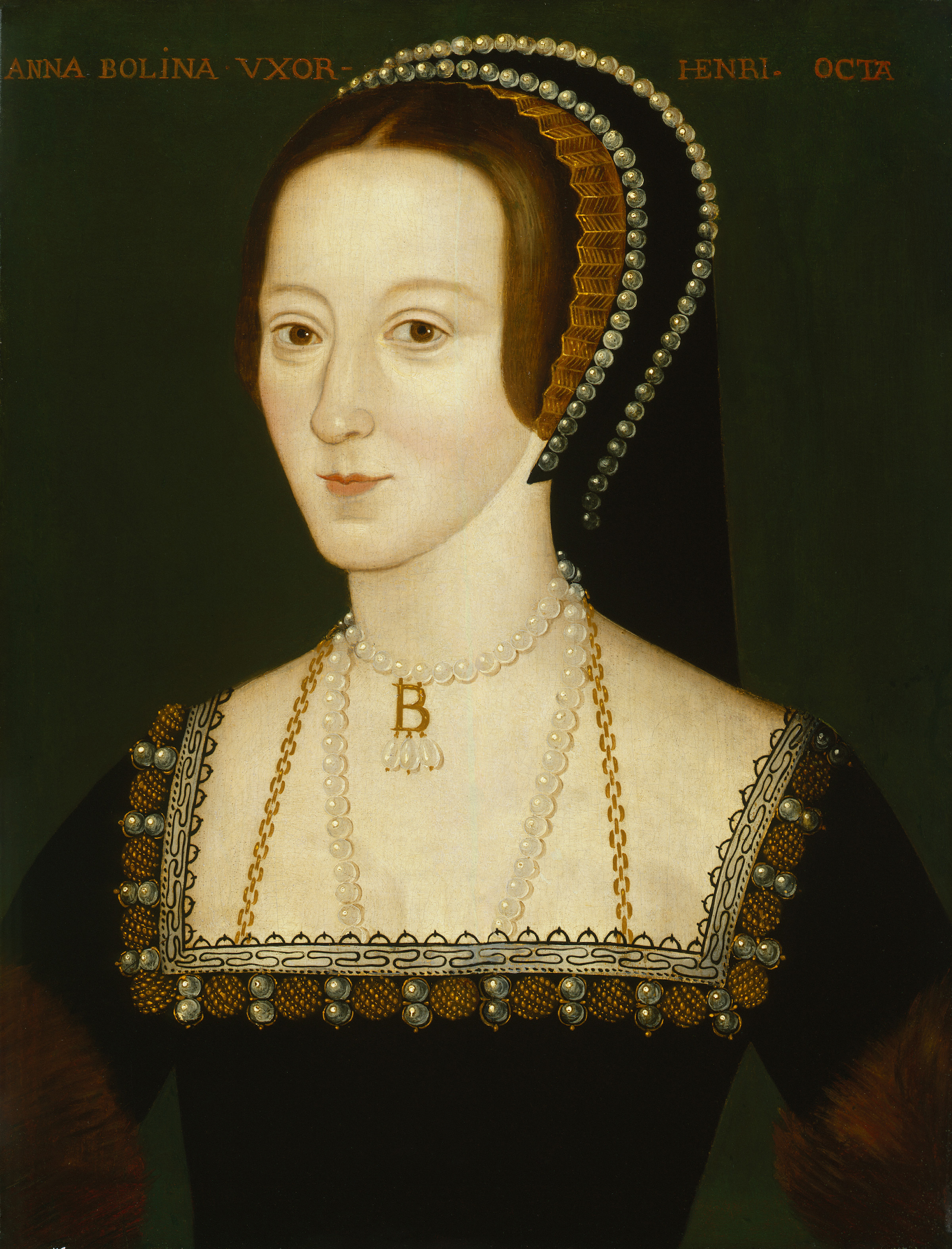
Anne Boleyn, for whom Lok brought French translations of the Gospels from overseas

Even before he was admitted to the Mercers' Company in 1507, Lok had already supplied cloth of gold and silver to Henry VIII. During the course of his visits as a mercer to the annual markets in Antwerp and Bergen op Zoom in the Low Countries, he collected intelligence which he passed on to the King and his chief minister, Thomas Cromwell.

In March 1527, he was granted 'exclusive licence to import silks, jewels, and mercery wares for court revels'. In addition to his trade as a mercer, Lok was involved in other business ventures, including the export of beer. In 1528 he supplied the royal ordnance with six hundred leather harnesses. In 1531 a ship travelling from Chios to London which had been hired by Lok and John Gresham was detained at Lisbon. According to a letter dating from 1533, Lok had at some time visited Crete, and may thus have been involved in the wine or currant trade. The wealth he had accumulated as a merchant by 1535 is indicated by the fact that he was rated in that year, perhaps in connection with a subsidy, at £1000.

Lok and his wife were Protestants, and supported Henry VIII's divorce from Catherine of Aragon. His daughter, Rose Lok, later recounted how he pulled down a copy of the bull by which Pope Clement VII had excommunicated Henry VIII for his marriage to his second wife, Anne Boleyn:

Of my father in Holinshed's Chronicle I find this story. In the 25th year of the reign of King Henry 8, being the year of Our Lord 1534, at the suit of the Lady Catherine, Dowager, a curse was sent from the Pope, which cursed both the King and the realm. This curse was set up in the town of Dunkirk in Flanders, for the bringer thereof durst no nearer approach, where it was taken down by Mr Lok of London, mercer. Now I, his daughter, Rose Throckmorton, widow, late wife of Simon Throckmorton, esquire, and first the wife of Anthony Hickman, a merchant of London, reading this of my father, have thought good to leave to my children this addition to it, that for that act the King gave him £100 a year, and made him a Gentleman of his Privy Chamber, and he was the King's mercer, and his Majesty vouchsafed to dine at his house. Moreover he was knighted, although he was never mayor, but only Sheriff of London, and so was never any Londoner before him.

Lok also brought French translations of the Gospels and Epistles from the continent for Henry VIII's second wife, Anne Boleyn.

On 20 October 1545, he was elected alderman for Vintry ward, and on 3 March 1549 was elected Sheriff, and knighted by the young Edward VI. On 10 October 1549, he was among those who escorted the Lord Protector, Edward Seymour, 1st Duke of Somerset, to imprisonment in the Tower of London after his first fall from power.

== Death ==
Lok died 24 August 1550 at his house in Bow Lane, Cheapside, and was buried on 27 August near his parents and his first wife, Alice Spenser, in the Mercers' Church at St Thomas of Acre in London, where his coat of arms was depicted in a window. His fourth wife, Elizabeth Meredith, was buried there after her death in 1551.

In his will, he left houses and shops in various London parishes including Bow, Spitalfields, and Cheapside, as well as twelve farms near London, and the Dog's Head inn in Cheapside.

== Marriages and issue ==
Lok married firstly Alice Spenser (d.1522), an early convert to Protestantism.

He married secondly Katherine Cooke (d. 14 Oct 1537), daughter of Sir Thomas Cooke of Wiltshire.

He married thirdly a wife named Eleanor (d.1546), who was the widow of Walter Marsh.

He married fourthly Elizabeth Farthing (d.1551) who was the widow firstly of a husband surnamed Hutton and secondly of Robert Meredith.

Lok had nineteen children, of whom five sons and seven daughters, all children of his first two marriages, survived to adulthood. According to Sutton, all Lok's sons were mercers, and it is likely that all his daughters were silkwomen.

A pedigree of the Lok family assigns Lok's children to his first two wives as follows:

By his first wife, Alice Spence or Spencer:

- William Lok (1511–17), died without issue.
- Philip Lok (d.1524), died without issue.
- Jane Lok (b. 29 August 1512), who married Robert Meredith of London, mercer.
- Peter Lok (d.1517) died without issue.
- William Lok (1517–1519), died without issue.
- Richard Lok (d.1516), died without issue.
- Edmund Lok, 'died for love of Sir Brian Tuke's daughter, 1545'.
- Thomas Lok (8 February 1514 – 9 November 1556), mercer, eldest surviving son by his father's first marriage, who married Mary Long.
- Matthew Lok (d.1551) of London, merchant, married Elizabeth Baker.

By his second wife, Katherine Cooke:

- Dorothy Lok, who married firstly Otwell Hill (d.1543) of London, merchant, and secondly John Cosworth of London and Cornwall, merchant. Otwell Hill was the brother of Richard Hill.
- Katherine Lok, who married firstly Thomas Stacey of London, Warden of the Mercers' Company in 1555 together with his brother-in-law, Thomas Lok, and secondly William Matthew of Bradden, Northamptonshire.
- Rose Lok (26 December 1526 ), who married firstly the London mercer Anthony Hickman, son of Walter Hickman of Woodford, Essex, and secondly Simon Throckmorton, esquire, of Brampton, Huntingdonshire, and was a Marian exile. She died 21 November 1613, aged 86.
- John Lok, who married Margaret Spert, and died in France without issue. He went to Jerusalem in 1553, and to Guinea in 1554.
- Alice Lok, (d.1537), died without issue.
- Thomasine Lok (d.1530), died without issue.
- Henry Lok (d.1571) of London, merchant and mercer, who married Anne Vaughan, by whom he was father of the poet, Henry Lok. His will, dated 18 January 1571, was proved 31 October 1571.
- Michael Lok of London, merchant, who married firstly Jane Wilkinson, daughter of William Wilkinson, mercer and sheriff of London, and secondly Margery Perient, widow of Caesar Adelmare, father of Sir Julius Caesar.
- Elizabeth Lok (3 August 1535 – c.1581), who married firstly Richard Hill (d.1568), mercer and alderman of London, and by him had 13 children, and secondly Nicholas Bullingham, Bishop of Worcester, who died in 1576, by whom she had one child.
- John Lok, whose mother died at his birth, and he the day after.
