= Joan Wilkinson (died 1556) =

German silkwoman & Protestant reformer (??–1556)

- Died: December 1556; Frankfurt, Germany
- Spouse: William Wilkinson
- Issue: Christian Wilkinson; Frances Wilkinson; Jane Wilkinson
- Father: Roger North
- Mother: Christian Warcop

Joan or Jane Wilkinson (née North) (d.1556) was silkwoman to Anne Boleyn and Lady Lisle and a Protestant reformer. She was a friend of other leading reformers, including Bishops John Hooper and Hugh Latimer. During the reign of Mary I, she became a religious exile, and died at Frankfurt in 1556.

== Family ==
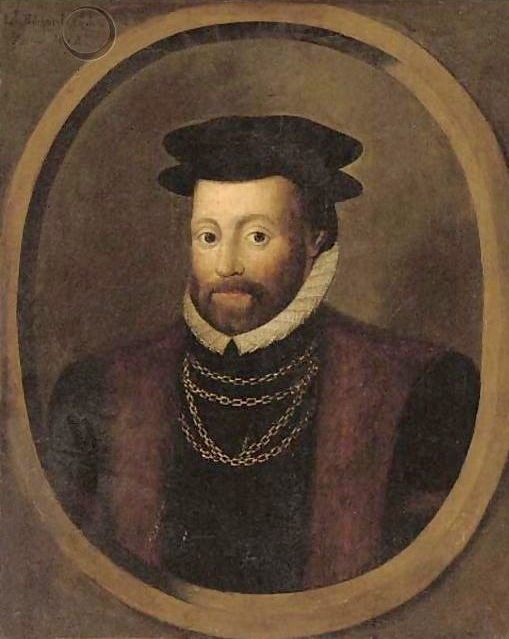
Jane North's brother, Edward North, 1st Baron North

Joan North was the daughter of Roger North (d.1509) and Christian Warcop, the daughter of Richard Warcop of Sinnington, Yorkshire. She had a brother, Edward North, 1st Baron North. Little is known of their relationship beyond the fact that she forgave him a debt in her will, and it may be that the relationship was strained by their differing religious beliefs.

After the death of Roger North, Joan's mother, Christiana Warcop married, as his first wife, Sir Ralph Warren (c.1483–1553), Lord Mayor of London in 1536 and 1544, but had no issue by him. After Christiana's death, Sir Ralph Warren married, as his second wife, Joan Trelake (d. 8 February 1573), the daughter of John Trelake of Cornwall. According to Sutton, Joan enjoyed 'excellent relations' with her stepfather, Sir Ralph Warren, and his second wife, Joan Trelake, and was a beneficiary under Sir Ralph Warren's will.

== Career ==
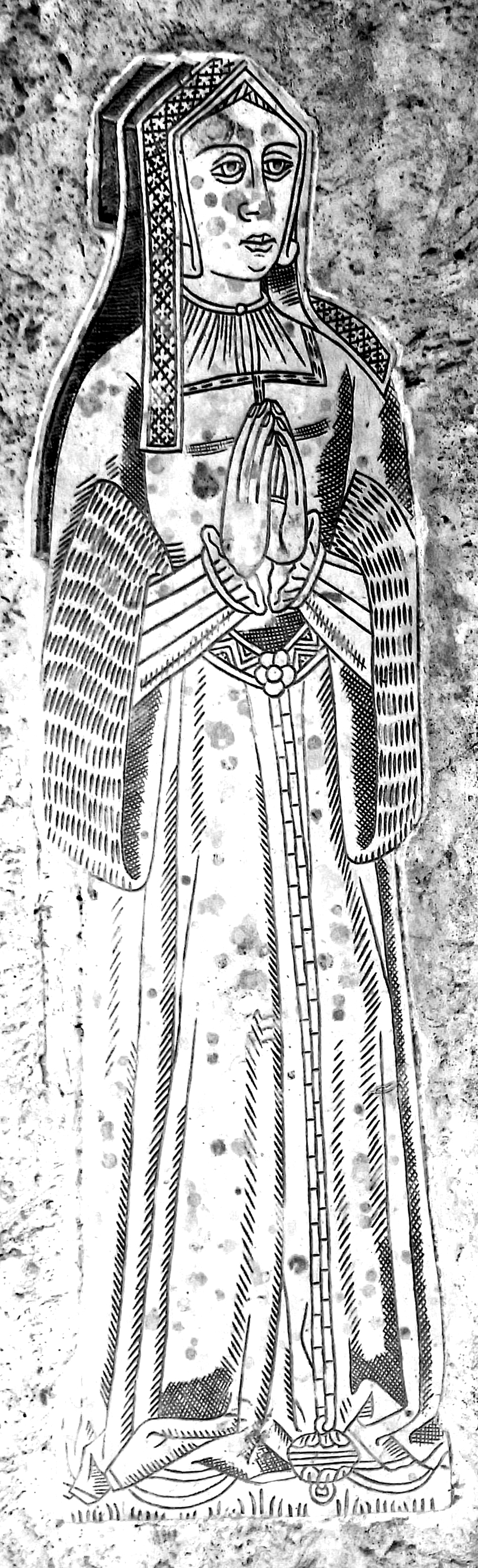
Monumental brass of Lady Lisle, to whom Joan Wilkinson supplied bonnets and frontlets

Joan North married William Wilkinson, a wealthy London Sheriff and alderman who served on three occasions as Warden of the Mercers' Company.

=== Silkwoman to Anne Boleyn ===
Between the years 1533 and 1535 Joan Wilkinson was silkwoman serving the household of Henry VIII's second wife, Anne Boleyn, where according to Litzenberger, "she would have been exposed to the evangelical beliefs espoused by Anne and her chaplains", among them Hugh Latimer. After Anne Boleyn was arrested, in 1536, her chaplain William Latymer was apprehended at the port of Sandwich with books that he had bought for her Flanders. Some of the books were forwarded to Joan Wilkinson. The suggestion that Joan's religious convictions were formed early is supported by the bequest to her of a ring in the will of the London mercer, Robert Pakington (d. 13 November 1536), who also held radical Protestant beliefs, and by her involvement in the importing of evangelical books in the 1530s.

Wilkinson continued to trade as a silkwoman. On 6 February 1538, John Husee wrote to Lady Lisle that he would send "the bonnets and frontlets ... I had them of Mrs Wylkenson, with much ado, because Mrs Hutton hath not paid her for the last". Her husband, William Wilkinson died in 1543. Peter Symonds had briefly been Wilkinson's apprentice, and continued in his widow's service. Joan Wilkinson, referring to Symonds as "my servant at London", left him £6 13s 4d in her will.

After her husband's death, and perhaps before, Joan Wilkinson resided in a house leased from the Mercers in Soper Lane in London. She had purchased the lease from Katherine Hall, mother of the chronicler, Edward Hall, and still owed Mistress Hall £250 at her death.

She also held an estate in her own right at King's Stanley in Gloucestershire comprising 'a capital messuage and 60 acres' granted to her in 1552 by Edward Twissell.

=== Wilkinson and the Protestant reformers ===
In 1551 the Protestant radical John Hooper became Bishop of Gloucester. Joan Wilkinson developed a friendship with him, and with other Protestant reformers including John Bradford, Nicholas Ridley, Hugh Latimer, and Thomas Cranmer. When the reformers were imprisoned for their beliefs during the early years of the reign of Queen Mary, Joan Wilkinson acted as their advocate and supplied them with necessities. Her efforts on behalf of Bishop Latimer were recognised in a brief letter he wrote her expressing his gratitude:

If the gift of a pot of water shall not be in oblivion with God, how can God forget your manifold and bountiful gifts when he shall say unto you, "I was in prison, and you visited me"?

Letters to her from John Bradford and Archbishop Cranmer have also survived.

According to Litzenberger, Bradford was of the view that Joan Wilkinson should become a martyr to the Protestant cause, but other reformers, including Archbishop Cranmer advised her to leave England and promote Protestantism from the safety of the continent. After Bishops Ridley and Latimer were executed, Joan became a religious exile in Frankfurt, where she died in December 1556 at the house of her cousin, Cuthbert Warcop, a London mercer, and his wife, Anne. Her place of burial is unknown.

Joan Wilkinson's will opens with a declaration that she was in "voluntarie exile for the true religion of Christ", and her bequests reflect her religious convictions. She left £100 for the relief of the various congregations of Protestant exiles on the continent, as well as funds for the education of Bishop Hooper's son, Daniel, and also bequeathed her Protestant books, which Bishop Hooper "hadde the use of during his lif", to the exile congregations. She entrusted the marriage of her only surviving daughter, Jane, to her cousins, William Holland and Cuthbert Warcop, and Warcop's wife, Anne, stipulating that Jane would lose part of her inheritance if she failed to marry a husband "utterly abhorring papistry". She bequeathed the remaining years of the lease of her house in Soper Lane to Warcop. The will was not proved in England until 23 June 1559.

Cuthbert Warcop did not long survive Joan, and in 1561 there was an arbitration between Anne Warcop, widow, William Holland and Michael Lok. Subsequently, in March 1565, Lok wrote requesting permission to keep at the Mercers’ Hall a chest containing books and writings of Joan Wilkinson and Cuthbert Warcop, both deceased. Unfortunately neither the books and writings nor the records of the arbitration have survived.

Joan was praised both during her lifetime and after her death by the martyrologist, John Foxe, and John Bradford's letters to her were printed in Foxe's Actes and Monuments.

== Marriage and issue ==
Joan North married William Wilkinson (d.1543), mercer and Sheriff of London, by whom she had three daughters:

- Christian Wilkinson, who married William Bury of Culham, Oxfordshire, by whom she had four children.
- Frances Wilkinson, who married a London mercer, Leonard Hetherington (d.1556), by whom she had several children.
- Jane Wilkinson (d.1571), who was the first wife of Michael Lok, by whom she had several children.
