= Edward Dering (priest) =

English priest and academic

Edward Dering (c. 1540–1576) was an English priest and academic, known as a classical scholar, controversialist, supporter of Thomas Cartwright, and fiery preacher against his fellow clergy. Constantly in trouble from 1570, he was not found to be nonconformist in doctrine, but was an opponent of the episcopate.

== Life ==
He was the third son of John Dering, Esq., of Surrenden-Dering, near Pluckley in Kent, and Margaret, his wife, daughter of John Brent of Charing, Kent. Richard Dering who was the grandfather of Sir Edward Dering, 1st Baronet was his elder brother.

He received his education at Christ's College, Cambridge where he was admitted Bachelor of Arts (BA) in 1560 and shortly afterwards was elected a Fellow. The following year, 1561, he wrote a Latin verse for the second instalment of Barnaby Googe's translation of Palingenius's Zodiac of Life (sig. A3r). In this poem, he fiercely attacks William Fulke, whose Antiprognosticon, an essay against judicial astrology, which had appeared a few months earlier in September 1560. He also attacks all those who wrote verses for Fulke's book, including his brother Samuel, William Painter, and John Lucas. Dering commenced Master of Arts (Cambridge) (MA Cantab.) in 1563. In the following year Queen Elizabeth visited the university, and proceeded to make a tour of the colleges; on her arrival at Emmanuel College, Dering presented her with a congratulatory copy of Greek verses. In 1566 he was university proctor, and the next year preacher before the university on the Lady Margaret foundation. On 28 November 1568 he was collated by Matthew Parker to the rectory of Pluckley, his home parish. He also appears about this time to have been one of the chaplains to the Duke of Norfolk, and to have held a chaplaincy in the Tower of London, where he preached on 11 December 1569, a powerful sermon, afterwards printed.

He was chosen by Parker as the scholar best qualified to reply to the Catholic Sander (Nicholas Sanders, sometimes, Sander) and his treatise, De Visibili Monarchia; and he was employed by the privy council to draw up a series of answers to a book which at the time was supposed to have been written by Cartwright. His Sparing Restraint was a reply to Thomas Harding, the Jesuit opponent of John Jewel. But on 25 February 1570 he preached vehemently at court before the queen, his text being Ps. lxxviii. 70, a fierce indictment against the clergy, and directly addressed Elizabeth herself whom he made responsible. This was a major turning-point, and the offence thus given meant he was suspended from preaching. He then took a leading part in the resistance to the new statutes of 1570, which were imposed on the University of Cambridge after the expulsion of Cartwright [see Cartwright, Thomas (1535–1603)]. In November 1570 he addressed a letter to William Cecil, the chancellor of the university, in which he freely criticised the new statutes and their authors with remarkable freedom; and 24 March 1572 he wrote again on behalf of Cartwright, urging that he should be permitted to return to Cambridge and to lecture there.

In 1572 he was appointed divinity reader at St. Paul's Cathedral, and delivered a series of well-attended expositions on the earlier chapters of the Epistle to the Hebrews. In the preface (22 April 1572) to 'A briefe and necessarie Catechism,' he renewed his attacks on the clergy. 'There was never no nation,' he said, 'which had so ignorant ministers'. In 1573 he was suspended from his lectureship and summoned before the Star Chamber. He was there charged with having given utterance to unwarrantable and unorthodox sentiments, and more especially with having predicted that Parker, his former friend, would be the last archbishop of Canterbury. This charge he sought to explain away. Examined as to his general agreement with the doctrine of the Thirty-nine Articles, his answers were deemed satisfactory. His sentence of suspension from his lectureship was cancelled. But when an effort was made in 1574 to obtain for Dering the appointment of lecturer at Whittington College as successor to Thomas Sampson, Parker put his veto on the proposal.

Shortly after this Dering's health began to give way. In 1572 he married Anne Locke, who nursed him as he succumbed to tuberculosis. He died 26 June 1576 at Thoby, in the parish of Mountnessing, Essex.

== Works ==
The collected edition of 1614, London, contains:

- A Sermon preached before the Queenes Maiestie.
- A Sermon preached at the Tower of London.
- Twenty-seven Lectures or Readings upon the Epistle to the Hebrews.
- Certain godly and comfortable Letters, &c.
- A briefe and necessary Catechisme for Christian Housholders.
- Godly private Prayers for Christian Families.

== Sources ==
- This article incorporates text from a publication now in the public domain: "Dering, Edward (1540?-1576)". Dictionary of National Biography. London: Smith, Elder & Co. 1885–1900.
