= Jean Taffin =

Dutch theologian (1529–1602)

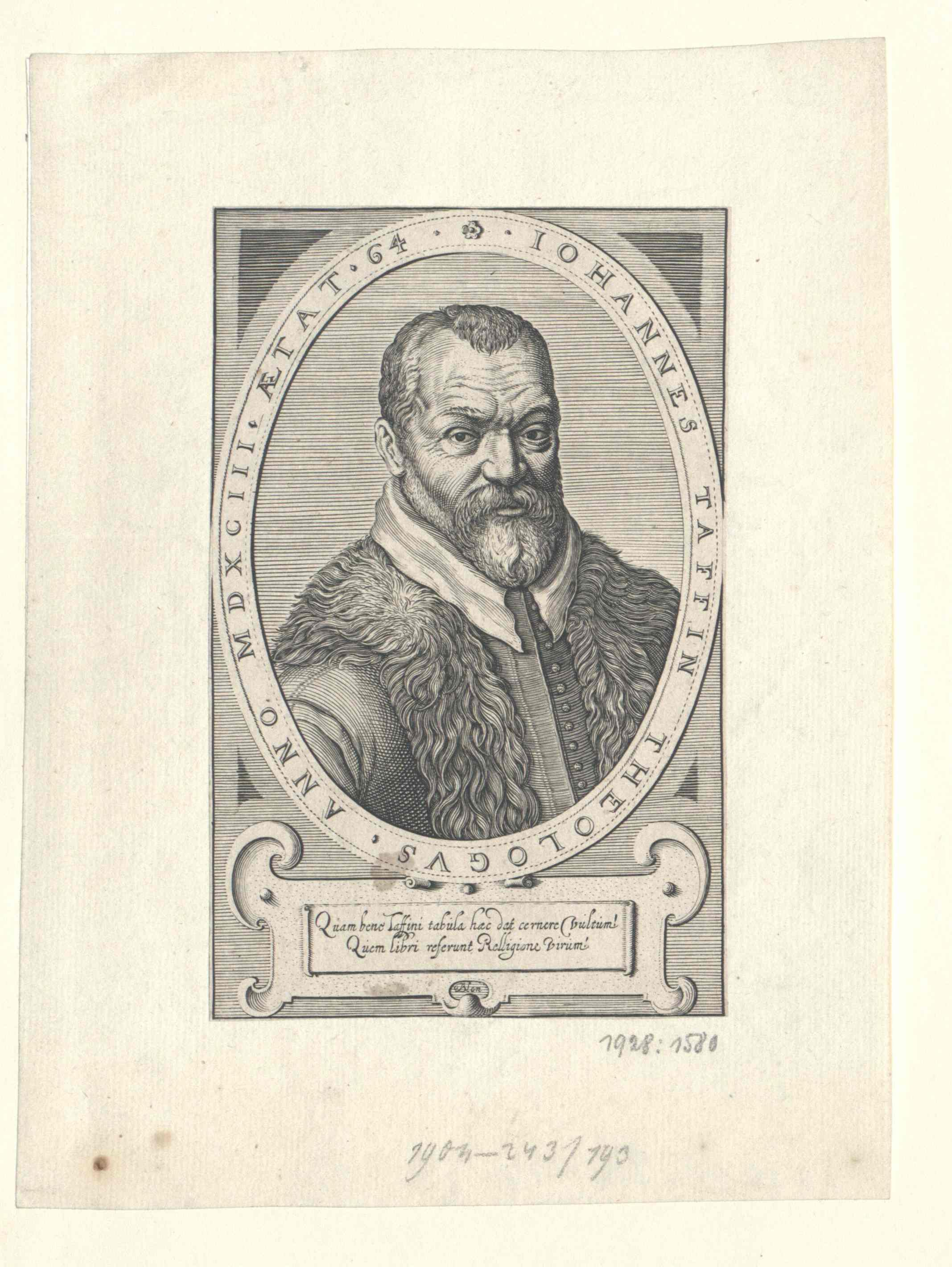

Jean Taffin (1529–1602), was a Dutch Walloon minister and theologian. He was an early leader in the Dutch Further Reformation.

== Biography ==
He was born in Tournai in 1528 to a noble family and travelled to Italy where he studied in Padua before returning north. From 1554 to 1557 he was librarian to Antoine Perrenot de Granvelle in Atrecht (Arras). He left Granvelle to study in Geneva under Calvin and Beza and in 1557 he became a minister in Antwerp. He had to flee the contra-reformers and travelled to Aken and on to Worms, and after receiving his doctorate in Geneva became a pastor in Metz and in 1562 he got his own church there.

In 1564 he was invited to a secret conference by William the Silent to talk about a union of Protestant churches with Carolus Niellius, François Baudouin and Guy de Bres. Afterwards, he preached at the St. Walburgkerk in Antwerp. He then wrote a protest from the Wallonian Synod against Catholicism for which he was banned and fled on 17 April 1567 to Metz, but fled again due to the edict of 4 April 1569 by the King of France that banned him from preaching and which caused his church to burn. He sought refuge in Heidelberg where he became a preacher again and was sent to the Wallonian Synod in Emden in 1570 where he pleaded for unity among the Huguenots and Wallonian refugees. From 1572 to 1575 he became a travelling minister in Vlissingen, Middelburg, and Veere. He had become chaplain to William the Silent in 1574 and presided over his marriage on 15 July 1575 to Charlotte de Bourbon, in the Grote Kerk, Den Briel. On his request, he also was peacekeeper between Caspar Coolhaes and Pieter Cornelisz uyten Briel, whose arguments about the Protestant faith had reached a boiling point in 1578. After William the Silent was assassinated in 1584, Taffin followed mayor Marnix but fled north to Leiden where he presided over the Wallonian Synod from 18 to 20 September 1587. In 1588 he was called to Haarlem where he became pastor of the Waalse Kerk, Haarlem. From there he helped organize the various northern refugees of his church into Walloon Reformed church at Amsterdam, where he went to serve in 1590 and where he later died of the plague in 1602.

== Works ==
Today, he is best known for his book Des marques des enfants de Dieu et des consolations dans leurs afflictions (The Marks of God's Children) (1585).

He also wrote The amendment of life comprised in fower bookes (1595)
