= Henry Lok =

English poet

Henry Lok (Lock, Locke) (1553?-1608?) was an English poet.

== Life ==
He was third son of Henry Lok, a London mercer (d. 1571), by his wife Anne Vaughan, the poet. Michael Lok the traveller was the poet's uncle, and Sir William Lok was his grandfather; Michael Cosworth was his cousin.

According to Anthony Wood, Lok spent some time in Oxford between his sixteenth and twenty-first year, but he does not seem to have matriculated in the university, and took no degree. On leaving Oxford he went to court and found a patron. Lok had some dealings with the Duke of Lennox and the Earl of Bothwell and in November 1590 he was in Edinburgh, In 1591 he contributed a sonnet to the Essayes of a Prentice, by James VI of Scotland and in May he reported on the North Berwick Witch Trials to Cecil. A persistent petitioner, early in 1597 Lok was, according to his own account, encouraged by the Countess of Warwick to apply to Sir Robert Cecil for a pension to tide him over. Lok's miscellaneous appeals resulted in his obtaining confidential employment in 1599 in Bayonne and the Basque country, collecting political gossip. He was skilled in ciphers, but indiscreet, and at one time his life seems to have been in danger. A year later he was living in the Strand, and Cecil did not employ him again.

In March 1606 he was imprisoned as an insolvent debtor in the Westminster Gatehouse, and in May 1608 he was similarly situated and friendless in the Clink in Southwark. Lok married Ann Moyle of Cornwall, and had two sons, Henry, born in 1592, and Charles.

== Works ==
Lok's works, like those of Thomas Hudson, are described in The Returne from Parnassus (1601) as fit 'to lie in some old nooks amongst old boots and shoes', and later Thomas Warton was scathing.

In 1593 Richard Field obtained a license to print a work entitled The first Parte of Christian Passions, conteyninge a hundred Sonnets of Meditation, Humiliation, and Prayer. No copy of this book is now extant. In 1597 Richard Field printed Lok's verse rendering of Ecclesiastes. The whole work is dedicated by Lok to Queen Elizabeth. An address to the reader, in which he refers to earlier paraphrases of Ecclesiastes by Theodore Beza, Tremellius, and others, is followed by commendatory verses, including some in Latin, by John Lyly, and others in English by 'M.C.,' i.e. Michael Cosworth, Lok's cousin. With it are printed Sundry Psalms of David, translated into Verse as briefly and significantly as the scope of the Text will suffer.

Sonnet VI of The first Parte of Christian Passions:

In pride of youth, when as unbridled lust

Did force me forth, my follies to bewray,

I challengèd as patrimony just

Each vain affection leading to decay,

And trusting to that treasure, post away

I wand’red in the world’s alluring sight.

Not reason, virtue, shame, or fear could stay

My appetite from tasting each delight,

Till want and weariness began me bite,

And so perforce to father I retire,

To whom I prostrate kneel—unworthy wight—

To name of son not daring to aspire;

Receive me yet, sweet Saviour, of Thy grace,

Poor penitent, into a servant’s place.

Lok's sonnets are introduced by a separate title-page in the Ecclesiastes volume. Two hundred and four treat of the Christian passions, and these are succeeded by 102, entitled Sundry Affectionate Sonets of a feeling Conscience, and the same theme is pursued in a further sequence of twenty-two, entitled Peculiar Prayers. Some copies contain an appendix of sixty secular sonnets, addressed to personalities of Elizabeth's court. Alexander Balloch Grosart. reprinted all these sonnets, together with the one prefixed to James VI's volume.

Lok also contributed commendatory verses to Michael Cosworth's rendering of the Psalms.
