= William Ibgrave =

William Ibgrave (died 1557) was an embroiderer working for the English royal court.

== Career ==
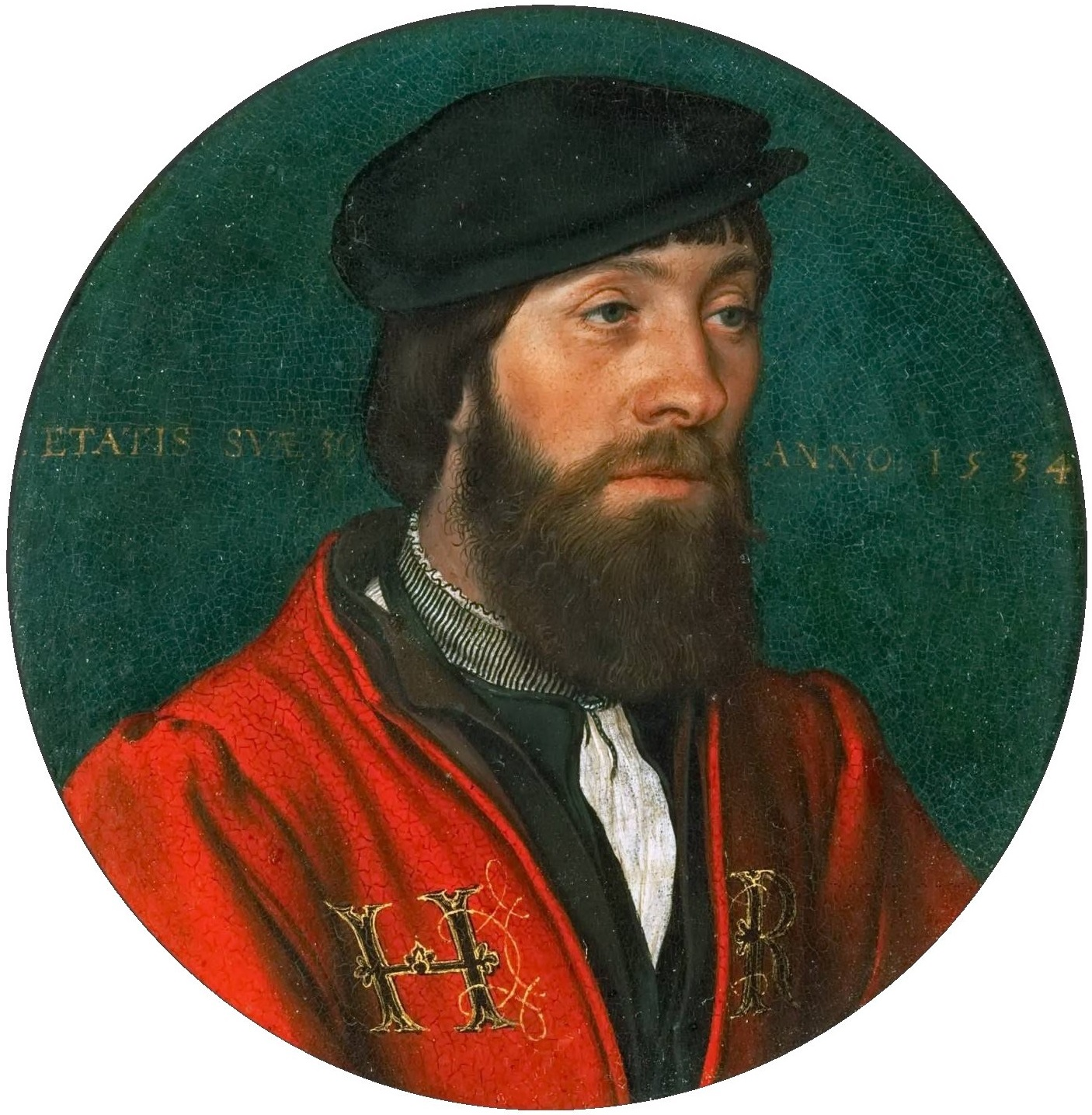
Ibgrave and his workshop embroidered the king's initials on livery clothes

He was a son of William and Elizabeth Ibgrave. Ibgrave worked for the Duke of Suffolk and for the revels. He was embroiderer to Henry VIII from 1528. He provided work with "H" and "K" initials for Henry and Catherine of Aragon.

Ibgrave worked Lady Lisle and visited Calais. Henry VIII paid him for work supplied to Anne Boleyn before their marriage, and he continued to work for her with Stephen Humble and Guillaume Brellant. He used pearls and jewels in his designs, in June 1536 outlining the "J" or "I" initial of Jane Seymour with emeralds for Henry's doublet, and using large quantities of pearl for her sleeves and kirtle. He also worked on saddles and the livery coats of the royal guard.

Ibgrave was rewarded with the manors of the Hyde at Abbots Langley and Sarratt in Hertfordshire in 1545. He embroidered clothes for Edward VI with Venice silver and damask silver thread, and in 1551 was given spangles (a kind of sequin) to decorate the coats of the guard and messengers.

Ibgrave bought disused vestments from churches during Edward's reign. He and his workshop were paid for embroidering the coats of 109 guards in March 1552. A payment made to Ibgrave after Edward's death, on 20 October 1553, includes quilting the king's hose, and pinking and cutting (slashing) six taffeta doublets.

Ibgrave died in 1557.

== Family ==
Ibgrave's Estate Act 1606
- Act of Parliament
- Parliament of England
- Long title: An Act for confirmation of an agreement betwixt Edward lord Bruce and Michael Doyly and others, for the lands late of William Ibgrave deceased.
- Citation: 4 Jas. 1. c. 6 Pr.
- Territorial extent: England and Wales

Dates
- Royal assent: 4 July 1607
- Commencement: 18 November 1606 (Note: Start of session.)

Status: Current legislation

Ibgrave was married twice, his wives's names were Alice and Ellen. The lands in Hertfordshire were inherited by his sons Giles (or Elisha), who married Bennet Clitherow, and Thomas Ibgrave, and the family of his brother Robert Ibgrave. The lands return to the crown for want of heirs and in 1606, James VI and I, granted them to Edward Bruce, 1st Lord Kinloss. The transaction required a private act of Parliament, Ibgrave's Estate Act 1606 (4 Jas. 1. c. 6 Pr.).

Sancia, Sence, or Sencippa Ibgrave, recorded in 1569 making a presentation to appoint a vicar to the parish of Sarratt, was the daughter of Bennet Clitherow and Giles Ibgrave. Bennet's first husband was Robert Smithwick of Lees Langley.
