= Henry Brinklow =

English polemicist

Henry Brinklow, also Brynklow or Brinkelow (died 1545 or 1546), was an English polemicist. As he worked for a number of years under the pseudonym Roderyck, or Roderigo, Mors, he may also be referred to by this name in contemporaneous accounts.

== Life as Henry Brinklow ==
Henry Brinklow was the eldest of nine children of Robert Brinklow, a farmer in Kintbury, Berkshire. Robert died in 1543, leaving a widow Sibyl (or Isabel), who appears to have been the mother of Edward Butler of Reading by a former marriage, and may not have been the mother of Robert's children. Sibyl died in 1545, also leaving a will.

Brinklow lived most of his life in London, where he could observe many of the political changes in England. He became a mercer – at that time probably meaning a merchant in cloth and similar commodities. This career brought him into company with Evangelical Christians, such as the Mercers' Company chaplain and reformer Richard Harris, and was to influence his favour for evangelical reform.

Brinklow claimed to have been a Franciscan friar. If so, then at some point he left the order and married. He claimed to have been for a time exiled from England for his outspoken criticism of the bishops.

If Brinklow wrote before 1542, it was not published. It was only at this time that the work of 'Roderyck Mors' began to be distributed in England.

Brinklow died on or shortly before 20 January 1546. At death he was worth at least £350, and bequeathed £109 13s. 4d. This included £5 to the godly learned men … that wt goddes worde doo fight ayenst Antechrist and his membres, and £9 to the remission of debt. He also left a widow, Margery (d. 1557), and a son, John. His will, of 20 June 1545, was as vigorous as much of his writing, demanding a funeral without pomp or ceremony, and that his wife not wear mourning. She made three further marriages: first (as his second wife) to Stephen Vaughan, at Calais, who died in 1549; secondly (c. 1550) to George Rolle, Esquire, and thirdly (before 1556) to Sir Leonard Chamberlain of Woodstock, Oxfordshire.

Throughout his life, Brinklow was never publicly associated with the writings of Roderick Mors. It was not until the 1550s that it was revealed, by the churchman and controversialist John Bale, that Mors was Brinklow's pseudonym. The pseudonym was carefully protected; Brinklow had all his work printed abroad. Bishop Stephen Gardiner suspected that Mors was a pseudonym, but that it was the creation of George Joye.

== Polemics, beliefs, and opinions: life as 'Roderick Mors' ==
In 1544 or 1545 he published the work "The complaynt of Roderyck Mors, somtyme a grey fryre, vnto the parliament howse of Ingland his natural cuntry for the redresse of certen wicked lawes, euel customs ad cruell decreys".

The work includes sections on economic reform ("Of inhansing of rent ys by land lordes &ce."), land management ("Of the incolosing of parkys, forestys, chasys. &ce."), church reform ("A lamentacyon for that the body and tayle of the pope is not banisshed with his name"), and militant enforcement of Biblical law ("Of the sellyng of wardys for mariage, wher of ensueth adultery, which owght to be ponysshed by deth").

Roderick Mors, Brinklow's pseudonym, acquired a biography of his own, claiming to be an exiled former Franciscan, a story that fitted the fact that Brinklow had his work printed abroad.

He was one of, and perhaps the first of, a number of Christian commentators, the so-called commonwealth men, to arise in the 1530s and 1540s as a reaction against conditions and changes in the period. He attributed contemporary disorders and greed to economic roots, and recommended the King to use his wealth to keep his subjects prosperous. He demanded that traditional religion be completely swept away – 'forcked cappes' (bishops) and all – and criticised Henry VIII for his ambivalence over reform. Where the government and the church were at odds, he condemned both. For example, he reviled monasteries, but equally reviled the Dissolution of the Monasteries – despite also putting forward a "programme for full-scale redistribution of ecclesiastical wealth". Calls for religious reform were accompanied by equally radical calls for social reform, such as "reform of rents, enclosures, wardships, and of the heresy and treason laws; for a stipendiary bar and judiciary; and for the two houses of parliament to be merged".

He was also concerned with the state of neglect in medicine, and around 1542, proposed that revenue gained from the Church – this was the time of the Dissolution – should be diverted into medical facilities, stating that phisicyans and surgeons ... to lyue upon their stipend (fixed and regular payment) only, without taking any peny of there pore, upon payne of losing both his earys and his stypend also , and, according to one source, were to live on this payment on pain of mutilation.

His ideas and beliefs were published in three or four polemics. He is the definite author of three works, though one is lost. The two surviving are The Complaynt of Roderyck Mors (1542), and Lamentacion of a Christian (1542). It is possible that he is the author of A Supplication of the Poore Commons, printed in the year of his death, 1546. His known works went through at least eight editions.

== Quotations ==
- First come, first served. (found in the Complaynt of Roderick Mors)
- What loss feels he that wots not what he loses? (Complaynt of Roderick Mors)
