= Nicholas Bullingham =

British bishop

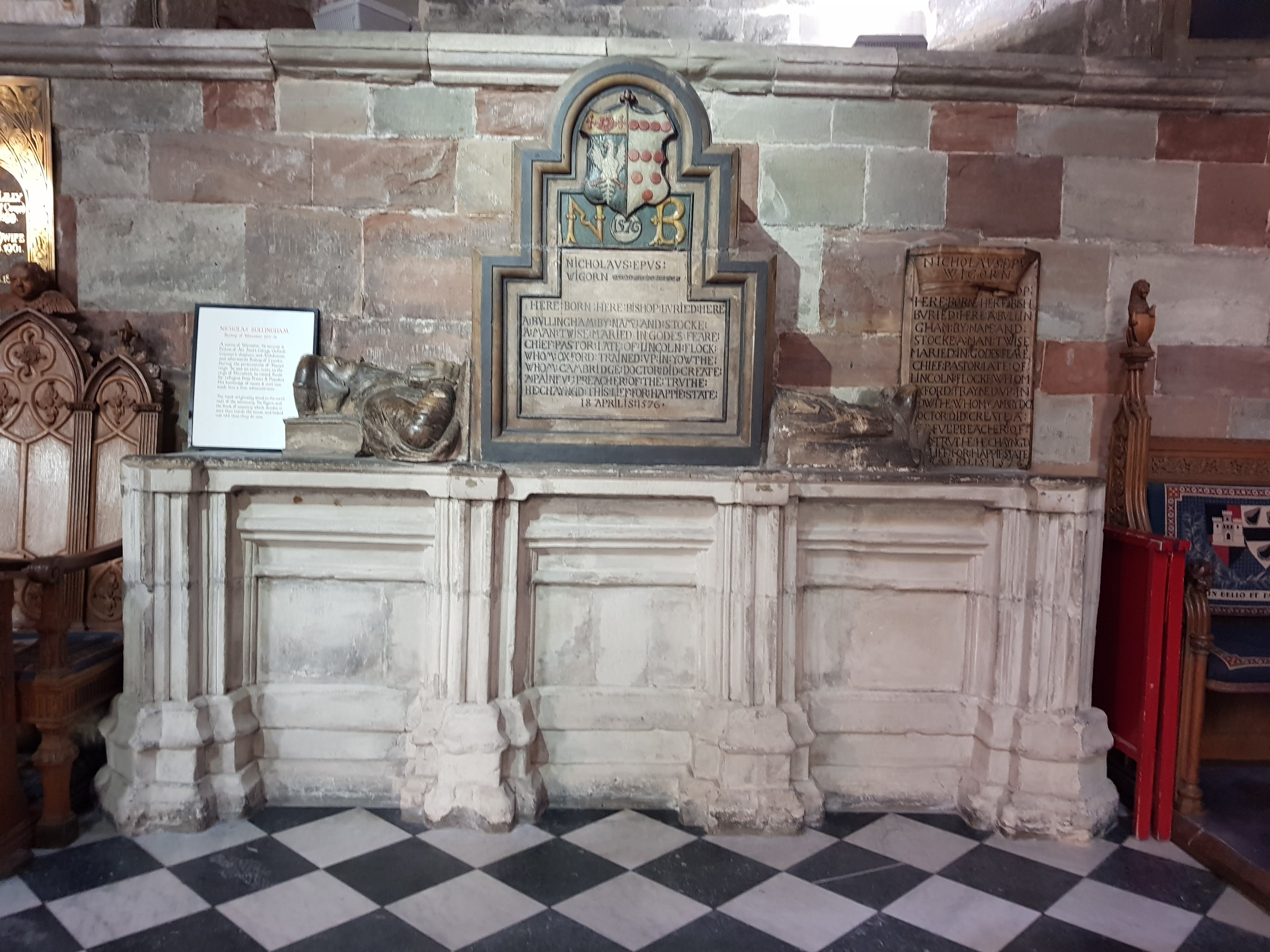
Monument in Worcester Cathedral to Nicholas Bullingham, Bishop of Worcester. Arms: Bullingham (Azure, an eagle displayed argent in his beak a branch of beech or on a chief of the last a rose between two crosses bottonny gules) impaling See of Worcester. The arms of the See normally appears at dexter (position of greatest honour), not as here at sinister

Nicholas Bullingham (or Bollingham) (c. 1520–1576) was an English cleric who became the Bishop of Lincoln and Bishop of Worcester.

== Life ==
Nicholas Bullingham was born in Worcester around 1520. He was sent to the Royal Grammar School Worcester. In 1536 he became a Fellow of All Souls College, Oxford, graduating BCL in 1541, DCL in 1546 (or he supplicated for DCL but was not admitted). He was created LL.D. at Cambridge in 1559 (incorporated DCL at Oxford in 1566).

After his education in law, Bullingham entered the church, becoming Archdeacon of Lincoln in 1549. On the accession of Queen Mary, Bullingham, being married and Protestant, was deprived of the archdeaconry and his other church positions, and went into exile at Emden.

On the accession of Queen Elizabeth, Bullingham returned to England, resumed his church positions, and became a private chaplain to Archbishop Parker, who often consulted him on legal matters. He became Bishop of Lincoln in 1560, and finally returned to his old city as Bishop of Worcester until his death in 1576. While in Worcester, he greeted the Queen on her visit to the city in 1575.

Bullingham is buried in Worcester Cathedral in an unusual tomb, with an inscribed tablet on his stomach.

== Marriages and issue ==
Bullingham married firstly Margaret Sutton (d.1566), daughter of Hamond Sutton of Washingborough, Lincolnshire, by whom he had two sons, Francis Bullingham MP (1553–c.1636) and Nicholas Bullingham (1566–1639), and two daughters, both named Susan, who died in 1561 and 1564 respectively.

He married secondly, about 1569, Elizabeth Lok (1535–c.1581). She was the widow of the London mercer and alderman Richard Hill (d.1568), by whom she had had thirteen children, and was the daughter of Sir William Lok and his first wife, Alice Spenser (d.1522). By his second wife Bullingham had a son, John (baptized 1570).

== Notes ==
Church of England titles
Preceded by Thomas Watson	Bishop of Lincoln; 1560–1571	Succeeded by Thomas Cooper
Preceded by Edwin Sandys	Bishop of Worcester; 1571–1576	Succeeded by John Whitgift
