= Michael Lok =

English merchant (c. 1532 – c. 1621)

Michael Lok (or Locke; c. 1532 – c. 1621) was an English merchant and traveller, and the principal backer of Sir Martin Frobisher's voyages in search of the Northwest Passage He was the governor of the failed Cathay Company, formed with Frobisher in 1577.

== Family ==
Michael Lok was born in Cheapside in London, by his own account in 1532. He was one of the nineteen children, and the youngest of the five surviving sons of Sir William Lok (1480–1550), gentleman usher to Henry VIII and mercer, sheriff and alderman of London, by his second wife, Katherine Cooke (d.1537), daughter of Sir Thomas Cooke of Wiltshire. One of his sisters was the Protestant exile, Rose Lok (1526–1613). His father, Sir William Lok, was the great-great-great-grandfather of the philosopher John Locke (1632–1704).

== Career ==
He was kept at school until 1545, when he was thirteen, at which time he was sent by his father to Flanders and France 'to learn those languages and to know the world' He spent seven years in Flanders 'following the trade of merchandise', which Williamson suggests was his term of apprenticeship to the Company of Merchant Adventurers. In 1552 he went to Spain, following his business as a merchant, and there and at Lisbon saw the trade of the Spanish West Indies, and the East Indies. During 24 years he travelled, and was captain of a ship of one thousand tons trading in the Levant.

In the course of his voyages he met Martin Frobisher and in 1576 entered into a scheme for a voyage in search of the Northwest Passage, supplying many of the necessaries at his own cost. When the Cathay Company was formed in March 1577, Lok was appointed governor for six years. The venture, however, entirely failed, and in January 1579 he had to petition the Privy Council for relief and assistance. In June 1581 he was again petitioning the Privy Council, from the Fleet Prison, condemned at the suit of William Borough to pay for a ship bought for Frobisher's last voyage, though he claimed the debt was not his; he was also bound for a larger debt of the Cathay Company. In 1614–15 he was still being sued for a debt for stores supplied to Frobisher's ships.

In 1587–8 Lok was in Dublin, and in 1592 went out to Aleppo as consul for the Levant Company for four years. After two years, however, the appointment was summarily cancelled, by the intrigues—as Lok asserted—of one Dorrington, in the employment of Sir John Spenser, alderman of London. He claimed the full amount of his salary for the four years; but in 1599 he was still claiming it. On 29 June 1608 Lok wrote to Robert Cecil, 1st Earl of Salisbury sending him intelligence of the warlike preparations of the king of Spain.

== Works ==
An essay, An conveniens sit Matrimonium inter Puellam et Senem from 1583, might imply that he was meditating a third marriage in his old age. He also translated into English part of Peter Martyr's Historie of the West Indies, which was published in 1612.

== Marriages and issue ==
Lok married firstly, about 1562, Jane Wilkinson, the daughter of William Wilkinson (d.1543), mercer and Sheriff of London in 1538, by Joan North (d.1556), only sister of Edward North, 1st Baron North, and daughter of Roger North (d.1509) and Christian Warcop. Lok's first wife died in 1571, leaving several children, of whom eight are named in her will (dated 9 February 1570–1, proved by Lok 6 April 1571). Their first son, Zachariah Lok was Member of Parliament (MP) for Ipswich in 1593 and Southwark, London in 1601.

Lok married secondly Margery Perient (died c.1583), daughter of George Perient of Shropshire and Hertfordshire, widow of Cæsar Adelmare (d.1569), and mother of Sir Julius Cæsar the judge. In 1579 Lok described himself as having a wife and fifteen children.
