= Hand cannon =

Early firearm, 13th-15th century

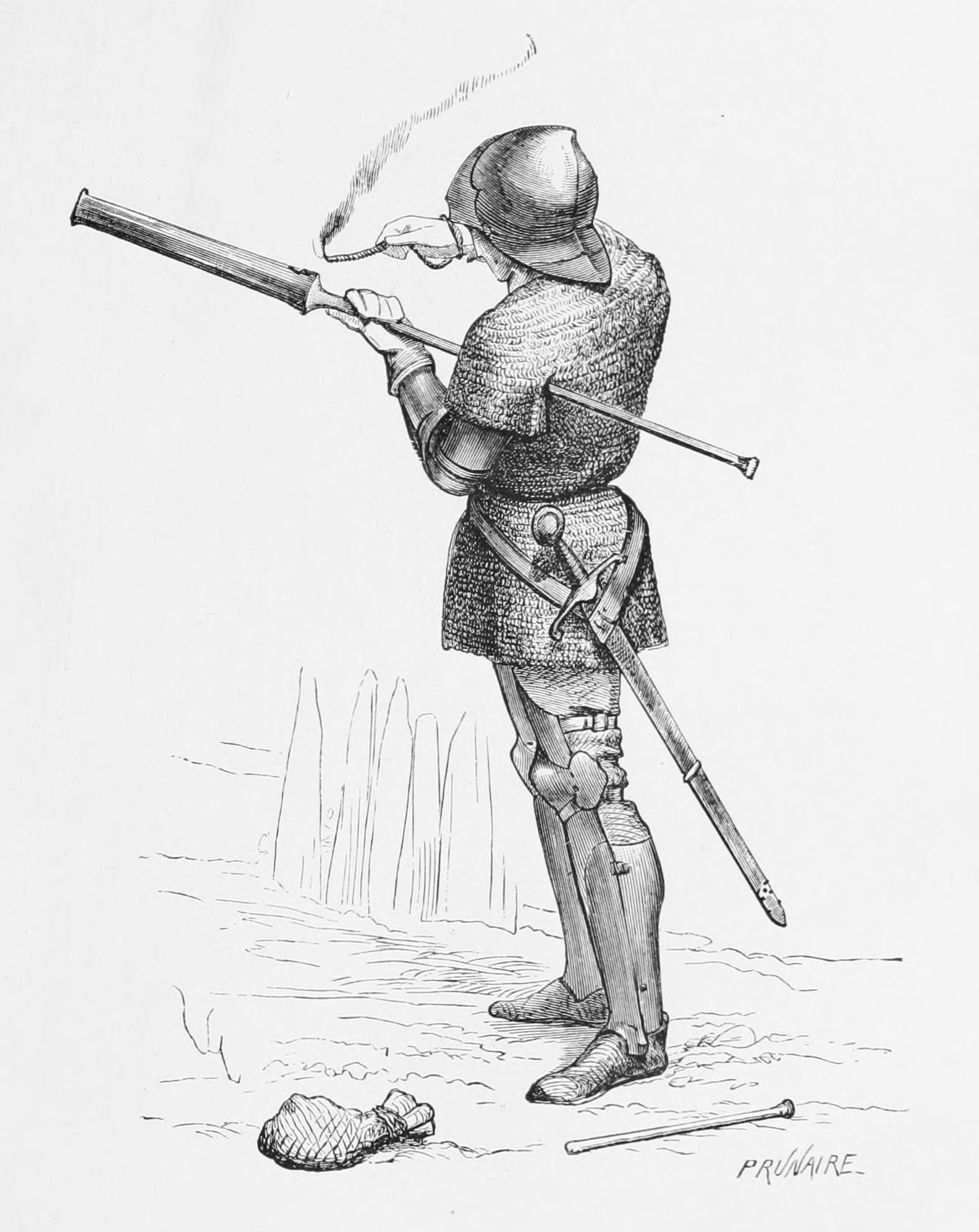
Swiss soldier firing a hand cannon, with powder bag and ramrod at his feet, c. 15th century (produced in 1874)

The hand cannon (simplified Chinese: 火铳; traditional Chinese: 火銃; pinyin: huǒchòng or 手铳; 手銃; shǒuchòng), also known as the gonne or handgonne, is the first true firearm and the successor of the fire lance. It is the oldest type of small arms, as well as the most mechanically simple form of metal barrel firearms. Unlike matchlock firearms it requires direct manual external ignition through a touch hole without any form of firing mechanism. It may also be considered a forerunner of the handgun. The hand cannon was widely used in China from the 13th century onward and later throughout Eurasia in the 14th century. In 15th century Europe, the hand cannon evolved to become the matchlock arquebus, which became the first firearm to have a trigger.

== History ==
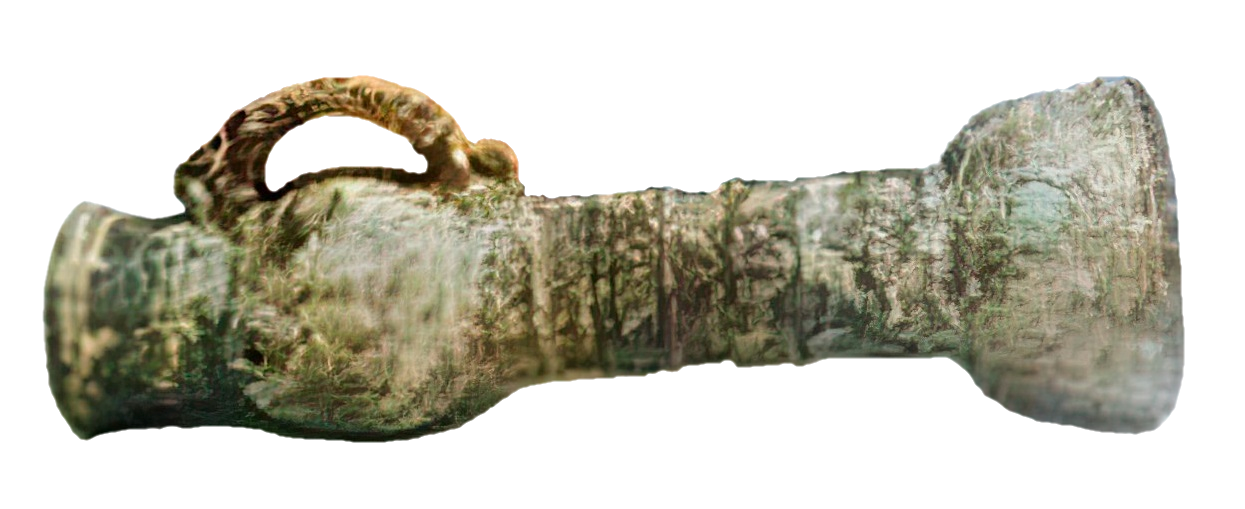
A Chinese-style "bowl-mouth cannon" found in Java, presumably brought there by the Mongol invasion of Java in 1293 or a Javanese version of it.

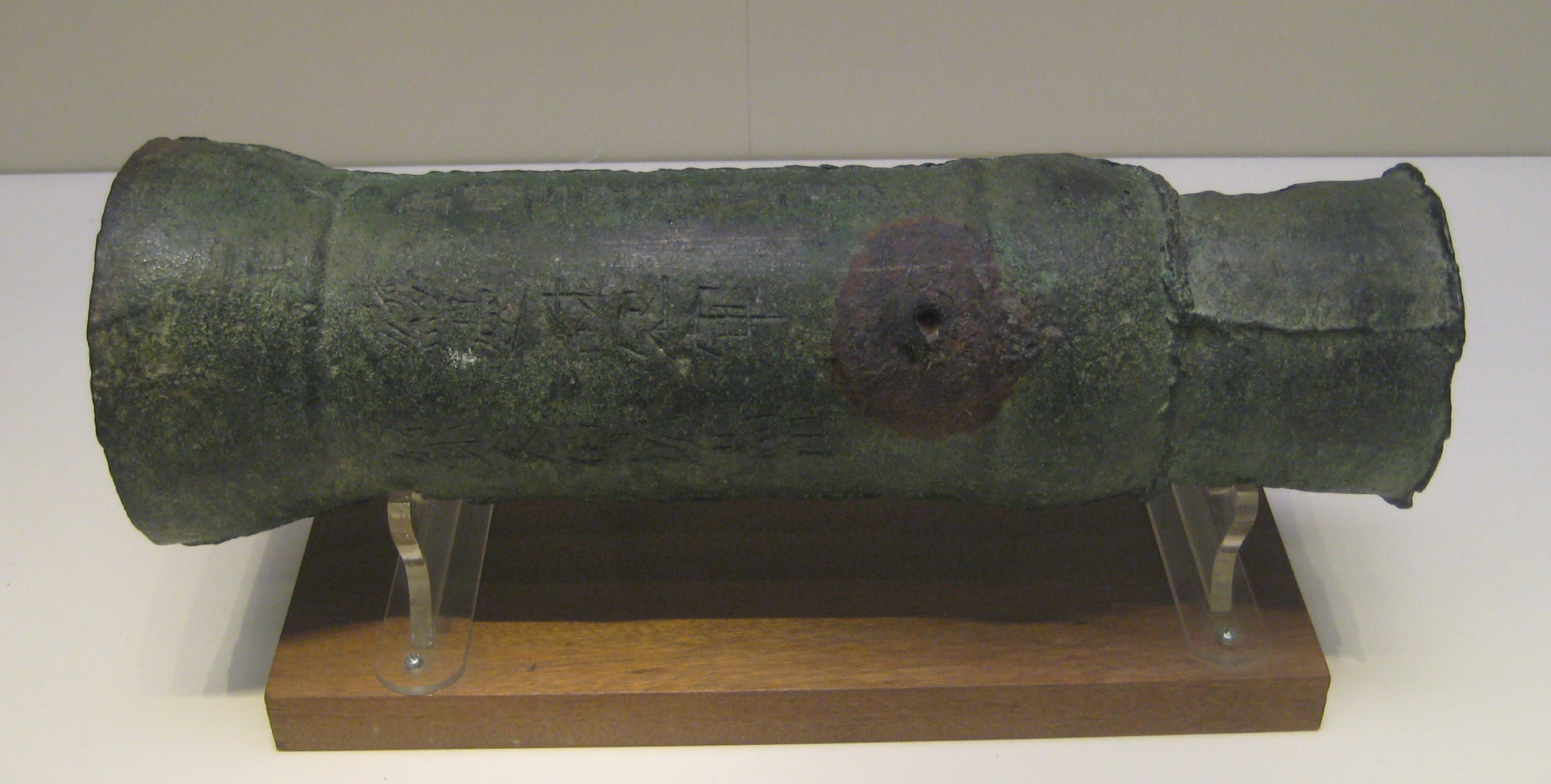
Bronze cannon with inscription dated the 3rd year of the Zhiyuan era (1332) of the Yuan Dynasty (1271–1368); discovered in Beijing in 1935.

=== China ===
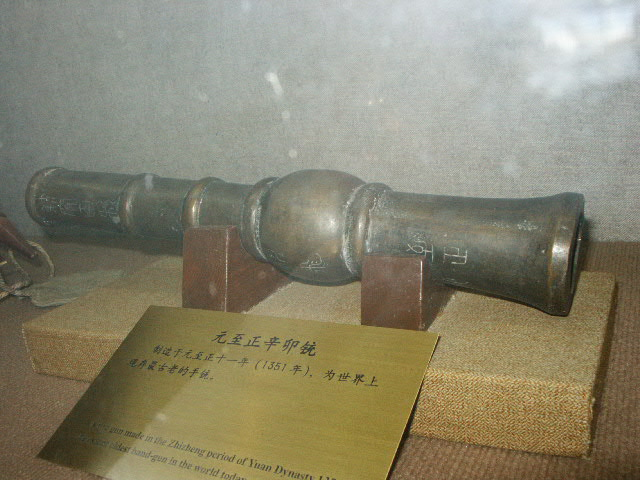
Yuan dynasty bronze hand cannon, 1351

==== Dazu Rock Carvings ====
The earliest artistic depiction of what might be a hand cannon—a rock sculpture found among the Dazu Rock Carvings—is dated to 1128, much earlier than any recorded or precisely dated archaeological samples, so it is possible that the concept of a cannon-like firearm has existed since the 12th century. This has been challenged by others such as Liu Xu, Cheng Dong, and Benjamin Avichai Katz Sinvany. According to Liu, the weight of the cannon would have been too much for one person to hold, especially with just one arm, and points out that fire lances were being used a decade later at the Siege of De'an. Cheng Dong believes that the figure depicted is actually a wind spirit letting air out of a bag rather than a cannon emitting a blast. Stephen Haw also considered the possibility that the item in question was a bag of air but concludes that it is a cannon because it was grouped with other weapon-wielding sculptures. Sinvany concurred with the wind bag interpretation and that the cannonball indentation was added later on.

==== Evolution ====
The first cannons were likely an evolution of the fire lance. In 1259 a type of "fire-emitting lance" (tūhuǒqiāng 突火槍) made an appearance. According to the History of Song: "It is made from a large bamboo tube, and inside is stuffed a pellet wad (zǐkē 子窠). Once the fire goes off it completely spews the rear pellet wad forth, and the sound is like a bomb that can be heard for five hundred or more paces." The pellet wad mentioned is possibly the first true bullet in recorded history depending on how bullet is defined, as it did occlude the barrel, unlike previous co-viatives (non-occluding shrapnel) used in the fire lance. Fire lances transformed from the "bamboo- (or wood- or paper-) barreled firearm to the metal-barreled firearm" to better withstand the explosive pressure of gunpowder. From there it branched off into several different gunpowder weapons known as "eruptors" in the late 12th and early 13th centuries, with different functions such as the "filling-the-sky erupting tube" which spewed out poisonous gas and porcelain shards, the "hole-boring flying sand magic mist tube" (zuànxuéfēishāshénwùtǒng 鑽穴飛砂神霧筒) which spewed forth sand and poisonous chemicals into orifices, and the more conventional "phalanx-charging fire gourd" which shot out lead pellets.

==== First guns ====
Hand cannons first saw widespread use in China sometime during the 13th century and spread from there to the rest of the world. In 1287 Yuan Jurchen troops deployed hand cannons in putting down a rebellion by the Mongol prince Nayan. The History of Yuan reports that the cannons of Li Ting's soldiers "caused great damage" and created "such confusion that the enemy soldiers attacked and killed each other." The hand cannons were used again in the beginning of 1288. Li Ting's "gun-soldiers" or chòngzú (銃卒) were able to carry the hand cannons "on their backs". The passage on the 1288 battle is also the first to coin the name chòng (銃) with the metal radical jīn (金) for metal-barrel firearms. Chòng was used instead of the earlier and more ambiguous term huǒtǒng (fire tube; 火筒), which may refer to the tubes of fire lances, proto-cannons, or signal flares. Hand cannons may have also been used in the Mongol invasions of Japan. Japanese descriptions of the invasions talk of iron and bamboo pào causing "light and fire" and emitting 2–3,000 iron bullets. The Nihon Kokujokushi, written around 1300, mentions huǒtǒng (fire tubes) at the Battle of Tsushima in 1274 and the second coastal assault led by Holdon in 1281. The Hachiman Gudoukun of 1360 mentions iron pào "which caused a flash of light and a loud noise when fired." The Taiheki of 1370 mentions "iron pào shaped like a bell." Mongol troops of Yuan dynasty carried Chinese cannons to Java during their 1293 invasion.

The oldest extant hand cannon bearing a date of production is the Xanadu Gun, which contains an era date corresponding to 1298. The Heilongjiang hand cannon is dated a decade earlier to 1288, corresponding to the military conflict involving Li Ting, but the dating method is based on contextual evidence; the gun bears no inscription or era date. Another cannon bears an era date that could correspond with the year 1271 in the Gregorian Calendar, but contains an irregular character in the reign name. Other specimens also likely predate the Xanadu and Heilongjiang guns and have been traced as far back as the late Western Xia period (1214–1227), but these too lack inscriptions and era dates (see Wuwei bronze cannon).

Li Ting chose gun-soldiers (chòngzú), concealing those who bore the huǒpào on their backs; then by night he crossed the river, moved upstream, and fired off (the weapons). This threw all the enemy's horses and men into great confusion ... and he gained a great victory.

— History of Yuan

=== Spread ===
The earliest reliable evidence of cannons in Europe appeared in 1326 in a register of the municipality of Florence and evidence of their production can be dated as early as 1327. The first recorded use of gunpowder weapons in Europe was in 1331 when two mounted German knights attacked Cividale del Friuli with gunpowder weapons of some sort. By 1338 hand cannons were in widespread use in France. One of the oldest surviving weapons of this type is the "Loshult gun", a 10 kg (22 lb) Swedish example from the mid-14th century. In 1999, a group of British and Danish researchers made a replica of the gun and tested it using four period-accurate mixes of gunpowder, firing both 1.88 kg (4.1 lb) arrows and 184 g (6.5 oz) lead balls with 50 g (1.8 oz) charges of gunpowder. The velocities of the arrows varied from 63 m/s (210 ft/s) to 87 m/s (290 ft/s) with max ranges of 205 m (673 ft) to 360 m (1,180 ft), while the balls achieve velocities of between 110 m/s (360 ft/s) to 142 m/s (470 ft/s) with an average range of 630 m (2,070 ft). The first English source about handheld firearm (hand cannon) was written in 1473.

Although evidence of cannons appears later in the Middle East than Europe, fire lances were described earlier by Hasan al-Rammah between 1240 and 1280, and appeared in battles between Muslims and Mongols in 1299 and 1303. Hand cannons may have been used in the early 14th century. An Arabic text dating to 1320–1350 describes a type of gunpowder weapon called a midfa which uses gunpowder to shoot projectiles out of a tube at the end of a stock. Some scholars consider this a hand cannon while others dispute this claim. The Nasrid army besieging Elche in 1331 made use of "iron pellets shot with fire." According to Paul E. J. Hammer, the Mamluks certainly used cannons by 1342. According to J. Lavin, cannons were used by Moors at the siege of Algeciras in 1343. Shihab al-Din Abu al-Abbas al-Qalqashandi described a metal cannon firing an iron ball between 1365 and 1376.

Description of the drug (mixture) to be introduced in the madfa'a (cannon) with its proportions: barud, ten; charcoal two drachmes, sulphur one and a half drachmes. Reduce the whole into a thin powder and fill with it one third of the madfa'a. Do not put more because it might explode. This is why you should go to the turner and ask him to make a wooden madfa'a whose size must be in proportion with its muzzle. Introduce the mixture (drug) strongly; add the bunduk (balls) or the arrow and put fire to the priming. The madfa'a length must be in proportion with the hole. If the madfa'a was deeper than the muzzle's width, this would be a defect. Take care of the gunners. Be careful

— Rzevuski MS, possibly written by Shams al-Din Muhammad, c. 1320–1350

Cannons are attested to in India starting from 1366. The Goryeo kingdom in Korea acquired knowledge of gunpowder from China by 1372 and started producing hand cannons and cannons by 1377. In Southeast Asia Đại Việt soldiers were using hand cannons at the very latest by 1390 when they employed them in killing Champa king Che Bong Nga. A Chinese observer recorded the Javanese use of hand cannon for marriage ceremony in 1413 during Zheng He's voyage. Japan was already aware of gunpowder warfare due to the Mongol invasions during the 13th century, but did not acquire a cannon until a monk took one back to Japan from China in 1510, and firearms were not produced until 1543, when the Portuguese introduced matchlocks which were known as tanegashima to the Japanese. The art of firing the Japanese hand cannon known as ōdzutsu (大筒) has remained as a Ko-budō martial arts form.

=== Middle East ===
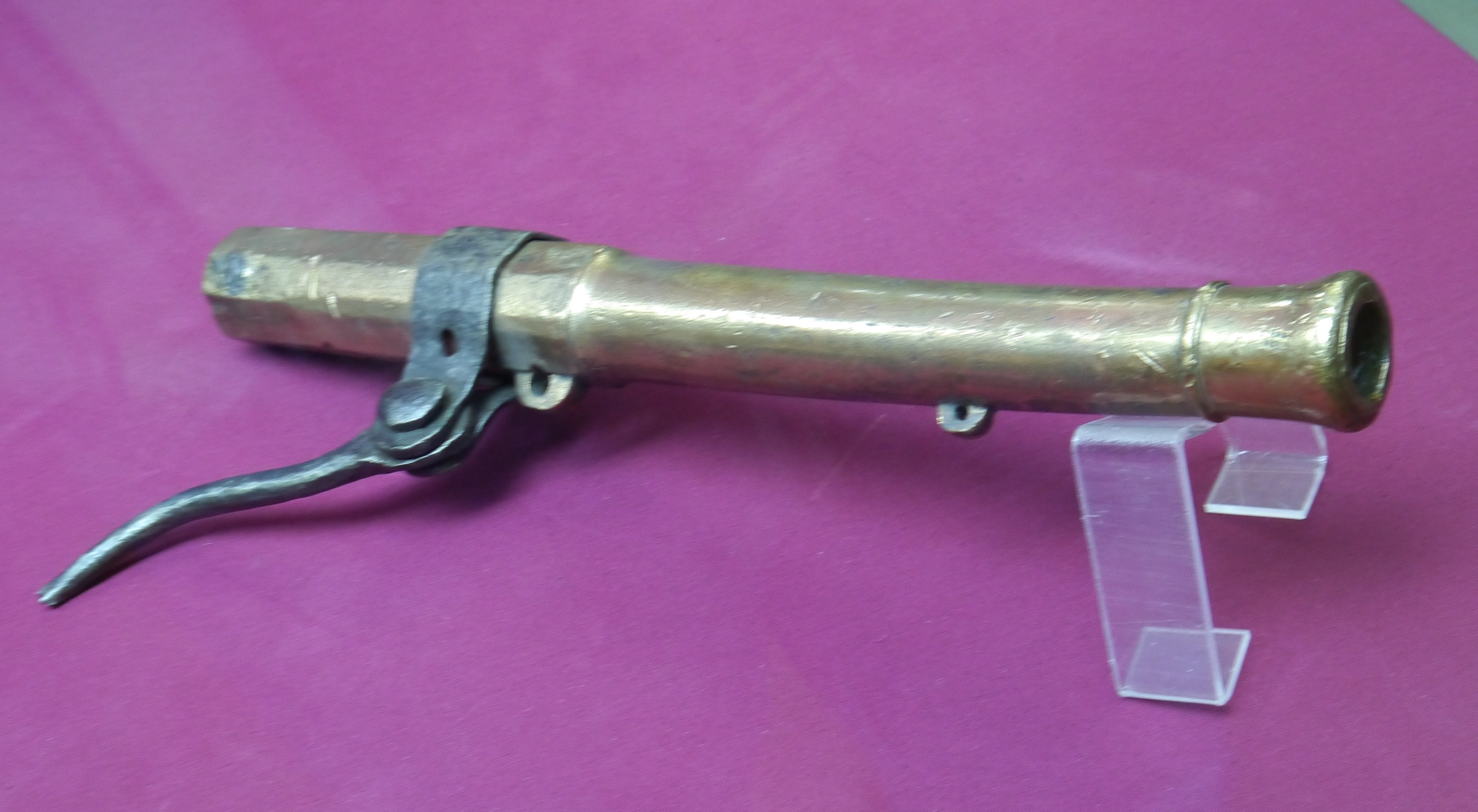
Turkish hand cannon

The earliest surviving documentary evidence for the use of the hand cannon in the Islamic world are from several Arabic manuscripts dated to the 14th century. The historian Ahmad Y. al-Hassan argues that several 14th-century Arabic manuscripts, one of which was written by Shams al-Din Muhammad al-Ansari al-Dimashqi (1256–1327), report the use of hand cannons by Mamluk-Egyptian forces against the Mongols at the Battle of Ain Jalut in 1260. However, Hassan's claim contradicts other historians who claim hand cannons did not appear in the Middle East until the 14th century.

Iqtidar Alam Khan argues that it was the Mongols who introduced gunpowder to the Islamic world, and believes cannons only reached Mamluk Egypt in the 1370s. According to Joseph Needham, fire lances or proto-guns were known to Muslims by the late 13th century and early 14th century. However the term midfa, dated to textual sources from 1342 to 1352, cannot be proven to be true hand-guns or bombards, and contemporary accounts of a metal-barrel cannon in the Islamic world do not occur until 1365. Needham also concludes that in its original form the term midfa refers to the tube or cylinder of a naphtha projector (flamethrower), then after the invention of gunpowder it meant the tube of fire lances, and eventually it applied to the cylinder of hand-gun and cannon. Similarly, Tonio Andrade dates the textual appearance of cannon in Middle-Eastern sources to the 1360s. David Ayalon and Gabor Ágoston believe the Mamluks had certainly used siege cannon by the 1360s, but earlier uses of cannon in the Islamic World are vague with a possible appearance in the Emirate of Granada by the 1320s, however evidence is inconclusive.

Khan claims that it was invading Mongols who introduced gunpowder to the Islamic world and cites Mamluk antagonism towards early riflemen in their infantry as an example of how gunpowder weapons were not always met with open acceptance in the Middle East. Similarly, the refusal of their Qizilbash forces to use firearms contributed to the Safavid rout at Chaldiran in 1514.

=== Arquebus ===
Early European hand cannons, such as the socket-handgonne, were relatively easy to produce; smiths often used brass or bronze when making these early gonnes. The production of early hand cannons was not uniform; this resulted in complications when loading or using the gunpowder in the hand cannon. Improvements in hand cannon and gunpowder technology—corned powder, shot ammunition, and development of the flash pan—led to the invention of the arquebus in late 15th-century Europe.

== Design and features ==
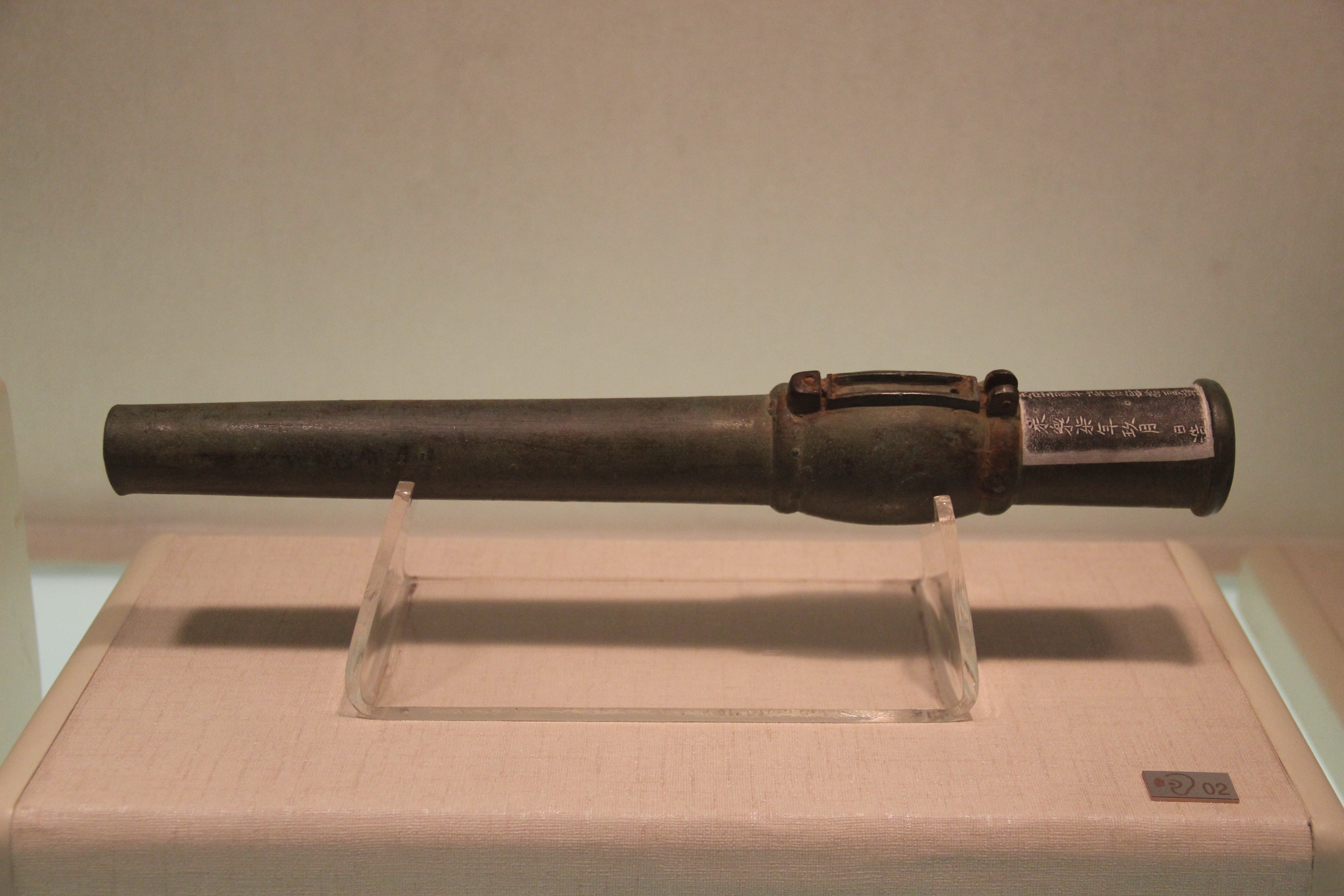
Ming dynasty hand cannon, 1409

The hand cannon consists of a barrel, a handle, and sometimes a socket to insert a wooden stock. Extant samples show that some hand cannons also featured a metal extension as a handle.

The hand cannon could be held in two hands, but another person is often shown aiding in the ignition process using smoldering wood, coal, red-hot iron rods, or slow-burning matches. The hand cannon could be placed on a rest and held by one hand, while the gunner applied the means of ignition himself.

Projectiles used in hand cannons were known to include rocks, pebbles, and arrows. Eventually stone projectiles in the shape of balls became the preferred form of ammunition, and then they were replaced by iron balls from the late 14th to 15th centuries.

Later hand cannons have been shown to include a flash pan attached to the barrel and a touch hole drilled through the side wall instead of the top of the barrel. The flash pan had a leather cover and, later on, a hinged metal lid, to keep the priming powder dry until the moment of firing and to prevent premature firing. These features were carried over to subsequent firearms.

== Gallery ==
=== Asia ===
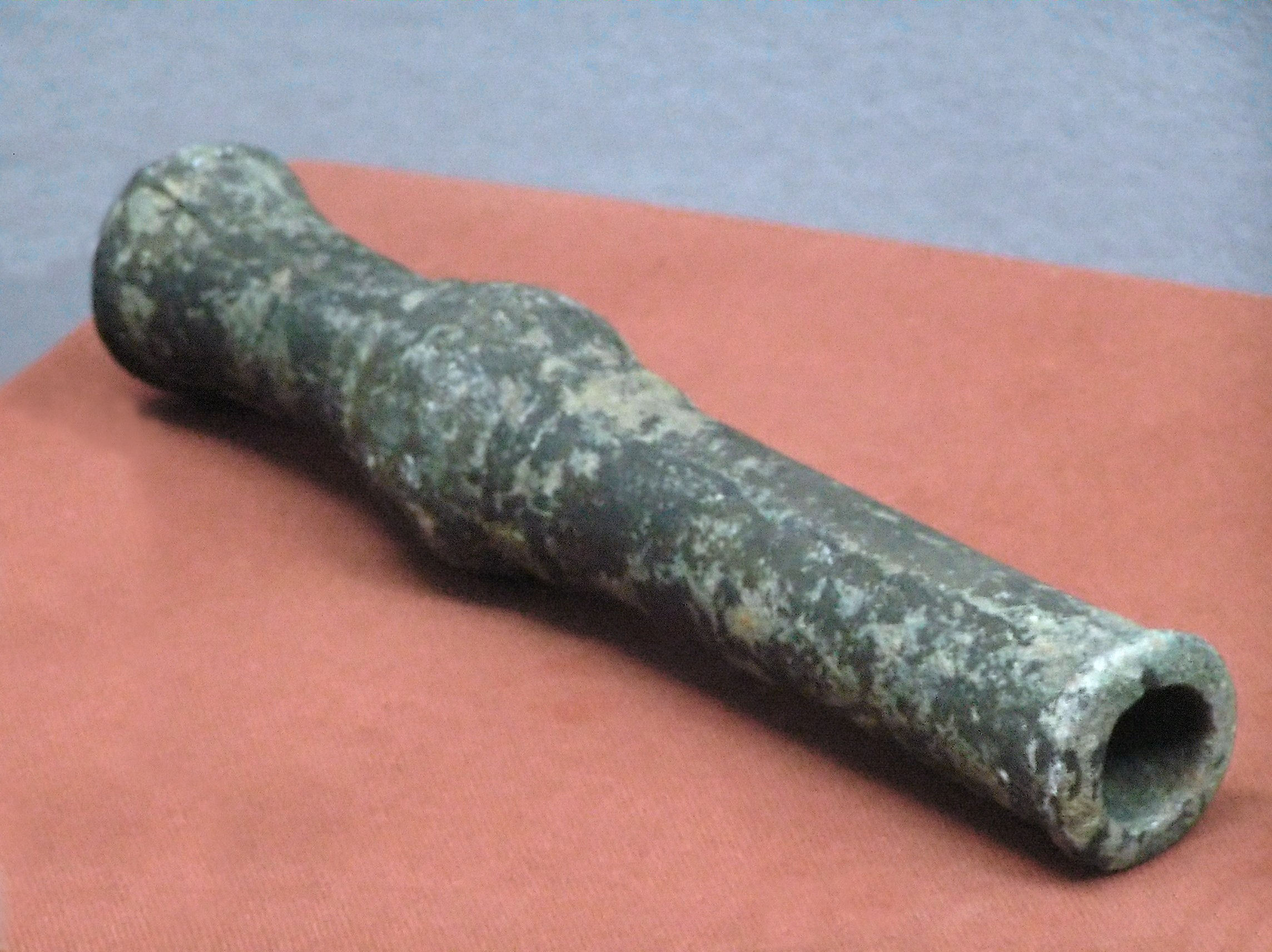
Hand cannon from the Mongol Yuan dynasty (1271–1368)

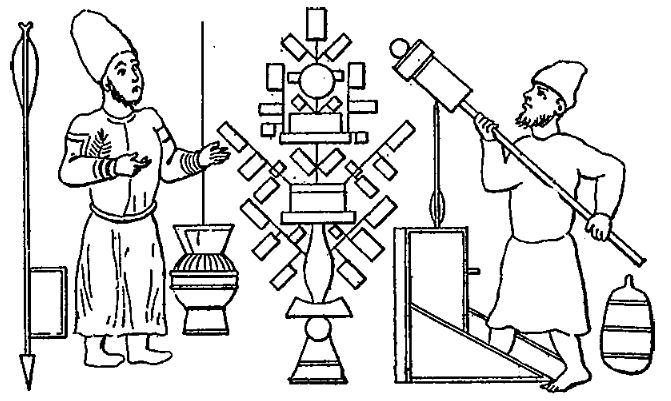
Arabic illustration showing a gunpowder arrow on the left, fireworks in the middle, and a midfa on the right, from Rzevuski MS, c. 1320–1350

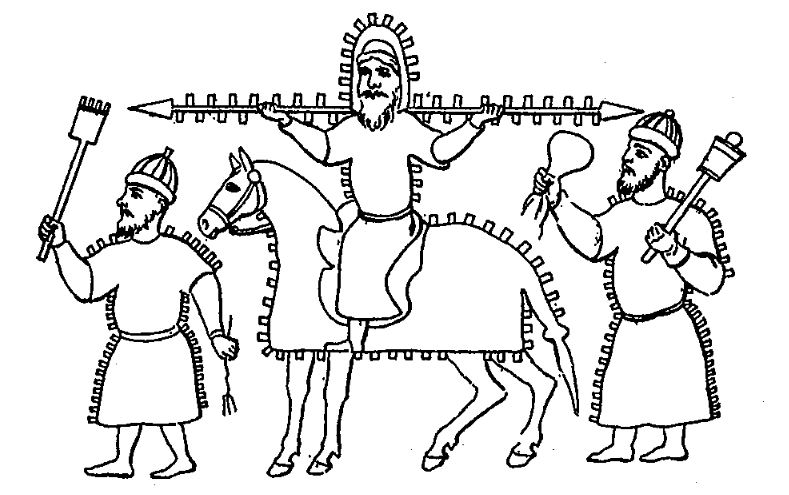
Arabic illustration showing soldiers holding a fire tube on the left, a naphtha flask/bomb and midfa on the right, and a rider holding gunpowder cartridges in the middle, from Rzevuski MS, c. 1320–1350

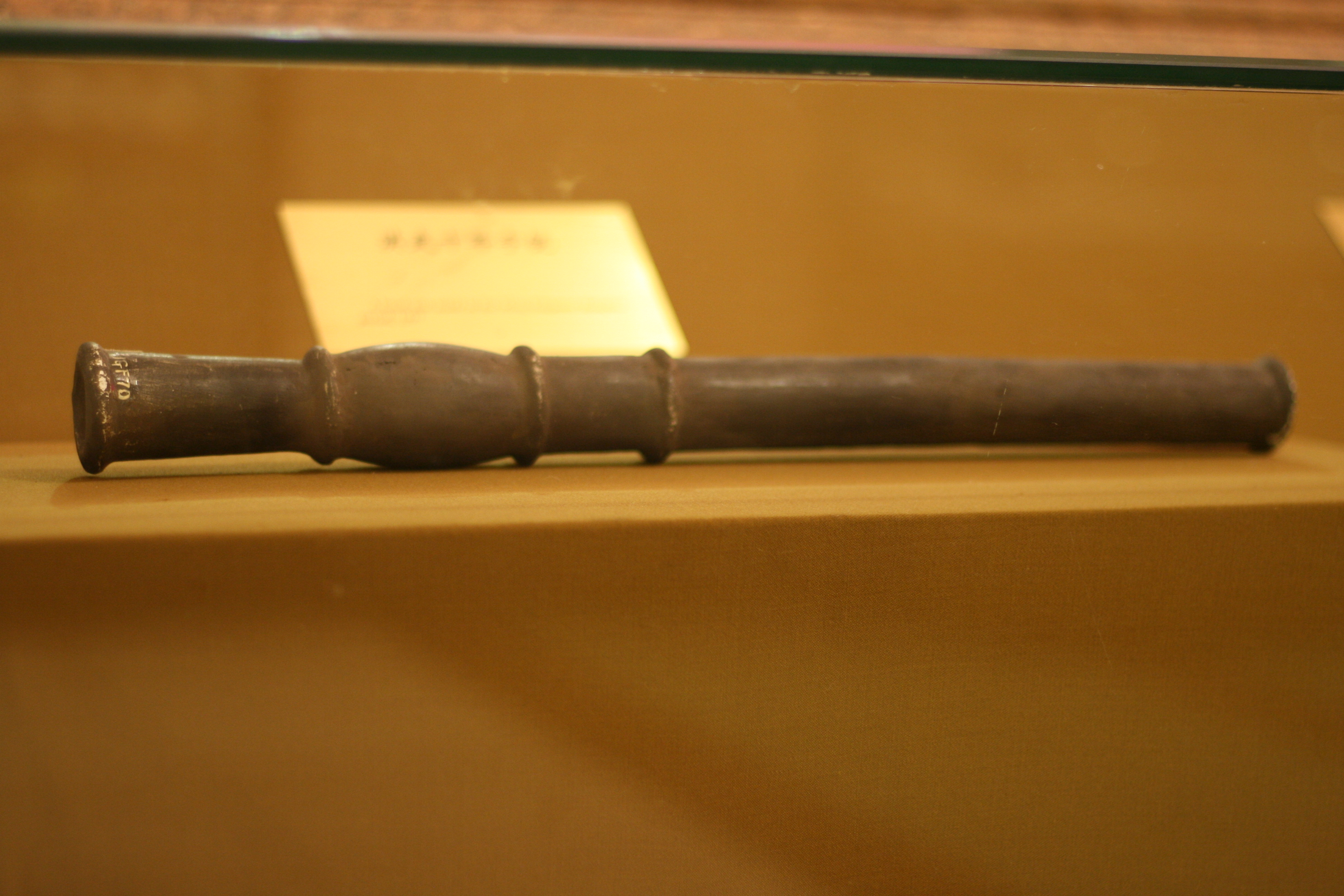
Hand cannon, Ming dynasty, 1377

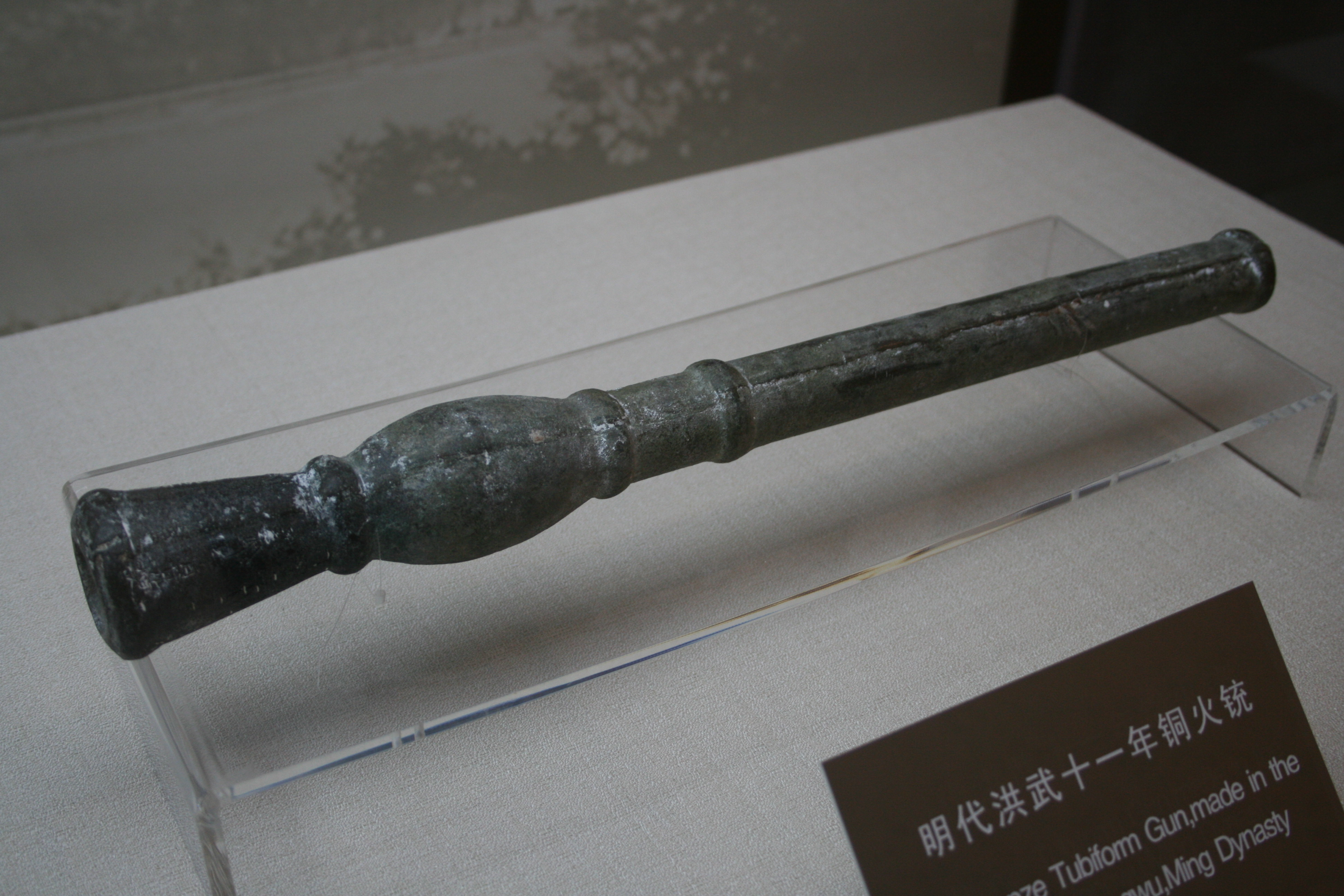
Hand cannon, Ming dynasty, 1379

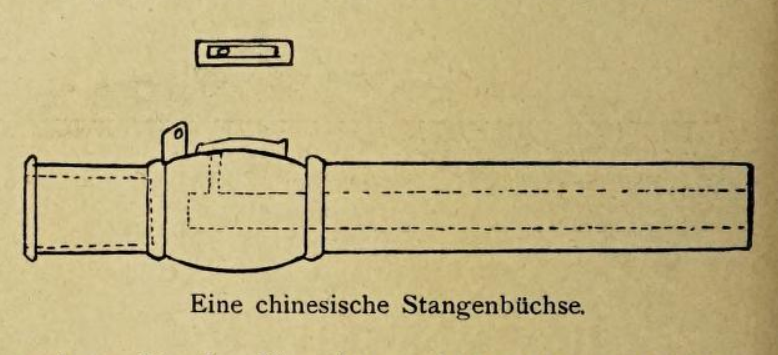
Drawing of a Chinese pole gun found in Java, 1421. It weighed 2.252 kg, length of 357 mm, and caliber of 16 mm. This gun features a rain cover connected with hinge, which is now missing. The hinge is still preserved.

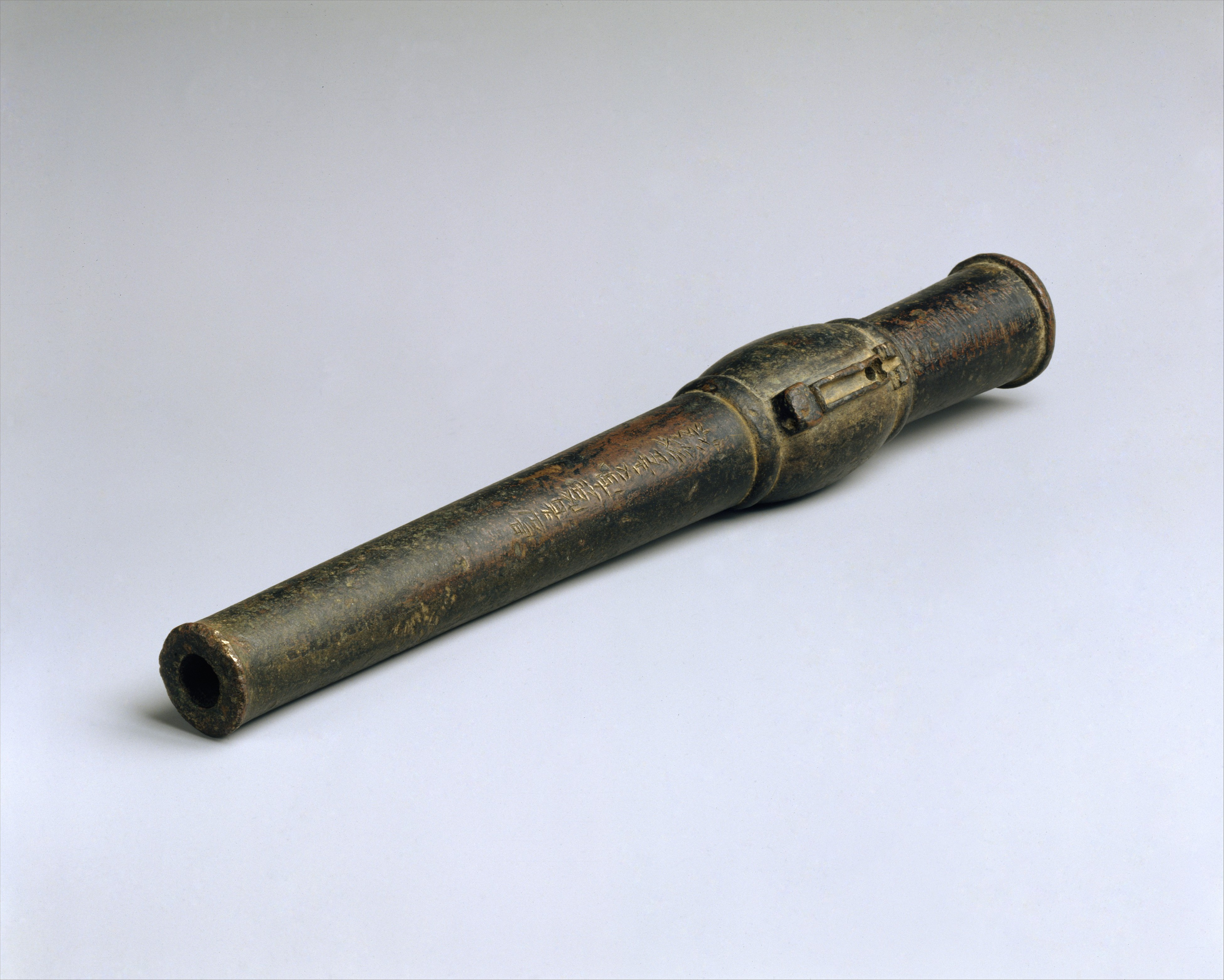
Chinese hand cannon, dated 1424

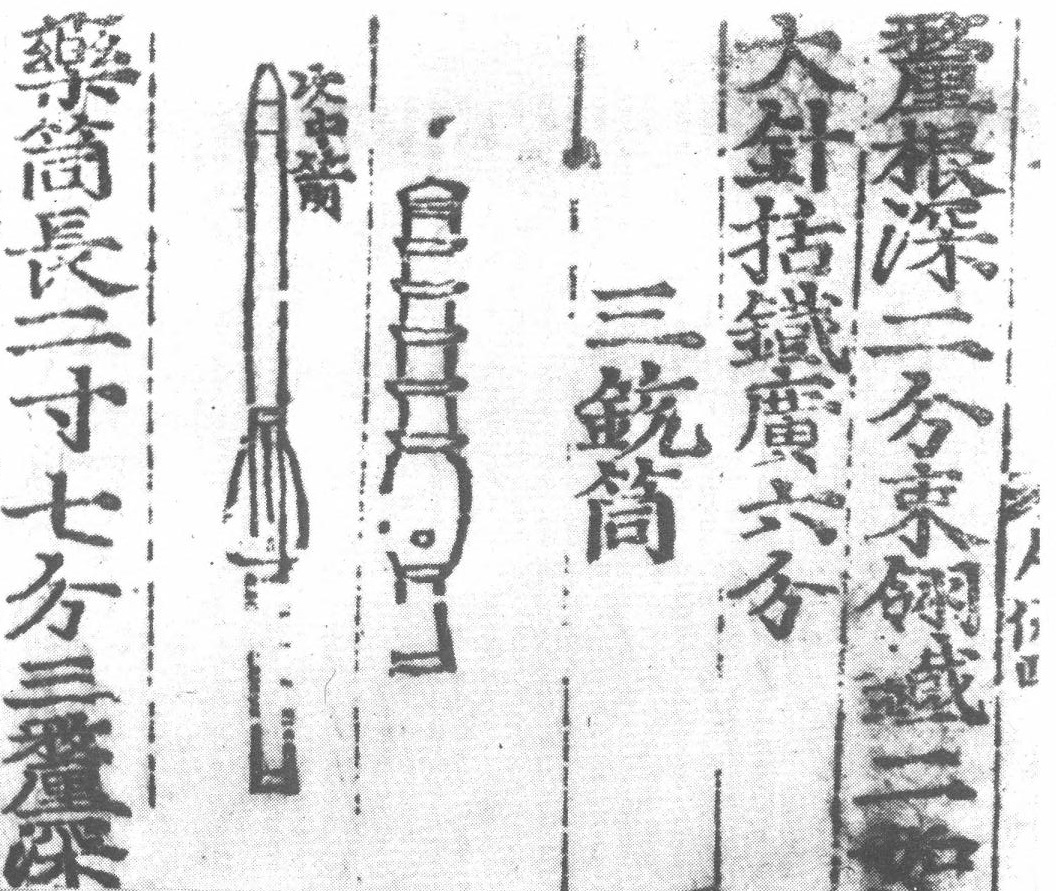
A page of the Korean Kukcho Orye-ui (c. 1474) showing an early type of hand cannon (chhung thung or chongtong) and the bolt-like arrow and metal fins which was shot from it

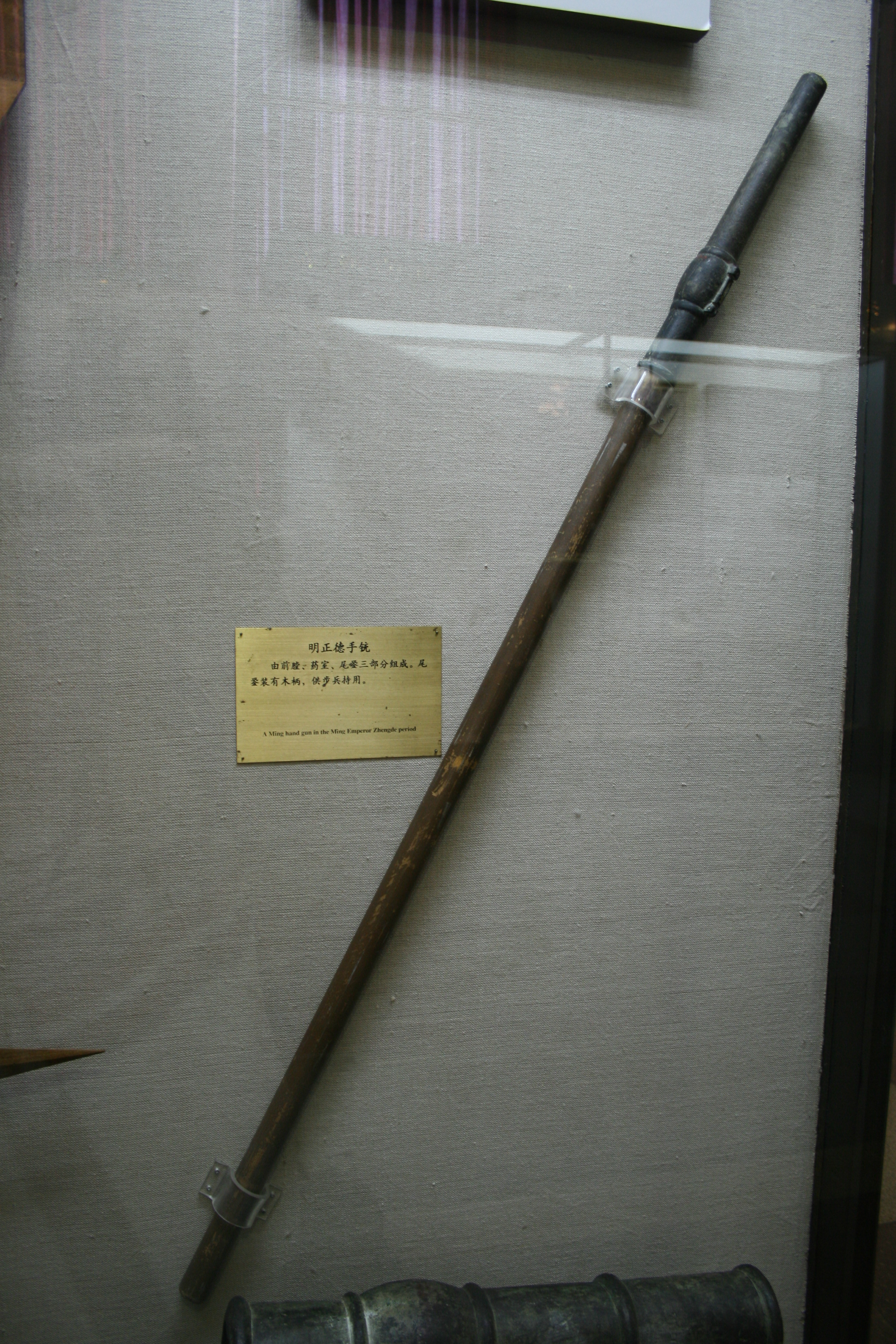
A socketed Ming hand cannon, 1505–1521.

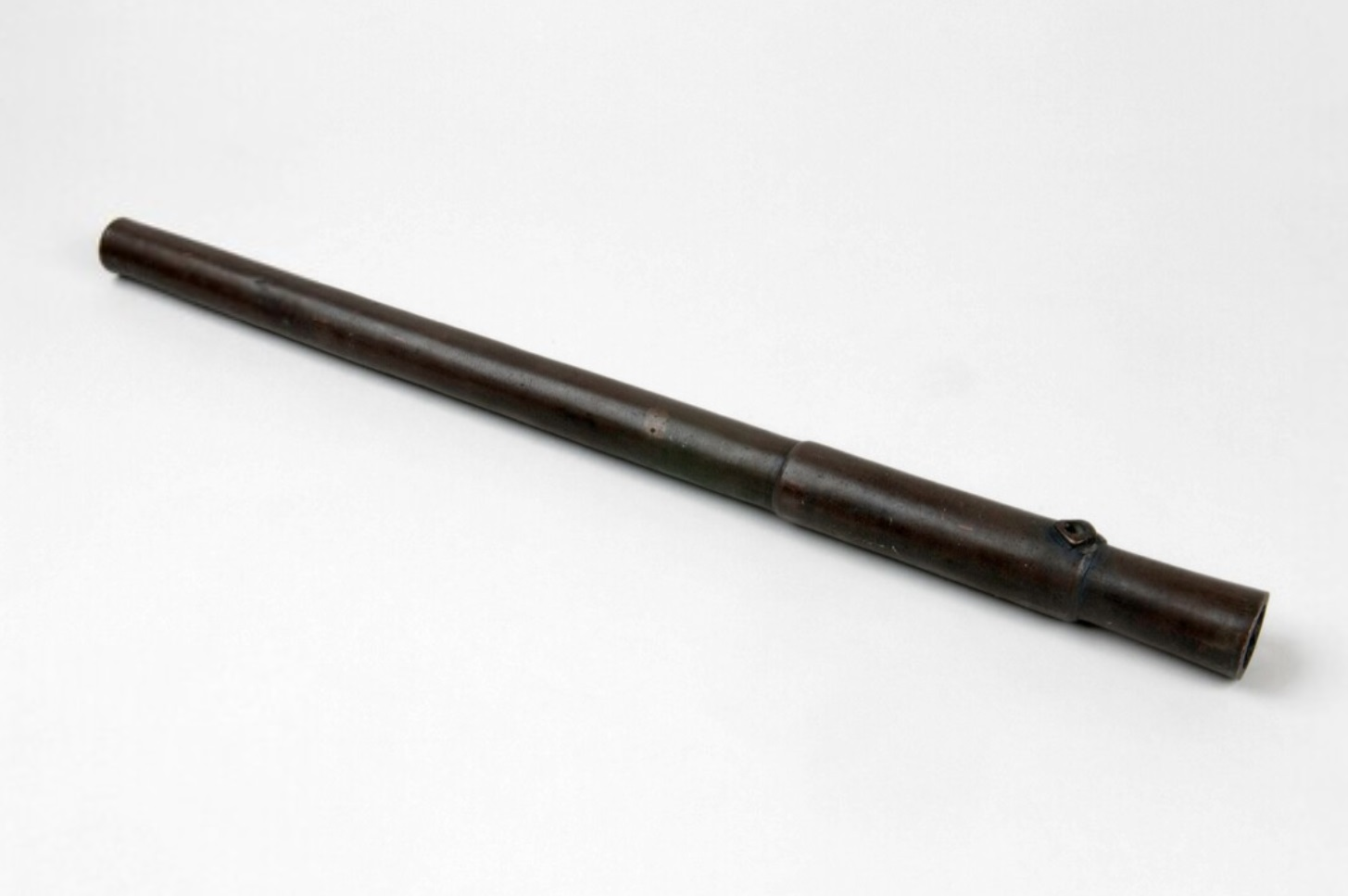
Indonesian bronze bedil tombak, age unknown

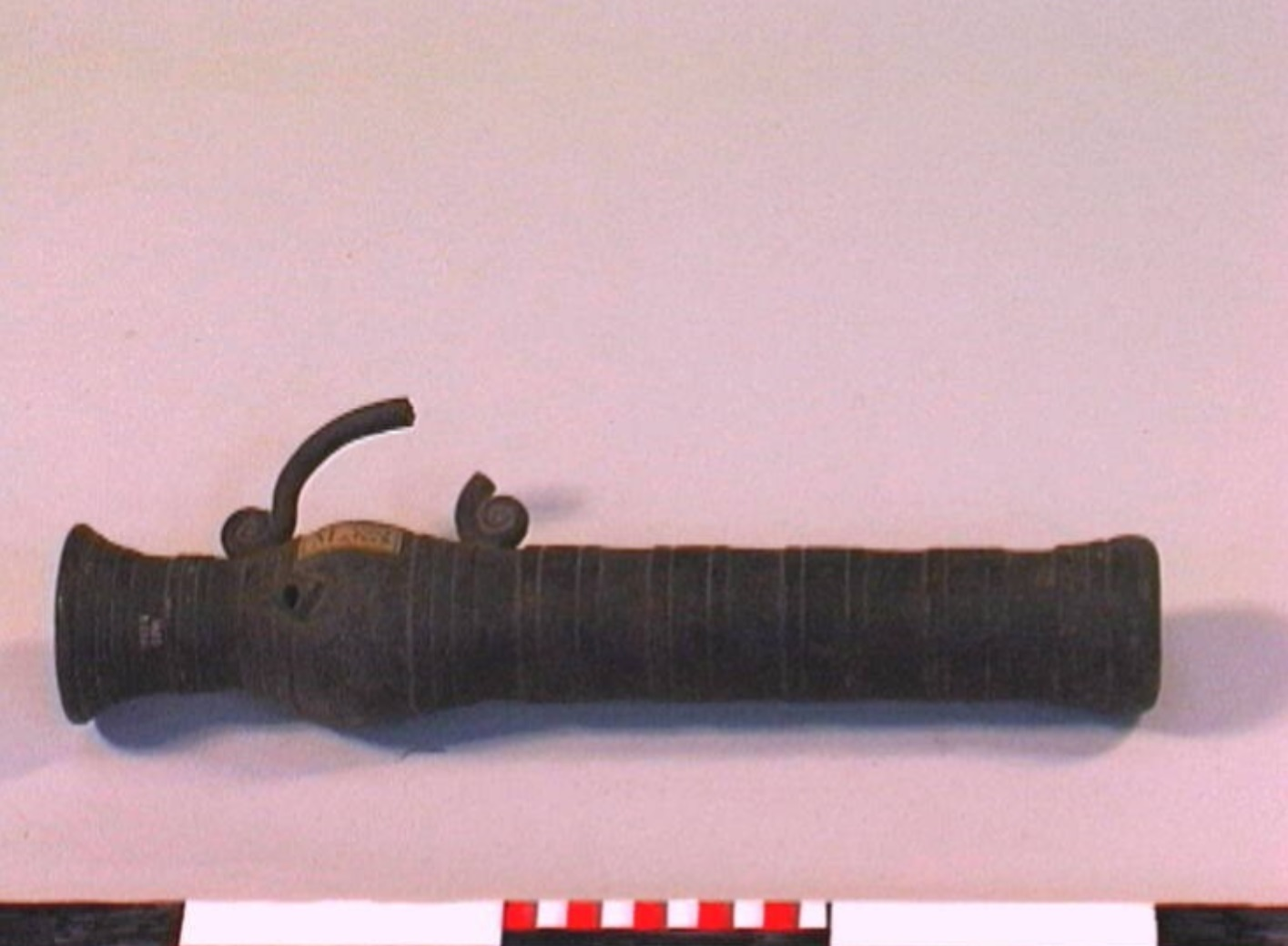
Indonesian iron bedil tombak from Majalengka, West Java, age unknown

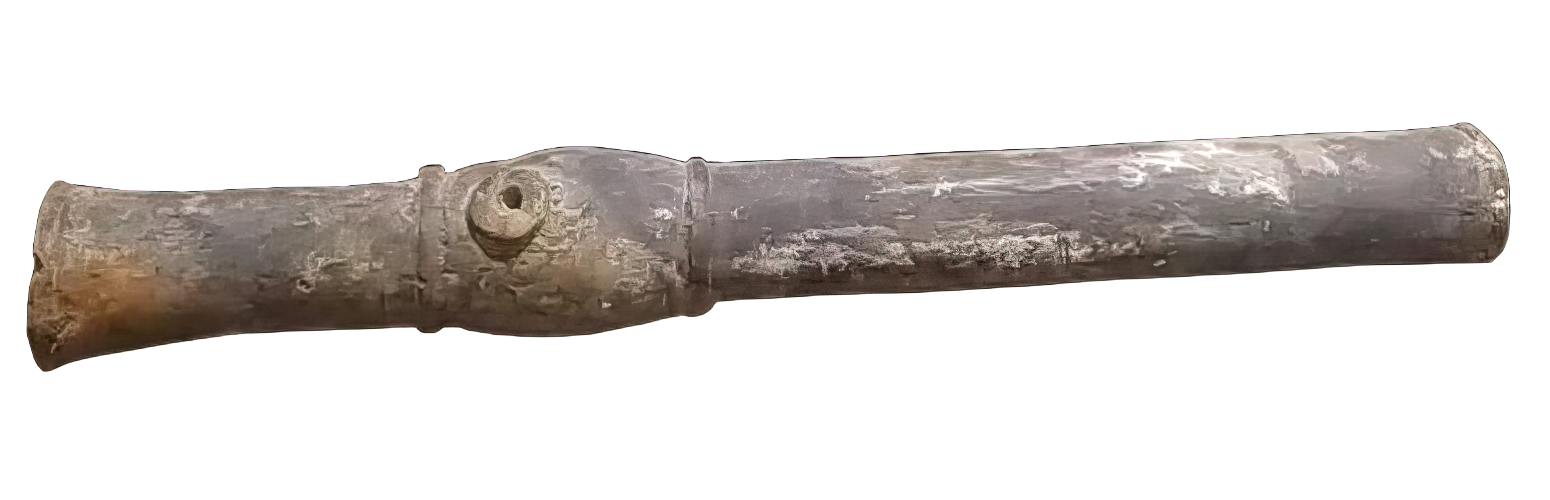
A bedil (or cetbang), recovered from the Brantas River

=== Europe ===
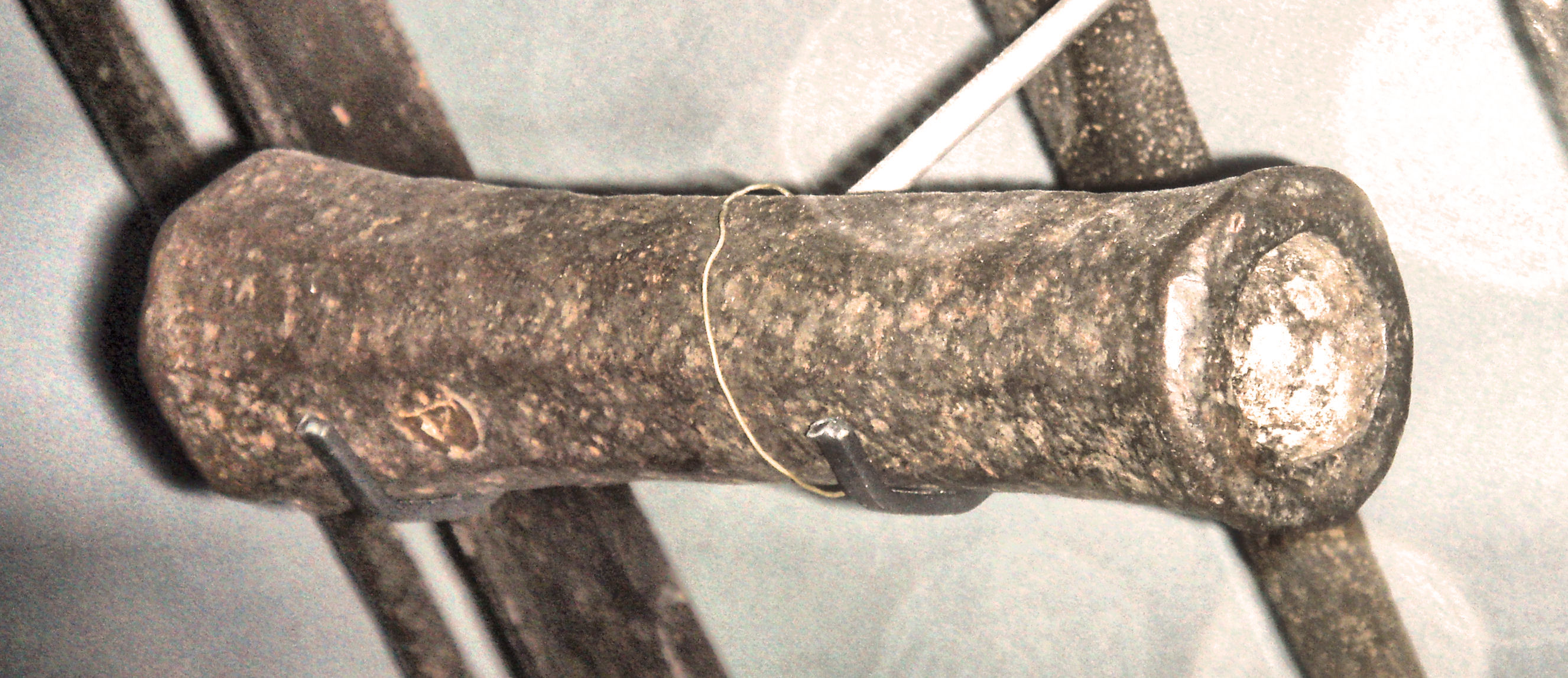
Western European handgun, 1380. It is 18 cm long and weighs 1.04 kg. It was fixed to a wooden pole to facilitate manipulation. Musée de l'Armée.

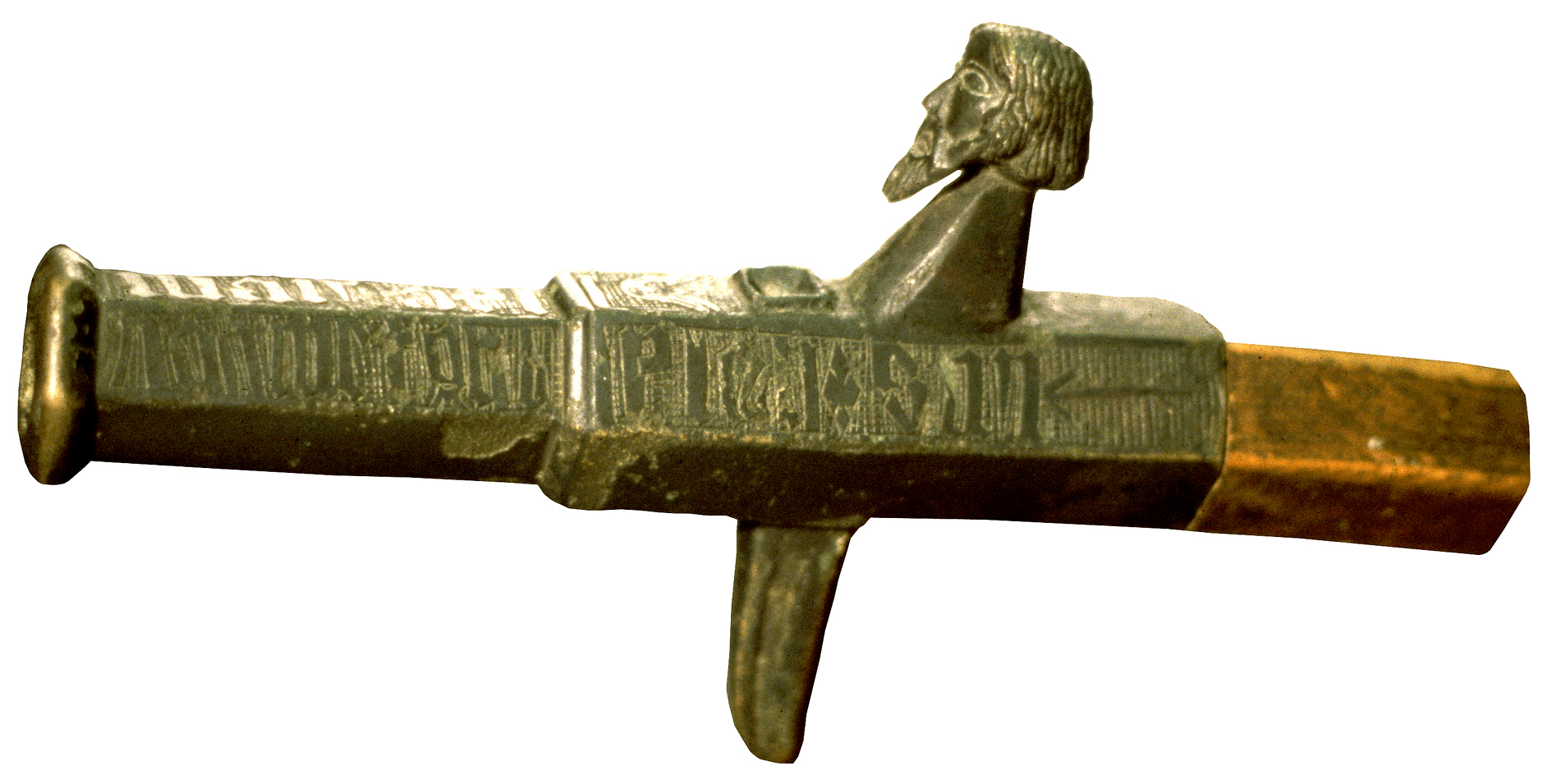
The Mörkö gun is an early Swedish firearm discovered by a fisherman in the Baltic Sea at the coast of Södermanland near Nynäs in 1828. It has been dated to c. 1390.

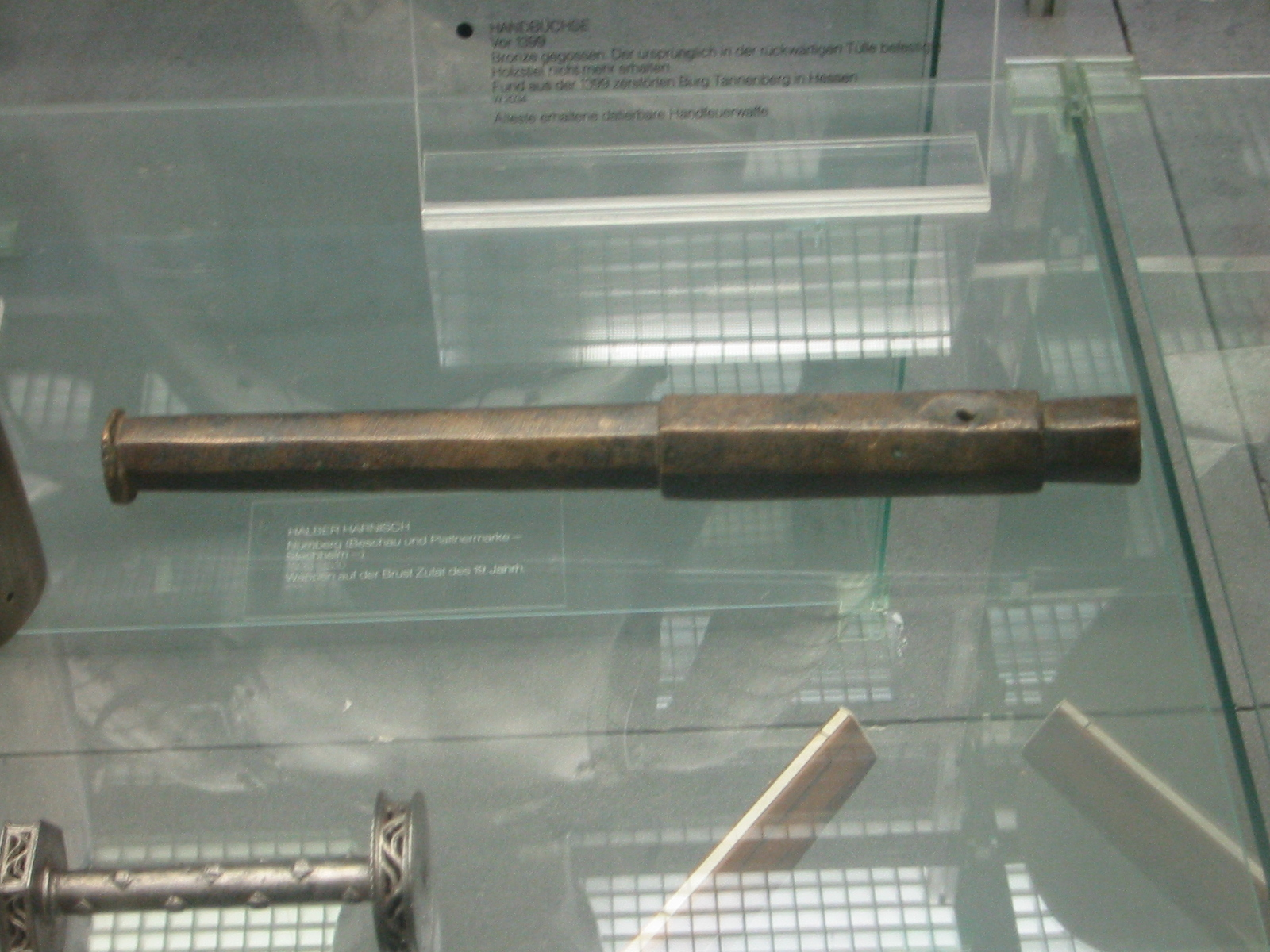
The Tannenberg handgonne is a cast bronze firearm. Muzzle bore 15–16 mm. Found in the water well of Tannenberg castle in Seeheim-Jugenheim, which was destroyed in 1399. Oldest surviving firearm from Germany.

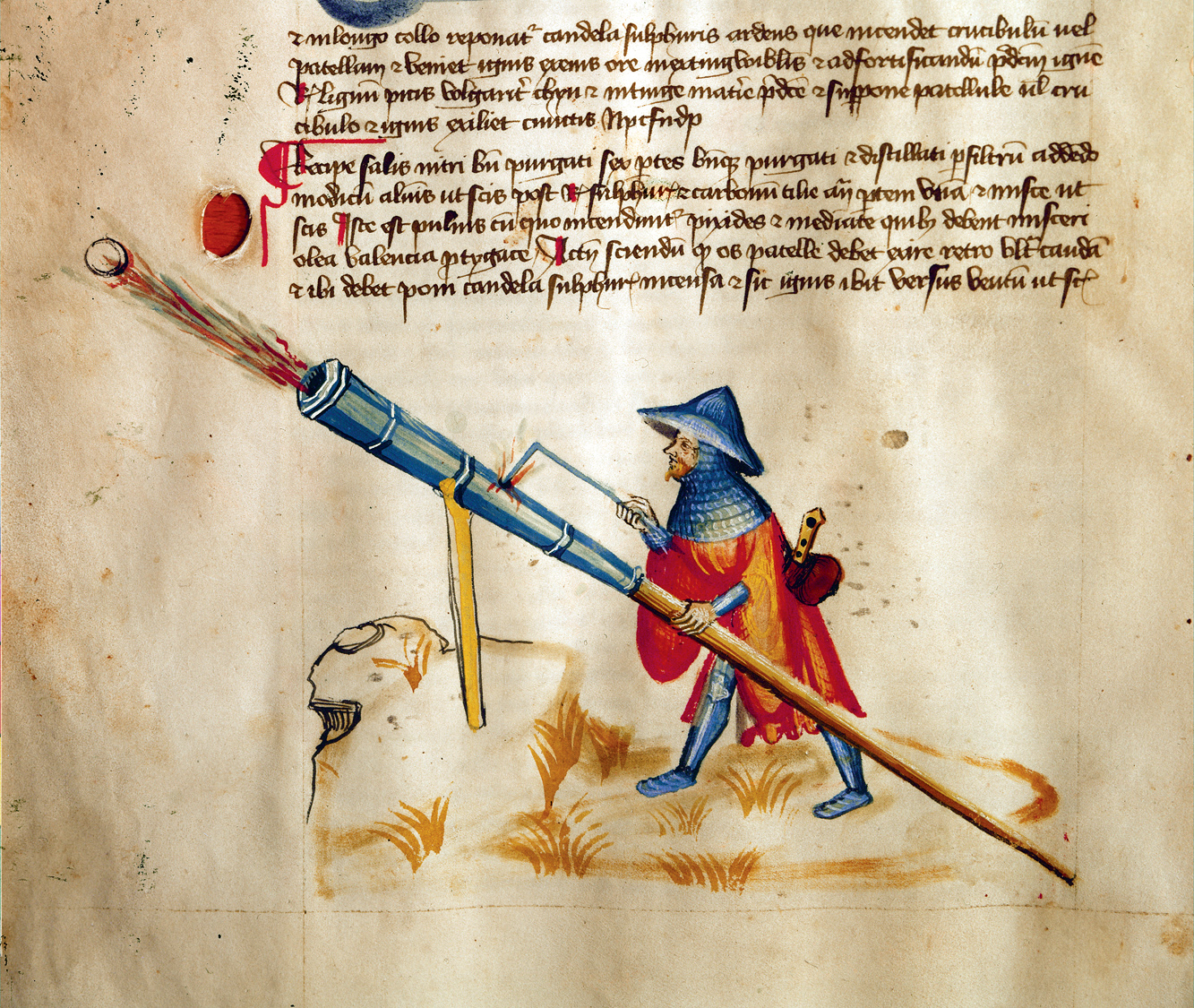
Hand cannon being fired from a stand, Bellifortis manuscript, by Konrad Kyeser, 1405

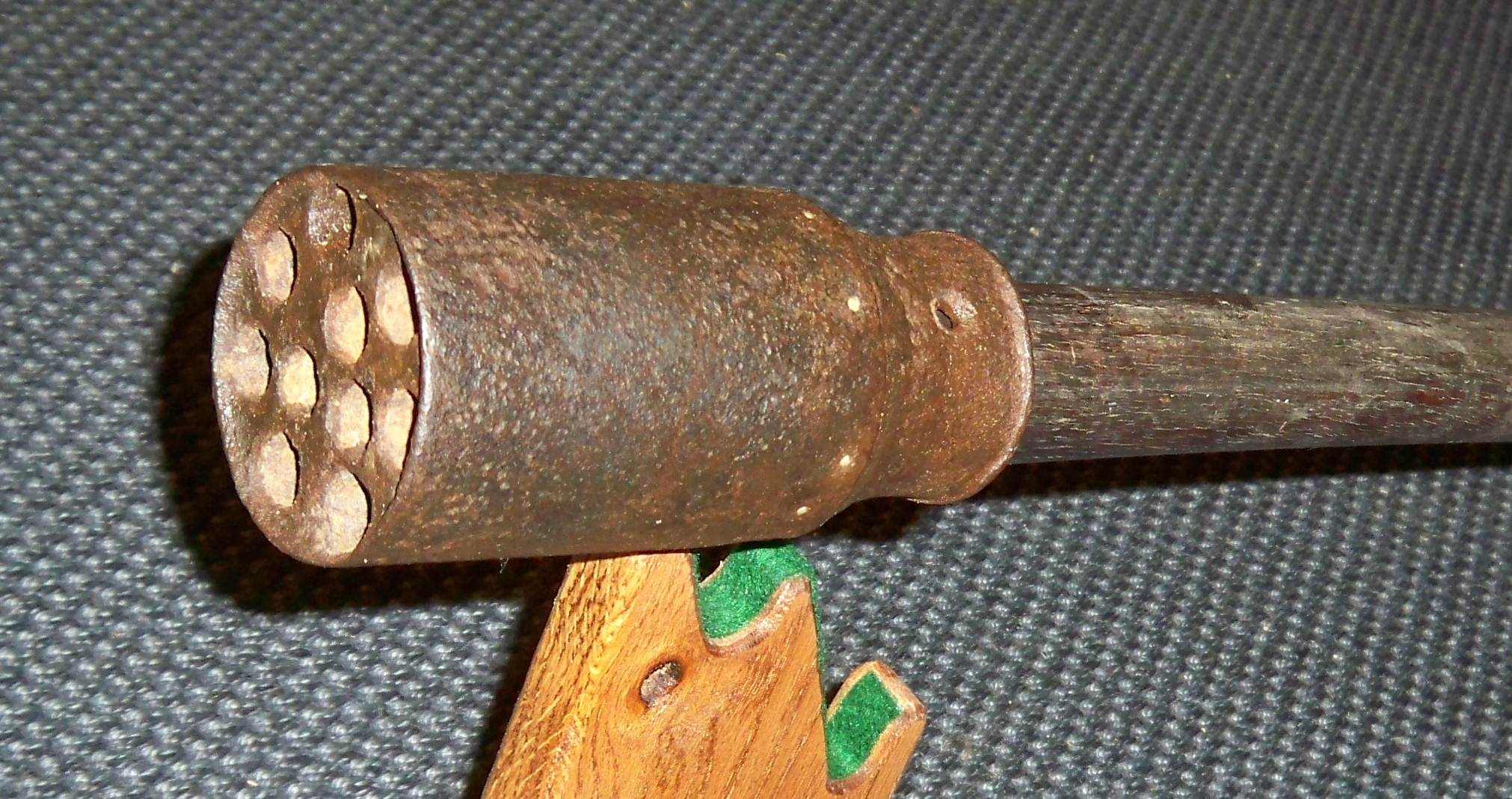
A 10-shot hand cannon (handgonne), unknown age and origin

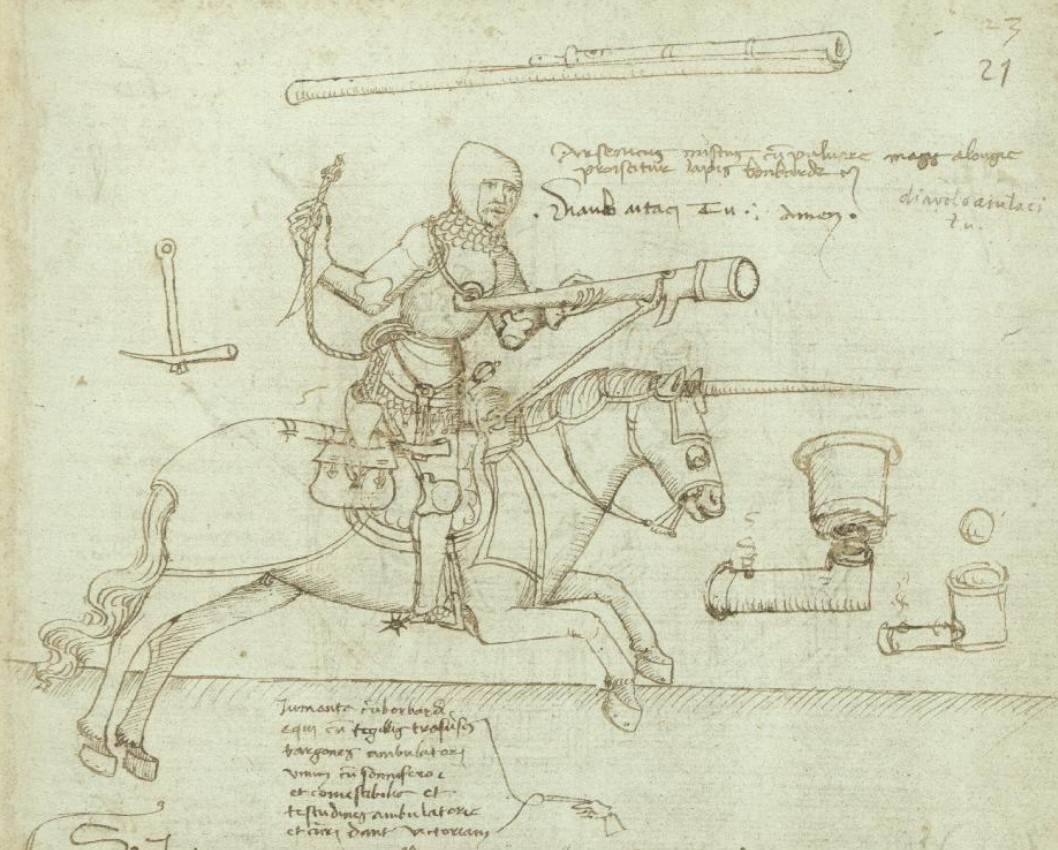
Drawing of an experimental cavalry handgonne, Taccola (1433)

== See also ==
- Musket
- Flintlock
- Pistol
- Hand mortar
- Volley gun
