= Chastity belt =

Device to prevent sexual activity

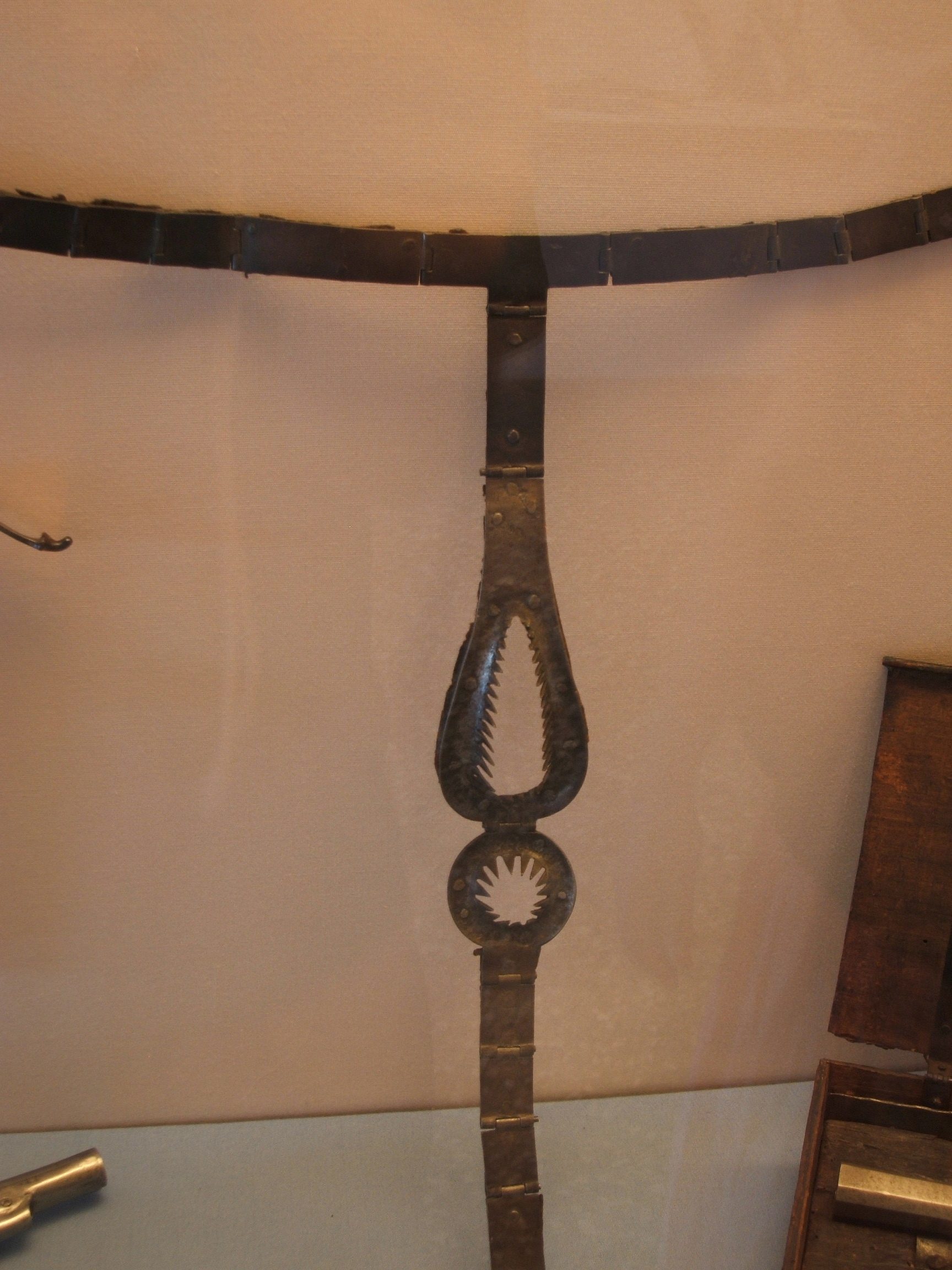
A 16th–17th alleged chastity belt on display in the Doge's Palace, Venice.

A chastity belt is a locking item of clothing designed to prevent sexual intercourse or masturbation. Such belts were historically designed for women, ostensibly for the purpose of chastity, as an anti-rape device, or to dissuade women and their potential sexual partners from sexual temptation. Modern versions of the chastity belt are predominantly, but not exclusively, used in the BDSM community, and chastity belts are now designed for male wearers in addition to female wearers.

According to modern myths, the chastity belt was used as an anti-temptation device during the Crusades. When the knight left for the Holy Lands on the Crusades, his Lady would wear a chastity belt to preserve her faithfulness to him. However, there is no credible evidence that chastity belts existed before the 15th century (over a century after the last Middle Eastern Crusade), and their main period of apparent use falls within the Renaissance rather than the Middle Ages. Research into the history of the chastity belt suggests that they were not used until the 16th century, and then only rather rarely; they first became widely available in the form of 19th-century anti-masturbation medical devices.

Renaissance chastity belts were said to have had padded linings (to prevent large areas of metal from coming into direct prolonged contact with the skin), and these had to be changed fairly frequently, so that such belts were not practical for uninterrupted long-term wear. Uninterrupted long-term wear could have caused genitourinary infection, abrasive wounds, sepsis, and eventual death.

== Historical usage ==
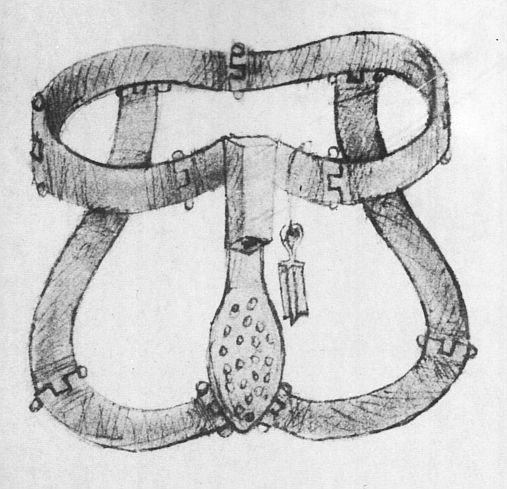
The Bellifortis sketch (c. 1405)

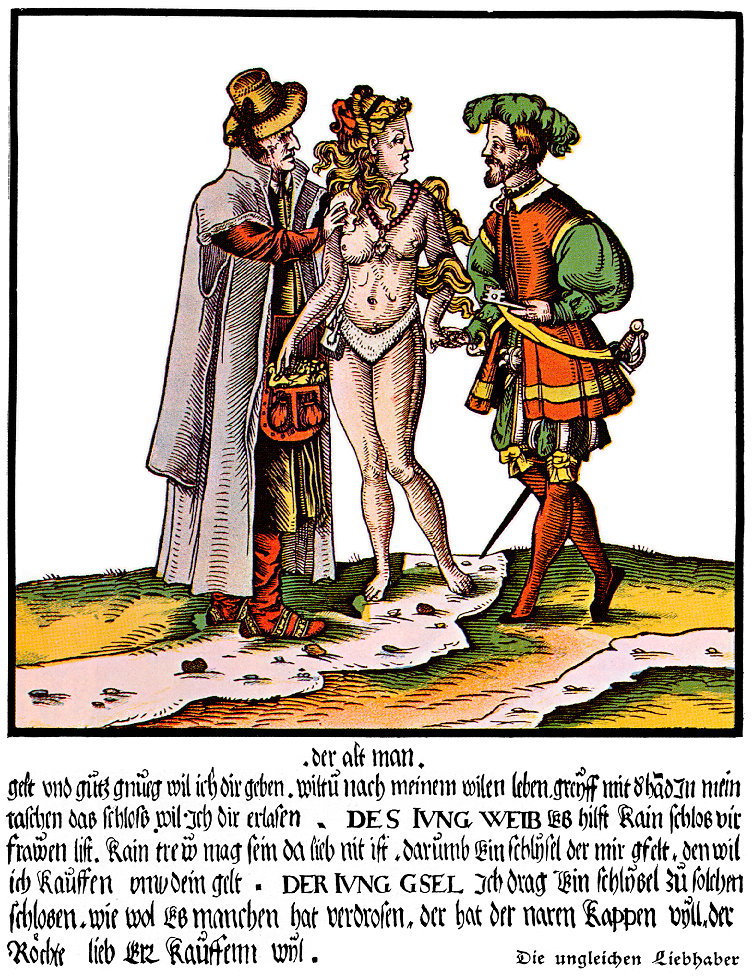
Sixteenth-century satirical German woodcut

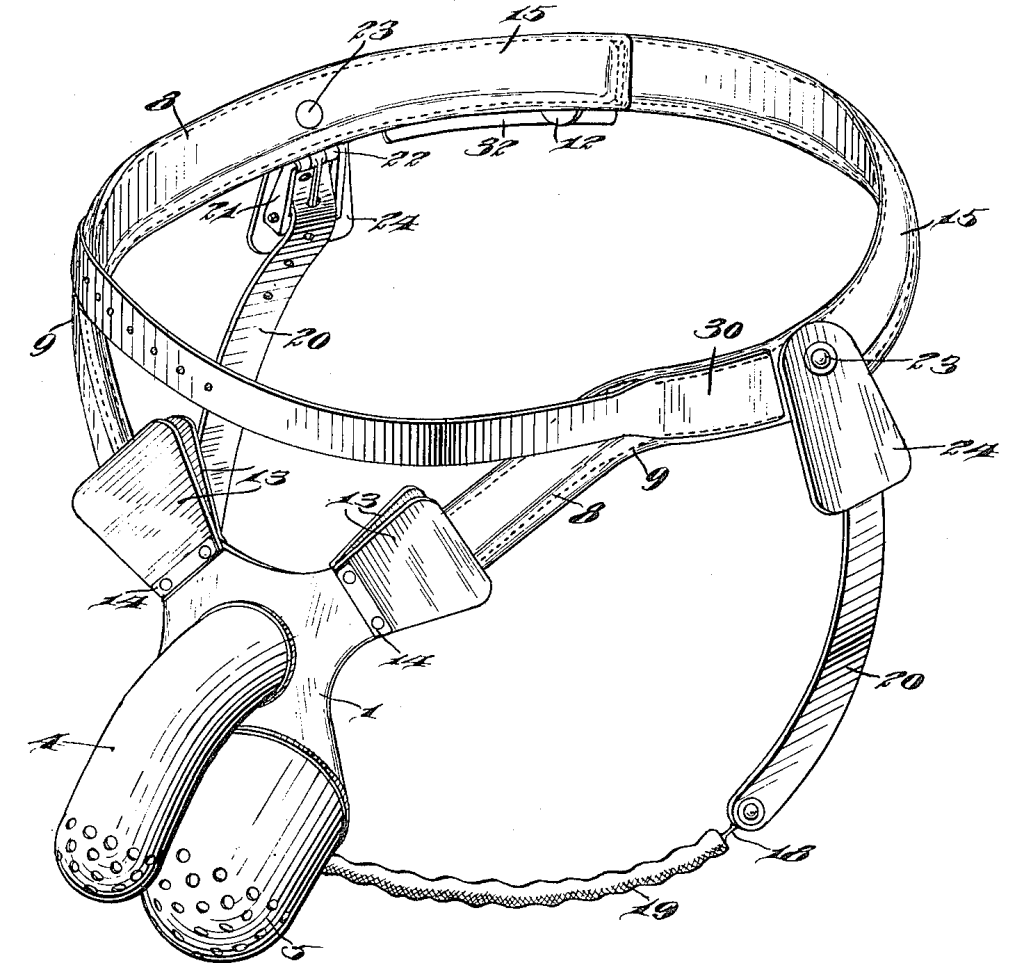
Excerpt from U.S. patent 995,600 by Jonas E. Heyser.

Gregory the Great, Alcuin of York, Bernard of Clairvaux, and Nicholas Gorranus all made passing references to "chastity belts" within their exhortatory and public discourses, but meant this in a figurative or metaphorical sense within their historical context.

The first detailed actual mention of what could be interpreted as "chastity belts" in the West is in Konrad Kyeser von Eichstätt's Bellifortis (1405), which describes the military technology of the era. The book includes a drawing that is accompanied by the Latin text: "Est florentinarum hoc bracile dominarum ferreum et durum ab antea sic reseratum." ("These are hard iron breeches of Florentine women which are closed at the front.") The belt in this drawing is described by Dingwall as "both clumsy and heavy", having "little in common with the later models which served the same use". The Bellifortis account is not supported by any additional concrete evidence or corroborating documents. Polidoro argues that Kyeser's references are meant to be humorous or ironic, and that Dingwall's accounts of the use of chastity belts by a few rich men in the 16th and 17th centuries to ensure the faithfulness of their often much younger wives should be treated critically, because of the absence of actual artifacts of this nature from the historical period in question, and his lack of access to more detailed contemporary historical records.

In 1889, a leather-and-iron belt was found by Anton Pachinger—an Austrian collector of antiquities—in Linz, Austria, in a grave on a skeleton of a young woman. The woman was reportedly buried in the 16th century. Pachinger, however, could not find any record of the woman's burial in the town archives. The belt itself, along with most of the rest of Pachinger's collection, were lost during the chaotic aftermath of World War I.

Two belts have been exhibited at the Musée de Cluny in Paris. The first, a simple velvet-covered hoop and plate of iron, was supposedly worn by Catherine de' Medici. The other—said to have been worn by Anne of Austria—is a hinged pair of plates held about the waist by metal straps, featuring intricately etched figures of Adam and Eve. There are other such belts at the Germanisches Nationalmuseum in Nuremberg and the British Museum in London. Most have been removed from public display to avoid any further embarrassment because the authenticity of these belts as medieval devices has since been called into question. Many contemporary historians accept that these alleged "artifacts" date from the 19th century, and are thus inauthentic.

From the 18th century until the 1930s, masturbation was widely regarded as harmful in Western medicine. Numerous mentions can be found in medical journals of the time of the use of chastity belt-like devices to prevent masturbation in female children and adolescents, as well as women. Many designs for anti-masturbation devices were filed in the US Patent Office until the early 1930s, when masturbation was no longer deemed to be the cause of mental health problems.

Furthermore, some 19th-century working women may have used chastity belts for protective reasons, as a "rape shield" to obstruct sexual assault from predatory bosses or male colleagues; the belts were not worn for a long time uninterruptedly, however, since sanitary and hygiene reasons prevented this before the modern invention of stainless-steel belts. The belt design was the most common but there were also concealed versions worn inside the vagina which were designed to injure the penis.

== Modern usage ==
=== BDSM ===
Chastity belts are sometimes used in BDSM play in consensual relationships. They are a means for the wearer to surrender control over their sexual behavior either for sexual play, or as a long-term method of preventing infidelity or masturbation. They range from simple leather or plastic toys commonly sold by adult stores to expensive high-security stainless steel devices made by a handful of specialist firms. The internet has significantly increased the number of people using chastity devices, with internet advertisements and amateur erotic content sites often serving as the means of discovery of chastity devices and their use. Similarly, the internet has allowed consumers to acquire devices more easily, faster, anonymously, and from a wider range of manufacturers and retailers. Simultaneously, the internet has provided a private avenue for subcultures dedicated to their usage, fostering the culture and allowing individuals with interests in chastity to connect with one another, both on the internet and in-person.

Although there exists a historical association of chastity belts with women, the male chastity devices market offers more options and diversity compared to what is available for female chastity devices. Among male chastity devices, "cock-and-ball" trap devices are the most popular, followed by typically more secure full belt (around-the-waist) style devices.

== In popular culture ==
- In Robin Hood: Men in Tights (1993), Maid Marian (portrayed by Amy Yasbeck) has a silver-colored Everlast chastity belt first shown when she stands up from the bathtub and later revealed by the Sheriff.
- "Stoke Me a Clipper", the second episode of the seventh series of Red Dwarf (first broadcast 24 January 1997), has Dave Lister (portrayed by Craig Charles) utilize cheat codes to remove the chastity belt of the Queen of Camelot in a medieval fantasy game.
- Meet the Spartans (2008) features a scene where Margo (portrayed by Carmen Electra) comes in a golden chastity belt concealed by her dress when she encounters Leonidas for the first time.
- The Love Guru (2008): Maurice Pitka (portrayed by Mike Myers) is given a metallic chastity belt at 12 years old with a large metallic elephant head that makes a trumpeting noise when exposed. It clanks and makes a pinging noise when he gets an erection and does not protect his genitalia from pain.
- Mad Max: Fury Road (2015): The Five Wives are seen removing their chastity belts, once they have escaped from Immortan Joe and the Citadel.
- In the 2017 Korean film The Cage by Lior Shamriz, the protagonist Nick (Kim Wonmok) flees his boss (Won Tae-hee) and crosses the border wearing a pink chastity device.

== See also ==
- Confraternity of the Cord of Saint Thomas
- Erotic sexual denial
- Modesty
- Sexual abstinence
