= Hand mortar =

Hand Mortar
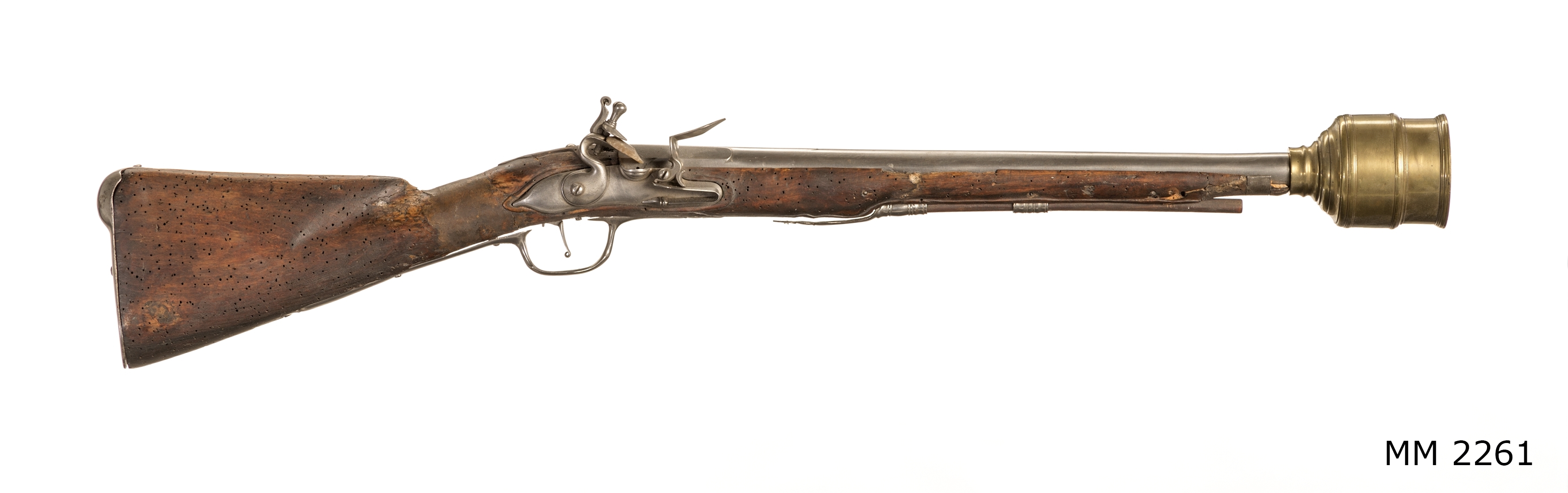
- Type: Firearm

Production history
- Designer: John Tinker Menno Van Coehoorn Others

Specifications
- Shell: Incendiary, Explosive
- Action: flintlock, matchlock, or wheellock

The hand mortar is a firearm and early predecessor of modern grenade launchers that was used in the late 17th century and 18th century to throw fused grenades. The action was similar to a flintlock, matchlock, or wheellock firearm (depending on the date of production), but the barrel was short, usually 2 inches (5.1 cm) to 4 inches (10 cm) long (though some are reported to have barrels up to 13 inches (33 cm) long), and had a large bore to accommodate the grenade; usually between 2 and 2.5 inches (5.1 and 6.4 centimetres).

== Usage ==
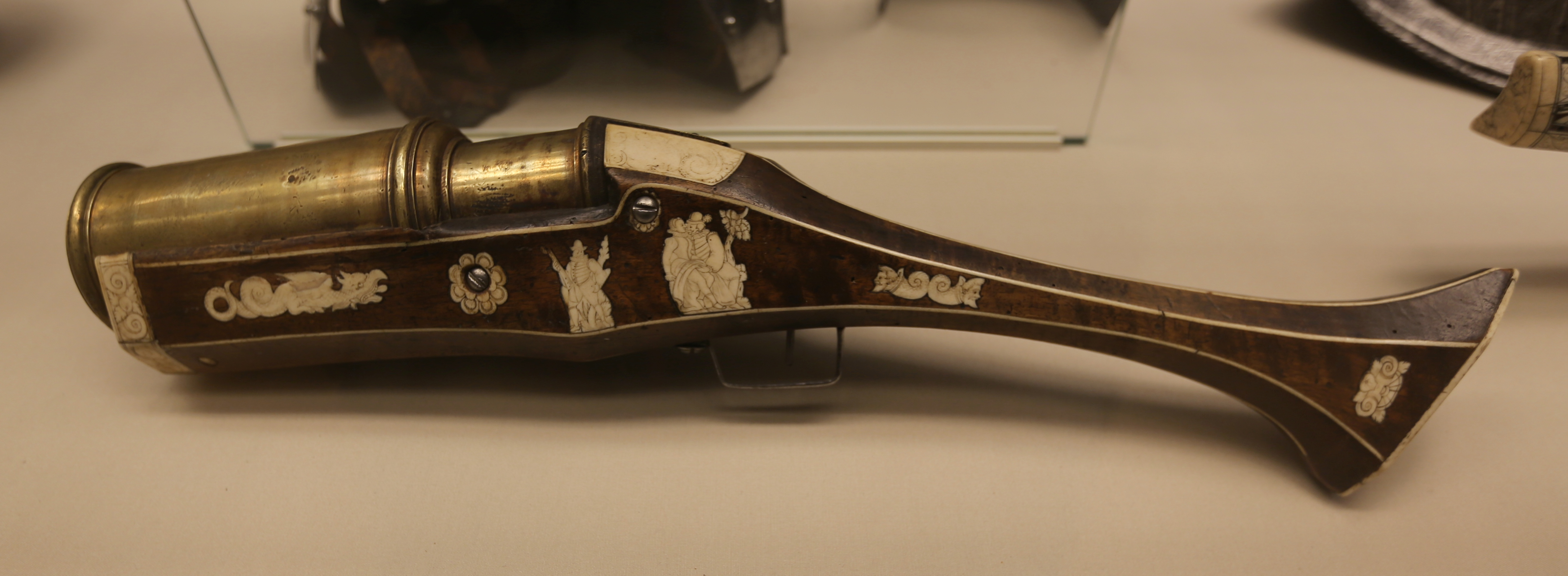
An example from the 1590s

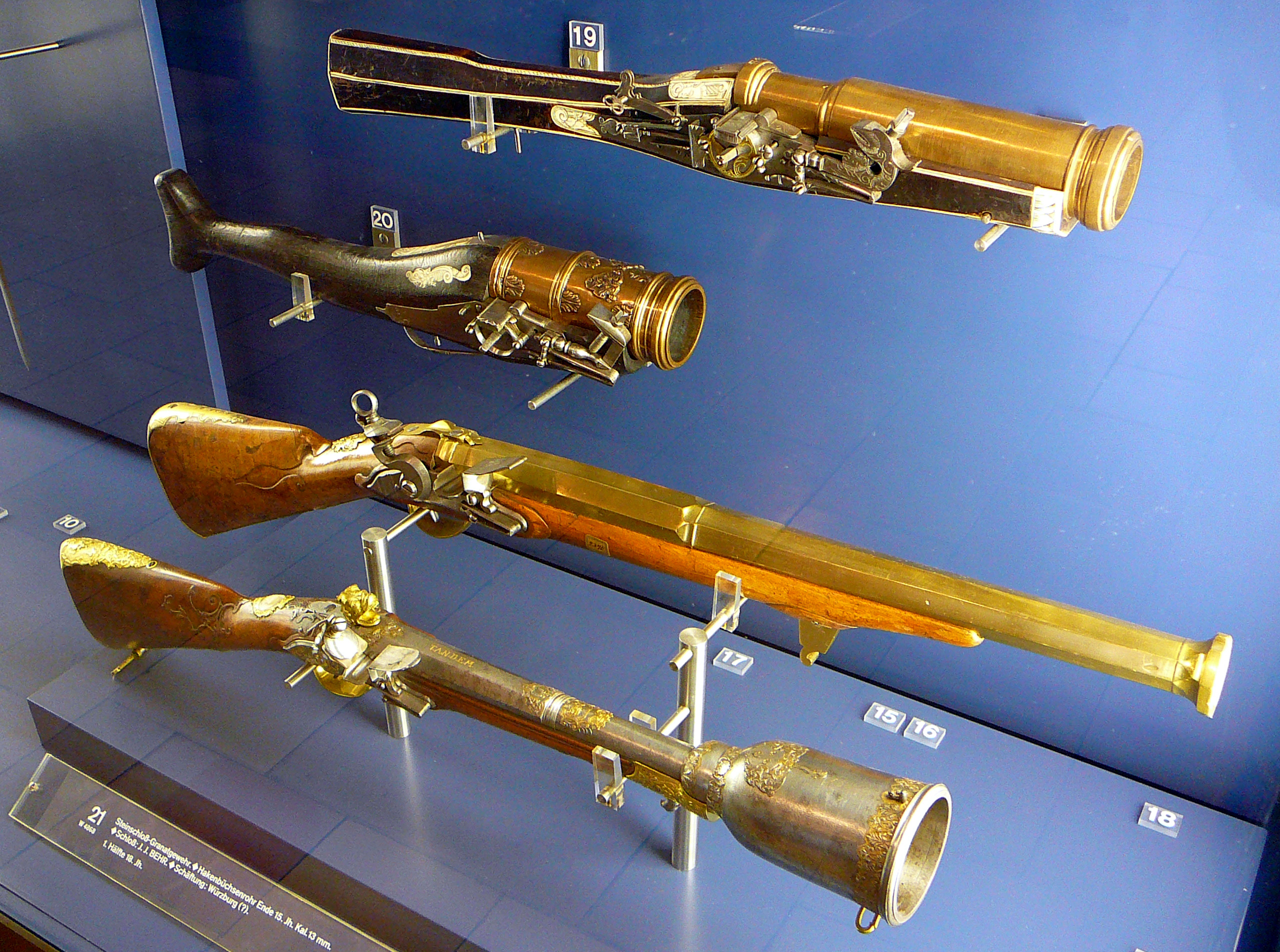
Some German hand mortars from the 16th to 18th centuries

After priming the firearm and adding the gunpowder, the shooter would light a grenade fuse, place the grenade in the muzzle of the mortar, then fire it at the enemy. However, accidents could occur if the weapon misfired and the lit grenade remained in the barrel. Additional modifications attempted to light the grenade using the burning gunpowder, but accounts say that the fuse would be forced into the grenade, detonating it prematurely.

The low number of surviving specimens of this firearm indicate that it was not a popular weapon, possibly due to the safety issues. In his essay on the weapon, Hewitt opines that the mortar is among a variety of "projects for destruction which have never destroyed anything but the fortunes of their inventors." In fact, under military exhibitions in The Official Report of the Calcutta International Exhibition, 1883–84 a hand mortar is described as "only a toy ... never intended for service."

Hand mortars were also to be found in the New World. References to a hand mortar being transferred in Maryland are found in the record of The Proceedings of the Council of Maryland in 1698.

== Naval usage ==
In 1872, a work titled Life-boats, Projectiles and Other Means for Saving Life gave an account of a sailor using a hand mortar. The hand mortar was described as being able to throw a leaden projectile and a line a distance of 80 yards (73 metres). It, however, doesn't seem to have any direct connection to the military hand mortars of the 17th century, rather being a hand variety of the Manby mortars which were used during the 19th century for throwing lines.

== Inventors ==
At least one version of the hand mortar was probably invented by John Tinker in 1681. However, his mortar may have been an improvement on an earlier piece. A reference to this mortar may have appeared in a work titled Ancient Armour which refers to a tinker's mortar. Another account refers to a hand mortar as a coehorn, and attributes its invention to a Dutch engineer, Menno Van Coehoorn, who lived from 1641 to 1704.

== Production ==
Between 1672 and 1740, the Royal Foundry of Berlin (Königliches Gießhaus zu Berlin) produced 302 hand mortars (Handmörser). Additionally, a mortar at the Museum of Artillery in Woolwich, Great Britain bears the inscription Fondeur á Strasbourg (made in Strasbourg (France)) and several other surviving pieces bear the coat of arms of Württemberg indicating that they might have been made there.

== Ammunition ==
The first references to the type of grenade used in a hand mortar occur in a 1472 work titled Valturius, where an incendiary prototype may have been produced. However, widespread use of the explosive grenade does not occur until the early-to-mid-16th century under Francis I of France. An early casualty of this type of grenade was Count de Randan who died of shrapnel wounds to the legs from a grenade during the Siege of Rouen (probably the battle of Issoire) in 1562. Explosive grenades were made from brass, glass, and possibly clay, and incendiary projectiles were made from canvas, however, Nathanael Nye, Master Gunner of the City of Worcester in a work titled Art of Gunnery published in 1647, remarks that the soldiers of his day were not fond of handling the grenades because they were too dangerous. While there are substantial records of infantry units called grenadiers throughout the 18th century in Europe, these units generally threw the grenades by hand.

== See also ==
- Grenade launcher
- Type 89 grenade discharger
- Hand cannon
- Cohorn
- Fire lance
