= Ōdzutsu =

Type of Japanese hand cannon

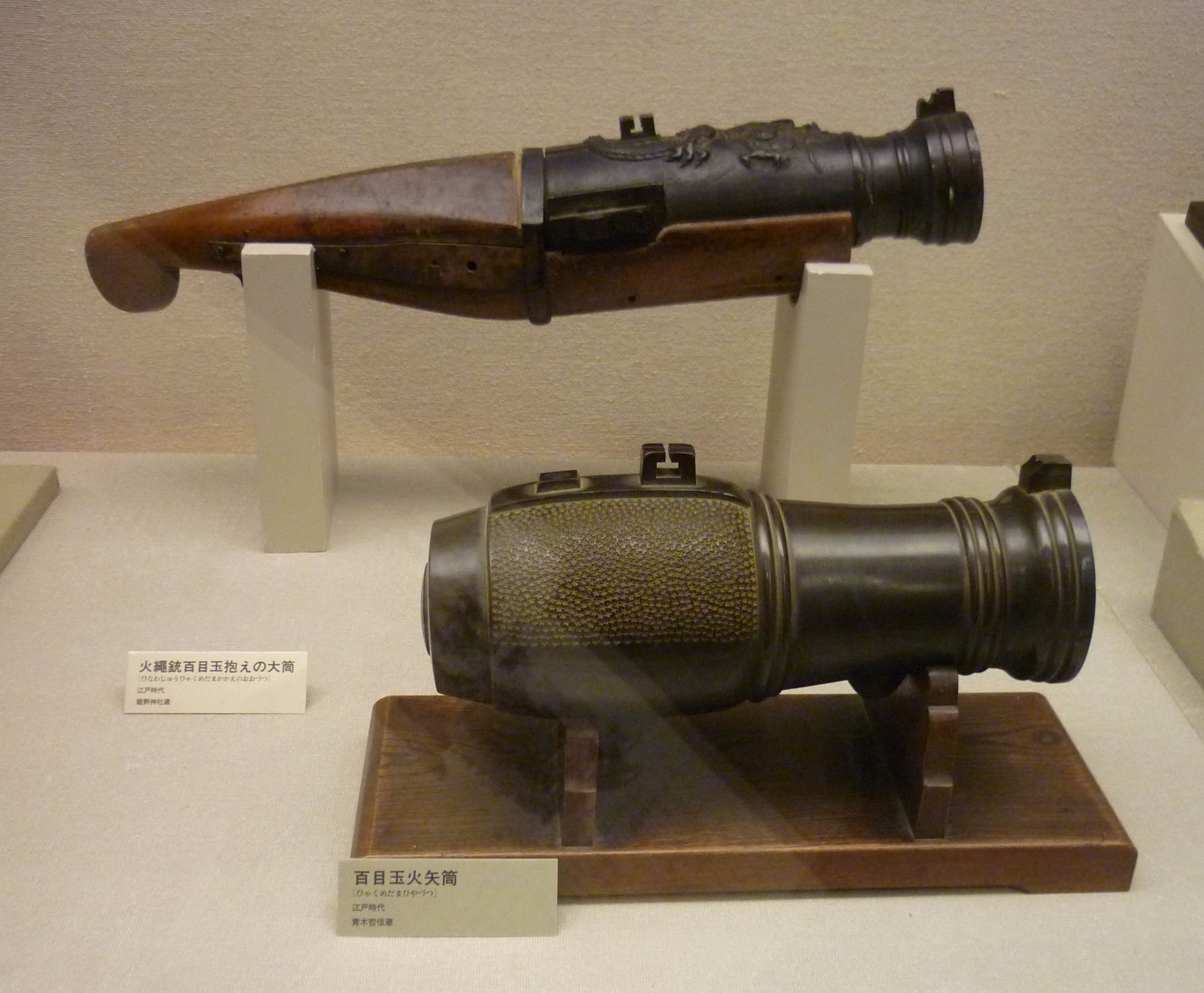
An ōdzutsu (top) from the Edo period

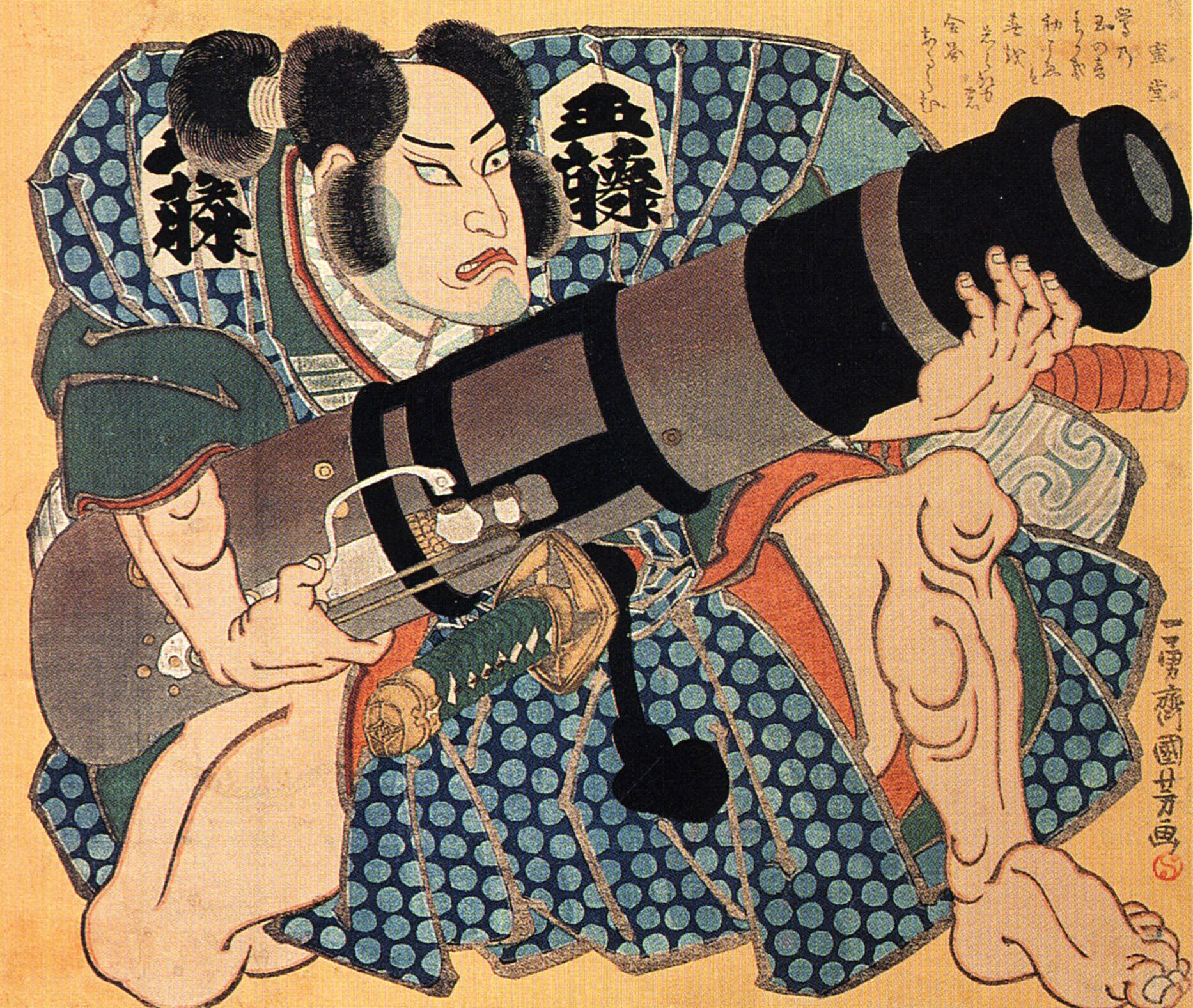
Man with an ōdzutsu (Ukiyo-e painting by Utagawa Kuniyoshi)

An ōdzutsu (大筒, 'big cylinder') was a type of Japanese hand cannon used during the Sengoku and early Edo periods.

== Description ==
The ōdzutsu was used primarily in naval and siege battles during the Sengoku period for its efficiency in destroying large enemy structures. Though interpretations of ōdzutsu differ in literature, it is generally regarded as a weapon of forged iron to distinguish it from an ishibiya (a cast bronze hand cannon). Its bullets were about 20 maces (75 g (2.6 oz)). It is fixed to a ring or a wooden frame with only the barrel and fired using a difference fire. Some have an ignition system and a stock that uses a matchlock.

It was considerably more powerful than its cast bronze counterpart, and because it was forged, the risk of the barrel exploding was smaller than that of a cast gun. It could be relatively easily manufactured due to its inexpensive materials, but cannot be produced with too large a diameter due to limited forging techniques at the time. There is a famous large ōdzutsu, known as the Shibatsuji Gun, located in the Yūshūkan of Yasukuni Shrine, Tokyo.

=== Other remarks ===
- The range of a 50-mace (187 g (6.6 oz)) ōdzutsu manufactured by the Kunitomo gunsmiths can reach up to 1.6 km (0.99 mi).
- The Izu suigun of the Sengoku Jidai used ōdzutsu extensively in naval battles.
