= Konrad Kyeser =

14th-century German military engineer

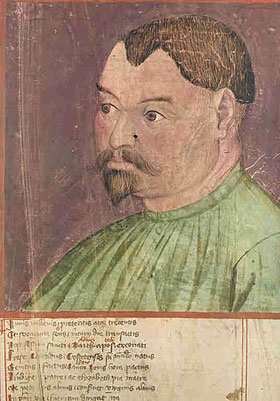
Konrad Kyeser, illustration on his Bellifortis manuscript (Cod. Ms. philos. 63)

Konrad Kyeser (26 August 1366 – after 1405) was a German military engineer and the author of Bellifortis (c. 1405), a book on military technology that was popular throughout the 15th century. Originally conceived for King Wenceslaus, Kyeser dedicated the finished work to Rupert of Germany.

A native of Eichstätt, Kyeser was trained as a physician and lived at the court in Padua before he joined the crusade against the Turks which ended in disaster at the Battle of Nicopolis in 1396. Kyeser lived in exile in a mountain village in Bohemia during the reign of Sigismund in 1402 to 1403.

== Bellifortis ==
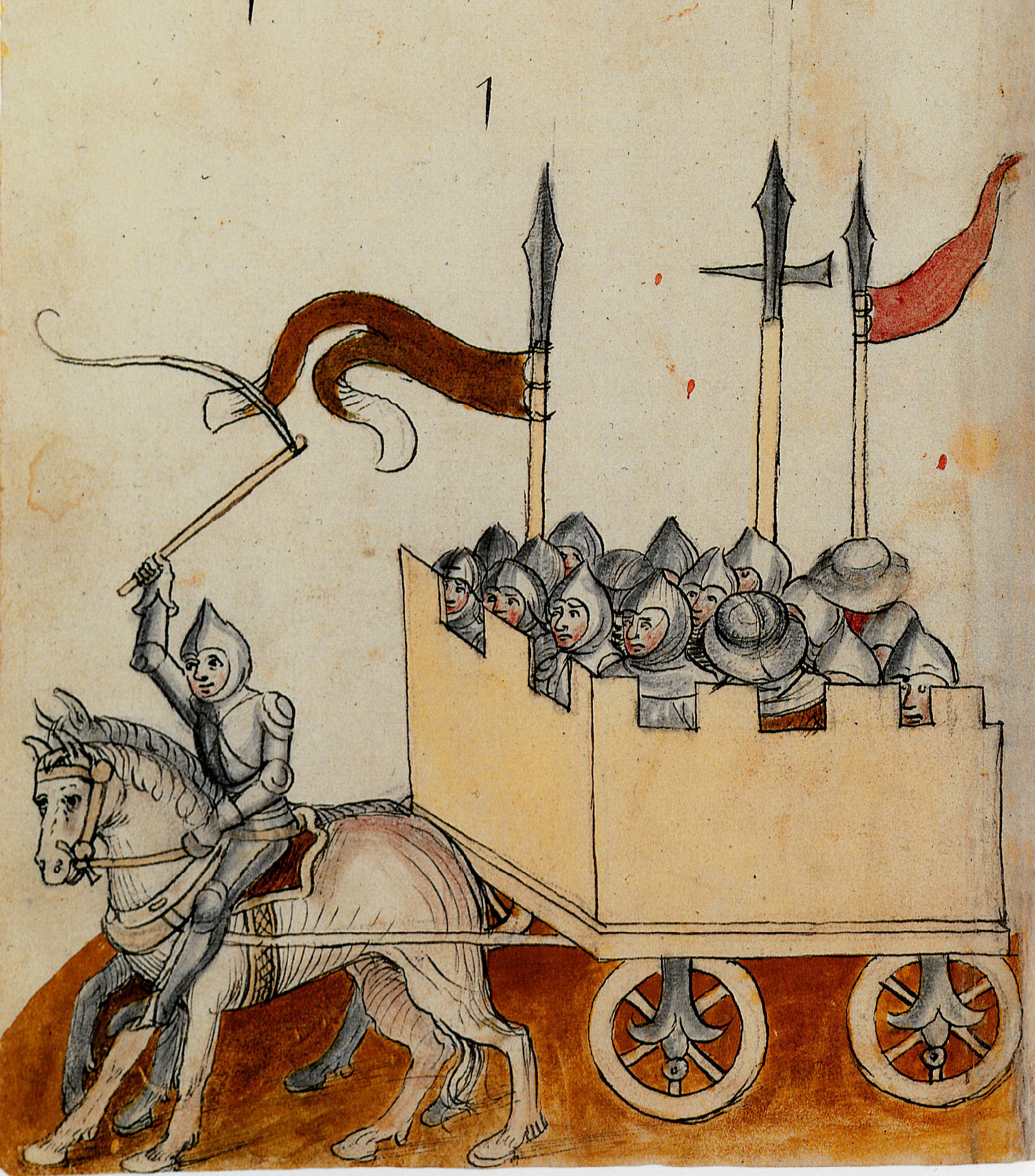
War wagon (Clm 30150 manuscript)

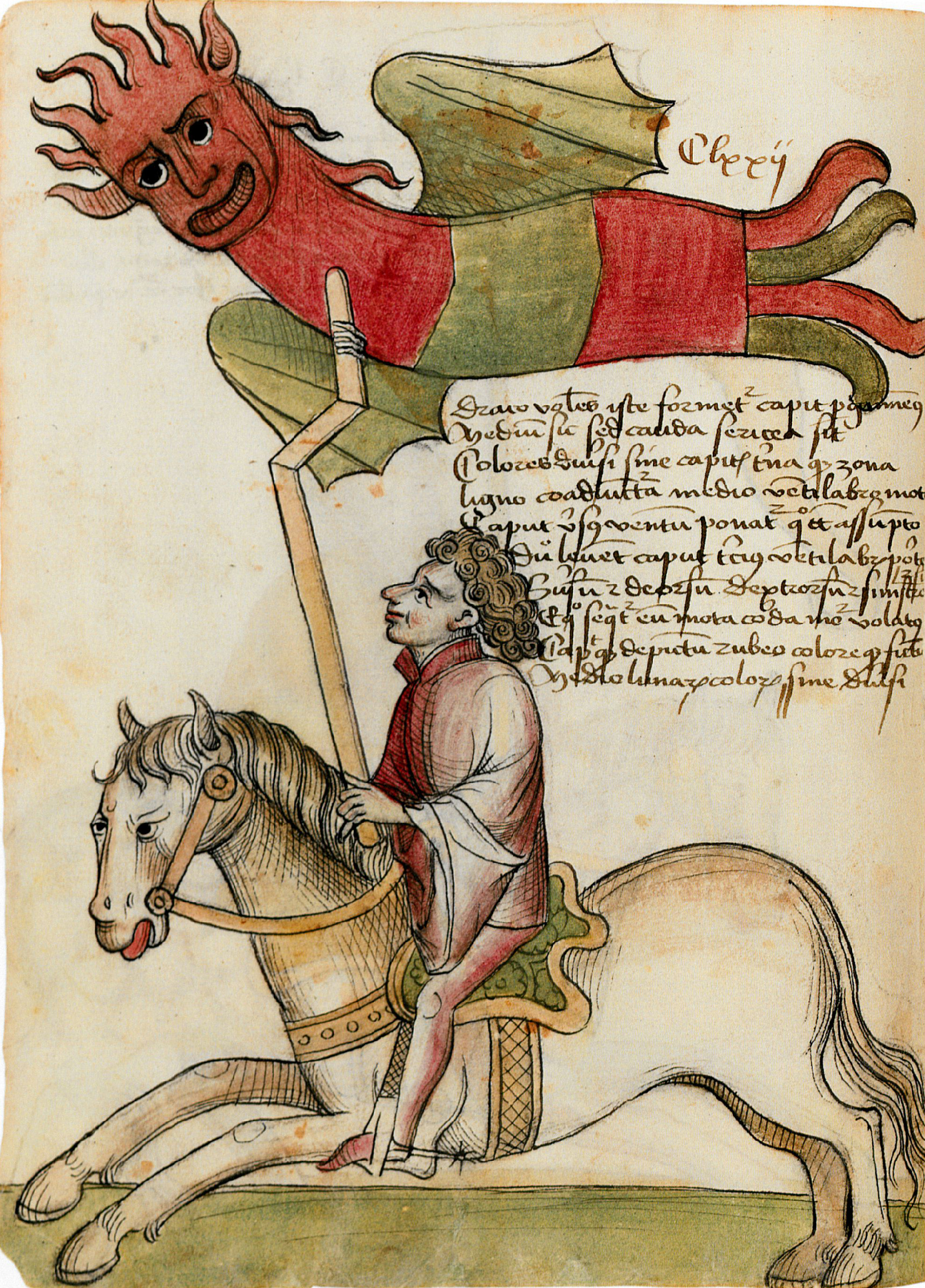
Rider with kite (Clm 30150 manuscript)

During his time in exile, Kyeser began to write his book on the military arts. The book is the most prominent illustrated treatise on military engineering of the Late Middle Ages. There are at least twelve surviving 15th-century manuscripts which copy, excerpt, or amplify the work. One of these is the Thott Fechtbuch of Hans Talhoffer (1459).

The book is divided into ten chapters, though there are also issues with the full content divided into 7 chapters. The topics of the chapters include cars, siege engines, hydraulic engines, elevators, firearms, defensive arms, "wondrous secrets", fireworks for warfare, fireworks for pleasure, and auxiliary tools.

The diving suit presented in the book has precedents reaching back to the 12th century and to Roger Bacon. The book also has the earliest known depiction of a chastity belt. Kyeser counts the artes magicae among the mechanical arts, and his work contains various applications of magic in warfare.

=== Editions ===
The original codex is kept in the Göttingen University library (Cod. Ms. philos. 63). Other editions include the following:

- Götz Quarg (ed.), facsimile of the Göttinger MS Philos. 63, VDI-Verlag, Düsseldorf (1967)
- Udo Friedrich (introduction), Fidel Rädle (trans.), Bellifortis, Codices figurati - libri picturati, Lengenfelder, Munich (1995), ISBN 3-89219-303-7. (facsimile of Cod. Ms. philos. 64 und 64a Cim.)
- electronic edition (CD ROM), facsimile of Cod. Pal. lat. 1994, Palatina manuscripts of the 12th-15th centuries, Belser, Wildberg (2001)

== In popular culture ==
Kyeser appears as an NPC in the 2018 video game Kingdom Come: Deliverance, and is voiced by Brian Blessed.

== See also ==
- De rebus bellicis

== Literature ==
- L. White, Kyeser's "Bellifortis": The First Technological Treatise of the Fifteenth Century, Technology and Culture (1969).
- Brian R. Price, Bellifortis: Conrad Kyeser and his war-book in THEME: The Knights Templar vol. 6, 2006, pp. 48–51.
