= Coslett =

Surname

Coslett is an uncommon surname with origins in 16th-century Wales. The main spelling variants are Cosslett and Coslet, though Corslet, Coslette and other spellings have been recorded.

== Origin of the surname ==
The Oxford English Dictionary (OED) gives the following first definition of corslet / corselet: "A piece of defensive armour covering the body." Secondary definitions include "a soldier armed with a corselet", "a garment (usually tight-fitting) covering the body as distinct from the limbs" and, used in combination, as a "corslet-maker" or "corslet-man", the latter meaning "a soldier armed with a corslet." The word is of French origins, and its etymology is given by the OED as "double dim. of cors, or body."

Not surprisingly given its etymology, the apparent first Corslet, and many of the Cosletts, Cossletts and Coslets who followed, were skilled iron workers. This first 'Corslet' came to Wales to work with iron. The Company of Mineral and Battery Works (hereafter "the Company") was one of two mining monopolies created by Queen Elizabeth I in the mid-1560s, the other being the Society of Mines Royal. The company's rights were based on a patent awarded to William Humfrey on 17 September 1565. On 28 May 1568, this patent was replaced by a "patent of incorporation," making the company an early joint stock company. The patent of incorporation provided the company with monopoly rights to manufacture various products including, in particular, iron wire.

Iron wire had many uses, perhaps none more important than the making of wool cards which were essential to Britain's important wool industry. However, at this time, the methods for producing iron wire in England were traditional ones, inferior to methods that had long been in use on the European Continent. The main technical barrier was a lack of knowledge about how to produce 'Osmond iron,' a high-quality iron essential to producing fine, relatively thin and malleable iron wire.

Humfrey was intent on introducing these 'modern' techniques. Beginning in November 1566, in Tintern, a village along the River Wye in Monmouthshire, he oversaw the construction of England's first wireworks operated by water power. What was now needed was a steady supply of high-quality iron from which the wire could be manufactured. In 1567, Humfrey succeeded in obtaining the services of an expert in the production of Osmond iron from the south-western part of Westphalia, in northern Germany. This expert arrived in Wales in 1567 and began working at a forge located in Rhyd-y-Gwern, a hamlet in the Glamorganshire part of the parish of Machen, about 20 miles southwest of the Tintern wireworks. The expert's name was later provided in Humfrey's letter of 24 August 1577:

'one Corslett, a German born who at his coming over into this realm first devised more commodius engines than ever before was known or used in England...engines, tools and devices as were first used and invented by the said Corslet, for the making and hoosing of Osmond iron...'

According to historian H. R. Schubert, the full name of this expert was Corslett Tinkhaus of Westphalia, Germany.

== Distribution of the name ==
Wales (especially Glamorgan), England, United States, Canada, New Zealand, South Africa, Australia.

== People ==
Prominent or famous people having Coslett as a surname include:

- Carol Coslett (born 1963), British Anglican priest
- Dennis Coslett (1939–2004), Welsh political activist
- Franklin Coslett (1921–2011), American politician from Pennsylvania
- Kel Coslett (born 1942), Welsh rugby player
- Norman Coslett (1909–1987), Royal Air Force officer

== See also ==
- Bruce Coslet (born 1946), American football player
- Coslett Herbert Waddell (1858–1919), Irish priest and botanist
- Cosslett (surname)

== Coslett networking and genealogy links ==
- Coslett Family Genealogy Forum
- The Coslett Zone Genealogy and Networking
