= Renaissance technology =

Technology during the Renaissance era

Renaissance technology was the set of European artifacts and inventions which spread through the Renaissance period, roughly the 14th century through the 16th century. The era is marked by profound technical advancements such as the printing press, linear perspective in drawing, patent law, double shell domes and bastion fortresses. Sketchbooks from artisans of the period (Taccola and Leonardo da Vinci, for example) give a deep insight into the mechanical technology then known and applied.

Renaissance science spawned the Scientific Revolution; science and technology began a cycle of mutual advancement.

== Renaissance technology ==
Some important Renaissance technologies, including both innovations and improvements on existing techniques:

- mining and metallurgy
- blast furnace enabled iron to be produced in significant quantities
- finery forge enabled pig iron (from the blast furnace) into bar iron (wrought iron)
- slitting mill mechanized the production of iron rods for nailmaking
- smeltmill increased the output of lead over previous methods (bole hill)

=== Late 14th century ===
Some of the technologies were the arquebus and the musket.

=== 15th century ===
The technologies that developed in Europe during the second half of the 15th century were commonly associated by authorities of the time with a key theme in Renaissance thought: the rivalry of the Moderns and the Ancients. Three inventions in particular — the printing press, firearms, and the nautical compass — were indeed seen as evidence that the Moderns could not only compete with the Ancients, but had surpassed them, for these three inventions allowed modern people to communicate, exercise power, and travel at distances unimaginable in earlier times.

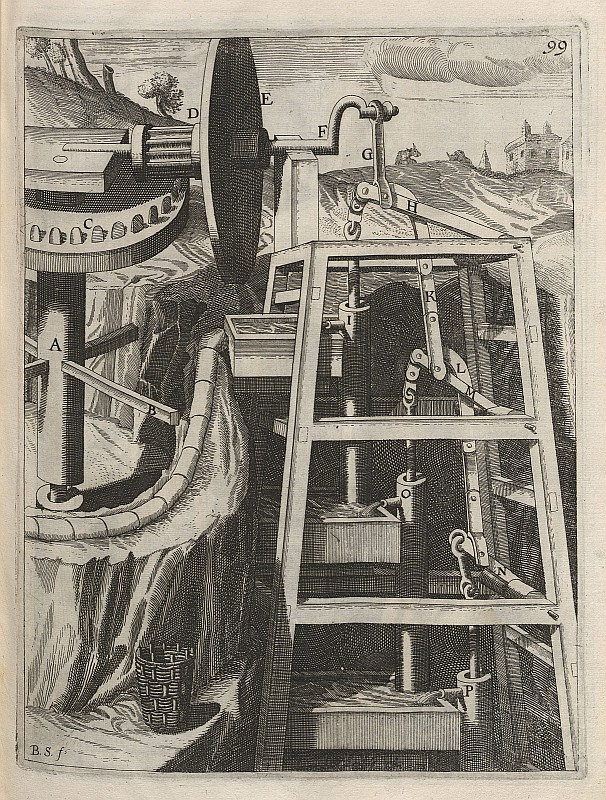
Water-raising pump powered by crank and connecting rod mechanism (Georg Andreas Böckler, 1661)

Crank and connecting rod

The crank and connecting rod mechanism which converts circular into reciprocal motion is of utmost importance for the mechanization of work processes; it is first attested for Roman water-powered sawmills. During the Renaissance, its use is greatly diversified and mechanically refined; now connecting-rods are also applied to double compound cranks, while the flywheel is employed to get these cranks over the 'dead-spot'. Early evidence of such machines appears, among other things, in the works of the 15th-century engineers Anonymous of the Hussite Wars and Taccola. From then on, cranks and connecting rods become an integral part of machine design and are applied in ever more elaborate ways: Agostino Ramelli's The Diverse and Artifactitious Machines of 1588 depicts eighteen different applications, a number which rises in the 17th-century Theatrum Machinarum Novum by Georg Andreas Böckler to forty-five.

Printing press

Two printers operating a Gutenberg-style printing press (1568). Such presses could make around 3,600 impressions per workday.

The introduction of the mechanical movable type printing press by the German goldsmith Johannes Gutenberg (1398–1468) is widely regarded as the single most important event of the second millennium, and is one of the defining moments of the Renaissance. The Printing Revolution which it sparks throughout Europe works as a modern "agent of change" in the transformation of medieval society.

The mechanical device consists of a screw press modified for printing purposes which can produce 3,600 pages per workday, allowing the mass production of printed books on a proto-industrial scale. By the start of the 16th century, printing presses are operating in over 200 cities in a dozen European countries, producing more than twenty million volumes. By 1600, their output had risen tenfold to an estimated 150 to 200 million copies, while Gutenberg book printing spread from Europe further afield.

The relatively free flow of information transcends borders and induced a sharp rise in Renaissance literacy, learning and education; the circulation of (revolutionary) ideas among the rising middle classes, but also the peasants, threatens the traditional power monopoly of the ruling nobility and is a key factor in the rapid spread of the Protestant Reformation. The dawn of the Gutenberg Galaxy, the era of mass communication, is instrumental in fostering the gradual democratization of knowledge which sees for the first time modern media phenomena such as the press or bestsellers emerging. The prized incunables, which are testimony to the aesthetic taste and high proficient competence of Renaissance book printers, are one lasting legacy of the 15th century.

Cristallo

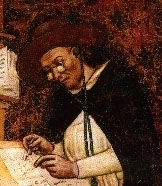
Detail of a portrait of Hugh de Provence (wearing spectacles), painted by Tommaso da Modena in 1352

While the use of glass for spectacles dates back to at least 1290, a critical Renaissance innovation occurred in the mid-15th century, when Venetian glassmakers developed the exceptionally clear colourless glass, cristallo, made from high-purity quartz pebbles (instead of sand) and using manganese oxide as a "decolorizer" to neutralize the greenish tint caused by iron impurities. This was the "specialty" glass of the Renaissance era, a luxury product used for windows, mirrors, ships' lanterns, and lenses. When the first telescope was later invented during the Scientific Revolution, the first historical record of the invention did not appear in a work of natural philosophy but rather in a patent filed by a spectacle maker.

Parachute

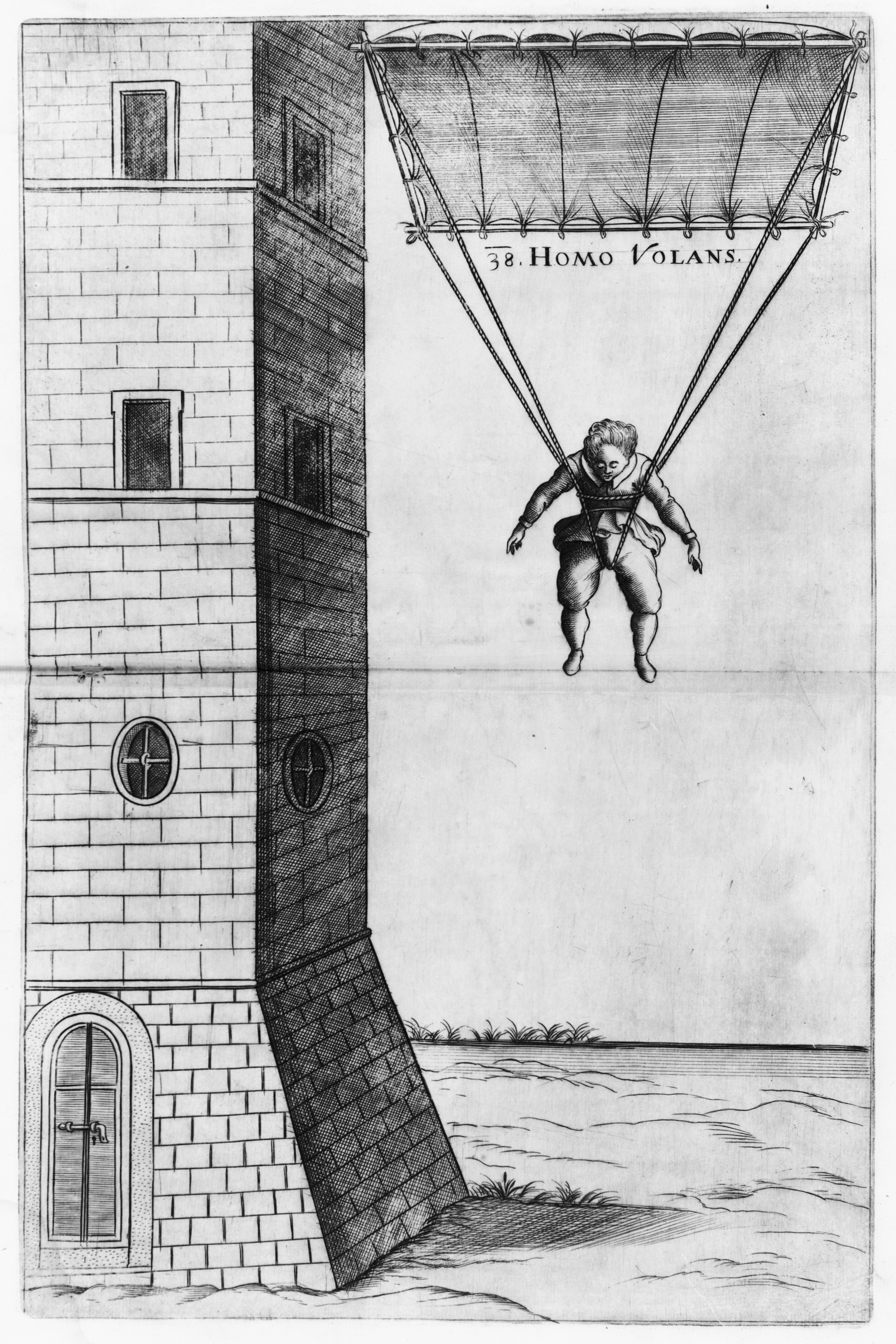
Veranzio's 1595 parachute design titled "Flying Man"

The earliest known parachute design appears in an anonymous manuscript from 1470s Renaissance Italy; it depicts a free-hanging man clutching a crossbar frame attached to a conical canopy. As a safety measure, four straps run from the ends of the rods to a waist belt. Around 1485, a more advanced parachute was sketched by the polymath Leonardo da Vinci in his Codex Atlanticus (fol. 381v), which he scales in a more favorable proportion to the weight of the jumper. Leonardo's canopy was held open by a square wooden frame, altering the shape of the parachute from conical to pyramidal. The Venetian inventor Fausto Veranzio (1551–1617) modifies da Vinci's parachute sketch by keeping the square frame, but replacing the canopy with a bulging sail-like piece of cloth. This he realized decelerates the fall more effectively. Claims that Veranzio successfully tested his parachute design in 1617 by jumping from a tower in Venice cannot be substantiated; since he was around 65 years old at the time.

Mariner's astrolabe

The earliest recorded uses of the astrolabe for navigational purposes are by the Portuguese explorers Diogo de Azambuja (1481), Bartholomew Diaz (1487/88) and Vasco da Gama (1497–98) during their sea voyages around Africa.

Dry dock

While dry docks were already known in Hellenistic shipbuilding, these facilities were reintroduced in 1495/96, when Henry VII of England ordered one to be built at the Portsmouth navy base.

=== 16th century ===
Floating dock

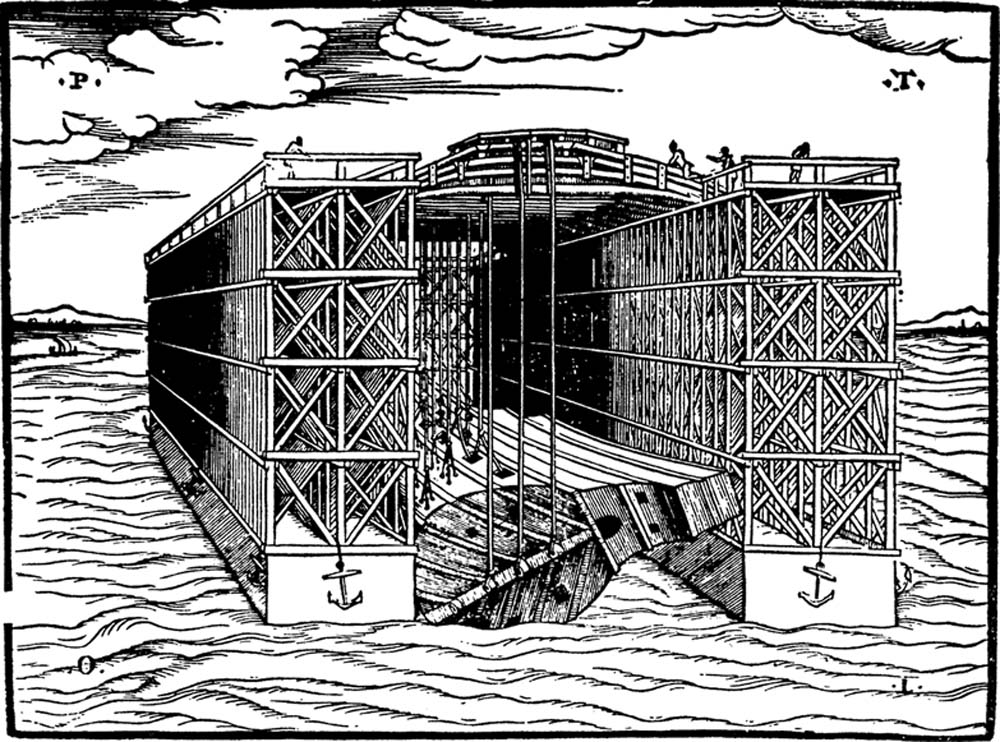
Floating dock at Venice (1560)

The earliest known description of a floating dock comes from a small Italian book printed in Venice in 1560, titled Descrittione dell'artifitiosa machina. In the booklet, an unknown author asks for the privilege of using a new method for the salvaging of a grounded ship and then proceeds to describe and illustrate his approach. The included woodcut shows a ship flanked by two large floating trestles, forming a roof above the vessel. The ship is pulled in an upright position by a number of ropes attached to the superstructure.

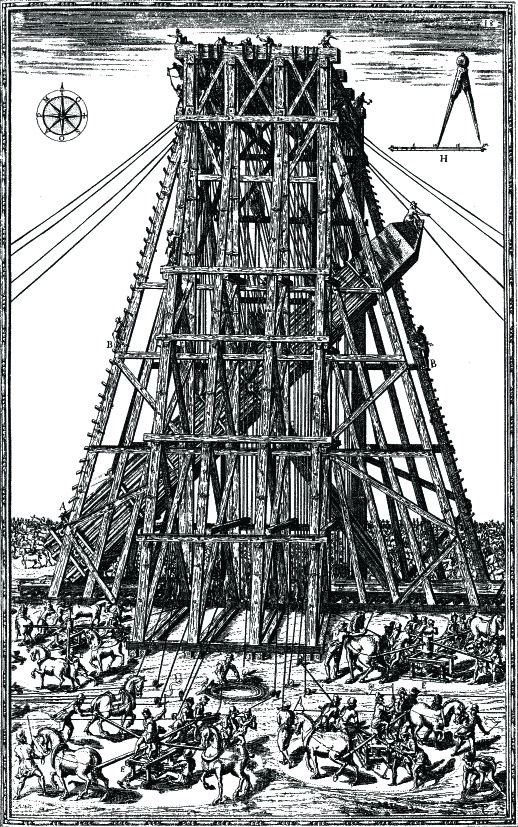
Relocation of the Vatican Obelisk, Rome, by Domenico Fontana (1586)

Lifting tower

A lifting tower was used to great effect by Domenico Fontana to relocate the monolithic Vatican obelisk in Rome. Its weight of 361 t was far greater than any of the blocks the Romans are known to have lifted by cranes. (Note: 53.3 t at Trajan's Column (Lancaster 1999, p. 426); 60−100 t at the Jupiter temple of Baalbek (Coulton 1974, p. 16).)

Mining, machinery and chemistry A standard reference for the state of mechanical arts during the Renaissance is given in the mining engineering treatise De re metallica (1556), which also contains sections on geology, mining and chemistry. De re metallica was the standard chemistry reference for the next 180 years.

=== Early 17th century ===
Newspaper

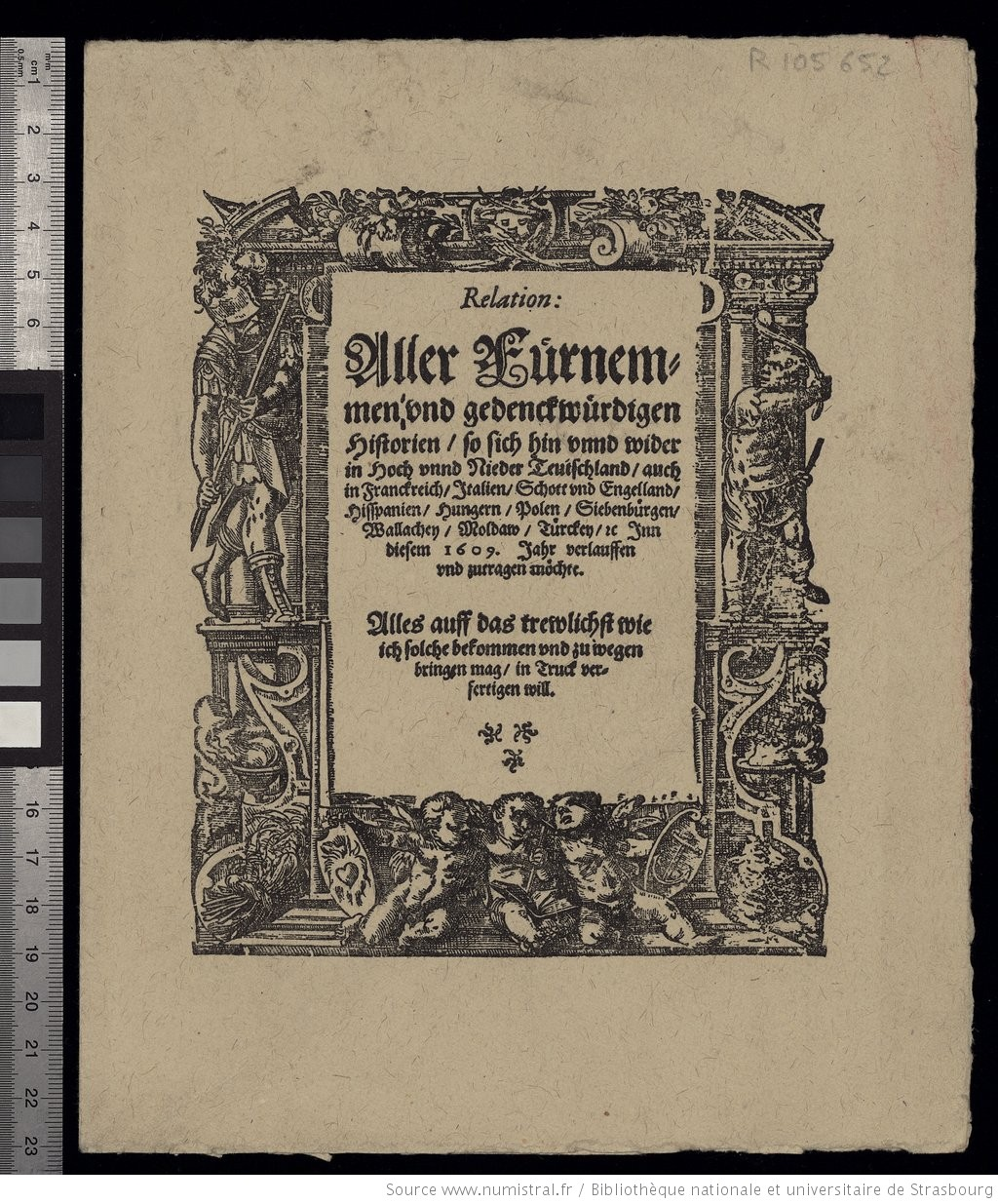
Title page of the Relation (1609), the earliest newspaper

The newspaper is an application of the printing press from which the press derives its name. The 16th century sees a rising demand for up-to-date information which can not be covered effectively by the circulating hand-written newssheets. For "gaining time" from the slow copying process, Johann Carolus of Strassburg is the first to publish his German-language Relation by using a printing press (1605). In rapid succession, further German newspapers are established in Wolfenbüttel (Avisa Relation oder Zeitung), Basel, Frankfurt and Berlin. From 1618 onwards, enterprising Dutch printers take up the practice and begin to provide the English and French market with translated news. By the mid-17th century it is estimated that political newspapers which enjoyed the widest popularity reach up to 250,000 readers in the Holy Roman Empire, around one quarter of the literate population.

Air-gun

In 1607 Bartolomeo Crescentio described an air gun equipped with a powerful spiral spring, a device so complex that it must have had predecessors. In 1610 Mersenne spoke in detail of "sclopeti pneumatici constructio", and four years later Wilkins wrote enthusiastically of "that late ingenious invention the wind-gun" as being "almost equall to our powder-guns". In the 1650s Otto von Guericke, famed for his experiments with vacua and pressures, built the Madeburger Windbuchse, one of the technical wonders of its time.

== Tools, devices, work processes ==
=== 15th century ===
Cranked Archimedes' screw

The German engineer Konrad Kyeser equips in his Bellifortis (1405) the Archimedes' screw with a crank mechanism which soon replaces the ancient practice of working the pipe by treading.

Cranked reel

In the textile industry, cranked reels for winding skeins of yarn were introduced in the early 15th century.

Brace

The earliest carpenter's braces equipped with a U-shaped grip, that is with a compound crank, appears between 1420 and 1430 in Flanders.

Cranked well-hoist

The earliest evidence for the fitting of a well-hoist with cranks is found in a miniature of c. 1425 in the German Hausbuch of the Mendel Foundation.

Paddle wheel boat powered by crank and connecting rod mechanism

While paddle wheel boats powered by manually turned crankshafts were already conceived of by earlier writers such as Guido da Vigevano and the Anonymous Author of the Hussite Wars, the Italian Roberto Valturio much improves on the design in 1463 by devising a boat with five sets of parallel cranks which are all joined to a single power source by one connecting rod; the idea is also taken up by his compatriot Francesco di Giorgio.

Rotary grindstone with treadle

Evidence for rotary grindstones operated by a crank handle goes back to the Carolingian Utrecht Psalter. Around 1480, the crank mechanism is further mechanized by adding a treadle.

Geared hand-mill

The geared hand-mill, operated either with one or two cranks, appears in the 15th century.

=== 16th century ===
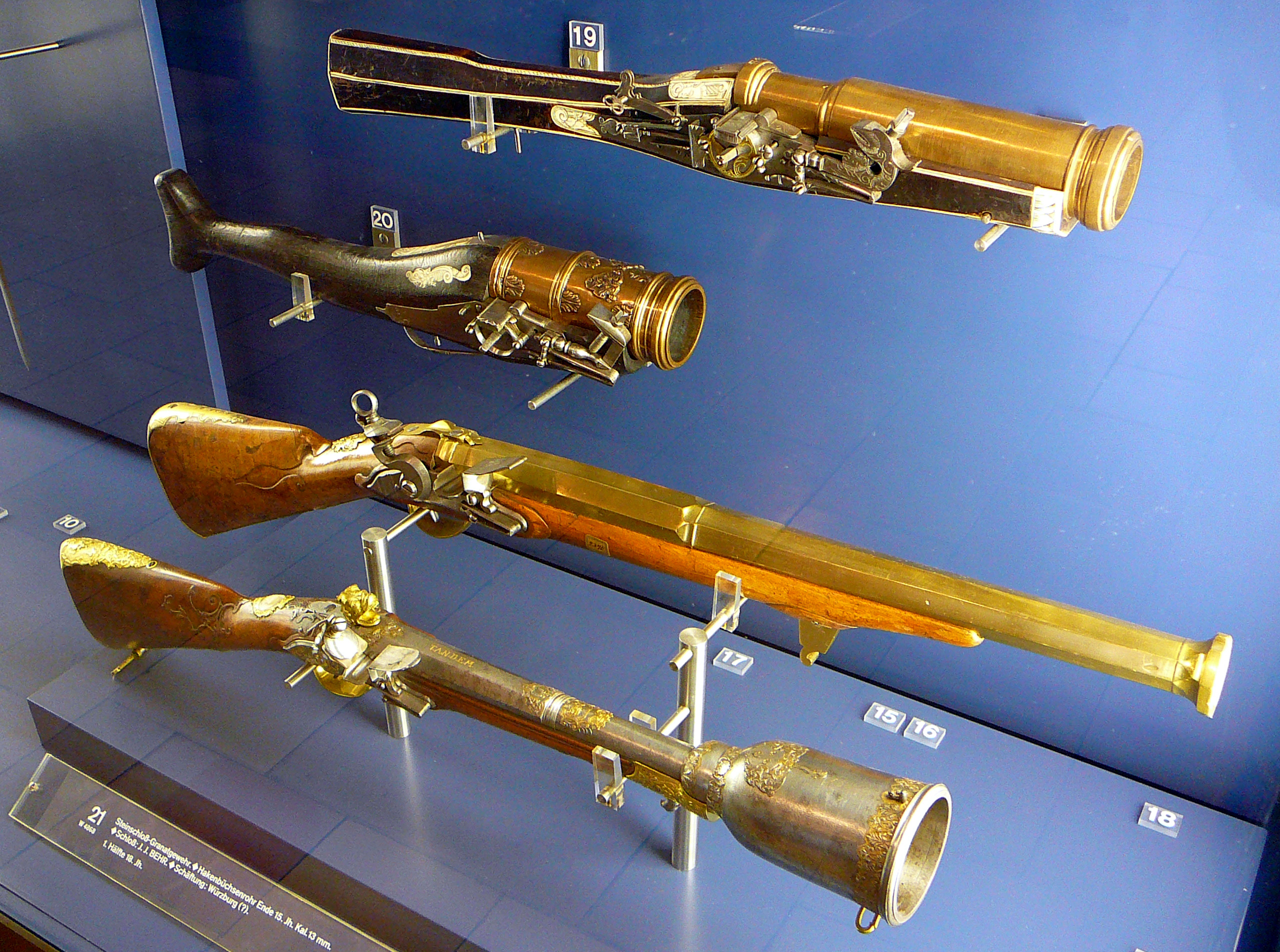
German grenade muskets from the 16th century (the two upper ones)

Grenade musket

Two 16th-century German grenade muskets working with a wheellock mechanism are on display in the Bayerisches Nationalmuseum, Munich.

== Technical drawings of artist-engineers ==
The revived scientific spirit of the age can perhaps be best exemplified by the voluminous corpus of technical drawings which the artist-engineers left behind, reflecting the wide variety of interests the Renaissance homo universalis pursued. The establishment of the laws of linear perspective by Brunelleschi gave his successors, such as Taccola, Francesco di Giorgio Martini and Leonardo da Vinci, a powerful instrument to depict mechanical devices for the first time in a realistic manner. The extant sketch books give modern historians of science invaluable insights into the standards of technology of the time. Renaissance engineers showed a strong proclivity to experimental study, drawing a variety of technical devices, many of which appeared for the first time in history on paper.

However, these designs were not always intended to be put into practice, and often practical limitations impeded the application of the revolutionary designs. For example, da Vinci's ideas on the conical parachute or the winged flying machine were only applied much later. While earlier scholars showed a tendency to attribute inventions based on their first pictorial appearance to individual Renaissance engineers, modern scholarship is more prone to view the devices as products of a technical evolution which often went back to the Middle Ages.

| Technology | Date | Author | Treatise | Comment |
|---|---|---|---|---|
| Pile driver | 1475 | Francesco di Giorgio Martini | Trattato di Architectura | Drawing of such a device whose principle must be according to the Brazilian historian of technology Ladislao Reti "considered original with Franceso". |
| Centrifugal pump | 1475 | Francesco di Giorgio Martini | Trattato di Architectura | Water or mud-lifting machine "that must be characterized as the prototype of the centrifugal pump". |

== See also ==
- Chariot clock
- History of science in the Renaissance
- Renaissance magic
