= Jackson's Island =

Jackson's Island can refer to:

- Jackson Island in Franz Josef Land, Russia
- Jackson Island (Nunavut) in Canada
- Jackson's Island, a Mississippi River island near Hannibal, Missouri described in Adventures of Huckleberry Finn, based on Pearl_Island_(Illinois).
