= Milford, Derbyshire =

Village in Derbyshire, England

Coordinates: 53.00209°N 1.48140°W

Milford
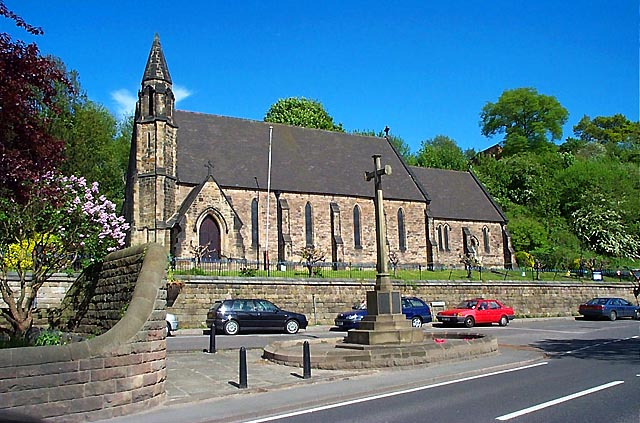
- Milford Church

- Location within Derbyshire
- Civil parish: Belper
- District: Amber Valley
- Shire county: Derbyshire
- Region: East Midlands
- Country: England
- Sovereign state: United Kingdom
- Post town: BELPER
- Postcode district: DE56
- Dialling code: 01773

Milford is a village in the civil parish of Belper, in the Amber Valley district, in the county of Derbyshire, England. It is on the River Derwent, between Duffield and Belper on the A6 trunk road.

Until the end of the 18th century it was no more than a few houses near the point, about a quarter of a mile further south, where a Roman road from the Wirksworth lead mines forded the river. The road still exists as it passes across the Chevin hill and descends into the village by what is now Sunny Hill. It is thought to have then proceeded along the east bank of the river to the Roman garrison of Derventio, in what is now Derby where it connected with Rykneld Street.

At nearby Makeney, in 1554, Burchard Kranich built the first Smeltmill for extracting lead from its ore. In 1581 Sir John Zouch of Codnor Castle set up a wire drawing works. This followed the opening of a works in Hathersage in 1566 where Christopher Schutz, a German immigrant, had invented a process for drawing wire. Hathersage became a centre for wire drawing and, later, needle making.

Of Makeney, it was written in 1817, Makeney, a hamlet of [the parish of Duffield], (Machenie), is described in the Domesday Survey as one of the manors of Henry de Ferrars. It is now considered as parcel of the manor of Duffield.
About 700 hands are employed by Messrs. Strutt in the spinning and bleaching of cotton, at Millford, a populous manufacturing village in this parish.
There is a Unitarian chapel at Millford, supported by Mr. Strutt; who supports also a Lancasterian school, in which the numbers are about 300: a room to accommodate about 400 is now building at Millford. The girls in this school, and that at Belper, are taught to sew, cut out, &c. as well as to read and write. A chapel has lately been erected here for the Wesleyan Methodists.

The Royal Mint had acquired the rights to Schutz' process in 1568 and set out to restrict its use to the Company of Mineral and Battery Works. However, the works continued supplying the Belper nail makers among others and by the time Jedediah Strutt bought it, it consisted of two forges and a slitting and rolling mill, occupying both sides the river. Some of the mill buildings are now the Riverside Garden Centre.

In 1778 Jedediah Strutt built cotton spinning mills after the pattern developed by Richard Arkwright having been in partnership with him when he built the mill at Cromford. Part of the Milford mill still exists as well as much of the workers' housing. Milford's claim to fame is that one of Strutt's apprentices at Milford was Samuel Slater, who absconded to America carrying Arkwright's system in his head. He settled in Pawtucket, Rhode Island and replicated Arkwright's success.

There is some debate about the origin of the name Milford. It is generally reckoned to be a corruption of mule forde and it is so recorded (briefly) in the Domesday Book when it was owned by Henry de Ferrers. There were a number of fords, which probably changed their position as the river changed its course. An old lane leading down to one of them was called "Save Penny Lane," because people who used it, and crossed the ford, saved the penny toll which Messrs. Strutt charged for crossing the bridge they had built. Afterwards, the Strutts had the ford destroyed and the river deepened. At some time, however, Milford was called New Mills. A map of 1787 names the road from Duffield as New Mills Road, and Samuel Slater's indentures as an apprentice record him as living in "New Mills, in the Parish of Duffield".

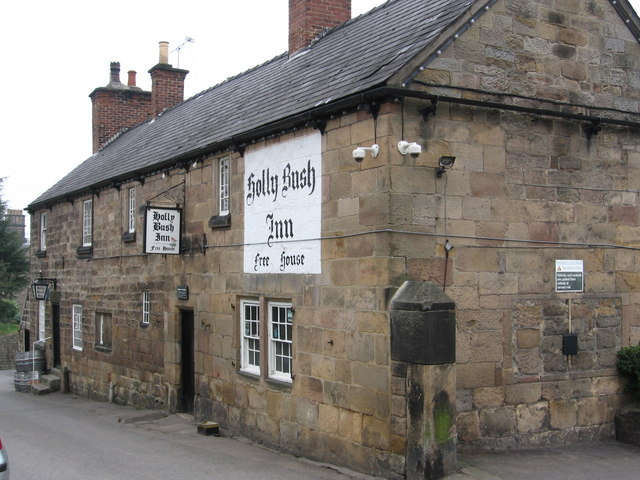
The Holly Bush Inn

The Holly Bush Inn is a 17th or early 18th century Grade II listed public house at 2 Holly Bush Lane, Makeney (part of Milford). It is on the Campaign for Real Ale's National Inventory of Historic Pub Interiors.

== Governance ==
Milford was formerly a chapelry in the parish of Duffield; on 1 October 1897 Milford became a separate civil parish, on 1 April 1934 the parish was transferred from Belper Rural District to Belper Urban District, and on 1 April 1974 the parish was abolished and merged with Belper, the successor parish to the urban district. In 1951 the parish had a population of 1235.

== See also ==
- Listed buildings in Belper
- Milford Hydro
