= Corslet =

Piece of defensive armour

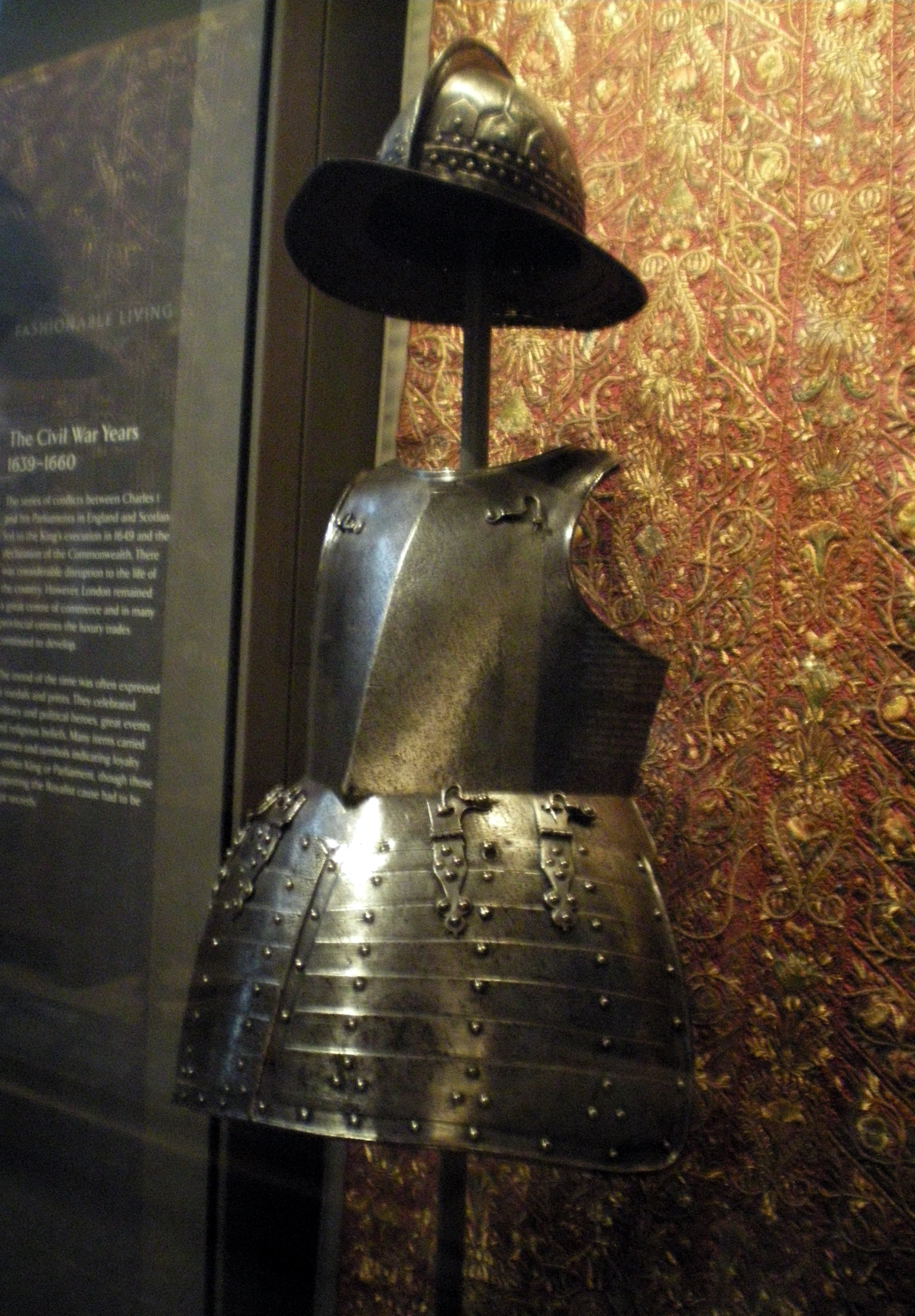
English helmet and corslet, ca. 1620

A corslet or corselet is defined by the Oxford English Dictionary as "a piece of defensive armour covering the body" and is first attested around 1500.

Such pieces of armour have existed in various forms under various names throughout much of history, designed to protect the vital organs, arteries and nerves in the abdomen, chest and back.

By the 16th century, the corslet became popular as a light-half-armour for general military use, e.g., by town guards. It consisted of two plates connected on the sides via hinges and pins that could include a gorget and tassets, and combined with full arms and gauntlets.

The word corslet was adopted as a so-called "occupational surname," later altered to Coslett, Cosslett, Coslet, etc., following the arrival of an expert in the manufacture of osmond iron, Corslet Tinkhaus, to Wales from his native Westphalia in 1567.

According to Webster's Third New International Dictionary, corslet also refers to a soldier equipped with a corslet.
