= The Adventures of Huckleberry Finn (1960 film) =

1960 film

- Film poster
- Directed by: Michael Curtiz
- Screenplay by: James Lee
- Based on: The Adventures of Huckleberry Finn; 1884 novel by Mark Twain
- Produced by: Samuel Goldwyn Jr.
- Starring: Eddie Hodges; Archie Moore; Tony Randall; Neville Brand
- Cinematography: Ted D. McCord
- Edited by: Fredric Steinkamp
- Music by: Jerome Moross
- Production companies: Metro-Goldwyn-Mayer; Formosa Productions, Inc.
- Distributed by: Loew's Inc.
- Release date: August 3, 1960 (U.S.)
- Running time: 107 minutes
- Country: United States
- Language: English
- Budget: $1,357,000
- Box office: $2,750,000

The Adventures of Huckleberry Finn is a 1960 American adventure drama film directed by Michael Curtiz. Based on the 1884 novel of the same name by Mark Twain, it was the third sound film version of the story and the second filmed by Metro-Goldwyn-Mayer. The film was the first adaptation of Huckleberry Finn to be filmed in CinemaScope and Technicolor. It stars Eddie Hodges as Huck and former boxer Archie Moore as the runaway slave Jim. Tony Randall also appeared in the film (and received top billing), and Buster Keaton had a bit role in what proved to be his final film for Metro-Goldwyn-Mayer, his former studio. Neville Brand portrayed Pap Finn, Huck's alcoholic father.

Some scenes in the film were shot on the Sacramento River, which doubled for the Mississippi River.

== Plot ==
Huckleberry "Huck" Finn is a young boy living in the fictional town of St. Petersburg, Missouri, along the Mississippi River, in the American Midwest before the Civil War. Huck has been taken in by the Widow Douglas and her sister, Miss Watson, who seek to teach him manners, religion, and education. Huck remains restless and dreams of a life free from adult rules and structured society. Huck's peace is disrupted when his alcoholic and abusive father, Pap Finn, returns to town and manipulates the court into granting him custody of his son. Huck is locked away in a remote cabin deep in the woods and physically abused. Staging his own murder using pig's blood, Huck flees to Jackson's Island, an isolated stretch of land in the Mississippi River.

Huck encounters Jim, Miss Watson's enslaved servant, on the island. He has also run away after learning he's to be sold to a plantation. Huck, raised to consider slaves as property, grows to respect Jim's humanity and considers him a friend. Jim plans to travel north to Cairo, Illinois, where he hopes to earn enough money to buy his family's freedom. Huck and Jim begin a journey by raft down the Mississippi River, seeking freedom and escape.

They find a dead body inside a house floating in the river. Jim refuses to let Huck look at the face, claiming it's too gruesome. Further on, they meet two a pair of confidence tricksters on the run claiming to be a displaced English duke and the long-lost French king. Huck recognizes them as frauds, buy welcomes them aboard the raft to avoid trouble. The conmen carry out elaborate schemes in various towns they stop in, performing fake Shakespearean plays and swindling money from grieving families. When they pretend to be the long-lost brothers of Peter Wilks, a recently deceased man who left behind a fortune, the town initially believes their story. Huck, moved by the kindness of Wilks's nieces, secretly hides the money the conmen plan to steal.

The arrival of the real brothers exposes the frauds, and the duke and the king barely escape from an angry mob. The conmen sell Jim to the Phelps family, claiming he is a runaway slave. The Phelpses, relatives of Huck's friend Tom Sawyer, intend to return Jim to obtain a reward. Huck sneaks onto the Phelps property in disguise and finds Jim locked in a shed. He writes a letter to Miss Watson, his owner, revealing Jim's location, but tears up the letter and decides he'd rather help Jim than conform to society's racist values.

The king and duke are captured after another attempted scam. Their arrest provides a diversion enabling Huck to free Jim, and they escape back to the raft. Jim reveals the dead man in the floating house had been Pap Finn, and Huck is now free from his abusive father. They learn that Miss Watson had died and emancipated Jim in her will. Jim continues north to find his family, and Huck, rejecting the idea of returning to civilization, decides to "light out for the Territory" in search of freedom and adventure.

== Cast ==
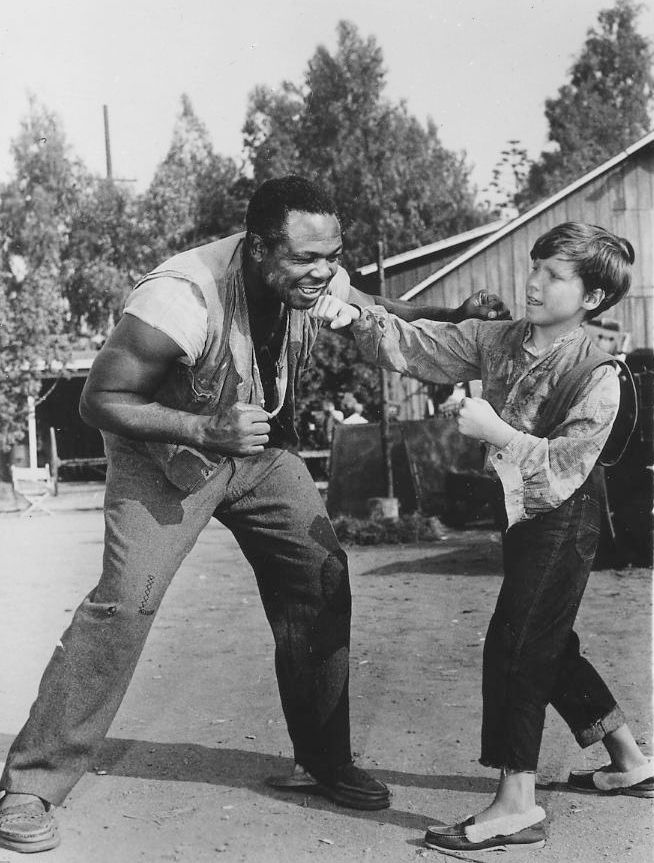
Archie Moore and Eddie Hodges on set

- Eddie Hodges as Huckleberry Finn
- Archie Moore as Jim
- Tony Randall as The King of France
- Patty McCormack as Joanna Wilkes
- Neville Brand as Pap Finn
- Mickey Shaughnessy as The Duke
- Judy Canova as Sheriff's Wife
- Andy Devine as Mr. Carmody
- Sherry Jackson as Mary Jane Wilkes
- Buster Keaton as Lion Tamer
- Finlay Currie as Capt. Sellers
- Josephine Hutchinson as Widow Douglas
- Sterling Holloway as the Barber
- Parley Baer as Grangeford Man
- John Carradine as Slave Catcher
- Royal Dano as Sheriff of Harlan
- Dean Stanton as Slave Catcher
- Dolores Hawkins as Riverboat Singer

== Music ==
Jerome Moross composed the score. MGM had intended the film to be a musical. Burton Lane and Alan Jay Lerner wrote songs which were not used in their entirety, but which Moross incorporated into the score as source (diegetic) music.

== Box office ==
According to MGM records the film earned $1,950,000 in the U.S. and Canada and $800,000 elsewhere, resulting in a net loss of $99,000.

== Comic book adaptation ==
- Dell Four Color #1114 (July 1960)

== See also ==
- List of films featuring slavery
