= Giovanni Battista Agnello =

Venetian alchemist

Giovanni Battista Agnello (fl. 1560–1577) was a Venetian alchemist working in London in the 1560s and 1570s. He was the author of the second book in Italian printed in England, Espositione sopra vn libro intitolato Apocalypsis spiritus secreti. He was also the first to declare that the ore brought back by Martin Frobisher from Baffin Island contained gold.

== Arrival in England ==
Agnello described himself on the title page of a published work in 1566 as 'Giovanbatista Agnello Venetiano'; however the date of his arrival in England from his native Venice is unknown. According to Castells, he was among a number of 'Protestant men of learning who came to London as a result of the Reformation'. Some sources state that he was the 'J.B. Agnelli' authorized to import gold bullion for use in English coinage from 1547 to 1549. However Jones states that Agnello did not arrive in England until 1569. According to Harkness, he lived in the parish of St Helen's Bishopsgate, and operated a 'dangerous blast furnace' there. What is known with certainty is that Agnello was recommended to Sir William Cecil by Jean de Ferrieres (1520–1586), the Vidame of Chartres, who on 4 November 1569 wrote to Cecil from Holborn commending Agnello as 'a man of honest and industry'. With his letter, the Vidame sent Cecil a copy of Agnello's book, saying that he wished it had been printed on cleaner paper, 'but that of dusky hue best suits the works of Vulcanicorum hominum'.

Shortly after this, Agnello suggested a plan to Queen Elizabeth I to make lead testons and to remedy the 'scarcity of pence, half pence, and other small coins'.

== Frobisher voyages ==
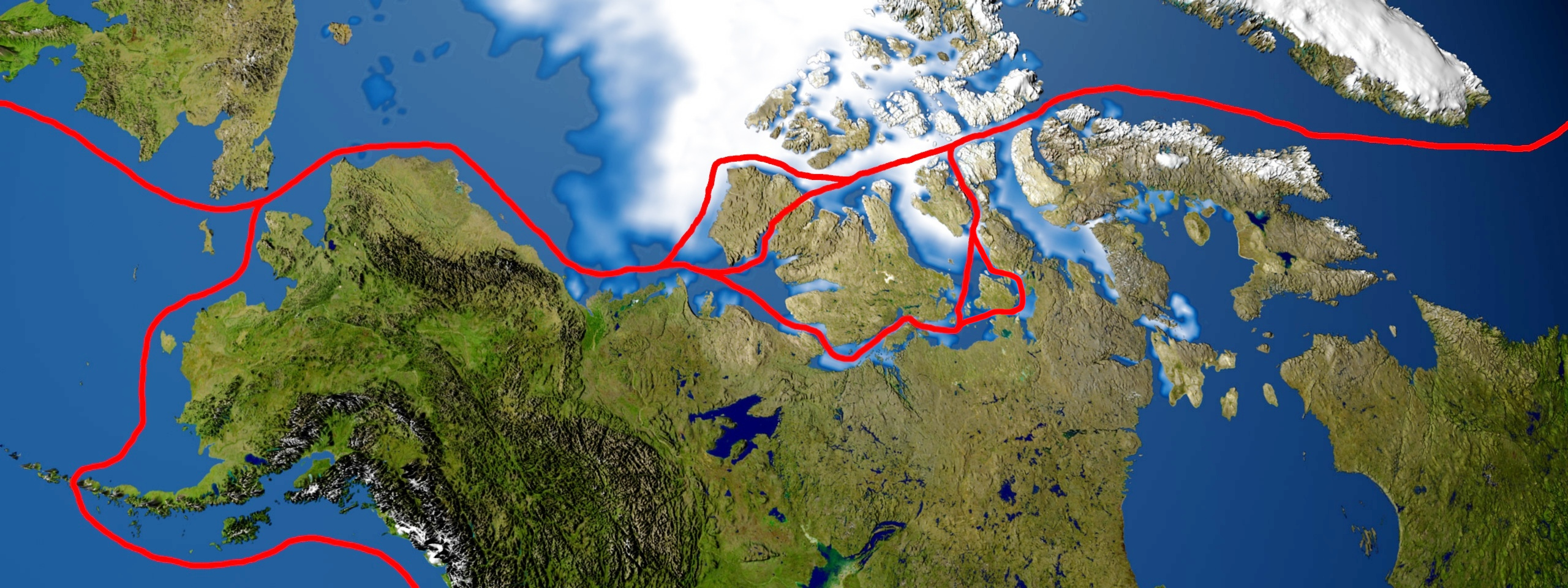
The Northwest Passage

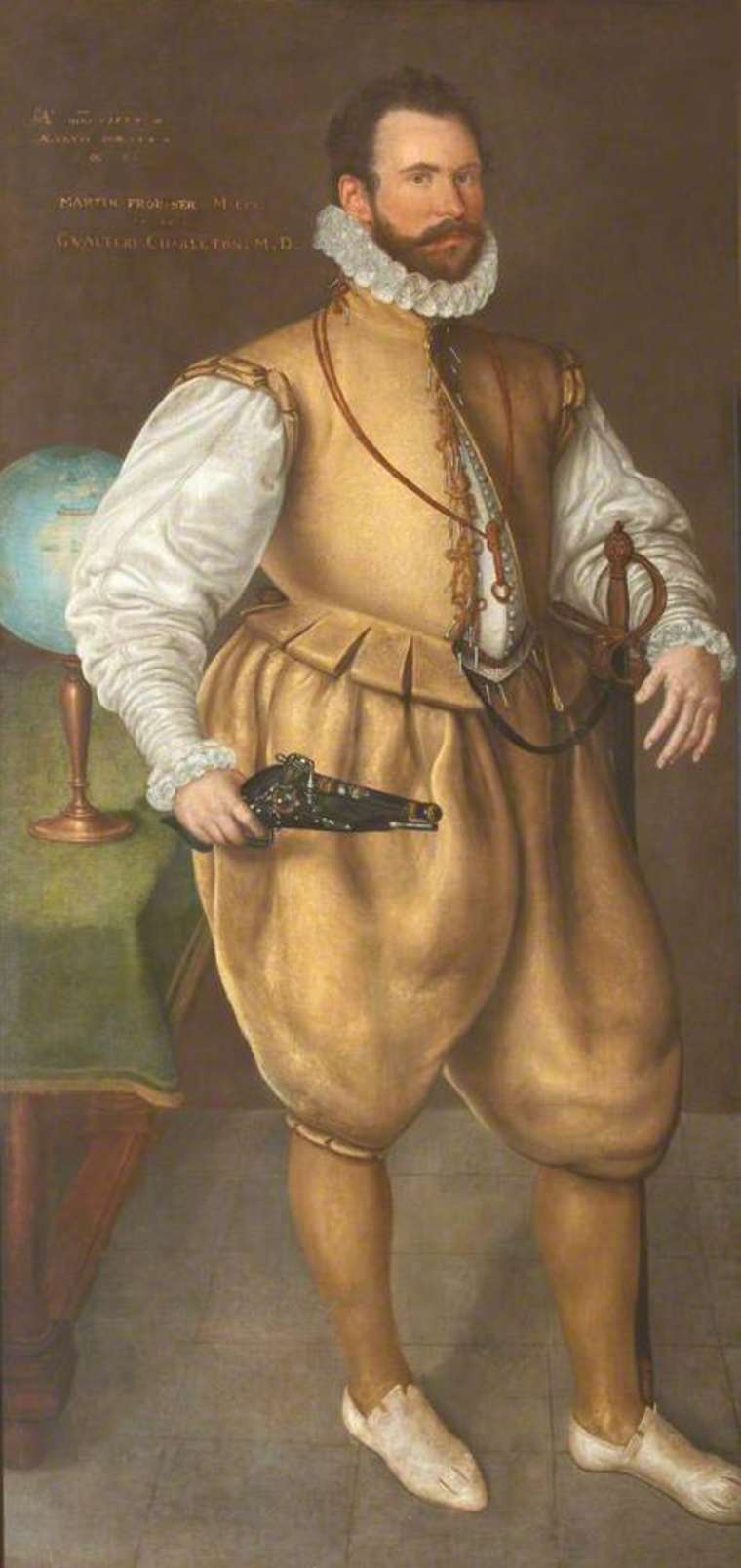
Martin Frobisher

=== Initial discovery of the ore ===
At the beginning of January 1577 Agnello was approached by Michael Lok, one of the principal backers of Martin Frobisher's first voyage in 1576 to the Canadian Arctic in search of the Northwest Passage. On the voyage a black stone 'as great as a half-penny loaf' had been collected loose on the surface of Hall's Island off Baffin Island by Robert Garrard, who took it to be sea coal, of which they had need.

In a letter to the Queen on 22 April 1577 Lok stated that the stone was presented to him on Frobisher's ship on 13 October 1576 in the presence of Rowland Yorke as 'the first thing Frobisher had found in the new land'. The only contemporary account of what happened next is found in George Best's True Discourse:

After his arrival in London, being demanded of sundry his friends what thing he had brought them home of that country, [Frobisher] had nothing left to present them withal but a piece of this black stone. And it fortuned a gentlewoman, one of the adventurer’s wives, to have a piece thereof, which by chance she threw and burned in the fire so long that at the length being taken forth and quenched in a little vinegar it glistered with a bright marquesset of gold. Whereupon the matter being called in some question, it was brought to certain goldfinders in London to make assay thereof, who indeed found it to hold gold, and that very richly for the quantity. Afterwards the same goldfinders promised great matters thereof if there were any store to be found, and offered themselves to adventure for the searching of those parts from whence the same was brought. Some that had great hope of the matter sought secretly to have a lease at her Majesty’s hands of those places, whereby to enjoy the mass of so great a public profit unto their own private gains. In conclusion, the hope of the same gold ore to be found kindled a greater opinion in the hearts of many to advance the voyage again.

Best does not identify the adventurer's wife; modern sources conclude that she was Michael Lok's second wife, Margery Perient (died c.1583), the widow of Cesare Adelmare, a Venetian like Agnello. Doubt has been cast on Best's account, however, since there is no mention of Margery Lok's involvement in the voluminous depositions and letters of Michael Lok himself.

Irrespective of whether the story of Lok's wife's actions is to be believed, extant documents confirm that Lok suspected that the stone might contain gold, and took pieces of it for analysis to William Williams, Assay Master of the Mint, and to two members of the Worshipful Company of Goldsmiths: one Wheeler, a gold refiner, and George Needham, Assay Master of the Society of the Mines Royal, none of whom found any trace of gold.

=== Tests ===
Despite these negative results Lok persisted, and in early January 1577 took three small pieces of the stone to Agnello, as described in one of Lok's later depositions:

In the beginning of January I delivered a small piece thereof to John Baptista Agnello, not telling what nor from whence, but prayed him to prove what metal was therein. And within three days I came to him for answer. He showed me a very little powder of gold, saying it came thereout, and willed me to give him another piece to make a better proof. I did so, and within three days again he showed me more powder of gold. I told him I would not believe it without better proof. He asked another piece to make a better proof, saying that he would make anatomy thereof. I gave it him saying that I marvelled much of his doings sith I had given pieces to other 3 to make proof who could find no such thing there. He answered me, Bisogna sapere adulare la natura.

Lok was secretly reporting the results of the assays to Sir Francis Walsingham, who had Sir Edward Dyer analyse a sample of the ore. Dyer found no gold, confirming Walsingham in his view that Agnello's results were 'but an alchemist matter'. Agnello and Lok were not discouraged; Agnello advised Lok that he had a 'friend in the court' who would move the Queen to grant them a licence to mine the ore, and on 19 March 1557 Lok and Agnello entered into an agreement for bringing back to England more ore like the original black stone. However, by then the secret had leaked out, largely through Agnello's own indiscretion. Sir William Winter asked to meet with Lok on 29 March, and revealed that he had learned of Agnello's assays of the ore from Sir William Morgan, who had had the news from Sir John Berkeley, who had had it from Agnello himself. Moreover, not only had Agnello communicated his findings to Berkeley, but he had been assisted in some of his tests by Christopher Schutz, a German metallurgist working in London who had been introduced to Agnello by Berkeley and Morgan. According to Winter, the matter was of too great importance for himself and Lok, and fit only for 'the Prince'. In a lengthy letter dated 22 April 1577 Lok outlined all these matters to the Queen, and enclosed therewith six 'writings' to him from Agnello, as well as a copy of the contract signed by himself and Agnello.

=== Second voyage, further testing of the ore ===
Agnello was later involved in assaying the tons of black ore brought back to England on Frobisher's second voyage to Baffin Island in 1577. Between 1 November 1577 and 6 March 1578 Christopher Schutz performed three 'great proofes' of this ore. Agnello and another German metallurgist working in England, Burchard Kranich, also assayed the ore. Kranich and Schutz were soon at odds, with Schutz accusing Kranich, who was favoured by Martin Frobisher, of 'evil manners and ignorance'. Numerous documents survive showing Kranich's involvement in the assaying of the ore, including a letter of 26 November 1577 in which Kranich reported to Sir Francis Walsingham on the amount of gold found in his tests. Amid growing doubts about the value of the ore, Kranich insisted that it contained a significant amount of gold, and asked for £200 and a daily wage of £1 to refine it. On 20 December 1577 Agnello submitted his own report to Walsingham on the amount of gold to be found in the ore. According to Castells an English alchemist named George Wolfe was then brought in to assist Agnello; there were disagreements as to methodology, after which Agnello was 'shut out of the enterprise'.

=== Results ===
Despite the favourable findings of Schutz, Kranich and Agnello, the hornblende ore from Baffin Island contained no gold, and it was later alleged by Robert Denham, who had assisted Kranich with his tests, that Kranich had added gold and silver coins of his own to bring the projected value of the refined ore to £50 per ton. The story that Kranich allegedly doctored the assay tests is found in a deposition to the Privy Council by Michael Lok; in the deposition Lok claims that the evidence of Kranich's fraud was presented to Lord Burghley at his house in the Strand in the presence of Lok, Sir Walter Mildmay, and all the Commissioners involved in supervising the Frobisher expeditions.

Modern research has confirmed that the 1,400 tonnes of ore brought back to England from Baffin Island in 1577 and 1578 were not gold-bearing. Moreover, the original black stone on which Agnello conducted his tests in January 1577 had been found on Hall's Island during the 1576 voyage; according to Michael Lok's account, no ore was discovered during a search of Hall's Island on the second voyage of 1577, and Frobisher 'never after brought home one stone more of that rich ore which he brought in the first voyage, for there was none of it to be found'.

Despite having been the first to declare that the ultimately worthless ore contained gold, Agnello appears to have survived the Frobisher debacle relatively unscathed. Investors, including prominent courtiers such as Edward de Vere, 17th Earl of Oxford, who invested £3,000, lost heavily, and the lawsuits that followed ruined Michael Lok.

Agnello's date of death is unknown.

== Literary works ==
In 1566 Agnello published in London his Espositione di Giouanbatista Agnello Venetiano sopra vn libro intitolato Apocalypsis spiritus secreti, only the second book in Italian printed in England. The original work was an eight-page book in Latin, which Agnello translated into Italian and elaborated with his own commentary. According to Linden, Agnello's purpose in the work is to explain the world soul in alchemical terms.

Agnello's 1566 publication was translated into English in 1623 as A Revelation of the Secret Spirit, with a dedication to John Thornborough, Bishop of Worcester. The translator, 'R.N.E., gentleman', is thought to be Robert Napier. On the title page of the 1623 publication Agnello is referred to as 'John Baptista Lambye', which has on occasion resulted in the mistaken attribution of the 1566 publication to a Venetian named 'Giovanni Lambi'.
