= Lon R. Shelby =

American academic (1935–2018)

Lonnie Royce Shelby
- Born: August 2, 1935; Texas
- Died: April 8, 2018 (aged 82)
- Education: Southern Illinois University, Vanderbilt University
- Scientific career
- Fields: Speech Communication, History of Technology

Lonnie Royce (Lon. R.) Shelby (August 2, 1935 – April 8, 2018) was an American academic, and Professor Emeritus of Speech Communication and former Dean of the College of Liberal Arts at the Southern Illinois University. He is known for his work on Mediaeval architects and design, especially on the work of Lorenz Lechler, Mathes Roriczer, Hanns Schmuttermayer, Taccola and Villard de Honnecourt. He is also known for coining the term constructive geometry.

== Biography ==
Born in Texas as son of Mr. and Mrs. C.L. Shelby, Shelby attended Irving High School, and obtained his BA in History, his MA from Vanderbilt University, and his PhD from the University of North Carolina at Chapel Hill in 1962 with the thesis, entitled "The technical supervision of masonry construction in medieval England."

After graduation Shelby started his academic career at the Southern Illinois University, where he served his whole career. He started as lecturer in history, became assistant professor of history in 1963, associate professor in history in 1966, and associate dean of the Graduate School in 1968, and eventually Professor of Sociology.

After his retirement in the new millennium he was appointed Professor Emeritus of Speech Communication at the Southern Illinois University.

== Work ==
=== The geometrical knowledge of mediaeval master masons, 1972 ===
In the 1972 article "The geometrical knowledge of mediaeval master masons," Shelby reconstructed the knowledge of practical geometry in the realm of the mason. About the motivation of this study Shelby (1972) explained that:

Techniques of surveying, Villard de Honnecourt, 1230-35.

"...during the past one hundred and fifty years numerous scholars have searched for the geometrical canons which supposedly were used by master masons in the design and construction of mediaeval churches. But in this search for one of the keys to an understanding of mediaeval architecture, these scholars have seldom asked themselves what was the actual character and content of the geometrical knowledge which a mediaeval master mason might have been expected to possess?"

In his paper Shelby attempted to answer this particular question. After reconsidering the normal kind of education in those days with the trivium and quadrivium, Shelby suggested, that it appears, that medieval master masons didn't receive their geometrical knowledge from formal schooling but from oral tradition. This tradition, however, disappeared at the close of the Gothic building in Europe in the 14th century with the dying of the oral tradition in general. Instead little books on the technical aspects of building emerged in the late Middle Ages. Also medieval scholars had an interest in practical geometry, and shared their thoughts on this topic in numerous treatises.

After comparison geometrical works and classical geometry of Euclid and Archimedes Shelby finds hardly any resemblance. According to Shelby (1972):

"Mathematically speaking, it was simple in the extreme; once it is recognized that there was virtually no Euclidean-type reasoning involved, the way is cleared for understanding the kind of geometrical thinking which the masons did employ. This non-mathematical technique I have labelled constructive geometry, to indicate the masons’ concern with the construction and manipulation of geometrical forms. It becomes evident that the “art of geometry” for mediaeval masons meant the ability to perceive design and building problems in terms of a few basic geometrical figures which could be manipulated through a series of carefully prescribed steps to produce the points, lines and curves needed for the solution of the problems. Since these problems ranged across the entire spectrum of the work of the masons — stereotomy, statics, proportion, architectural design and drawings — the search by modern scholars for the geometrical canons of mediaeval architecture is appropriate enough, so long as we keep clearly in mind the kind of geometry that was actually used by the masons. The nature of that geometry suggests that these canons, when recovered, will not be universal laws which will at last provide the key to mediaeval architecture; rather, they will be particular procedures used by particular master masons at particular times and places."

== Reception ==
In the Arts of the Medieval Cathedrals Nolan and Sandron (2016) credited Shelby's translations and commentaries on early medieval works on construction, stating:

"Many scholars have discussed these booklets over the years, but Lon R. Shelby's translation and commentaries remain the primary source to this day..."

== Selected publications ==
- Shelby, Lonnie Royce, The technical supervision of masonry construction in medieval England, University of North Carolina at Chapel Hill, 1962.
- Shelby, Lonnie Royce, John Rogers: Tudor military engineer, 1967.
- Shelby, Lonnie Royce, Gothic design techniques : the fifteenth-century design booklets of Mathes Roriczer and Hanns Schmuttermayer, Carbondale: Southern Illinois University Press, 1977.

Articles, a selection

- Shelby, Lon R. "The role of the master mason in mediaeval English building." Speculum 39.3 (1964): 387-403.
- Shelby, Lon R. "Medieval Masons' Tools. II. Compass and Square." Technology and culture 6.2 (1965): 236-248.
- Lon R. Shelby. "Mediaeval Masons' Templates," Journal of the Society of Architectural Historians, Vol. 30 No. 2, May, 1971; (pp. 140–154)
- Shelby, Lon R. "The geometrical knowledge of mediaeval master masons." Speculum 47.3 (1972): 395-421.
- Lon R. Shelby, "Mariano Taccola and His Books on Engines and Machines", Technology and Culture, Vol. 16, No. 3. (Jul., 1975), pp. 466–475
- Barnes, Carl F., and Lon R. Shelby. "The Codicology of the Portfolio of Villard de Honnecourt (Paris, Bibliothèque Nationale, MS FR. 19093)." Scriptorium 42.1 (1988): 20-48.
