= Smeltmill =

Variety of lead smelter

Smeltmills were water-powered mills used to smelt lead or other metals.

The older method of smelting lead on wind-blown bole hills began to be superseded by artificially-blown smelters. The first such furnace was built by Burchard Kranich at Makeney, Derbyshire in 1554, but produced less good lead than the older bole hill. William Humfrey (the Queen's assay master), and a leading shareholder in the Company of Mineral and Battery Works introduced the ore hearth from the Mendips about 1577. This was initially blown by a foot-blast, but was soon developed into a water-powered smelt mill at Beauchief (now a suburb of Sheffield).

A typical smelt mill had an orehearth and a slaghearth, the latter being used to reprocess slags from the orehearth in order to recover further lead from the slag
