= Burchard Kranich =

German mining engineer and physician

Burchard Kranich (c. 1515–1578) (also known as Doctor Burcot) was a mining engineer and physician who came to England from Germany. He was involved in mining ventures in Derbyshire and Cornwall, and in assaying the black ore, thought to be gold-bearing, brought back to England from Baffin Island by Martin Frobisher. He later practised as a physician in London, where he enjoyed a mixed reputation, and is said to have attended Elizabeth I when she contracted smallpox. He is alluded to in several literary works published during the reigns of Elizabeth I and James I.

== Early career ==
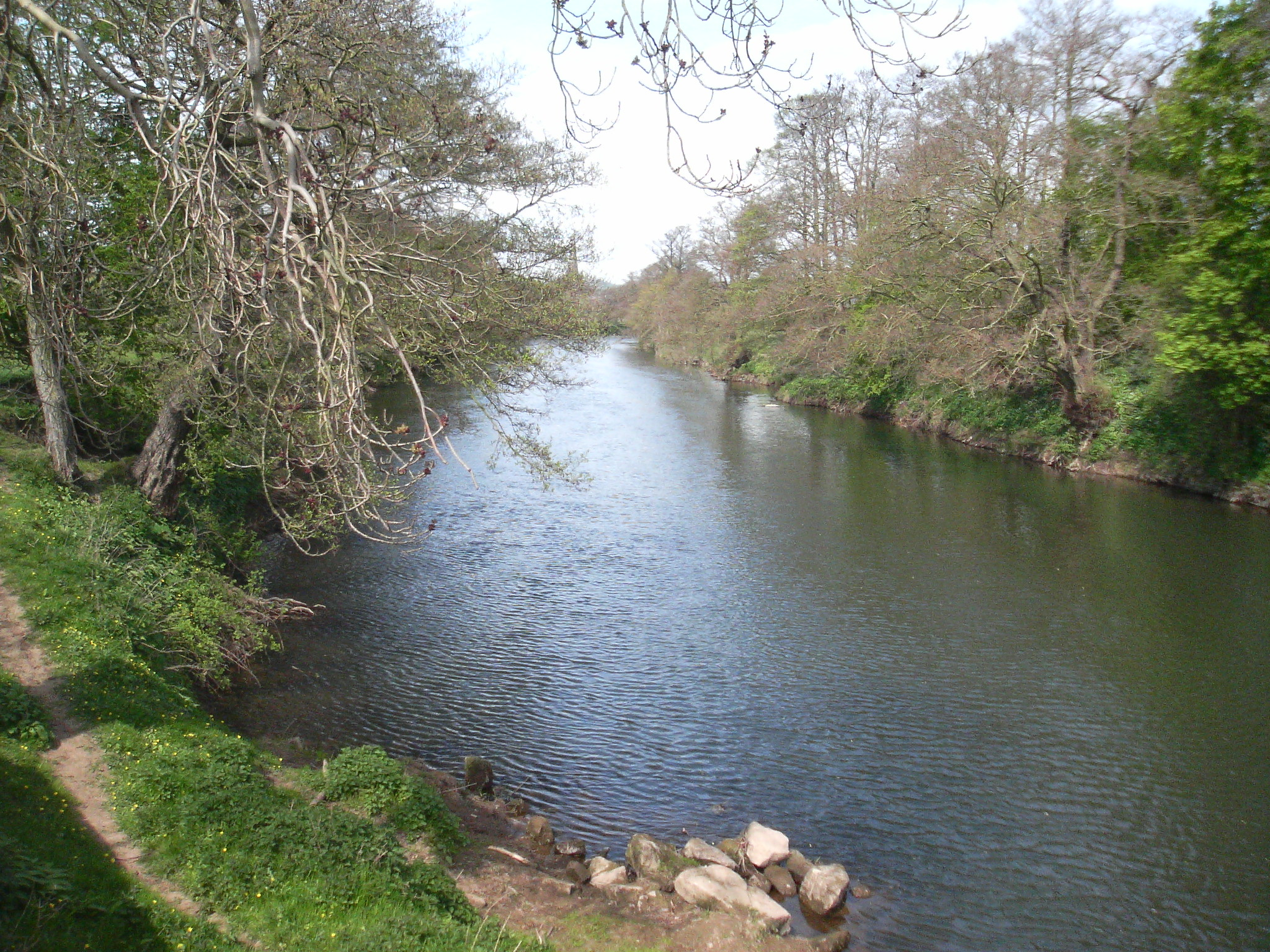
The Derwent near Duffield, where Kranich erected a watermill for his lead mining operations in 1554

Kranich's surname is spelled variously in extant documents; contemporary spellings include Cranye, Cranach, Cranicke, Cranegh, Craneigh, Craneighe, Craunighe and Kranyke. He is also referred to in some documents as 'Burchard', as though it were his surname, and later as 'Doctor Burcot'. He is said to have been born in southern Germany, and according to Bennell his surname suggests that he came from Kronach in upper Franconia near the Ore Mountains, a mining area.

He came to England during the reign of Mary I, and is first heard of in the State Papers on 3 June 1553 ('The suit of Burghard touching the mines'). According to Wallis he was perhaps a Catholic attempting to avoid the vicissitudes of the Protestant Reformation on the continent. On 29 May 1554 he was given licence for twenty years to 'mine, break open ground, melt, divide (i.e. separate metals) and search for all manner of metals' in accordance with an indenture which he had entered into on 18 May of that year. The grant included a prohibition preventing others from making use of his methods for a six-year period.

He initially worked at Makeney in Derbyshire, where he erected a watermill on the opposite bank to Milford, close to the current bridge, north of Duffield, and built a smeltmill, the first of its kind, to extract lead from ore obtained at Burrel Edge, that is Barrel Edge at Wirksworth, where the Godbehere lead vein runs below Black Rocks and Barrel Edge, close to the Roman road which runs from Wirksworth to Milford via the Chevin. Depositions taken in 1582 state that he left Derbyshire in 1554, having heard of better mining opportunities in Cornwall and Devon.

In Cornwall he rented the former Benedictine priory of St Cyric and St Juliett near St Veep, and at a cost of £300 converted a 14th-century flour mill at nearby Lerryn to a smelting house for silver-bearing ore. To finance the enterprise he was granted a loan by the Duchy of Cornwall. In 1557 John Trelawny, John Tredeneck and Thomas Treffry were directed to take charge of the mines Kranich had discovered, and the Duchy of Cornwall advanced a loan of £600 to finance the enterprise. Although considerable lead was produced, the anticipated production of copper and silver did not materialise. The lead was sent to Treffry, who died in 1563, at which time it passed into the hands of his son, John, who refused to deliver it to Carnsew and Tredeneck, who had taken over the mines and were responsible for repayment of the loan. The outcome of a Chancery suit for recovery of the lead is not known. At some point Kranich is said to have been arrested for debt, and imprisoned in the Marshalsea in London, perhaps in connection with this loan.

During his years in Cornwall, Lewis credits Kranich with introducing useful innovations at Sir Francis Godolphin's tin works, among them the hydraulic stamp mill and improved methods of dressing ore, as well as the use of charcoal as fuel for smelting instead of the traditional peat. However Lewis also allows for the possibility that these innovations should be credited to Daniel Hoechstetter. Richard Carew, on the other hand, mentions the 'rubble of certain mines and remains of a fining house' which demonstrate Kranich's 'vain endeavour in seeking of silver ore' in Cornwall. After Kranich had left Cornwall, a 16-page memorandum was prepared by William Carnsew 'relating to silver and lead mines in Cornwall and activities of Dr Burchard Kranich' in response to a request for information about the potential profitability of the mines from Piers Edgcumbe of Cotehele. Among the matters covered in the memorandum were 'the many disputes and arguments Kranich had with his sponsors'. According to Wallis, Kranich's mining enterprises in the West Country were ultimately a failure, and he moved to London.

On 14 June 1561 Kranich was granted denization by Elizabeth I. In London he practised medicine, and became known as 'Dr Burcot'. His abilities as a physician were well thought of by some, including John Somers, who wrote from court to Sir Nicholas Throckmorton on 29 August 1562 that 'My Lady Marquis' was seriously ill with jaundice, and that although some physicians had despaired of her, 'Burcot, the Dutchman, at a pinch is like to do some good if he may be suffered'.

In October 1562 the Queen was stricken with smallpox, and several modern sources state that she was cured by Kranich. The story runs that Kranich was summoned when the Queen first fell ill on 10 October. Kranich diagnosed smallpox, whereupon she 'dismissed him as a fool'. However, by 16 October she was so grievously ill that she lapsed into unconsciousness, giving rise to alarmed talk among her councillors of the succession. Henry Carey, 1st Baron Hunsdon, is said to have forced Kranich, 'some said at the point of a dagger', to resume his treatment of the Queen. Kranich ordered that she be given a potion he had devised, and be wrapped in red flannel and placed close to the fire. Within two hours the Queen is said to have regained consciousness. According to Foot, she rewarded Kranich with a grant which was stopped by Sir William Cecil; however other sources note that in 1562 he was given 100 marks. Doubt has been cast on this story, however. Bennell terms the tale that Hundson threatened Kranich with a dagger 'a later invention', and Brooks notes that the ultimate source of the story of Kranich's cure of the Queen is the memoirs of Sir Richard Carew, son of the author of The Survey of Cornwall (1602). Carew, writing after 1628, recalled a dinner at his father's home in 1601 or thereabouts at which his father and three other kinsmen of his recounted stories about Kranich, including his treatment of the Queen's smallpox. But Erickson notes that there are 'major discrepancies' between Carew's account, written decades after the fact, and the Spanish ambassador De Quadra's dispatches at the time; she concludes that while it is possible that Burcot treated the Queen for smallpox, Carew's narrative cannot be accepted as accurate.

John Nettleton also recorded that Kranich was sent by the Queen to treat Elizabeth Plantagenet (d.1569), the daughter of Arthur Plantagenet, 1st Viscount Lisle, in her final illness.

Kranich is said to have collaborated with Christopher Schutz in developing the use of calamine lotion in the treatment of burns from the furnaces used in smelting.

On 22 June 1563 he was given license for twenty years to make engines 'for the draining of waters' according to a new design he had lately perfected. His licence was similar to an earlier grant to John Medley, but Kranich was given additional powers involving drainage in old and abandoned mines.

== Final years ==
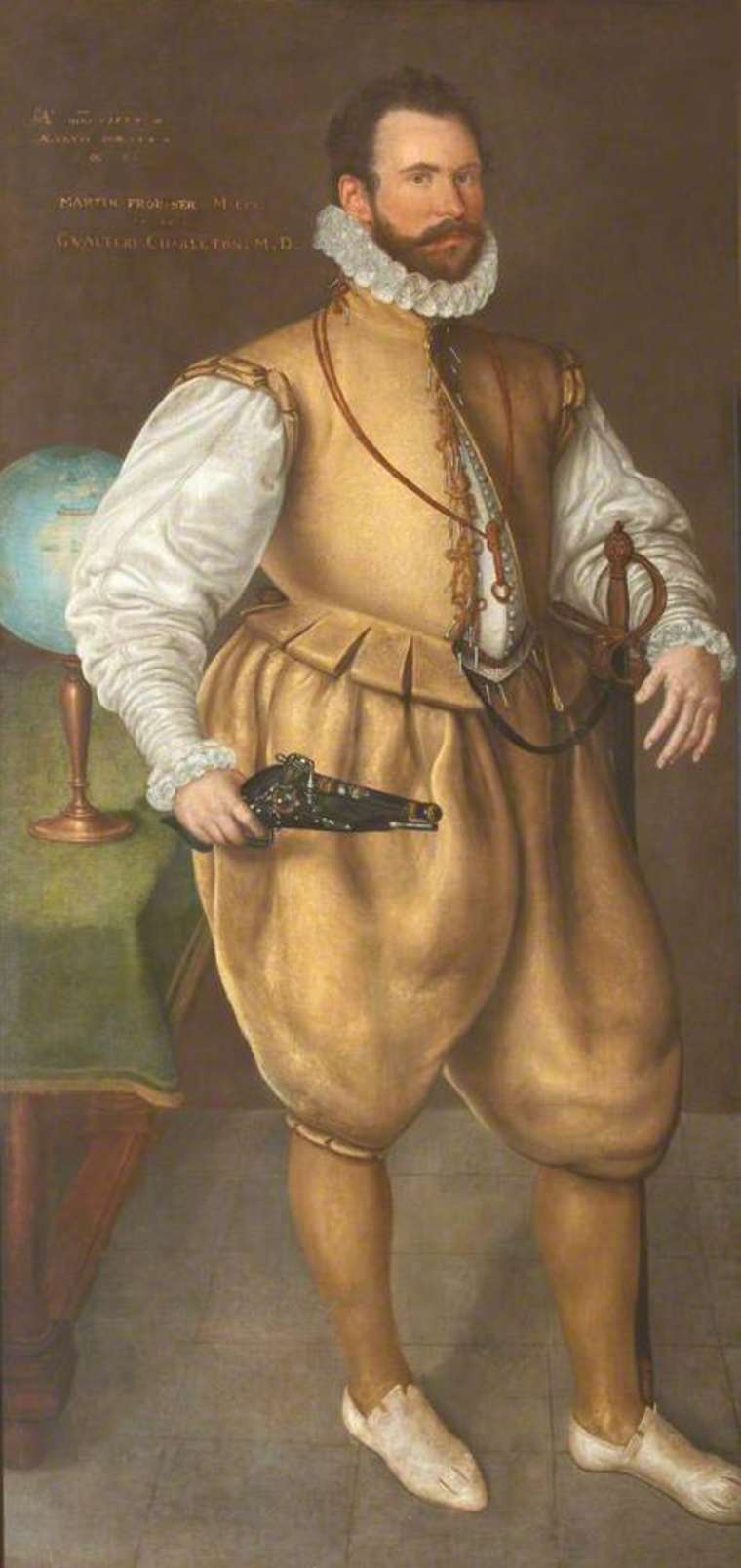
Martin Frobisher, who is said to have favoured Kranich

In 1573 Richard Eden, in the course of requesting licence from the Queen to 'compound the admirable medicaments of Paracelsus from metals and minerals', cited a certain 'Brocardus' as one of a number of foreigners permitted to do so. According to Campbell, 'Brocardus' is a Latinized form of the name 'Burchard', and Eden's petition is therefore evidence that Kranich was engaged in alchemy in England at the time.

In 1577 Kranich was involved in assaying the tons of black ore brought from Baffin Island during Sir Martin Frobisher's voyages to the Canadian Arctic in search of the Northwest Passage. Between 1 November 1577 and 6 March 1578 another German metallurgist working in England, Christopher Schutz, performed three 'great proofes' of the ore. Kranich and a Venetian metallurgist working in England, Giovanni Battista Agnello, were also brought in to assay the ore. Kranich and Schutz were soon at odds, with Schutz accusing Kranich, who was favoured by Martin Frobisher, of 'evil manners and ignorance'. Numerous documents survive showing Kranich's involvement in the assaying of the ore, including a letter of 26 November 1577 in which Kranich reported to Sir Francis Walsingham on the amount of gold found in his tests. Amid growing doubts about the value of the ore, Kranich insisted that it contained a significant amount of gold, and asked for £200 and a daily wage of £1 to refine it. He also designed a furnace for smelting the ore. However the ore eventually turned out to be worthless iron pyrite, and it was later alleged by Robert Denham, who had assisted Kranich with his tests, that Kranich had added gold and silver coins of his own to bring the projected value of the refined ore to £50 per ton. The story that Kranich allegedly doctored the assay tests is found in a deposition to the Privy Council by Michael Lok, one of the principal proponents of the Frobisher expeditions; in the deposition Lok claims that the evidence of Kranich's fraud was presented to Lord Burghley at his house in the Strand in the presence of Lok, Sir Walter Mildmay, and all the Commissioners involved in supervising the Frobisher expeditions.

Although his reputation suffered, Kranich nonetheless appears to have survived the Frobisher debacle relatively unscathed. However investors, including a number of prominent courtiers, lost £20,000, and the lawsuits which followed ruined Michael Lok.

In 1578 he is said to have been included in a list of Papists.

Kranich made his will on 7 October 1578. The chief beneficiary was his wife, Agnes, who was to have his house in St Clement's churchyard near Temple Bar, London, and, after payment of his just debts, the proceeds of the sale of his lands and tenements in Holborn in the parish of St Giles in the Fields, as well as the residue of his goods and chattels after the payment of legacies to the poor and to his servants. By a codicil dated 19 October he bequeathed to one of his servants, William Deane, any proceeds in excess of £700 received from the sale of his lands in Holborn as well as his medical books and instruments. A silver bowl which had been given him by 'my Lord', went to another servant.

He was buried at St Clement Danes on 22 October 1578. On 21 November 1578 probate was granted to his sole executrix, his widow Agnes.

== Marriage and issue ==
He married a wife named Agnes, about whom nothing further is known, by whom he had a daughter, Susan, who was buried at St Clement Danes on 20 September 1578. According to William Fleetwood, his daughter's death hastened Kranich's own end.

== Allusions to Kranich in Elizabethan and Jacobean literature ==
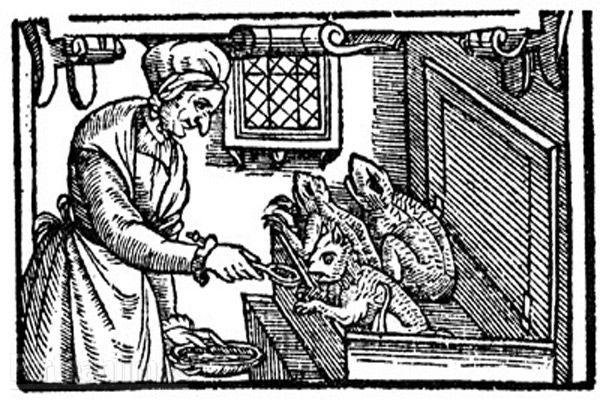
Contemporary depiction of a witch feeding her familiars

Kranich is alluded to, both favourably and unfavourably, in published works by several Elizabethan and Jacobean authors. He is satirised under the anagram 'Dr Tocrub' in the 1573 and 1578 editions of William Bullein's A Dialogue Against the Fever Pestilence, although there is no Dr Tocrub in the original edition of 1564.

In The Discoverie of Witchcraft (1584), Reginald Scot disparagingly described Kranich's purchase, for monetary gain, of a familiar spirit from a juggler and conjurer called Feats:

And though Saul were bewitched and blinded in the matter, yet doubtless a wise man would have perchance espied her knavery. Methinks Saul was brought to this witch (i.e. the Witch of Endor) much after the manner that Doctor Burcot was brought to Feats, who sold Master Doctor a familiar, whereby he thought to have wrought miracles, or rather to have gained good store of money.

Gabriel Harvey was also critical of Kranich. In a marginal note in his copy of Georg Meier's In Iudaeorum Medicastrorum Calumnias (1570), he compared Kranich to the Queen's physician, Doctor Lopez, whom he termed 'none of the learnedest or expertest physicians in the court, but one that maketh as great account of himself as the best'. Harvey added: 'Doctor Burcot was in a manner such another; who so bold as blind Bayard?'.

In Kind-Heart's Dream (1593) Henry Chettle featured Dr Burcot ('though a stranger, yet in England for physic famous') as one of the five apparitions who appear to him in his dream.

Thomas Nashe also alluded to Kranich in the dedicatory epistle of Have With You To Saffron Walden (1596):

Memorandum, I frame my whole book in the nature of a dialogue, much like Bullen and his Doctor Tocrub.

Thomas Deloney referred to him in his epistle to the readers in the second part of The Gentle Craft:

Notwithstanding, if you find yourself overcharged with melancholy, you may perhaps have here a fit medicine to purge that humour by conferring in this place with Doctor Burket.

Gervase Markham considered Kranich an excellent physician, and in the 1631 edition of The English Housewife specifically mentioned 'Dr Burket and Dr Bomelius' as a source for the prescriptions in his first chapter, stating that they had given a manuscript containing the remedies to 'a great worthy Countess of this land'. According to Best, however, there is no evidence that either Kranich or Bomelius contributed to the manuscript upon which Markham relied for his prescriptions.
