= Court of Exchequer Chamber =

English appellate court abolished in 1875

Error From Queen's Bench Act 1584
- Act of Parliament
- Parliament of England
- Long title: An Act for redress of erroneous judgments in the court, commonly called, the King's bench.
- Citation: 27 Eliz. 1. c. 8
- Territorial extent: England and Wales

Dates
- Royal assent: 14 September 1585
- Commencement: 23 November 1584 (Note: Start of session.)
- Repealed: 28 July 1863
Other legislation
Repealed by	Statute Law Revision Act 1863

Status: Repealed

Text of statute as originally enacted

English common law courts before 1830

The Court of Exchequer Chamber was an English appellate court for common law civil actions before the reforms of the Judicature Acts of 1873–1875. It originated in the fourteenth century, established in its final form by the Error From Queen's Bench Act 1584 (27 Eliz. 1. c. 8).

The court heard references from the King's Bench, the Court of Exchequer and, from 1830, directly rather than indirectly from the Court of Common Pleas. It was constituted of four judges belonging to the two courts that had been uninvolved at first instance. In cases of exceptional importance such as the Case of Mines (1568) and R v Hampden (1637) twelve common law judges, four from each division below, sitting in Exchequer Chamber, might be asked to determine a point of law, the matter being referred by the court hearing the case rather than the parties.

Though further appeal to the House of Lords was possible, this was rare before the nineteenth century. As a rule, a judgment of the Exchequer Chamber was considered the definitive statement of the law. Certain judgments like Hampden (the case of ship money) caused political controversy.

It was superseded by the Court of Appeal of England and Wales.

== Bibliography ==
- Baker, J. H. (2002). An Introduction to English Legal History (4th ed.). London: Butterworths. pp. 137–138. ISBN 0-406-93053-8.
- Cornish, W.; Clarke, G. (1989). Law and Society in England 1750-1950. London: Sweet & Maxwell. p. 25. ISBN 0421311509.
