= Cosslett (surname) =

Cosslett is a surname, and may refer to:

- Andy Cosslett (born 1955), British businessman, chairman of ITV
- Rhiannon Lucy Cosslett, British journalist and writer
- Vernon Ellis Cosslett (1908–1990), British microscopist
- Scott Cosslett (born 2003), New Zealand field hockey player

== See also ==
- Coslett
