= Jackson Island (Nunavut) =

Island in Qikiqtaaluk Region, Nunavut, Canada

- Location within Nunavut Location within Canada

Geography
- Location: Labrador Sea
- Coordinates: 64°33′N 65°10′W
- Archipelago: Arctic Archipelago

Administration
- Canada
- Nunavut: Nunavut
- Region: Qikiqtaaluk

Demographics
- Population: Uninhabited

Jackson Island is an irregularly shaped offshore island located near Baffin Island in the Arctic Archipelago, in Nunavut's Qikiqtaaluk Region.

== Geography ==
The uninhabited island lies in the Labrador Sea, at the mouth of Neptune Bay, off the east coast of Hall Peninsula's Finger Land. Christopher Hall Island is to the southeast, while Moodie Island is to the northwest.

== See also ==
- List of Canadian Arctic islands
