= Osmond process =

Iron refining method of the late Middle Ages

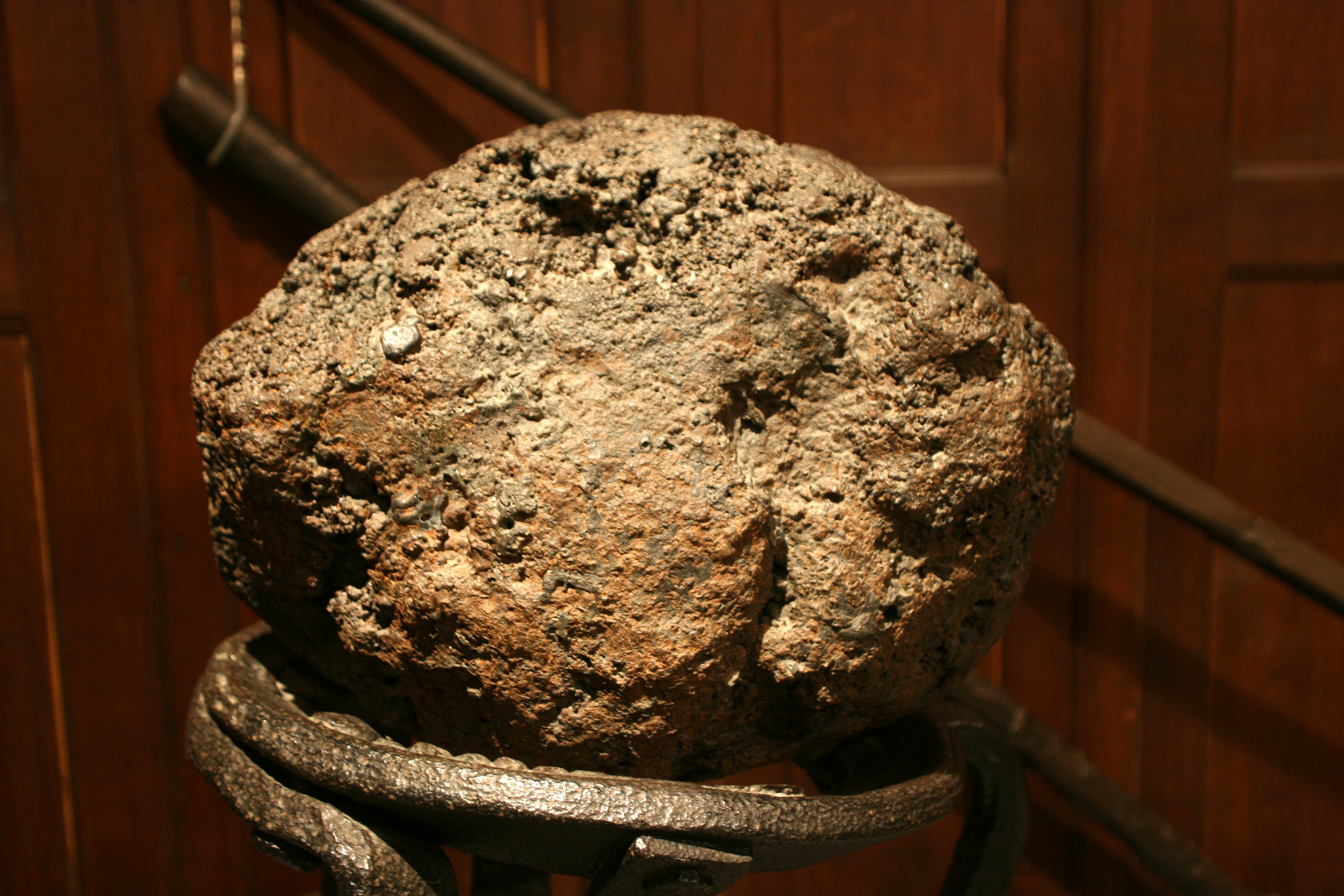
An osmond

Principle of the osmond finery hearth

Osmond iron (also spelt osmund and also called osborn) was wrought iron made by a particular process. This is associated with the first European production of cast iron in furnaces such as Lapphyttan in Sweden.

Osmonds appear in some of the earliest English Customs accounts, for example in 1325. The kappe was a Swedish weight used for osmond which occurs in a commercial treaty in Novgorod in 1203, and this implies the production of osmond iron.

Osmond iron was made by melting pig iron in a hearth that is narrower and deeper than a typical finery in an English finery forge. The hearth had a charcoal fire blown with bellows through a tuyere. As the iron melted, the drops fell through the blast and congealed. They were then lifted with an iron bar into the blast. As they melted they were caught on the end of a large staff, held in the fire and turned rapidly so that the drops spread out, forming a ball.

Osmonds reached England during the later Middle Ages through the port of Gdańsk. However, there were hammer mills in its hinterland and that of Lübeck, which made the osmonds into bar iron. In the 1620s, Gustav II Adolf of Sweden prohibited his subjects from exporting unfinished iron, and all trade in osmonds ceased.

The osmond process was also used in the county of Mark in Westphalia, in southern Germany and Switzerland.

The process was introduced to Wales in connection with the establishment by William Humfrey and others of wireworks at Tintern in 1566, an enterprise that was shortly afterwards taken over by the Company of Mineral and Battery Works. Humfrey arranged to bring an expert maker of Osmond iron, Corslett Tinkhaus, from southwest Westphalia, where the production had reached a high level of technical proficiency. Tinkhaus arrived in Wales in 1567 and began working at Rhydygwern in the Glamorgan part of the lordship of Machen. This was where the first Machen Forge was, and he was evidently making osmond iron there. The iron was apparently forged with a tilt hammer, rather than the helve hammer, usual in finery forges. This was the raw material for the wireworks at Tintern. Osmond iron was made at Pontypool in the 18th century to supply wireworks there, and one of the forges there was still called the 'Osborn Forge' in the 19th century.
