= Hozier Islands =

Group of islands in Nunavut, Canada

- Location within Nunavut Location within Canada

Geography
- Location: Labrador Sea
- Coordinates: 64°7′N 64°35′W
- Archipelago: Arctic Archipelago

Administration
- Canada
- Nunavut: Nunavut
- Region: Qikiqtaaluk

Demographics
- Population: Uninhabited

The Hozier Islands are a Baffin Island offshore island group located in the Arctic Archipelago in the territory of Nunavut's Qikiqtaaluk Region. The uninhabited island group lies in the Labrador Sea, east of Hall Peninsula. The Leybourne Islands are 5 km (3.1 mi) to the north. The largest of the Hozier Islands is about 5 miles (8.0 km) long.
