= Leybourne Islands =

Group of islands in Nunavut, Canada

- Location within Nunavut Location within Canada

Geography
- Location: Labrador Sea
- Coordinates: 64°15′N 64°40′W
- Archipelago: Arctic Archipelago

Administration
- Canada
- Nunavut: Nunavut
- Region: Qikiqtaaluk

Demographics
- Population: Uninhabited

The Leybourne Islands are a Baffin Island offshore island group located in the Arctic Archipelago in the territory of Nunavut's Qikiqtaaluk Region. The island group lies in the Labrador Sea at the entrance of Popham Bay, off the east coast of Hall Peninsula. The Hozier Islands are 5 km (3.1 mi) to the south, while Christopher Hall Island is to the north.
