= Milford Hydro =

- Country: United Kingdom
- Location: Milford, Derbyshire, United Kingdom
- Coordinates: 53°00′7″N 1°28′46.3″W
- Commission date: 1908

Thermal power station
- Turbine technology: Hydroelectric

Power generation
- Nameplate capacity: 150 kW

Milford Hydro is the name given to a hydro-electric power plant built on the River Derwent in Milford, Derbyshire.

The original electrical power plant was installed between 1907 and 1908 by John McDonald and Company of the Bridge Turbine Works, Pollockshaws to power the English Sewing Cotton Company works at Milford Mills. The previous water wheels were replaced by two turbines described as centre discharge horizontal Achilles of the American pattern which each generated 340 h.p. They operated off a 14 feet (4.3 m) fall of water and were of double wheel type with a diameter of 42 inches (1.1 m). Each turbine discharged 16,000 cubic feet (450 m^{3}) of water per minute. The first turbine provided power for the operation of mill machinery, and the second turbine was used for lighting. The total cost of the works was £5,500 (equivalent to £572,000 in 2025).

The power plant was refurbished by Derwent Hydro in 2020 with a new turbine of the same capacity as the old one.
