= Miner's licence =

The miner's licence was the colonial government's response to the need to provide infrastructure including policing during the Australian gold rushes. The first Australian mining laws were enacted in 1851. A proclamation by Governor Charles Fitzroy of New South Wales, on 22 May 1851 asserted the Crown's right to all gold discovered in New South Wales. Governor Fitzroy invoked the "Case of Mines" (R v Earl of Northumberland) of 1567, which confirmed the Crown's prerogative right to all gold and silver found in the Crown's realm. Victoria separated from New South Wales on 1 July 1851, and the Victorian Lieutenant-Governor Charles La Trobe issued a similar proclamation on 16 August 1851. In January 1852, Victoria enacted the Mining Act 1852 (repealed) supplemented by the Mining Act 1853 (repealed). Before that, ownership of minerals and petroleum passed to those who were granted title to land by the colonial governors according to common law concepts, except the right to "Royal Mines" (the precious metals of gold and silver) which remained vested in the Crown by virtue of royal prerogative.
