= Christopher Schutz =

German-born English metallurgist (1521–1592)

Christopher Schutz (1521–1592) also commonly known in England as Jonas Schutz, was a German-born metallurgist who worked in England for several decades. He built England's first blast furnace at Tintern, and was one of the principal assayers of the worthless ore brought from Baffin Island by Sir Martin Frobisher.

== Early career ==
Christopher Schutz, born in Annaberg, Saxony, was the son of Christoph Schutz (born 1505) of Chemnitz. His mother's name is unknown. He learned his craft in mines in the Ore Mountains. About 1563 he received an invitation to work in England. William Humfrey (died 1579), who had been appointed Assay Master at the Royal Mint in 1561, needed someone knowledgeable about calamine ore, used in the production of latten and brass, and paid Schutz' way to England. In 1564 Schutz, aided by twenty German-speaking workers, built England's first blast furnace at Tintern. In a letter of 16 August 1565 to Sir William Cecil, Humfrey stated that Schutz was 'bound in £10,000 to communicate his art in working metals', and requested that he and Schutz be granted a joint patent. In September 1565 Humfrey and Schutz were granted licences to prospect for calamine in England and in the Pale in Ireland, and to mine and process the ore, being joined in some of their licences with Thomas Smythe, William Williams and Humfrey Cole. Only a few months later, in early 1566, William Humfrey and Schutz found calamine in the Mendip Hills, and Daniel Hoechstetter designed a refining process by which it could be used in Schutz' furnace at Tintern.

As a reward for his work at Tintern, Schutz was granted denization on 9 April 1568, but the extraction of calamine ore at Worle Hill proved prohibitively expensive for the production of brass, and on 28 May the Company of Mineral and Battery Works, a newly incorporated joint stock company in which both Humfrey and Schutz held shares together with many influential members of the English court and government, took over the operation of the furnace, and converted it to the production of iron wire. A by-product of Schutz' first venture was the use of calamine lotion in the treatment of burns from furnaces, which Schutz developed with Burchard Kranich, another German-born metallurgist and one of the Queen's physicians.

Schutz' expertise was made use of by the Company of Mineral and Battery Works over the next decade in the design of a steel furnace at Robertsbridge, Sussex, and smelters at Beauchief Abbey near Sheffield, Bristol, Nottingham, London and elsewhere. The company is said to have employed 8,000 workers at this time.

== Frobisher voyages ==
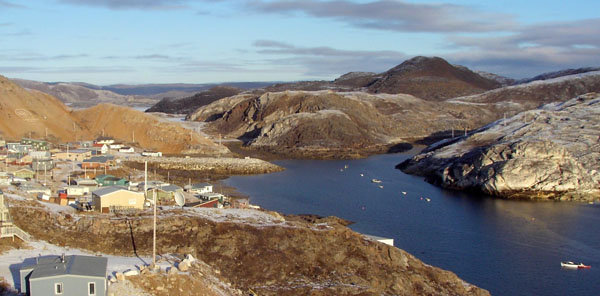
Modern-day Kimmirut, in the area known to Schutz as Meta Incognita

Schutz' next venture, however, was a financial disaster. In January 1577 Schutz assisted Giovanni Battista Agnello, a Venetian then living in London, in the assaying of a black stone which had been picked up lying loose on the surface of Hall's Island by Robert Garrard during Sir Martin Frobisher's first voyage to the Canadian Arctic in search of the Northwest Passage. Agnello's claim that the stone was gold-bearing (apparently confirmed or at least accepted by Schutz) caused government officials to authorise a second voyage by Frobisher to Baffin Island. Schutz accompanied Frobisher's ships to Meta Incognita, where he is said to have found a 'great ruby stone' which Frobisher promised to present to the Queen in Schutz's name, but which was apparently not heard of again after it came into Frobisher's hands. In August 1577 Schutz, Robert Denham and Gregory Bona, in a brick-lined furnace built for the purpose, assayed black ore mine at the Countess of Warwick's Island, (now Kodlunarn Island) in Frobisher Bay. Back in England, between 1 November 1577 and 6 March 1578 Schutz performed three 'great proofes' of the black ore brought back from this second voyage. Agnello and Kranich were also brought in to assay the ore, and Kranich and Schutz were soon at odds, with Schutz accusing Kranich, who was favoured by Frobisher, of 'evil manners and ignorance'. It was later alleged by Robert Denham, who had assisted Kranich with his tests, that Kranich had added gold and silver coins of his own to bring the projected value of the refined ore to £50 per ton.

Schutz' tests were conducted in a small furnace in the garden of the London residence at Tower Hill of Sir William Wynter, the Queen's Master of the Naval Ordnance. The second of these tests, completed on 6 December 1577, found that the ore contained £40 worth of gold and silver per ton. Although this result fell short of Frobisher's claim that the ore would yield £60 worth of gold per ton, government officials were sufficiently impressed to authorise a third voyage to Baffin Island to secure 2000 additional tons of ore. The results from Schutz' third test, completed on 6 March 1578, were even less promising: the refined ore was projected to yield only £23 15s worth of gold and silver per ton. Nonetheless, Frobisher's third voyage went ahead, and a smelter was built at Dartford under Schutz' direction at a cost of £583.

Schutz made further tests at Dartford of a ton of ore on 29 December 1578, and a half ton of ore on 20 January 1579. The latter test yielded a value of only £10 per ton, causing suspicion to fall on Schutz, Denham, Frobisher and Michael Lok, a major promoter of the Frobisher voyages. The Commissioners appointed to supervise the voyages then ordered Schutz to perform a further test in their presence at Tower Hill, which he did on 22 March 1579. This time he obtained results of £15 a ton, which appeared to satisfy the Commissioners. Seeing his reputation being thus brought into discredit Schutz offered, in partnership with Robert Denham, to buy the entire 1300 tons of ore at Dartford at 20 marks a ton, and to refine it at their own cost; their offer was delivered by Lok to Lord Burghley and Sir Francis Walsingham on 18 April 1579, along with a separate offer from Lok himself for 150 tons of the ore. The Privy Council was at first inclined to accept the offer; however Frobisher insinuated that Lok and Schutz were fraudulently trying to get valuable ore worth £40 a ton into their own hands, and Sir Thomas Gresham and the other Commissioners, influenced by Frobisher, then termed it a disgrace to the Queen to sell it.

The work at Dartford thus came to a halt. In a report in 1581 Schutz' design for the Dartford furnace was blamed, but recent modern research has shown that the real problem was that the 1400 tonnes of ore brought back to England from Baffin Island were not gold-bearing. Hogarth concluded that since Schutz had attempted to buy all the ore himself, he was unlikely to have tampered with the tests, and the 'inescapable conclusion' is that the assay method was at fault, perhaps because of contamination from additives necessarily used in the process. McDermott also notes that Schutz' original test while he was on Countess of Warwick Island had been on a 'rich red ore' from Jonas' Mount, but little of that ore was brought back on the 1577 voyage because the ships were already laden with black ore before the red ore was found, and Frobisher did not mine at Jonas' Mount on the 1578 voyage. Moreover, the original black stone had been found by Garrard on Hall's Island during the 1576 voyage, and according to Michael Lok's account, no ore was discovered during a search of Hall's Island on the second voyage of 1577, and Frobisher 'never after brought home one stone more of that rich ore which he brought in the first voyage, for there was none of it to be found'.

== Later years ==
Little is known of Schutz' last years. He appears to have survived the Frobisher debacle relatively unscathed, although investors, including a number of prominent courtiers, lost £20,000, and the lawsuits which followed ruined one of the scheme's principal proponents, Michael Lok. The Dartford furnace was eventually sold, and by 1586 had become England's first paper mill under the auspices of John Spilman. Schutz is said to have been employed by King James of Scotland as Master of the Works for Ores from Cathay and the North West Parts, and to have been replaced in that position by Act of the Scottish Parliament in 1593 by Bevis Bulmer.

Schutz' date of death is not known. He owned a house in London in St Giles Cripplegate, and in his will dated 8 February 1574 requested burial in that parish. His will was not proved until 8 June 1592. In it he left nothing to his wife (thought to have been named Orothea). Apart from a few bequests, including £100 left to his brother, Balthazar, his estate went to his executor, Francis Barty (or Berty) (d. 5 June 1611), a native of Antwerp of Florentine parentage who married Katherine Leake, the daughter of the Southwark brewer, Henry Leake (d.1559). Barty was one of the original shareholders in the Company of Mineral and Battery Works. The relationship between Shutz and his executor was a long-standing one: on 14 June 1566 Barty had sent a letter from Sluys to Sir William Cecil, recommending Schutz, who was 'coming to England to establish battery and wire works'.
