= Holly Bush Inn, Makeney =

Listed pub in Makeney, Derbyshire, England

Holly Bush Inn
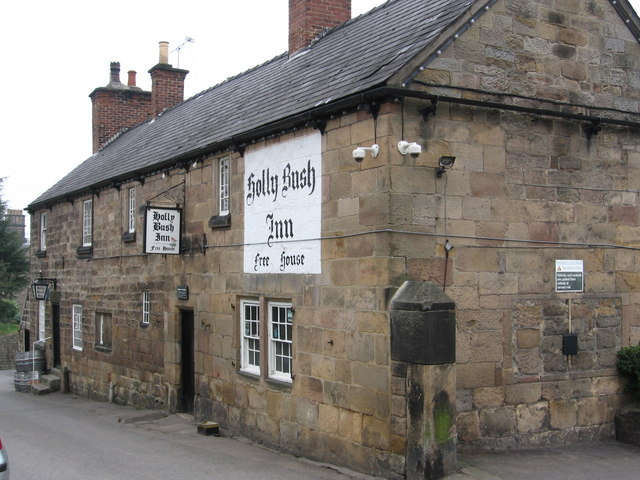
- The pub in 2009

- Location within Derbyshire

General information
- Type: Public house
- Location: Holly Bush Lane, Makeney, Derbyshire, England
- Coordinates: 52.998481°N 1.476793°W
- Year built: 17th or early 18th century
- Renovated: 1981 (expanded)
- Owner: Holly Bush Inn Makeney Ltd

Design and construction
- Designations

Listed Building – Grade II
- Official name: The Holly Bush Inn
- Designated: 13 December 1979
- Reference no.: 1335302

The Holly Bush Inn is a Grade II listed public house on Holly Bush Lane in Makeney, Derbyshire, England. Occupying a building dating from the 17th or early 18th century, it is recognised for its historic interior, which is included on CAMRA's National Inventory of Historic Pub Interiors and is rated three stars for "outstanding national historic importance". In 2025, the pub was ranked 17th in the European Bar Guide's list of the 100 best bars in Europe.

== History ==
The inn and the adjoining No. 2 Holly Bush Lane form a building dating from the 17th or early 18th century with later alterations. On 13 December 1979, the Holly Bush Inn and No. 2 were designated together as a Grade II listed building. In 1981, the cottage adjoining the pub to the left was acquired and converted to provide additional bar accommodation.

It was included on the Campaign for Real Ale (CAMRA)'s National Inventory of Historic Pub Interiors before the inventory's grading system was revised. Under the revised scheme, it is rated three stars and its interior is regarded as being "of outstanding national historic importance". The pub also retains the traditional practice of serving Marston's Pedigree from a jug kept behind the bar. In 2025, the Holly Bush Inn was ranked 17th in the European Bar Guide's list of the 100 best bars in Europe.

== Architecture ==
=== Exterior ===
The building is a long two-storey structure of stone construction facing the street, with a slate roof and four brick chimneys. The front elevation has four windows on the upper floor and five on the ground floor. Former stone-framed windows, now blocked or partly blocked, survive in the rear gable and on the front elevation. The windows include sashes and metal-framed casements with glazing bars. The entrance to No. 2 is approached by three stone steps.

=== Interior ===
The interior retains a notable snug formed by a curved partition incorporating glazed upper panels and a centrally placed double door. Benches attached to the partition create the effect of high-backed settles, a layout that survives in only a small number of pubs in the United Kingdom. The room also retains a quarry-tiled floor and historic fixed seating.

The principal bar contains an old bar counter, historic bar-back shelving, fixed seating and a stone fireplace. Other surviving features include a service passage to the rear of the servery and a former outside gents incorporated into a later conservatory-style extension.

== See also ==
- Listed buildings in Belper
