= Case of Mines =

1568 judgment in the United Kingdom

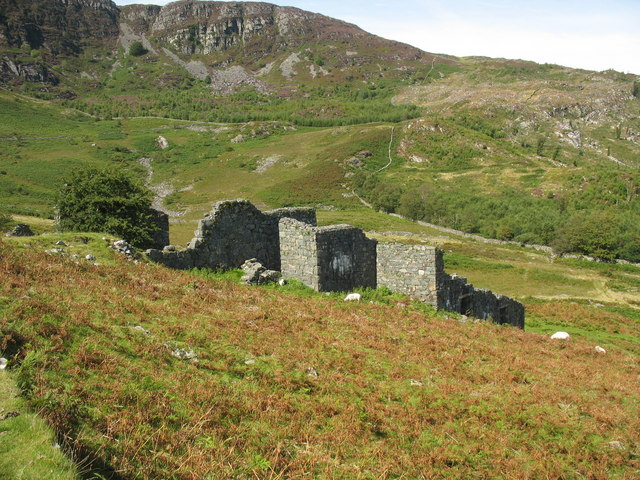
- Court: Court of Exchequer Chamber
- Full case name: Regina v Earl of Northumberland
- Decided: 1568
- Citations: (1568) 1 Plowden 310; 75 ER 472. Pettus, Fodinae Regales

Court membership
- Judge sitting: panel of 12 judges

Keywords
- Mineral rights, gold, silver

The Case of Mines or R v Earl of Northumberland was decided in 1568.

Rather than the usual four judges, a full panel of twelve common law senior judges, on appeal, decided "that by the law all mines of gold and silver within the realm, whether they be in the lands of the Queen, or of subjects, belong to the Queen by prerogative, with liberty to dig and carry away the ores thereof, and with other such incidents thereto as are necessary to be used for the getting of the ore."

The decision was in the law of England and Wales and was later confirmed by courts to be applicable in the monarch's other realms and dominions. The royalties payable by custom to the UK government have been passed by British statute to the former dominions early in their recognition as dominions.

== Facts ==
The Earl of Northumberland in 1568 was Thomas Percy, 7th Earl of Northumberland. The queen was Elizabeth I of England.

Some copper miners in Keswick found an admixture of gold in copper mined from lands belonging to the Earl of Northumberland. Due to concerns about revenue and the possibility of a renewed war with Spain, the Queen’s advisers were anxious to claim prerogative rights to the gold. A suit was brought in the Court of Exchequer Chamber and judgment was for the Queen founding the Crown’s right to mine gold or silver.

The challenge by the Earl of Northumberland was on the ground that the work was within the Royalties granted to his family in a former reign.

== Judgment ==
Twelve judges decided in favour of the queen,

that by the law all mines of gold and silver within the realm, whether they be in the lands of the Queen, or of subjects, belong to the Queen by prerogative, with liberty to dig and carry away the ores thereof, and with other such incidents thereto as are necessary to be used for the getting of the ore.

The neglect of the earl and his predecessors to work the minerals during seventy years 'had made that questionable which for ages was out of question', and the prerogative was revoked.

This illustrates that in theory all gold and silver belongs to the queen, and that most authorities to extract minerals granted have a "use it, or lose it" component.

== Significance ==
On 28 May 1568 two mining monopolies were created, the Company of Mineral and Battery Works and the Society of Mines Royal. The effects of the decision were limited by the Royal Mines Act 1688 (1 Will. & Mar. c. 30), which removed the monopoly of these two companies.

=== Reporting of the case ===
One report featured in the later English Reports series. Plowden's extensive report was published some years after the judgment.

=== Subsequent cases ===
The case has remained the leading case in New Zealand law on the royal prerogative to the royal metals of gold and silver; by statute all related royalties flow to the government of New Zealand. The case was also the authority on which the controversial Miner's Licences in Australia were introduced at the time of the Australian gold rushes.

== See also ==
- Royalty
- Royal prerogative
- Welsh gold
- Silver mining
- Gold mining in Western Australia
- Waitangi Tribunal
