= Taccola =

Italian artist and engineer

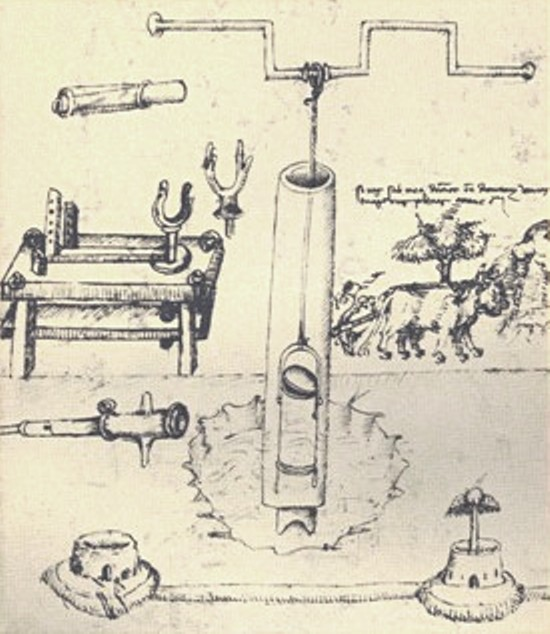
First European depiction of a piston pump, c.1450

Mariano di Jacopo (1382 – c. 1453), called Taccola ("the jackdaw"), was a Sienese polymath, administrator, artist and engineer of the early Italian Renaissance. His technological treatises De ingeneis and De machinis contain numerous annotated drawings of a wide array of innovative machines and devices. His work was widely studied and copied by later Renaissance engineers and artists, among them Francesco di Giorgio, and Leonardo da Vinci.

== Life and career ==
Mariano di Jacopo was born in Siena in 1382. Practically nothing is known of his early years of training or apprenticeship. As an adult, he pursued a varied career in Siena, working in such diverse jobs as notary, university secretary, sculptor, superintendent of roads and hydraulic engineer. In the 1440s, Taccola retired from his official positions, receiving a pension from the state. He is known to have joined the fraternal order of San Jacomo by 1453 and presumably died around that date.

== Work and style ==
Taccola left behind two treatises, the first being De ingeneis ('on engines'), work on its four books starting as early as 1419. Having been completed in 1433, Taccola continued to amend drawings and annotations to De ingeneis until about 1449. In the same year, Taccola published his second manuscript, De machinis ('on machines'), in which he restated many of the devices from the long development process of his first treatise.

Drawn with black ink on paper and accompanied by hand-written annotations, Taccola depicts in his work a multitude of 'ingenious devices' in hydraulic engineering, milling, construction and war machinery. His drawings show him to be a man of transition: while his subject matter is already that of later Renaissance artist-engineers, his method of representation owes much to medieval manuscript illustration. Notably, with perspective coming and going in his drawings, Taccola seemed to remain largely unaware of the ongoing revolution in perspective painting. This is the more curious, since he is the only man known to have interviewed the 'father of linear perspectivity' himself, Filippo Brunelleschi. Despite these graphic inconsistencies, Taccola's style has been described as being forceful, authentic and usually to be relied upon to capture the essential.

== Influence and rediscovery ==
The work of Taccola, named the 'Sienese Archimedes', stands at the beginning of the tradition of Italian Renaissance artist-engineers, with a growing interest in technological matters of all kinds. His drawings were copied and served as a source of inspiration by such as Buonacorso Ghiberti, Francesco di Giorgio, and perhaps even Leonardo da Vinci. Of special historical importance are his drawings of the ingenious lifting devices and reversible-gear systems which Brunelleschi devised for the construction of the dome of the Florence cathedral, at the time the second widest in the world.

Interest in Taccola's work, however, practically ceased some time after his death until the late twentieth century, one reason perhaps being that his treatises circulated only as hand-copied books, with at least three of them remaining extant today. His original manuscripts, whose style turned out to be more sophisticated than those of its copies, were rediscovered and identified in the state libraries of Munich and Florence in the 1960s, giving impetus for the first printed editions of both De ingeneis and De machinis in subsequent years.

== Gallery ==
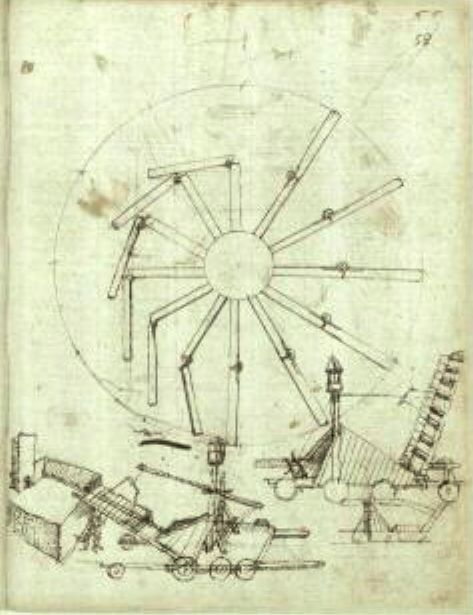
Overbalanced wheel and war machines

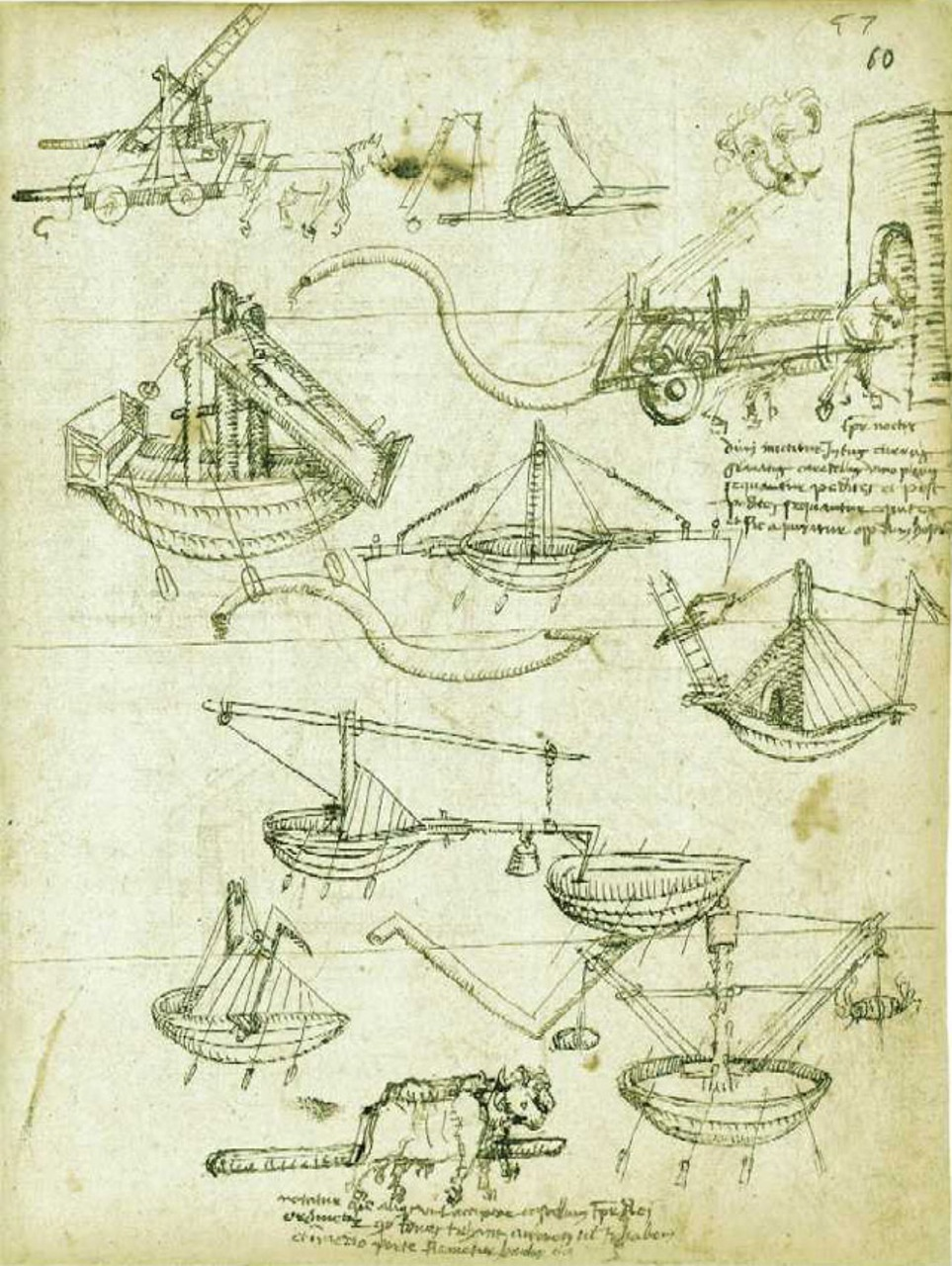
Machines, by Taccola, De ingeneis

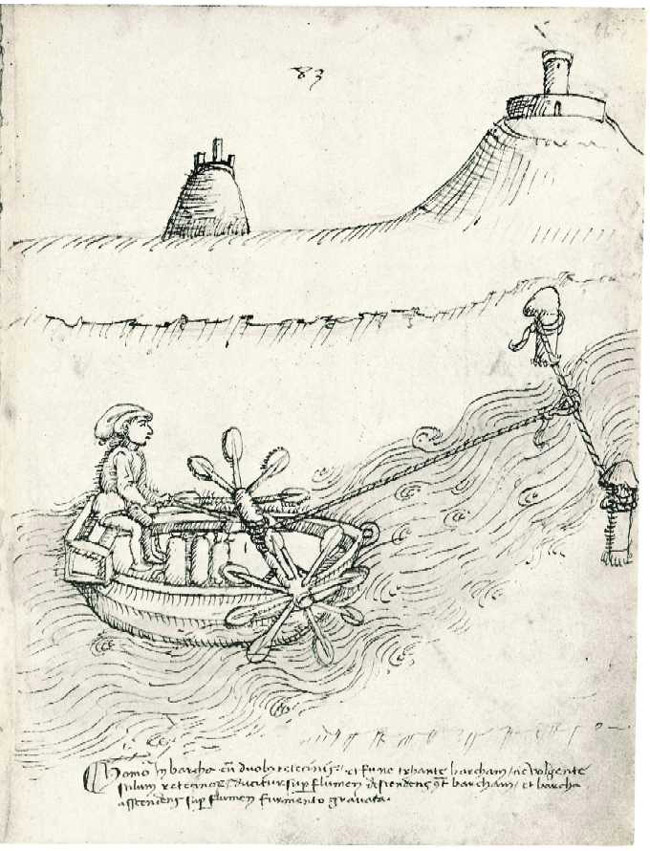
Paddle boat system, De machinis (1449)

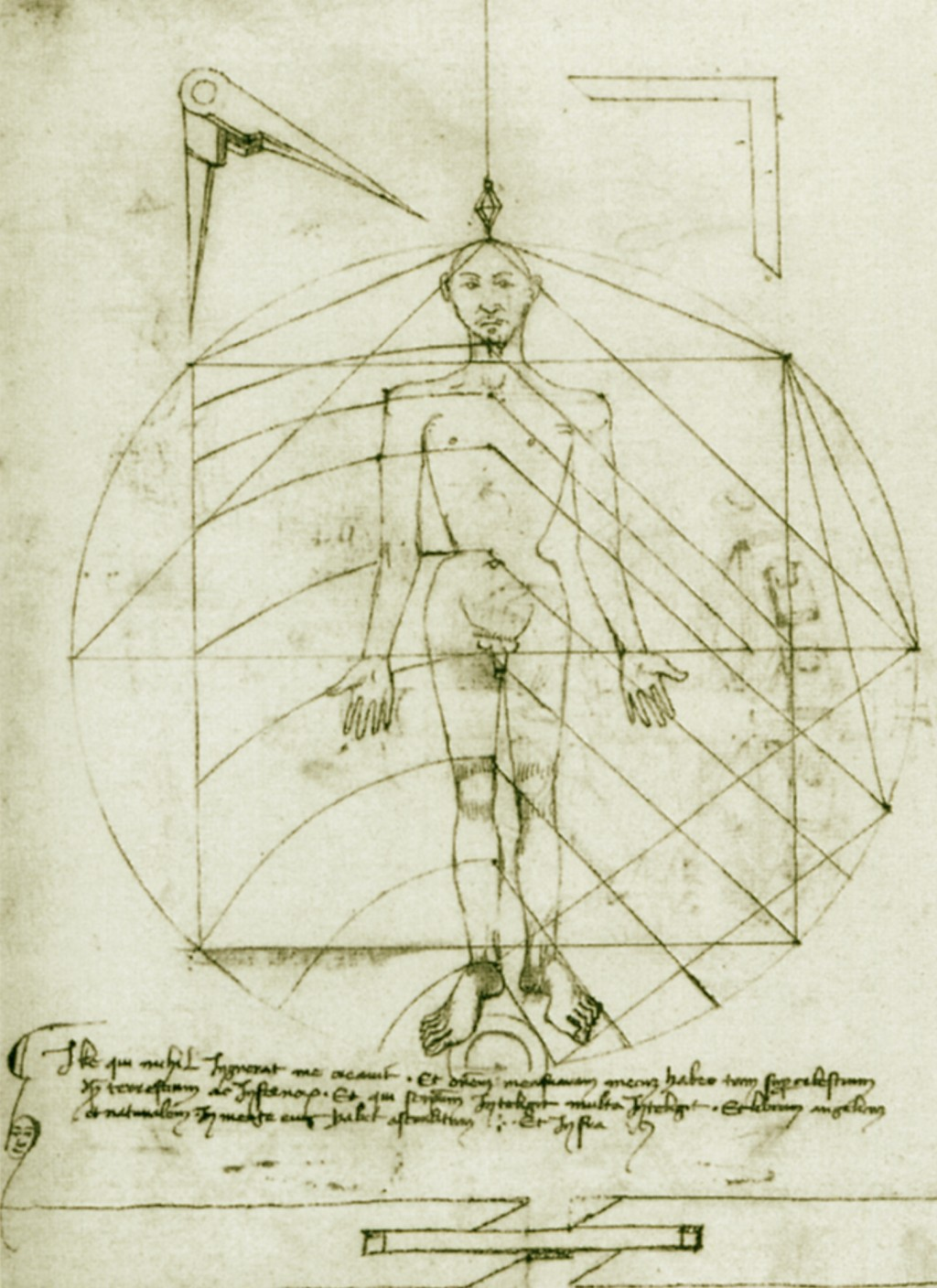
Taccola "Vitruvian man"

== Sources ==
- Beck, J.H., ed. (1969). Mariano di Jacopo detto il Taccola, 'Liber tertius de ingeneis ac edifitiis non usitatis'. Milan: dizioni il Polifilo. p. 156. "96 pls" (This edition reproduces Books III and IV of de Ingeneis)
- Prager, Frank D.; Scaglia, Gustina, eds. (1971). Mariano Taccola and His Book "De ingeneis". Cambridge, Mass.: M.I.T. Press. pp. 230 pp. "129 pls." (This edition also reproduces Books III and IV of de Ingeneis)
- Scaglia, Gustina, ed. (1971). Mariano Taccola, De machinis: The Engineering Treatise of 1449, 2 vols.. Wiesbaden: Dr. Ludwig Reichert Verlag. pp. 181 and 210. "200 pls."
- Fane, Lawrence (2003). The Invented World of Mariano Taccola", Leonardo. Vol. 36. pp. 135–143. "Taccola's drawings from the perspective of an artist"
- Shelby, Lon (1975). "Mariano Taccola and His Books on Engines and Machines". Technology and Culture. 16 (3): 466–475. doi:10.2307/3103042. JSTOR 3103042. "Review of Taccola's treatises and its three modern editions (see above facsimile editions)"
