= Moodie Island =

Island in Nunavut, Canada

- Location within Nunavut Location within Canada

Geography
- Location: Cumberland Sound
- Coordinates: 64°37′N 65°30′W
- Archipelago: Arctic Archipelago
- Area: 233 km^{2} (90 sq mi)

Administration
- Canada
- Nunavut: Nunavut
- Region: Qikiqtaaluk

Demographics
- Population: 0

Moodie Island is one of Baffin Island's small, uninhabited, offshore islands and is a part of the Arctic Archipelago within the territory of Nunavut. Located on the southern side of Cumberland Sound, it separates Littlecote Channel to the west from Neptune Bay to the east.

It has an area of 233 km^{2} (90 sq mi).

The island is extremely mountainous with a highest point of roughly 765 m.
