= Shuck Island =

River island of the Mississippi River, U.S.

Coordinates: 39°42′46″N 91°20′29″W

Shuck Island is a small island in the Mississippi River, located in Pike County, Illinois, opposite Hannibal, Missouri.
