= Pearl Island (Illinois) =

Coordinates: 39°42′23.3″N 91°20′4.2″W

Pearl Island, also known as Glasscock Island, is a river island in the Mississippi River. It is in Levee Township in Illinois. Formerly, it was considered part of Hannibal, Missouri. Nearby islands include Shuck Island and Tower Island. It is the setting for Jackson's Island in books by Mark Twain.
