= Christopher Hall Island =

Island in the Arctic Archipelago

- Location within Nunavut Location within Canada

Geography
- Location: Labrador Sea
- Coordinates: 64°29′N 65°01′W
- Archipelago: Arctic Archipelago

Administration
- Canada
- Territory: Nunavut
- Region: Qikiqtaaluk

Demographics
- Population: Uninhabited

Christopher Hall Island is an uninhabited island off the coast of Baffin Island in the Arctic Archipelago in Nunavut's Qikiqtaaluk Region. The island lies in the Davis Strait between Popham Bay and Neptune Bay, off the east coast of Hall Peninsula's Finger Land. The Leybourne Islands are to the south, while Jackson Island is to the north.
