= Bole hill =

Place where lead was formerly smelted

A bole hill (also spelt bail hill) was a place where lead was formerly smelted in the open air. The bole was usually situated at or near the top of a hill where the wind was strong.

Totley Bole Hill on the western fringes of Sheffield consisted of a long low wall with two shorter walls at right angles to it at each end. At the base of a bole 20 feet (6.1 m) long were laid great trees called blocks. On these were laid blackwork, partly smelted ore about half a yard thick. Then came ten or twelve trees called shankards. On top of these three or four courses of fire trees were laid with fresh ore. This was ignited and burnt for about 48 hours. This smelted lead, which ran down channels provided for the purpose and was cast into sows of about 11 hundredweight. A single firing produced 16 fothers of lead (about 18 tons) from 160 loads of ore (about 40 tons) and 30 tons of wood. Much of the ore was left incompletely smelted having become blackwork. Some of this was smelted in a foot-pump blown furnace, but some was left to be used when the bole was next fired. Bole smelting was replaced by smelting in smeltmills in the late 16th century. That was in turn replaced by smelting in cupolas, a variety of reverberatory furnace in the 18th century.
