= Company of Mineral and Battery Works =

- Company type: joint stock company
- Industry: Mining
- Founded: September 17, 1565; 460 years ago
- Founder: Elizabeth I
- Products: "battery ware" (items of beaten metal), cast work, and wire of latten, iron and steel

The Company of Mineral and Battery Works was, with the Society of the Mines Royal, one of two mining monopolies created by Elizabeth I. The company's rights were based on a patent granted to William Humfrey on 17 September 1565. This was replaced on 28 May 1568 by a patent of incorporation, making it an early joint stock company. The Society of the Mines Royal was incorporated on the same day.

== Shareholders ==
The original shareholders were:

- William Humfrey
- Christopher Schutz
- Sir Nicholas Bacon
- Thomas Howard, 4th Duke of Norfolk
- William Herbert, 1st Earl of Pembroke
- Robert Dudley, 1st Earl of Leicester
- William Brooke, 10th Baron Cobham
- Sir William Cecil
- Sir Walter Mildmay
- Sir Henry Sidney
- Sir Francis Jobson
- Sir William Garrard, alderman
- Sir Rowland Hayward
- John Tamworth
- Peter Osborne
- Thomas Cecil
- Francis Agarde
- Thomas Fleetwood
- William Roberts
- Henry Coddenham
- Robert Christmas
- Roger Wetherall
- William Patten
- Christopher Chewte
- Thomas Smythe
- William Doddington
- William Byrde
- George Barne
- Anthony Gamage
- Richard Martin
- Edmund Roberts of Kent
- Francis Barty (or Berty)
- Richard Handford
- Edward Castlyn
- John Gooderiche
- John Lovyson
- William Williams
- Christopher Berkbecke
- Andrew Palmer

== Monopoly ==
The Company of Mineral and Battery Works had the monopoly right:

- to make "battery ware" (items of beaten metal), cast work, and wire of latten, iron, and steel.
- to mine calamine stone and use it to make 'latten' and other mixed metals
- to mine the royal metals of gold and silver in various English counties, most of which in fact contained little of those minerals. (Most of the metal used by the Company of Mineral and Battery works was mined by the Society of Mines Royal, with which the Mineral and Battery Works maintained a close relationship).

== Wireworks ==
Determined to make England less dependent on foreign goods, Elizabeth I in 1568 granted a patent of incorporation to William Humfrey, (a former Assay master of the Royal Mint), who had worked closely with William Cecil in setting up the first British wireworks at Tintern, Monmouthshire in 1567-8.

=== German expertise ===
Humfrey hired and brought to England a German copper maker, Christopher Schutz, along with his entire workshop. Initial goals included the production of brass in addition to the iron wire which was necessary for producing the cards required by the British wool industry, which had previously been imported. Due in part to difficulties with local materials however, the production of brass at the wireworks went poorly, and the more profitable production of iron wire became paramount.

=== Farmers in charge ===
The works were eventually let to 'farmers,' the first being Sir Richard Martyn, and Andrew Palmer, in 1570. Wheler died in 1575 and his widow sold her interest to Richard Hanbury. In the late 1570s, there were conflicts over wood for charcoal for ironworks. In 1583, the wireworks was leased to Martyn and Humfrey Mitchell (surveyor to Windsor Castle) for 15 years and Hanbury agreed to supply osmund iron to them. Conflicts followed over the price to be paid for osmund iron. This ended with Hanbury and his son-in-law Edmond Wheler being imprisoned in February 1598 in the Fleet and their property being sequestrated that July. The latter quickly led them to submit. The farmers were sometimes accused of poor management, and although the import of foreign cards was affirmed to be illegal in 1597, wire was at that time permitted to be imported from abroad, perhaps affirming the complaints of manufacturers of wire goods, who maintained that English wire was often of poor quality and in insufficient supply.

Thomas Hackett became farmer in 1597. The Company built a further wireworks at Whitebrook, (north of Tintern), in 1607. Subsequently, Sir Basil Brooke of Madeley (from 1627) and George Mynne were associated with him. Brooke was a Catholic and his estate was sequestrated during the Civil War.

In 1646, the Company accepted the offer of Thomas Foley of Stourbridge and later of Great Witley, Worcestershire to take over the wireworks, probably buying out the existing farmers. However wire made at Tintern was suffering competition from imported wire, and the company was unable to enforce the prohibition on its import. Foley died in 1677, leaving the wireworks to his son another Thomas, for whom they were managed by Henry Glover. With the competition from the import of foreign cards (which was supposed to be illegal), Foley was able to persuade the company that its privileges were of little value, and that his rent to them for Whitebrook should only be £5. The Tintern works reverted to the Duke of Beaufort as landlord in 1689, but Foley continued the Whitebrook works. Thomas Foley continued the Whitebook works until at least 1702, with Obadiah Lane as manager. However, the company's interest in wiremaking ceased in 1689. The Tintern wireworks operated successfully until about 1895.

== Lead and brass ==
The company licensed its right to use calamine to make brass in 1587 to a group of company members led by John Brode. They set up brass works at Isleworth, but a decade later the company obstructed them from mining calamine.

The company also engaged in litigation over lead mining in Derbyshire, which it alleged to be infringing its monopoly.

== Union with Mines Royal ==
In the 17th century the company was not particularly active, but periodically granted licences for mining or industrial activities that would infringe its rights. It probably informally amalgamated with the Society of the Mines Royal in about 1669. Ultimately in 1689, the passing of the Royal Mines Act 1688 (1 Will. & Mar. c. 30) effectively removed the monopoly mining rights of both companies, and the joint company became moribund.

In 1693, Moses Stringer was admitted to shares in both companies, being esteemed a person "ingenious and propence to chemistry and mineral studies". However nothing much happened until Stringer recovered the minute books in 1709 and called a meeting at his "elaboratory" and foundry in Blackfriars, which delegated complete power to him as "Mineral Master General". Some effort was made to exploit the companies' monopoly, by licensing mining, but probably with little success.

=== Onslow's Insurance ===
The companies' shares were bought in 1718 by a syndicate known as Onslow's Insurance, who wished to operate through a joint stock company. This was founded in 1717 and invited subscriptions for shares between August 1717 and January 1718 as the "Mercer's Hall Marine Company" or the "Undertaking kept at the Royal Exchange for insuring ships and merchandise at sea". They petitioned the Attorney-General for incorporation, but this was refused. They then bought the shares in the united Mines Royal and Mineral and Battery Works companies for £2904. 14 shillings and operated through this. However the House of Commons concluded that this was illegal (and similar insurance schemes) were illegal. Ultimately, by agreeing to pay £300,000 off George I's Civil List debts, they were able to obtain a charter of incorporation as the Royal Exchange Assurance.

=== Enterprises with William Wood ===
The incorporation of the Royal Exchange Assurance rendered the patent of the united companies redundant. Very shortly after it opened its subscriptions, subscriptions were sought for the Grand Lessees of ... Mines Royal and Mineral and Battery Works. A pamphlet entitled, The present state of Mr Wood's partnership, refers to it having a lease of mines in 39 counties, which may be those of the two companies. The promoter of this was William Wood.

Wood patented a new process for making iron (which proved not to be economically effective). They raised money to finance this by agreeing to sell thousands of tons of iron to the united companies. Wood and his associates would receive £60,000 and a block of shares. However Wood was unable to deliver anything like the quantity agreed. He sought the incorporation of the "Company of Ironmasters of Great Britain", but this was not granted. The affair was the subject of an enquiry by the Privy Council, but Wood died in 1730 and two of his sons were ultimately made bankrupt. £18,000 of the £40,000 actually advanced by the company was from Sir John Meres in the form of shares in the Charitable Corporation, another company soon to collapse. The company's advances were probably largely lost.

== Obscure later history ==
Subsequent references to the two companies are to them separately.

The Mineral and Battery Company is recorded as mining in Ireland in 1741. It may also have had a copper battery work at (or near) Rogerstone near Newport.

A company called Mines Royal, which may (or may not) have been the same, had a copper works at Neath Abbey in Glamorgan from 1757.

== See also ==
- Case of Mines - 1568 court case also known as R v. Earl of Northumberland
