= Manor of Bideford =

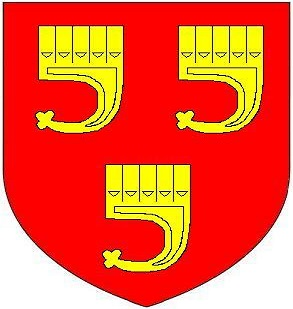
Arms of Grenville, Gules, three clarions or

The manor of Bideford in North Devon was held by the Grenville family between the 12th and 18th centuries. The full descent is as follows:

== Anglo-Saxons ==
Hubba the Dane was said to have attacked Devon in the area around Bideford near Northam or near Kenwith Castle and was repelled by either Alfred the Great (849-899) or by the Saxon Earl of Devon.

== Normans ==
=== Brictric/Queen Matilda ===
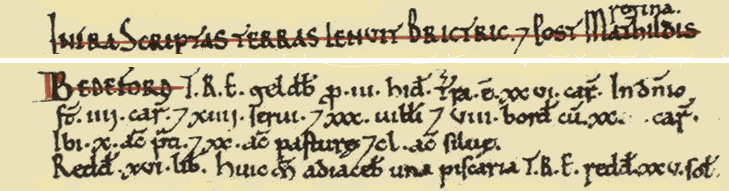
Domesday Book entry for Bedeford

The manor of Bedeford was recorded in the Domesday Book of 1086 as held at some time in chief from William the Conqueror by the great Saxon nobleman Brictric, but later held by the king's wife Matilda of Flanders (c. 1031 – 1083). There were then 30 villagers, 8 smallholders and 14 slaves in Bideford. The unabbreviated Latin text of the entry, and a translation, follows:

Infra scriptas terras tenuit Brictric post regina Mathildis...Bedeford Tempore Regis Eduardi geldabat pro iii hidae. Terra est xxvi carrucae. In dominio sunt iiii carrucae, xiiii servi, xxx villani, viii bordarii cum xx carrucis. Ibi sunt x acrae pratae, xx acrae pasturae, cl acrae silvae. Reddit xvi librae. Huic manerio adjacet una piscaria (quae) Tempore Regis Eduardi reddabat xxv soldii
"The below written lands Brictric held, afterwards Queen Matilda...Bideford in the time of King Edward (the Confessor) paid geld for 3 hides. There is land for 26 plough-teams. In demesne there are 4 plough-teams, 14 servants, 30 villagers, 8 smallholders with 20 plough-teams. There are 10 acres of meadow, 20 acres of pasture, 150 acres of woodland. It returns £16. To this manor lies adjacent a fishery which in the time of King Edward (the Confessor) paid 25 soldi"

According to the account by the Continuator of Wace and others, in his youth Brictric declined the romantic advances of Matilda and his great fiefdom was thereupon seized by her. Whatever the truth of the matter, years later when she was acting as Regent in England for William the Conqueror, she used her authority to confiscate Brictric's lands and threw him into prison, where he died. The Exon Domesday notes that Bideford and nearby Littleham were held at fee farm from the king by Gotshelm, a Devonshire tenant-in-chief of 28 manors and brother of Walter de Claville. Gotshelm's 28 manors descended to the Honour of Gloucester, as did most of Brictric's.

=== Feudal barony of Gloucester ===
Brictric's lands were granted after the death of Matilda in 1083 by her eldest son King William Rufus (1087–1100) to Robert FitzHamon (died 1107), the conqueror of Glamorgan, whose daughter and sole heiress Maud (or Mabel) FitzHamon brought them to her husband Robert de Caen, 1st Earl of Gloucester (pre-1100-1147), a natural son of Matilda's younger son King Henry I (1100–1135). Thus Brictric's fiefdom became the feudal barony of Gloucester. The Grenville family held Bideford for many centuries under the overlordship of the feudal barons of Gloucester, which barony was soon absorbed into the Crown, when they became tenants in chief.

==== Grenville ====
According to the 1895 work of the family's historian Rev. Roger Granville, Rector of Bideford, the descent of the manor of Bideford in North Devon, England, was as follows:

===== Sir Richard de Grenville (died after 1142) =====
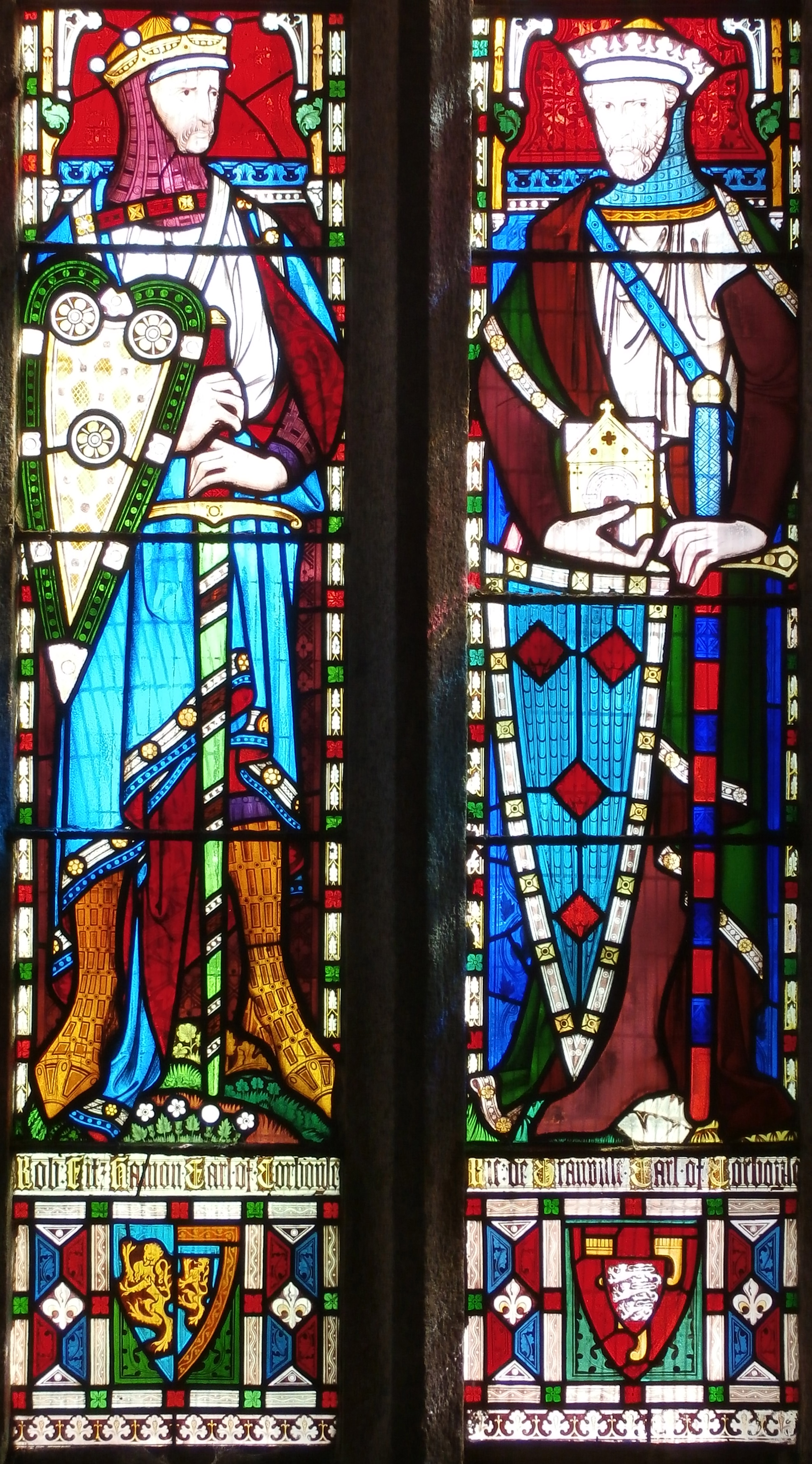
1860 imaginary depiction of Robert FitzHamon (died 1107) (left) and his younger brother Richard de Grenville (died after 1142) (right), Church of St James the Great, Kilkhampton, Cornwall

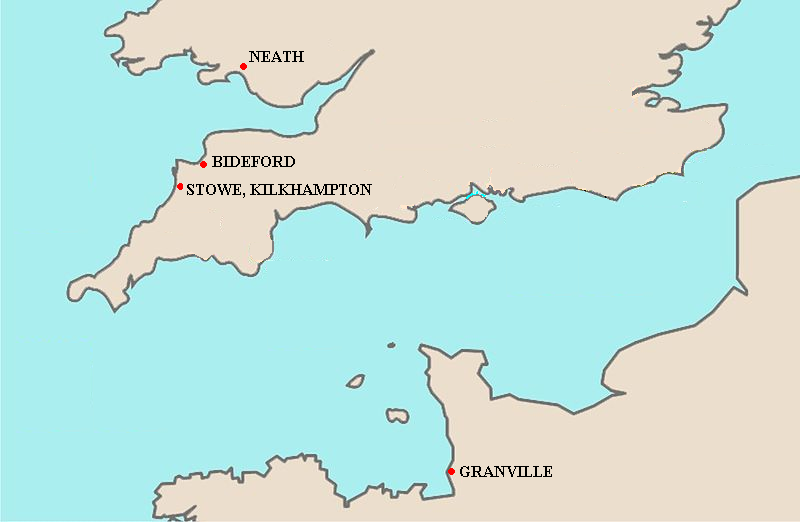
Historic seats of the Grenville family (spelled "Granville" after 1661) in Normandy (Granville, Manche), Glamorgan (Neath Castle), Devon (Bideford) & Cornwall (Stowe, Kilkhampton)

Sir Richard de Grenville (died after 1142) (alias de Grainvilla, de Greinvill, etc.) was one of the Twelve Knights of Glamorgan who served in the Norman Conquest of Glamorgan under Robert FitzHamon (died 1107), the first Norman feudal baron of Gloucester and Lord of Glamorgan from 1075. He obtained from FitzHamon the lordship of Neath, Glamorgan, in which he built Neath Castle and in 1129 founded Neath Abbey. Richard de Grenville is by tradition the founder and ancestor of the prominent Westcountry Grenville family of Stowe in the parish of Kilkhampton in Cornwall and of Bideford in Devon.

By tradition Richard de Grenville is said by Prince (died 1723), (apparently following Fuller's Worthies)) after he had founded Neath Abbey and bestowed upon it all his military acquisitions for its maintenance, to have "returned to his patrimony at Bideford where he lived in great honour and reputation the rest of his days". However, according to Round no proof exists that Richard de Grenville ever held the manor of Bideford, which was later one of the principal seats of the Westcountry Grenville family. It was however certainly one of the constituent manors of the Honour of Gloucester granted by King William Rufus to Robert FitzHamon." Richard de Grenville is known to have held seven knight's fees from the Honour of Gloucester, either granted to him by his FitzHamon or the latter's son-in-law and heir Robert, 1st Earl of Gloucester (1100–1147). Round supposes that the Grenvilles of Bideford and Stowe were instead descended from a certain "Robert de Grenville" (alias de Grainville, de Grainavilla, etc.) who was a junior witness to Richard's foundation charter of Neath Abbey and who in the 1166 Cartae Baronum return was listed as holding one knight's fee from the Earl of Gloucester, feudal baron of Gloucester. Robert's familial relationship, if any, to Richard is unknown.

===== Richard de Grenville (fl. late 12th century) =====
Richard de Grenville (eldest son, by tradition). He married Adelina de Beaumont, and during the reign of King Henry II (1154–1189) held 3 1/2 knight's fees from the Honour of Gloucester.

===== Richard de Grenville (died 1204) =====
Richard de Grenville (died 1204) (son), who married a certain Gundreda. He died in 1204, leaving his children as minors. King John granted the wardship of his son and heir Richard de Grenville to Richard Fleminge in consideration for six hundred marks and six palfreys.

===== Richard de Grenville (died c. 1217) =====
Richard de Grenville (died c. 1217) (son). As arranged by his father, he married the daughter and heiress of Thomas de Middleton, whose wardship and marriage the former had acquired from King John in 1204.

===== Richard de Grenville (fl. 1295) =====
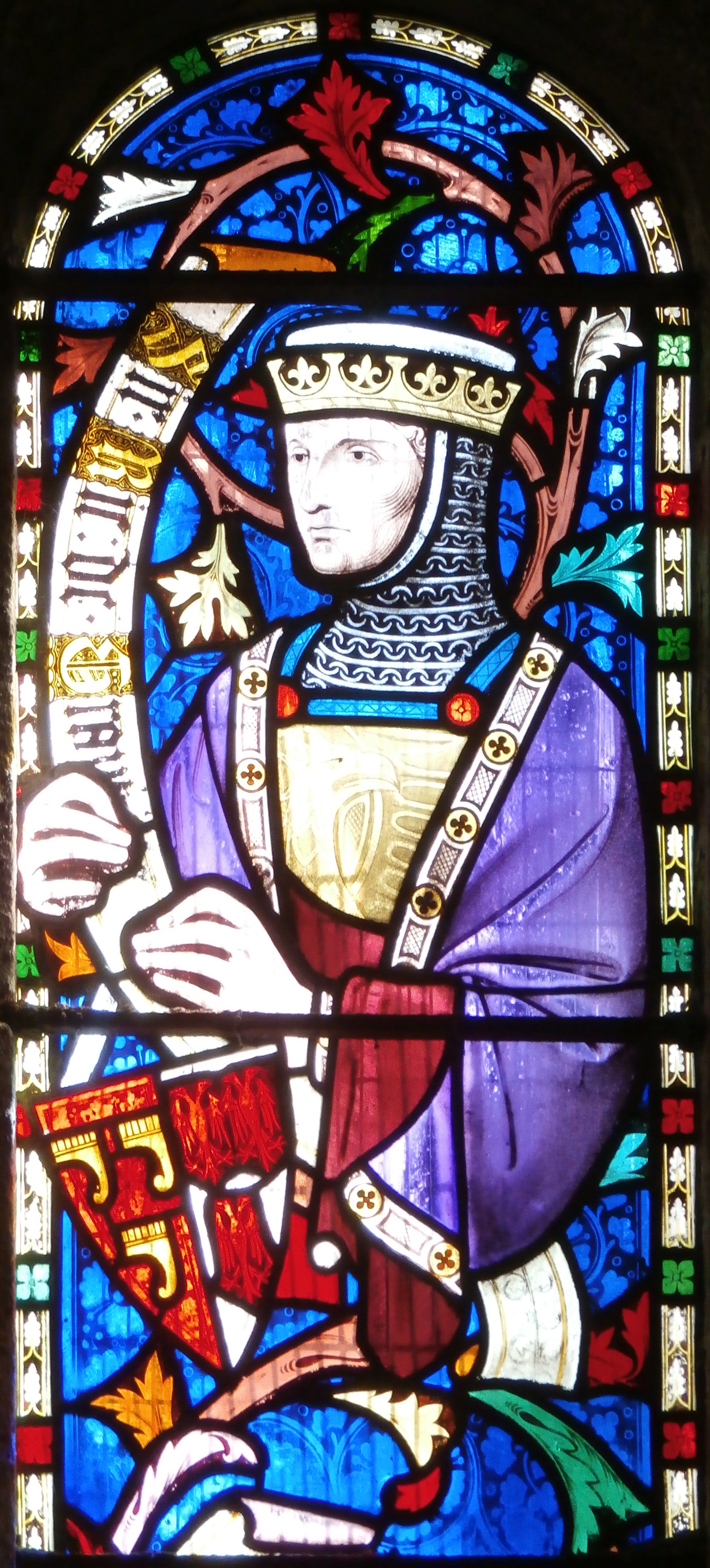
1860 imaginary depiction of Richard de Grenville (fl. 1295), with escutcheon showing the arms of Grenville impaling Trewent

Richard de Grenville (son) (fl. 1295), who married Jane Trewent, daughter and heiress of William Trewent of Blisland, Cornwall, in the hundred of Trigg Minor, situated 5 miles north-east of Bodmin. A roll of arms from the reign of King Edward III states: Monsire Esteine de Trewent, port les armes de Tyes, a trois egles de gules a double teste. ("Monsieur Stephen de Trewent bears the arms of de Tyes, three eagles with two heads gules"). These are the arms shown in the 19th century stained glass window in St James Church, Kilkhampton, shown impaled by Grenville. He left four sons:

- Richard de Grenville (died 1310) (eldest son and heir)
- Bartholomew Grenville (died 1325), heir to his elder brother
- Robert de Grenville
- William de Grenville (died 1315), Lord Chancellor of England and Archbishop of York.

===== Richard de Grenville (died 1310) =====
Richard de Grenville (died 1310) (eldest son and heir). He married Isabel of Monte Treganion, daughter of Joscelyn of Monte Treganion, but died without children.

===== Bartholomew Grenville (died 1325) =====
Bartholomew Grenville (died 1325) (younger brother). He married Amy Vyvyan, daughter of Sir Vyell Vyvyan of Treviddren, Cornwall. Walter de Stapeldon, Bishop of Exeter, granted to "Sir Bartholomew and his wife Amy" a licence for the celebration of divine service in capella sua de Bydeforde ("in his chapel of Bideford").

===== Henry de Grenville (died 1327) =====
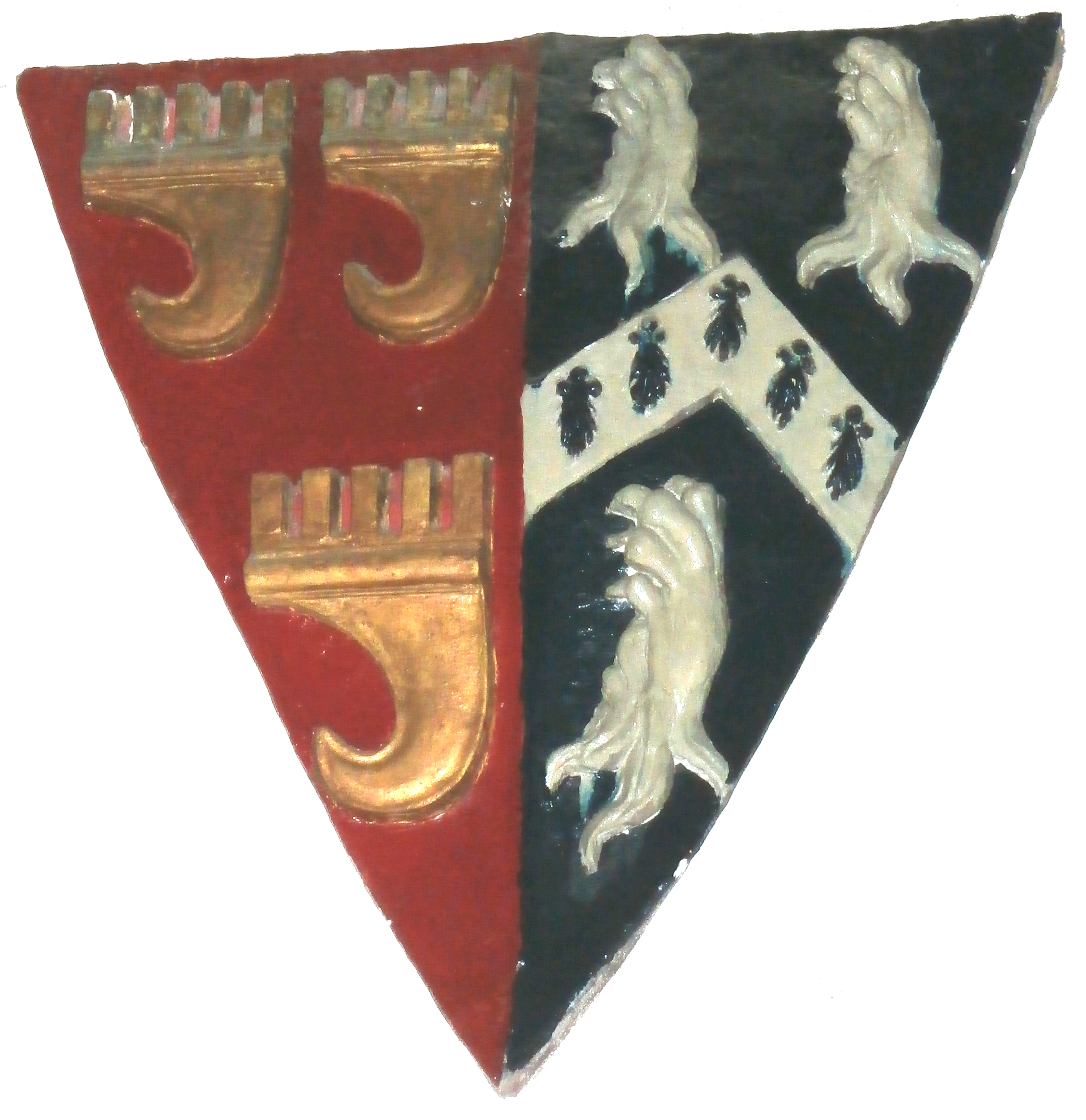
17th c. depiction of arms of Henry Grenville (died 1327) (Gules, three clarions or) impaling Wortham (Sable, a chevron ermine between three lion's gambs erased argent), the arms of his wife Ann Wortham. Kilkhampton Church

Henry de Grenville (died 1327) (son), who married Ann Wortham, daughter and heiress of the family of Wortham, near Lifton, Devon. He was buried at Kilkhampton, where in 1895 his armorials impaling Wortham (Sable, a chevron between three lion's paws argent) were said to survive. In 1324 Henry de Grenvile presented to the Rectory of Kilkhampton Thomas Stapeldon, brother to Bishop Stapeldon, and also Walter de Prodhomme, a nephew of the ishop's, to the Rectory of Bideford in the same year. The Bishop in his will bequeathed to Walter de Prodhomme a legacy of 40s. for the maintenance of Bideford Bridge, as well as 10 marks pro defectibus Ecclesiae de Bideforde reperandis ("for the repairing of the Church of Bideford").

===== Sir Theobald de Grenville I (1323 – c. 1377) =====
Sir Theobald de Grenville I (1323 – c. 1377) (son), the builder of Bideford Long Bridge and Sheriff of Devon. He married Joyce de Beaumont, daughter of Thomas de Beaumont, Earl of Meulan. Following a financial dispute between the king and the Bishop of Exeter, Sheriff Theobald was ordered by the king in the summer of 1347 to enforce an order made against the bishop in the Court of King's Bench. He marched to the bishop's manor of Bishops Tawton at the head of an army of 500 persons and seized goods to the value stated, not without killing several occupants of that manor. In January 1348 he made apology on bended knee to the bishop in his great hall at Chudleigh.

===== Sir Theobald de Grenville II (c. 1343 – July 1381) =====
Sir Theobald de Grenville II (c. 1343 – July 1381) (son), who married by 1365, Margaret Courtenay (born between 1342 and 1350, died after July 1381), a daughter of Sir Hugh Courtenay, 2nd Earl of Devon (12 July 1303 – 2 May 1377), and his wife, Margaret de Bohun (b. 3 April 1311 - d. 16 December 1391), daughter of Humphrey de Bohun, 4th Earl of Hereford (by his wife Elizabeth of Rhuddlan, a daughter of King Edward I)

===== Sir John Grenville (died 1412) =====
Sir John Grenville (died 1412) (eldest son and heir), Sheriff of Devon in 1395, Sheriff of Cornwall in 1411 and four times MP for Devon, in 1388, 1394, 1397 and 1402. At some time before September 1391 he married Margaret Burghersh (c. 1376 – c. 1421), elder daughter and co-heiress of Sir John Burghersh, MP, of Ewelme, Oxfordshire. He had no male children, only a daughter who predeceased him. His wife survived him and remarried to John Arundell (c. 1392 – 1423), MP, (who during his marriage lived at Bideford) eldest son of Sir John Arundell (c. 1366 – 1435), MP, of Lanherne, Steward of the Duchy of Cornwall.

===== William de Grenville, Esq. (died 1450) =====
William de Grenville, Esq. (born by 1381 - died 1450) (younger brother). He married twice, firstly to Thomasine Cole, daughter of John Cole, by whom he had no children. His second marriage was to Philippa Bonville (living 1464), a daughter or sister of William Bonville, 1st Baron Bonville (1392–1461). Lord Bonville was an enemy of the Courtenay Earls of Devon of Tiverton Castle, but an ally of their cousins the Courtenays of Powderham. By his second marriage Grenville had several children: his son and heir was Sir Thomas Grenville.

===== Sir Thomas Grenville I (died c. 1483) =====
Sir Thomas Grenville I (born by 21 January 1432 - died c. 1483) (son), the first member of the family to modernise his surname by omitting the particule "de". He served as Sheriff of Gloucester in 1480 and Sheriff of Cornwall in 1483. He married twice, firstly in 1447 in the Basset family's Umberleigh Chapel to Anne Courtenay, a daughter of Sir Philip Courtenay (1404–1463) of Powderham, by his wife Elizabeth Hungerford, daughter of Walter Hungerford, 1st Baron Hungerford (died 1449). One of her brothers was Peter Courtenay (died 1492) Bishop of Exeter. The marriage was childless. He married secondly to Elizabeth Gorges, daughter of Sir Theobald Gorges, K.B., lord of Wraxall, Somerset, and Braunton Gorges, co. Devon by his wife, Jane Hankford. His younger son Rev. John Grenville (died 1509) was Rector of Bideford from 1504.

===== Sir Thomas Grenville II (died c. 1513) =====
Sir Thomas Grenville II, K.B., (c. 1453 – c. 1513), (eldest son and heir). He was Sheriff of Cornwall in 1481 and in 1486. During the Wars of the Roses in his youth he was a Lancastrian supporter and took part in the conspiracy against King Richard III organised by the Duke of Buckingham. On the accession of King Henry VII (1485–1509) and at the end of the wars, Grenville was appointed one of the Esquires of the Body to King Henry VII. On the marriage of Prince Arthur to Katherine of Aragon on 14 November 1501 he was appointed K.B. He served on the Commission of the Peace for Devon from 1510 to his death.

===== Sir Roger Grenville (1477–1523) =====
Sir Roger Grenville (1477–1523) (eldest son and heir by his father's first wife Isabel Gilbert). he served as Sheriff of Cornwall in 1510–11, 1517–18, 1522, and was present within the Cornish contingent at the Field of the Cloth of Gold. He married Margaret Whitleigh (alias Whitlegh, Whitely, etc.) one of the two daughters and co-heiresses of Richard Whitleigh (died 1509) of Efford in the parish of Egg Buckland on the south coast of Devon. Sir Roger Grenville had by his wife Margaret Whitleigh, three sons and six daughters. His second son was John Grenville (c. 1506 – c. 1562), three times MP for Exeter, in 1545, 1554 and 1558.

===== Sir Richard Grenville (c. 1495 – 1550) =====
Sir Richard Grenville (c. 1495 – 1550) (eldest son and heir). He entered the Inner Temple, with his brother John, in 1520 and served as MP for Cornwall in 1529. He married Matilda Bevil, a daughter and co-heiress of John Bevil of Gwarnock, St Allen, Cornwall. He was pre-deceased by his eldest son:

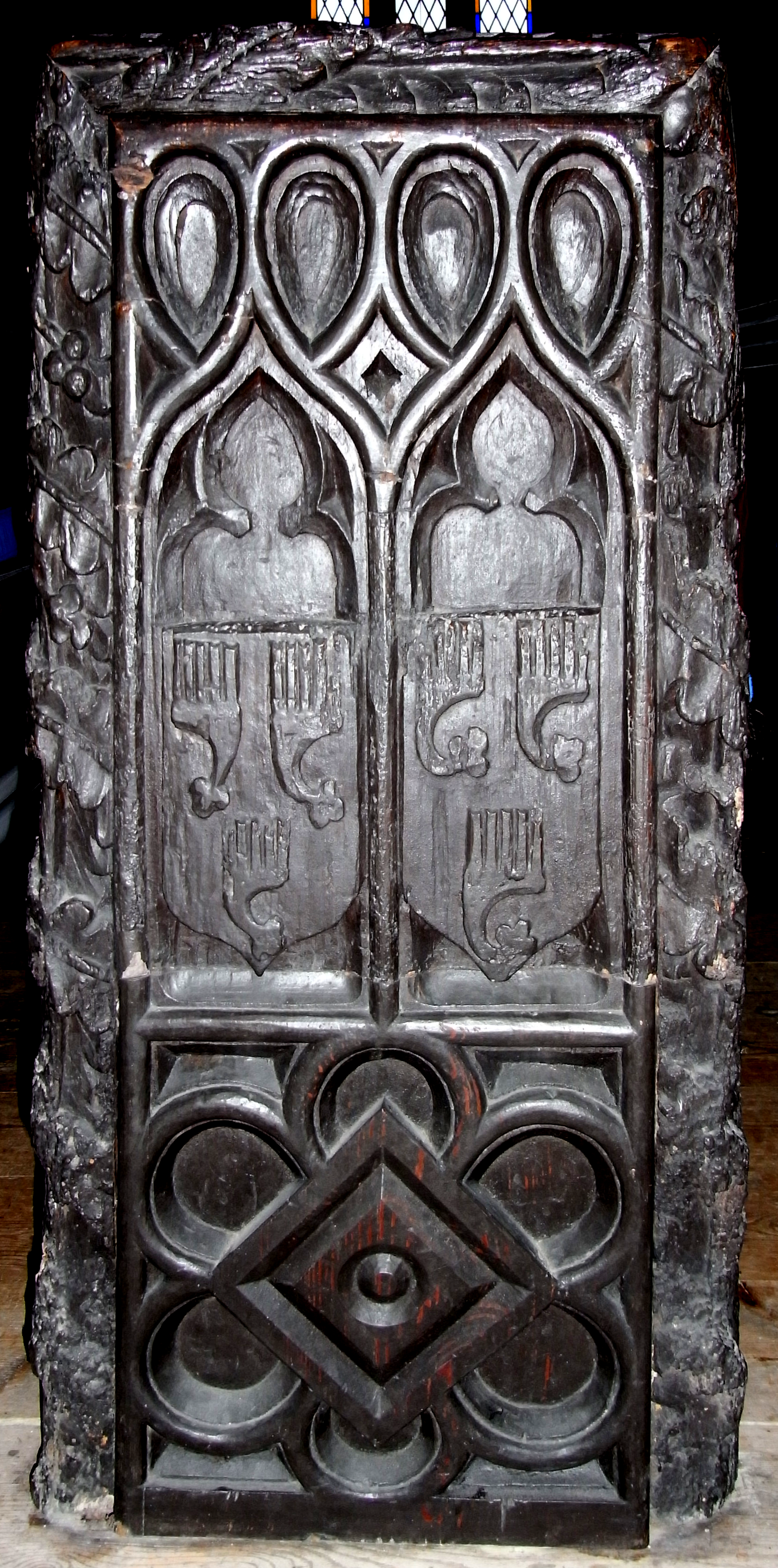
Grenville arms on a bench-end in All Hallows Church, Woolfardisworthy, North Devon

- Roger Grenville (died 1545), present on the Mary Rose when it sank in Portsmouth Harbour in 1545, whose son was the heroic Admiral Sir Richard Grenville (1542–1591). Roger Grenville (died 1545) married Thomasine Cole (d.1586), a daughter of Thomas Cole of Slade in the parish of Cornwood in Devon and of Bucks in the parish of Woolfardisworthy, North Devon. A bench-end from this period displaying the arms of Grenville survives in All Hallows Church, Woolfardisworthy. Thomasine survived her husband and remarried to Thomas Arundell (d.1574) of Ley and of Clifton in the parish of Landulph, in Cornwall, a grandson of Nicholas Arundell of Trerice by his wife Johanna St John (died 1482).

===== Admiral Sir Richard Grenville (1542–1591) =====
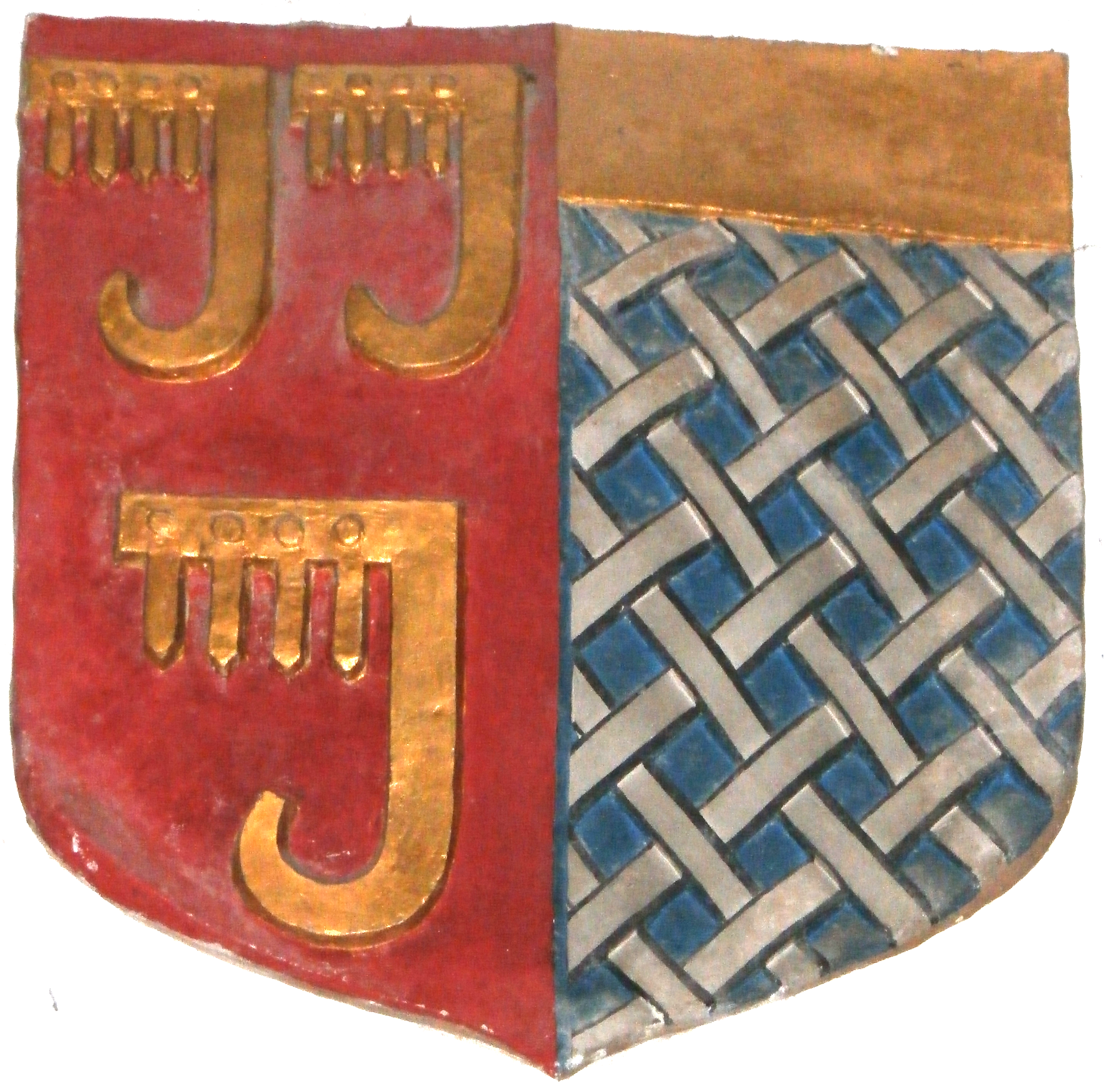
Arms of Richard Grenville (1542–1591) (Gules, three clarions or) impaling St Ledger (Azure fretty argent, a chief or), arms of his wife Mary St Ledger. Kilkhampton Church

Admiral Sir Richard Grenville (1542–1591) (grandson), was Captain of the Revenge, MP for Cornwall, Sheriff of Cork from 1569 to 1570, Sheriff of Cornwall in 1576–77, and an Armed Merchant Fleet Owner, privateer, colonizer, and explorer. He died at the Battle of Flores (1591), fighting heroically against overwhelming odds, and refusing to surrender his ship to the far more numerous Spanish. He married Mary St Leger (c. 1543 – 1623), daughter of Sir John St Ledger of Annery, Monkleigh, (near Bideford) and heir to her brother. She outlived her husband and died aged about 80 on 9 November 1623 and was buried at St Mary's Church, Bideford. The family initially lived at Buckland Abbey before moving to a newly built house at Bideford. An escutcheon showing the arms of Grenville impaling St Ledger survives in Kilkhampton Church.

===== Sir Bernard Grenville (1567–1636) =====
Sir Bernard Grenville (1567–1636), (eldest surviving son and heir). He served as Sheriff of Cornwall in 1596–97, and was a Justice of the Peace and a Deputy Lieutenant of Cornwall in 1598. He was appointed a Gentleman of the Privy Chamber to King Charles I in 1628. He was elected a Member of Parliament for Bodmin, Cornwall, in 1597. He married Elizabeth Bevill, only daughter and heiress of Phillip Bevill of Brinn and Killigarth.

===== Sir Bevil Grenville (1596–1643) =====
Sir Bevil Grenville (1596–1643) (eldest son and heir), a Royalist soldier in the Civil War, killed in action in heroic circumstances at the Battle of Lansdowne in 1643. He served as MP for Cornwall 1621–1625 and 1640–42, and for Launceston 1625–1629 and 1640. He married Grace Smith, a daughter by his second marriage of Sir George Smith (died 1619) of Madworthy, near Exeter, Devon, a merchant who served as MP for Exeter in 1604, was three times Mayor of Exeter and was Exeter's richest citizen, possessing 25 manors. Grace's half-sister Elizabeth Smythe was the wife of Sir Thomas Monk (1570–1627) of Potheridge, Devon, MP for Camelford in 1626, and mother of the great general George Monck, 1st Duke of Albemarle, KG (1608–1670). It was largely due to his close kinship to his first cousin the Duke that Sir Bevil's son Sir John Granville was raised to the peerage in 1660 as Earl of Bath, and was also granted the reversion of the Dukedom of Albemarle in the event of the failure of George Monck's male issue.

His third son was Bernard Granville, father of George Granville, 1st Baron Lansdown (1666–1735). George became heir male of the family on the extinction of the senior male line in 1711, following the death of William Granville, 3rd Earl of Bath (1692–1711), and due to this in 1712 was raised to the peerage as "Baron Lansdown of Bideford".

===== John Granville, 1st Earl of Bath (1628–1701) =====
John Granville, 1st Earl of Bath (1628–1701) (son and heir). He was a major figure in effecting, in a subsidiary role to his cousin George Monck, 1st Duke of Albemarle, the Restoration of the Monarchy to King Charles II in 1660, for which service he was elevated to the peerage. He left two sons and three daughters, who were in their issue the eventual co-heiresses of his grandson the 3rd Earl:

- Jane Granville (died 27 February 1696), wife of Sir William Leveson-Gower, 4th Baronet and mother of John Leveson-Gower, 1st Baron Gower (1675–1709) and grandmother of John Leveson-Gower, 1st Earl Gower (1694–1754).
- Catherine Granville, wife of Craven Peyton (c. 1663 – 1738), Member of Parliament for Boroughbridge 1705–1713. She died childless.
- Grace Granville, suo jure Countess Granville (3 September 1654 – 18 October 1744), wife of George Carteret, 1st Baron Carteret and mother of John Carteret, 2nd Earl Granville.

===== Charles Granville, 2nd Earl of Bath (1661–1701) =====
Charles Granville, 2nd Earl of Bath (1661–1701), (eldest son and heir). The family changed the spelling of its surname to "Granville", which was believed to be a more accurate reflection of its Norman origins at Granville in Normandy. He died from a gunshot wound during the preparations for his father's funeral, possibly suicide. He was twice married, firstly to Lady Martha Osborne (1664–1689), daughter of Thomas Osborne, 1st Duke of Leeds. Without children. Secondly in 1691 he married Isabella van Nassau (1668–1692), sister of Henry Nassau d'Auverquerque, 1st Earl of Grantham. His second son was John Granville, 1st Baron Granville of Potheridge (1665–1707).

===== William Granville, 3rd Earl of Bath (1692–1711) =====
William Henry Granville, 3rd Earl of Bath (1692–1711) (son and heir by father's 2nd marriage). He died of smallpox aged 19 without children when the earldom became extinct. His co-heirs were the surviving descendants of the three daughters of the 1st Earl:

- John Leveson-Gower, 1st Earl Gower (1694–1754), grandson of Jane Granville (died 1696), daughter of the 1st Earl and wife of Sir William Leveson-Gower, 4th Baronet.
- Grace Granville, suo jure Countess Granville (1654–1744), daughter of the 1st Earl and wife of George Carteret, 1st Baron Carteret and mother of John Carteret, 2nd Earl Granville

==== Carteret/Gower ====
The Devonshire and Cornwall estates, after the death of the last Earl of Bath, were divided between Lady Carteret, suo jure Countess Granville (1654–1744) (née Lady Grace Granville), one of the daughters of the first Earl, and John Leveson-Gower, 1st Earl Gower (1694–1754) the grandson of Lady Gower (died 1696) (née Lady Jane Granville), the other daughter, who had married Sir William Gower. "Grace, Countess Granville" and "John, Lord Gower" as joint patrons made presentations to the Rectory of Bideford in 1723 and 1727, and "John, Lord Gower" as sole patron made a presentation in 1744. Lady Grace's descendants received as their share mostly the Cornwall estates while Lady Jane's descendants received mostly the Devon estates, including Potheridge.

==== Clevland/Saltren-Willet/Christie ====
The manor of Bideford was sold in about 1750 to John Clevland (1706–1763) of Tapeley, in the parish of Westleigh, near Bideford, and descended to his heirs, by whom Tapeley, and the lordship of Bideford, is still owned in 2014. The advowson of the rectory of Bideford was sold to the Buck family (later Stucley) of Daddon House, which made their first presentation in 1783.

== Bibliography ==
- Byrne, Muriel St. Clare, (ed.) The Lisle Letters, 6 vols, University of Chicago Press, Chicago & London, 1981.
- Granville, Roger, M.A., (Rector of Bideford). The History of the Granville Family Traced Back to Rollo, First Duke of the Normans, with Pedigrees etc. (Exeter, 1895).
- Pole, Sir William (died 1635), Collections Towards a Description of the County of Devon, Sir John-William de la Pole (ed.), London, 1791.
- Risdon, Tristram (died 1640), Survey of Devon, 1811 edition, London, 1811, with 1810 Additions, pp. 280–3, Manor of Bideford
- Round, J. Horace, Family Origins and Other Studies, London, 1930, "The Granvilles and the Monks", pp. 130–169.
- Vivian, Lt.Col. J.L., (Ed.) The Visitations of Cornwall, Comprising the Heralds' Visitations of 1530, 1573 & 1620. Exeter, 1887.
- Vivian, Lt.Col. J.L., (Ed.) The Visitations of the County of Devon: Comprising the Heralds' Visitations of 1531, 1564 & 1620. Exeter, 1895.
- Weis, Frederick Lewis., et al. The Magna Charta Sureties, 1215. Fifth edition. (Baltimore: Genealogical Publishing Co., Inc., 1999).
