= Richard Grenville (died 1550) =

English soldier, politician and administrator

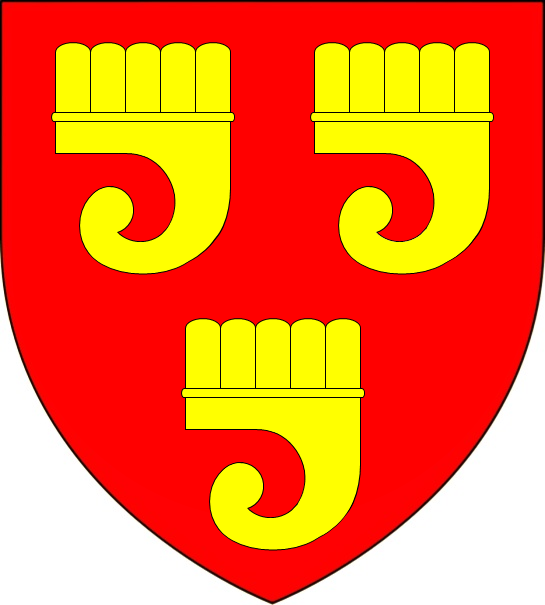
Arms of Grenville: Gules, three clarions or

Early 16th c. bench end in Sutcombe Church in Devon, showing the arms of Grenville

Richard Grenville (died 1550) lord of the manor of Stowe, Kilkhampton in Cornwall and of Bideford in Devon, was an English soldier, politician, and administrator who served as a Member of Parliament for Cornwall in 1529, and served as Sheriff of Cornwall and Sheriff of Devon.

== Origins ==
Richard Grenville was the son of Sir Roger Grenville (d. 1523) of Stowe and of Bideford, by his wife Margaret Whitleigh. His forebears had held those two seats since the 12th century. One of his sisters, Amye, married John Drake of Musbury, Devon. By tradition the earliest English ancestor of the family was Sir Richard de Grenville (died after 1142) (alias de Grainvilla, de Greinvill, etc.), one of the Twelve Knights of Glamorgan who served in the Norman Conquest of Glamorgan under Robert FitzHamon (died 1107), the first Norman feudal baron of Gloucester and Lord of Glamorgan from 1075. He obtained from FitzHamon the lordship of Neath, Glamorgan, in which he built Neath Castle and in 1129 founded Neath Abbey.

== Career ==
Early in his career Richard Grenville had some minor posts in the royal household. On the death of his father in 1523 he completed his father's term as Sheriff of Cornwall, a post he also held in 1526–7, 1544–5. In between he was Sheriff of Devon in 1532–3. He was Justice of the Peace for Cornwall from 1524 till his death and also in Devon, at Exeter from 1535 to 1547.

Further afield he was Marshal of Calais, a post that required his residence there, from October 1535 to October 1540. In 1544 Grenville accompanied the king to France as a commander in the English army.

He was active in his Christian faith and openly favoured 'God's word'.

In the Prayer Book Rebellion of 1549 Grenville was called upon against the western rebels, and with a company of friends and followers he defended Trematon Castle. When they were unsuccessful in defending the castle, he and his wife were held in custody in Launceston prison. Grenville contracted a fatal illness probably while in gaol and died from it on 18 March 1550. He was buried at Kilkhampton five days later.

== Marriage and family ==
Richard Grenville married Matilda Beville, daughter of John Beville of Gwarnick, near Truro, Cornwall.

Their son, Sir Roger Grenville, had been captain of the Mary Rose and drowned when it sank in Portsmouth Harbour in 1545. Sir Richard was therefore succeeded by Roger's son, Richard Grenville, naval commander and the captain of Revenge.
