= Hamon Dentatus =

Norman nobleman in England

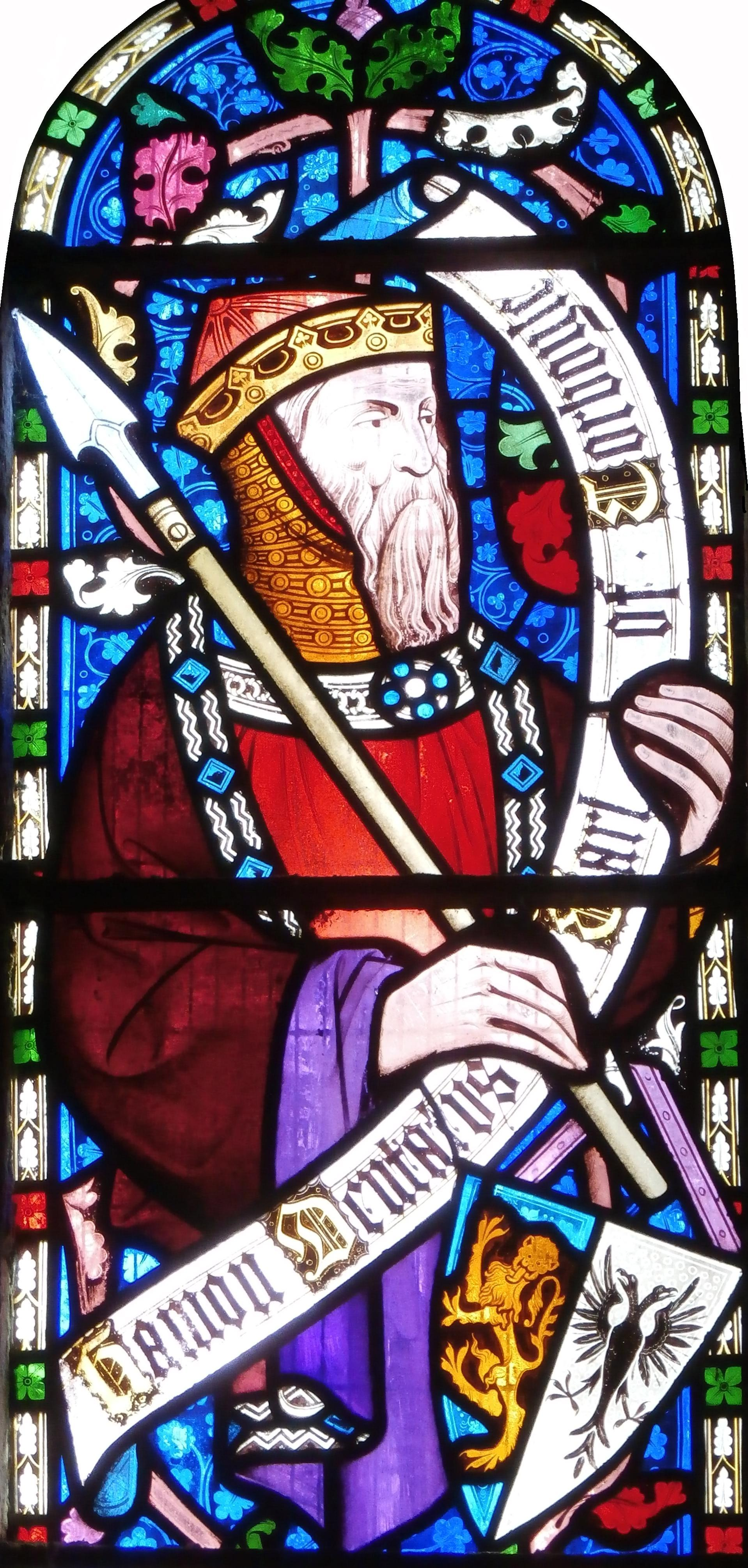
"Hamon Dentatus, Earl of Corboyle" (d. 1047). Detail from the 1st Grenville Window (1860) in the south wall of Grenville Chapel, Kilkhampton Church. His shield shows attributed arms of Azure, a lion rampant or impaling Argent, an eagle with two heads sable

Hamon Dentatus (died 1047) was a Norman baron who was killed while rebelling with other Norman barons against William II, Duke of Normandy (r. 1035–1087) at the Battle of Val-ès-Dunes. The epithet "Dentatus" or "Dens" was probably given to Hamon because he was born with teeth. Little is known about Hamon's life.

Hamon's name appears in historical texts under several different spellings. William of Poitiers (c. 1020–1090), in an early account of the battle, rendered Hamon in Latin as "Haimonem agnomine Dentatum." Orderic Vitalis (1075–c. 1142) said William the Conqueror explicitly recalled "Haymon-aux-Dents" as having been among the rebels. Wace's account of the battle, written around 1174, called "Hamon-As-Dens" the lord of "Thorignie," "Mezi," and "Croillie." The locations of those lordships roughly correspond to present day Torigni-sur-Vire, Grandcamp-Maisy, and Creully. Benoît de Sainte-Maure, (d. 1173) called him "Hamun" and characterized him as an "antichrist" for rebelling against his lord the duke. Both Wace and Benoît said that Haimo used the name of Saint Amand as his battle cry. Saint Amand was the patron saint of Hamon's fiefdom of Thorigny, which was sometimes called "Saint Amand of Thorigny."

Pezet's history of the barons of Creully, claimed that "Haimon-Az-Dentz" was made the first baron of Creully. Pezet stated that the fiefdom of Creully was originally established in 912, according to a text that was destroyed in the French Revolution.

Early in the Battle of Val-ès-Dunes, King Henry I of France (r. 1027–1060), who had sided with the duke, was knocked off his horse by Hamon. However, French forces killed Hamon before the baron could further harm their king. According to another source, it was not Hamon, but his uncle, Guillesen, who unhorsed the French king. William of Malmesbury (c. 1095–1143) wrote that King Henry commanded his men to give Hamon an honorable burial "in admiration of his valour." Wace said that Hamon was buried near the church of Esquay-Notre-Dame.

== Family ==
He left one known son, Hamo Dapifer (died circa 1100) (alias Haimo) an Anglo-Norman royal official under both King William the Conqueror (1066–1087) and his son King William Rufus (1087–1100). He held the office, from which his epithet derives, known in Latin as dapifer and in French seneschal, in English "steward", as well as the office of Sheriff of Kent. This younger Hamo was the father of Robert Fitzhamon (d. 1107), the conqueror of Glamorgan.

== Grenville family tradition ==
A seventeenth century pedigree of the Grenville or Granville family of Stowe claimed that Hamon Dentatus had two sons: Richard de Grenville, who founded the Grenville family, and Robert Fitzhamon. This contradicted the chronicle of William of Malmesbury, which said that Hamon Dentatus was Robert Fitzhamon's grandfather (avus). The Grenville pedigree also claimed that Hamon Dentatus was a younger son of Mauger, Count of Corbeil and thus grandson of Richard I, Duke of Normandy. Historian and genealogist J. Horace Round contended that the Granville family had "hatched [the connection] in the seventeenth century... wishing to exalt Hamon Dentatus," whom they claimed as their ancestor. The Grenville family commissioned a depiction of Haimo Dentatus on a stained glass window that was installed in 1860 in the Granville Chapel of the Church of St. James the Great, Kilkhampton, Cornwall, near the family mansion Stowe House.

== Sources ==
- Barlow, Frank (1983). William Rufus. Berkeley: University of California Press. ISBN 0-520-04936-5.
- Clark, George Thomas (1883). The Land of Morgan: Being a Contribution towards the History of the Lordship of Glamorgan. London: Whiting & Co., Lim. ISBN 5-870-73910-1.
- Collins, Arthur (1750). A Supplement to the Four Volumes of The Peerage of England. London: W. Innys, J. and P. Knapton, S. Birt, T. Wotton, R. Manby and H. S. Cox, and E. Withers.
- Hollister, C. Warren (2001). Frost, Amanda Clark (ed.). Henry I. New Haven: Yale University Press. ISBN 0-300-08858-2.
- Keats-Rohan, K. S. B. (1999). Domesday People: A Prosopography of Persons Occurring in English Documents, 1066-1166: Domesday Book. Ipswich, UK: Boydell Press. ISBN 0-85115-722-X.
- Pezet, Romain Auguste Laurent (1854). Les barons de Creully: etudes historiques. Bayeux: Typographie de St.-Ange Duvant, impremeur de la Societe.
- Poitiers, William of (1807). Du Chesne, André (ed.). "Gesta Guillelmi Ducis Normannorum et Regis Anglorum." In Historiæ Anglicanæ Circà Tempus Conquestûs Angliæ à Gulielmo Notho, Normannorum Duce, Selecta Monumenta. London: J. White.
- Round, John Horace (1930). Page, William (ed.). Family Origins and Other Studies. New York: R. R. Smith, Inc. ISBN 0-901-95128-5.
- William of Malmesbury (1904). William of Malmesbury's Chronicle of the Kings of England: from the Earliest Period to the Reign of King Stephen, with Notes and Illustrations. Translated by Giles, John Allen. London: Henry G. Bohn.
