= Richard de Grenville =

Anglo-Norman nobleman

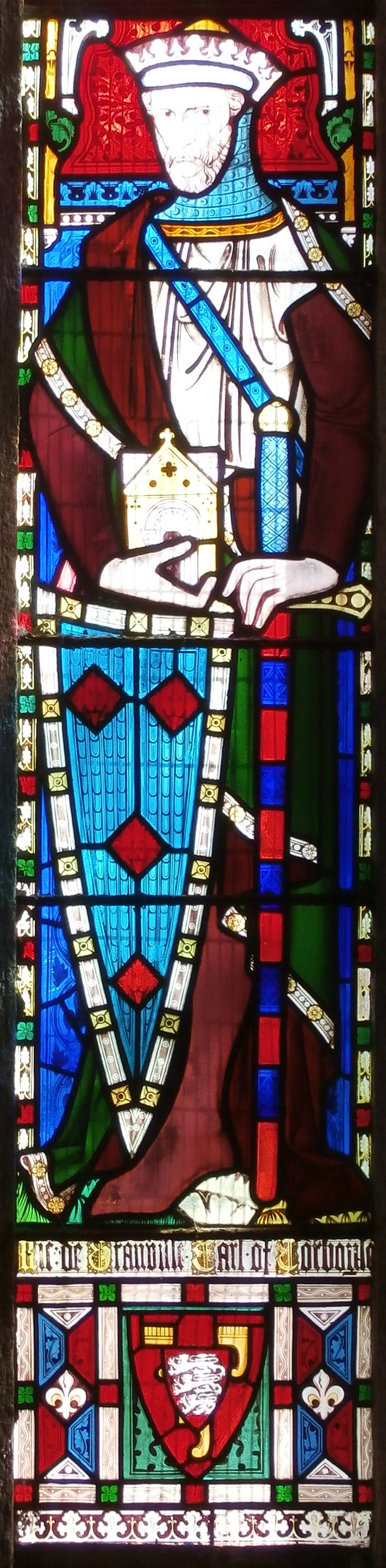
1860 imaginary stained-glass depiction of Richard de Grenville. Church of St James the Great, Kilkhampton, Cornwall.

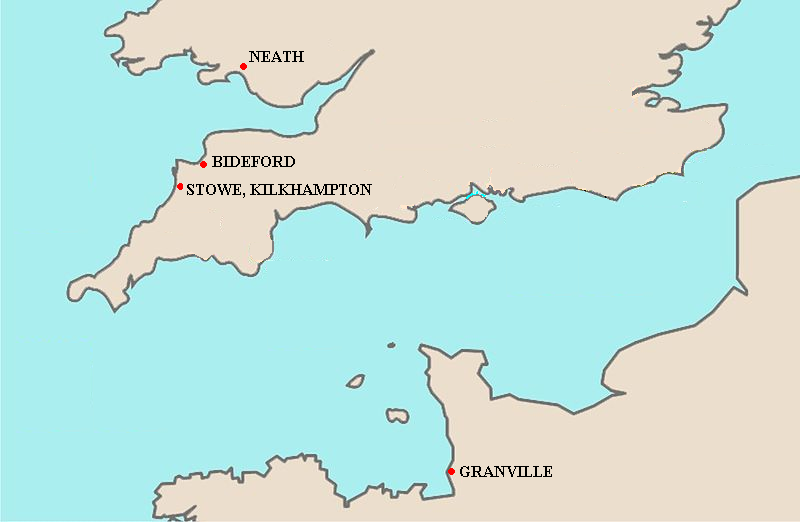
Historic seats of the Grenville family in Normandy (Granville, Manche), Glamorgan (Neath Castle), Devon (Bideford) & Cornwall (Stowe, Kilkhampton)

Sir Richard de Grenville (died after 1142) (alias de Grainvilla, de Greinvill, etc.) was one of the Twelve Knights of Glamorgan who served under Robert FitzHamon (died 1107), in the conquest of Glamorgan in Wales. He obtained from FitzHamon the lordship of Neath in which he built Neath Castle and in 1129 founded Neath Abbey. He is by tradition the founder and ancestor of the prominent Westcountry Grenville family of Stowe in the parish of Kilkhampton in Cornwall and of Bideford in Devon, the later head of which family was John Granville, 1st Earl of Bath (1628–1701). The surname of his supposed descendants the Westcountry Grenville family was spelled by tradition "Grenville" until 1661 when it was altered to "Granville".

== Lord of Neath ==
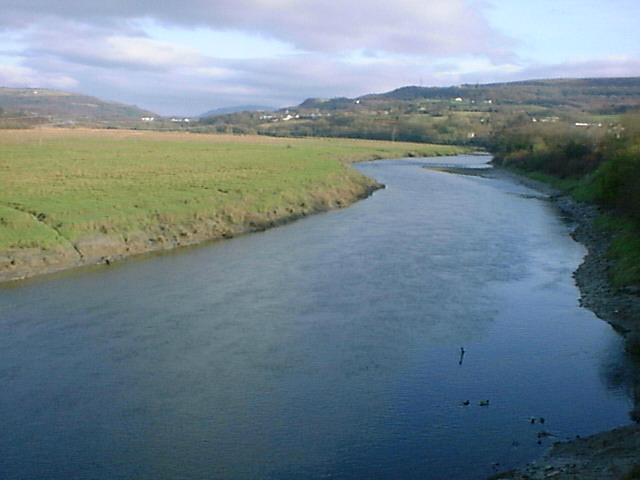
River Neath at Neath Castle, looking upstream

As his reward for his services during the conquest of Glamorgan his brother Robert FitzHamon allotted him the lordship of Neath, where Richard built Neath Castle. He is styled in one Glamorgan charter as "Constable of the Earl of Gloucester", thus of Robert, 1st Earl of Gloucester (died 1147), his brother's son-in-law and heir.

== Founds Neath Abbey ==
In 1129, Richard de Grenville founded Neath Abbey within his lordship as a daughter-house of the Benedictine Savigny Abbey near the village of Savigny-le-Vieux in western Normandy. Following the assumption of the Savigniac order into the Cistercian order in 1147, Neath Abbey also became a Cistercian house. To it he donated many of his lands, both in Wales and in Devon which he held from the Honour of Gloucester, including Littleham, near Bideford in North Devon. A later confirmation charter granted in 1207 by King John (1199–1216) to Neath Abbey confirmed to the monks the former grants of Richard de Grenville:

Johannes Deo Gratia etc. Sciatis nos dedisse et concessisse et presenti carta nostra confirmasse Deo et ecclesie sancte Trinitatis de Neth et monachis ibidem Deo servientibus locum ubi castellum Ricardi de Granavilla quondam fuit cum omnibus pertinentiis suis et totam terram quam idem Ricardus habuit inter Thawy et Neth, in bosco et plano cum omnibus partinentiis suis; habenda et tenenda in liberam puram et perpetuara elemosinam, quieta ab omni servicio sicut predictus Ricardus ea illis prius dedit et carta sua confirmavit. Salvis tenementis burgensium nostrorum de Neth...Datum per manum W. de Gray cancellarii nostri apud Wudestock, v. die Augusti, anno regni nostri ix. (John by the grace of God (king of England...other titles and styles)...Know ye all that we have given and conceded and by our present charter confirmed to God and to the Church of the Holy Trinity of Neath and to the monks there serving God the place where the castle of Richard de Grenville once was with all its appurtenances and all the land which the same Richard held between the (Rivers) Thawy and Neath, in wood and plain with all appurtenances. To have and to hold in pure and perpetual frankalmoinage, free from all service just as the foresaid Richard gave to them before and as his charter confirmed. Excepting our own burgage tenements in Neath. Given by the hand of W. de Gray our chancellor at Woodstock on the 5th day of August in our regnal year 9")

== Marriages and children ==
Richard de Grenville is thought to have married twice. Firstly, according to Ordericus Vitalis, to Isabel Giffard, the only daughter of Walter Giffard, 1st Earl of Buckingham (died 1102) and Lord of Longueville in Normandy, co-heiress with her aunt Rohesia (wife of Richard FitzGilbert, Lord of Clare) of the great possessions and lordships of the Giffard family. Grenville's second wife was a certain "Constance", mentioned as his wife in his foundation charter of Neath Abbey. She acted jointly with him in the founding of that Abbey, which suggested to Round that she may have been a native-born Welsh lady and the heiress of Neath. Granville (1895) suggested she was the daughter of Caradoc ap Arthur, Lord of Glyn Nedd. No surviving charter of his mentions any children and the fact that the lordship and castle of Neath escheated to the overlord the Earl of Gloucester and Lord of Glamorgan, the son-in-law and heir of Robert FitzHamon, suggested to Round that he left no children to inherit his possessions. Likewise, he held a few manors in Devon from the feudal barony of Gloucester, one of these being Naissa (Ash Reigny) which was re-granted after his death by the overlord to the de Reigny family. This evidence that the lands of Richard de Grenville did not descend to the later Westcountry Grenville family suggested to Round that though the latter family claimed to descend from the lord of Neath, this was not the case. (Note: Round, p. 138: "That Neath did not pass to his alleged descendants is an awkward fact". He calls the Grenville pedigree "a mendacious story" (p. 137).)

== Supposed titles ==
According to tradition and as confirmed retrospectively by the 1661 warrant of King Charles II, Richard de Grenville was claimed to have been the brother and heir male of Robert FitzHamon, who was supposed to have been Earl of Corboile and Lord of Thorigny and Granville in Normandy. Although FitzHamon's lands passed via his daughter Mabel FitzHamon (1090–1157) to her husband Robert, 1st Earl of Gloucester (died 1147) and to their descendants, FitzHamon's Norman titles were inexplicably claimed to have passed to his brother Richard de Grenville as his heir male; Round points out that in fact, under ancient Norman law, titles could indeed be inherited via female lines. It was from the 1661 royal warrant that the Granville family of Stowe and Bideford, who claimed to be descended from Richard, were granted licence to use these titles, even retrospectively on monuments they later erected to their ancestors. The titles were mere historical curiosities and carried no rights in the Peerage of Great Britain.

== Retirement and death ==
According to Round, Richard de Grenville died after June 1142. This deduction follows from his last being recorded as having signed (as Richard de Greinvill) a charter dated "probably June 1142" as a sworn pledge giver to Robert, 1st Earl of Gloucester, in his treaty of alliance with Miles, Earl of Hereford.

By tradition Richard de Grenville is said by Prince, (apparently following Fuller's Worthies) after he had founded Neath Abbey and bestowed upon it all his military acquisitions for its maintenance, to have "returned to his patrimony at Bideford where he lived in great honour and reputation the rest of his days". However, according to Round, no proof exists that Richard de Grenville ever held the manor of Bideford, which was later one of the principal seats of the Westcountry Grenville family. It was however, certainly one of the constituent manors of the Honour of Gloucester granted by King William Rufus to Robert FitzHamon." Richard de Grenville is known to have held seven knight's fees from the Honour of Gloucester, either granted to him by his brother FitzHamon or the latter's son-in-law and heir Robert, 1st Earl of Gloucester (1100–1147). Round supposes instead that the Grenvilles of Bideford and Stowe were descended from a certain "Robert de Grenville" (alias de Grainville, de Grainavilla, etc.) who was a junior witness to Richard's foundation charter of Neath Abbey and who in the 1166 Cartae Baronum return was listed as holding one knight's fee from the Earl of Gloucester, feudal baron of Gloucester. Robert's familial relationship, if any, to Richard is unknown.

A Grenville family pedigree dated 1639 stated that in his old age Richard undertook a pilgrimage to Jerusalem, in which city he died. This story appears to derive from the Gwentian Chronicle or Aberporgwm Brut, which adds that he brought back from the land of Canaan a man named Lalys who was "well-versed in the science of architecture, who erected monasteries, castles and churches" and who afterwards went to London as architect to King Henry I.

== 1860 depiction at Kilkhampton ==
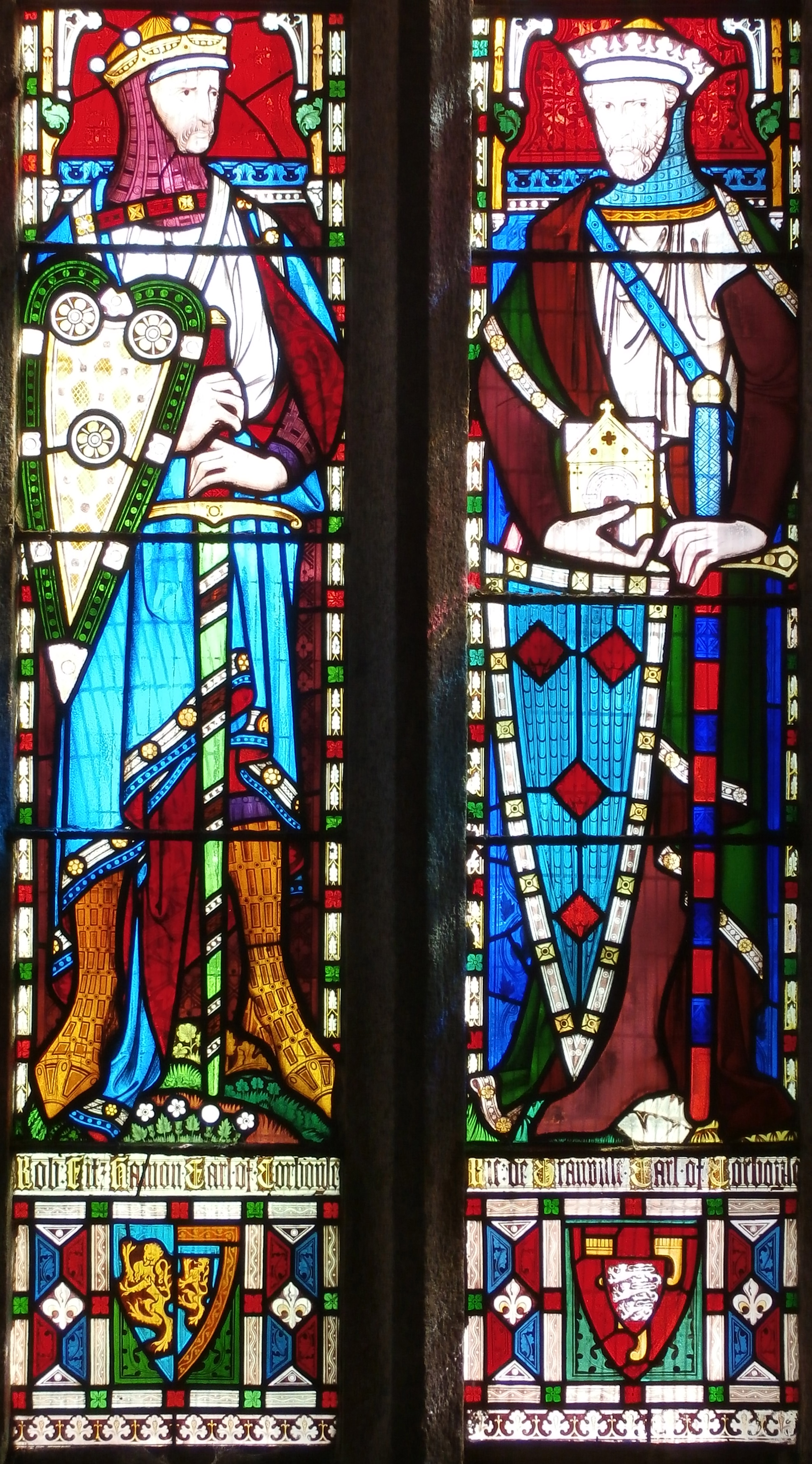
1860 imaginary depiction of Richard de Grenville (right) and his elder brother Robert FitzHamon (died 1107) (left), St James Church, Kilkhampton

An imaginary depiction of Richard de Grenville and his elder brother Robert FitzHamonZ is contained within one of the two Granville windows by Clayton and Bell erected in 1860 by supposed descendants of the former within the Granville Chapel in St James Church, Kilkhampton, Cornwall. The seat of the Grenville family ("Granville" after 1661 when elevated to the Earldom of Bath) was Stowe within the parish of Kilkhampton.

Below the left-hand figure is inscribed: "Rob. FitzHamon Earl of Corboyle", with attributed arms under showing: Azure, a lion rampant guardant or impaling Azure, a lion rampant or a bordure of the last. The right-hand figure is of Richard de Granville, the younger brother of Robert FitzHamon and one of the Twelve Knights of Glamorgan who followed his brother in effecting the conquest of Glamorgan. He holds in his hands the church of his foundation of Neath Abbey, Glamorgan. Below is inscribed: "Ric. de Granville Earl of Corboyle" with attributed arms under showing: Gules, three clarions or (the arms of the Grenvilles' later overlord and Robert FitzHamon's heir in the feudal barony of Gloucester, Richard de Clare, Earl of Gloucester, which arms were later adopted by the Grenvilles) with an inescutcheon of pretence of Gules, three lions passant argent. The Granvilles claimed in the 17th century to have been the heirs male of Robert FitzHamon (who left only a daughter as his sole heiress) in his supposed Earldom of Corboil.

The windows were erected in 1860 by the heirs of the Grenville family: George Granville Sutherland-Leveson-Gower, 2nd Duke of Sutherland KG (1786–1861); John Alexander Thynne, 4th Marquess of Bath (1831–1896); George Granville Francis Egerton, 2nd Earl of Ellesmere (1823–1862); Lord John Thynne (1798–1881), DD, Canon of Westminster, a younger son of Thomas Thynne, 2nd Marquess of Bath (1765–1837), KG.

== Sources ==
- Granville, Rev. Roger, Rector of Bideford, History of the Granville Family traced back to Rollo First Duke of Normandy, with pedigrees etc., Exeter, 1895
- Round, J. Horace, Family Origins and Other Studies, London, 1930, The Granvilles and the Monks, pp. 130–169
