= Hamo Dapifer =

Anglo-Norman royal official

Hamo Dapifer (died c. 1100) (alias Haimo) was an Anglo-Norman royal official under both King William I of England (r. 1066–1087) and his son King William II of England (r. 1087–1100). He held the office, from which his epithet derives, known in Latin as dapifer and in French seneschal, in English "steward", as well as the office of Sheriff of Kent.

== Origins ==
Hamo was the son of Hamon Dentatus, a Norman noble who held the lordship of Torigni-sur-Vire near Manche in Normandy. Hamon Dentatus rebelled against Duke William, later William the Conqueror, and died in about 1047.

== Career ==
Hamo was steward to both King William I and his son King William II. He was acting as royal steward by 1069. Hamo was appointed to the office of Sheriff of Kent in 1077 and held it until his death.

During the reign of William II, Hamo was one of five known stewards, the others being Eudo Dapifer, Eudo's brother Hubert of Ryes, Roger Bigod, 1st Earl of Norfolk, and Ivo Taillebois.

The historian Emma Mason suggests that Hamo, along with Ranulf Flambard, Urse d'Abetot, Robert FitzHamon (Hamo's son), Roger Bigod and Eudo Dapifer, were the first recognisable Barons of the Exchequer under William II. These men were often associated together as royal officials in government and jointly witnessed documents. Hamo witnessed six writs of William II. Hamo's involvement in the higher levels of government dates especially from King William II's absence from England in the late 1090s. In 1099, when William II was in Normandy, Hamo was one of the main assistants to Flambard, who had been left as regent of England in the king's absence.

According to Domesday Book, Hamo held lands in Kent, Surrey, and Essex, his estates in Essex being larger than those in the other two counties.

Hamo was still witnessing royal documents in September 1099, and was one of the witnesses to the letter which King Henry I (1100–1135), William II's brother and successor, wrote to Anselm, Archbishop of Canterbury, shortly after his accession. Hamo died shortly after witnessing these documents.

== Family ==
Hamo had two sons, Hamo, who became sheriff after him, and Robert Fitzhamon. Robert was probably the elder, as he received his father's lands in Normandy after Hamo's death. The younger Hamo received the English lands.

== Sources ==
- Barlow, Frank (1983). William Rufus. Berkeley: University of California Press. ISBN 0-520-04936-5.
- Douglas, David C. (1964). William the Conqueror: The Norman Impact Upon England. Berkeley, CA: University of California Press.
- Green, Judith A. (2004). "Robert fitz Haimon (d. 1107)". Oxford Dictionary of National Biography. Oxford University Press. doi:10.1093/ref:odnb/9596. (subscription, Wikipedia Library access or UK public library membership required)
- Hollister, C. Warren (2001). Frost, Amanda Clark (ed.). Henry I. New Haven, CT: Yale University Press. ISBN 0-300-08858-2.
- Keats-Rohan, K. S. B. (1999). Domesday People: A Prosopography of Persons Occurring in English Documents, 1066–1166: Domesday Book. Ipswich, UK: Boydell Press. ISBN 0-85115-722-X.
- Mason, Emma (2005). William II: Rufus, the Red King. Stroud, UK: Tempus. ISBN 0-7524-3528-0.
