= Morgan Gam =

Welsh lord of Afan

Morgan Gam (died February 1241) was a Welsh lord of Afan, a small Welsh lordship in Glamorgan.

== Origin ==
Morgan Gam was a younger son of Morgan ap Caradog and presumably Gwenllian, a daughter of Ifor Bach. After the death of his older brother Lleision, he became lord of Afan in 1213, which stretched across the hill country between River Afan and River Neath. As head of the oldest line of the descendants of Iestyn ap Gwrgan, he claimed supremacy over the neighbouring Welsh lords of Meisgyn and Glynrhondda.

== Life ==
Both Morgan's father and brother had been loyal supporters of the English king John after he had handed Newcastle Castle over to Morgan ap Caradog in 1189. After his brother Lleision's death Morgan Gam did not inherit the castle. Instead King John gave it to his first wife, Isabella, Countess of Gloucester, after their marriage had been annulled. Morgan Gam tried to regain possession of the castle throughout his life. In the fight against Gilbert de Clare, who was the heir of Isabella and thus in 1217 came into the possession of Newcastle as Lord of Glamorgan, he was supported by his relative Morgan ab Owain from Glynrhondda, who attacked Margam Abbey in 1224. Over the next few years, Morgan Gam raided other English settlements, including Laleston, St Nicholas and Newcastle in 1226. Nevertheless, he could not enforce his claims, but he received increasing support from Prince Llywelyn the Great of Gwynedd, who wanted to expand his influence in Glamorgan. In 1228 Gilbert de Clare undertook a campaign in the mountains of Glamorgan, during which he was able to capture Morgan Gam. Morgan was taken to Clare Castle in eastern England and did not regain his freedom until the hostages were released in 1229. After his release, Morgan Gam allied again with Llywelyn the Great and destroyed Neath Castle in 1231 during the Anglo-Welsh War. In the following year he attacked the castle and settlement of Kenfig, but failed to capture the keep of the castle. In 1233 he supported together with Llywelyn the Great a failed revolt of Richard Marshal, 3rd Earl of Pembroke against the English King Henry III. With the support of the Anglo-Norman lords of Glamorgan, Richard Marshal had occupied Glamorgan during this rebellion, leading to the unusual situation when Morgan Gam and the other Welsh lords of Glamorgan became allies of the Anglo-Norman lords. Marshal promised the native Welsh rulers parts of Glamorgan as a reward. When the rebellion failed, Richard Siward, the new royal administrator of Glamorgan, demanded the return of these areas. Morgan Gam refused to return the territories taken until Llywelyn the Great convinced Morgan Gam to concede.

== Family and issue ==
Morgan Gam was married twice, first to Janes ferch Elidyr Ddu and second to Ellen, daughter of Gronw ap Einion. He had at least three sons, including:

- Lleision (died before 1262)
- Morgan Fychan (died 1288)

He was buried in Margam Abbey. His heir was first his son Lleision, after his death his younger son Morgan Fychan.

== Further sources ==
- Thomas Jones Pierce: Morgan Gam (Dictionary of Welsh Biography, National Library of Wales)

== Sources ==
- Altschul, Michael (1965). A Baronial Family in Medieval England: The Clares. The Johns Hopkins Press.
