= Brictric =

Landowner in 11th century England

Brictric was a powerful English thane whose many English landholdings, mostly in the West Country, are recorded in the Domesday Book of 1086.

== Life ==
According to the account by the Continuator of Wace and others, in his youth Brictric declined the romantic advances of Matilda of Flanders (c. 1031 – 1083), later wife of King William the Conqueror, and his great fiefdom was thereupon seized by her. Whatever the truth of the matter, years later when she was ruling England as regent, she used her authority to confiscate Brictric's lands and threw him into prison, where he died.

Samuel Lysons in his Magna Britannia refers to a Godeva as being the "widow of Brictric, in dower" of two manors in Devon in a footnote to his table of the general division of property at the time of the Domesday survey.

Brictric's other lands were granted after Matilda's death in 1083 by her eldest son King William Rufus (1087–1100) to Robert FitzHamon (died 1107), the conqueror of Glamorgan, whose daughter and sole heiress Maud (or Mabel) FitzHamon brought them to her husband Robert de Caen, 1st Earl of Gloucester (pre-1100 – 1147), a natural son of Matilda's younger son King Henry I (1100–1135). Thus Brictric's fiefdom became the feudal barony of Gloucester.

== Landholdings ==
Brictric held manors in several counties in the West Country and elsewhere in England. In the Domesday Book he is rarely named in full as "Son of Algar", and thus references to plain "Brictric" cannot be assumed to relate to him unless suggested by circumstantial evidence, namely the manor's subsequent descent to Queen Matilda and/or to the feudal barony of Gloucester. The feudal barony of Gloucester was one of the largest in the kingdom, and in the Cartae Baronum return of 1166 comprised 279 knight's fees, or separate manors.

=== In Devon ===
Brictric's certain landholdings in Devon are listed in the Domesday Book consecutively within the first chapter Terra Regis ("Land of the King") under the Latin heading: Infra scriptas terras tenuit Brictric post Regina Mathildis ("Below are written the lands Brictric held, later Queen Matilda") and comprise the following:

- Northlew (Levia)
- Halwill (Halgewelle)
- Clovelly (Clovelie)
- Bideford (Bedeford)
- Littleham (Liteham)
- Langtree (Langetrev)
- Iddesleigh (Edeslege)
- Winkleigh (Wincheleie)
- Ashreigney (Aisse)
- Lapford (Slapeford)
- High Bickington (Bichentone)
- Morchard Bishop (Morchet)
- Holcombe Burnell (Holecu_be)
- Halberton (Halsbretone)
- Ashprington (Aisbertone)
