= St James Church, Kilkhampton =

Church in Kilkhampton, Cornwall

St James Church
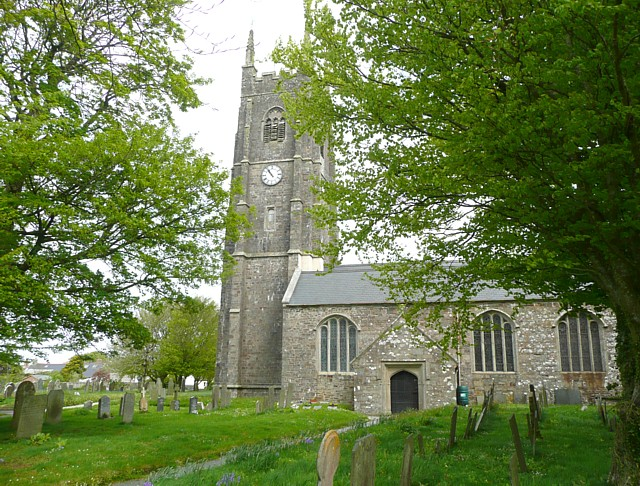
- St James Church
- 50.875053°N 4.485023°W
- Location: Kilkhampton
- Country: England
- Denomination: Church of England

Administration
- Diocese: Truro
- Archdeaconry: Bodmin
- Deanery: Stratton

The St James Church, Kilkhampton is a Grade I listed parish church in Kilkhampton, Cornwall, England. The building originated in the 12th century and underwent major renovations in the late 15th and early 16th centuries. It is notable for its extensive set of 16th-century benches and its historic font.

== History ==
The church, dedicated to St James the Great, dates to the 12th century, with a Romanesque inner south doorway, surviving from an earlier structure. The present building was mostly rebuilt in the late 15th or early 16th century in the Perpendicular style, including the nave, aisles, roofs, west tower, and vestry. A south porch dated 1567 was constructed for John Grenville, and the east end was rebuilt in 1860. The architect was Sir George Gilbert Scott.

The church was designated a Grade I listed building in 1961.

== Architecture ==
=== Structure and fabric ===
The church is built of slatestone ashlar with granite dressings and slate roofs. The three-stage west tower is tall and battlemented, with set-back buttresses, moulded string courses, pinnacles, and Perpendicular windows and belfry openings. The aisles contain mostly uncusped Perpendicular windows, some restored in the 19th century, while the deeply recessed east window dates from 1860. The south porch bears the inscription Porta cell 1567 and features carved armorial decoration associated with the Grenville family.

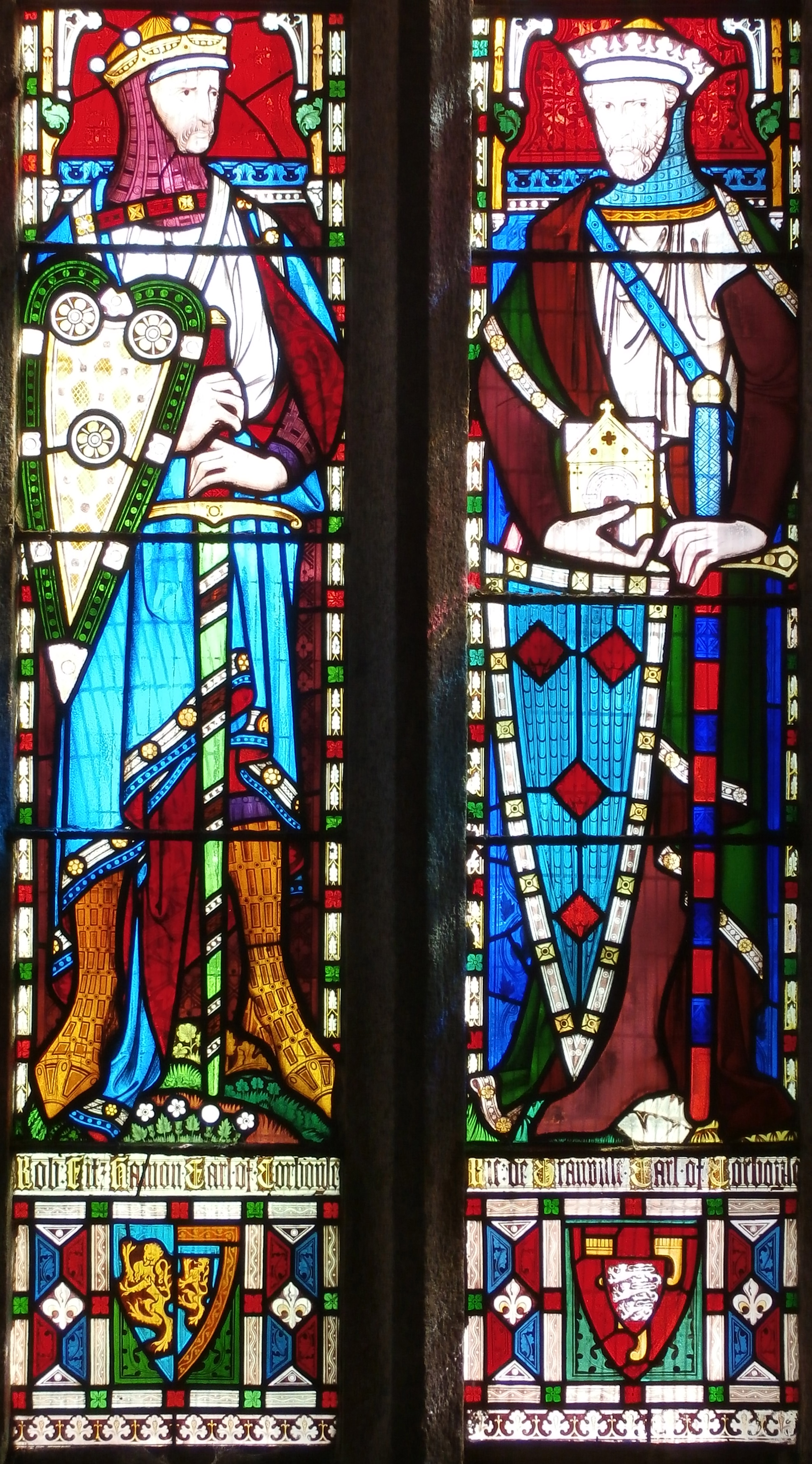
Depiction of Robert Fitzhamon and Richard de Grenville

The Romanesque south doorway, described as among the finest in Cornwallis is of four orders and may not be in its original position, as the Norman aisle would have been narrower than the present structure; it may have originally stood at the west end of the church.

=== Interior ===
The interior has tall seven-bay Perpendicular arcades and wagon roofs with carved ribs and bosses, the chancel roof is set slightly lower and decorated with carved angels. A rood-stair turret survives, and the church preserves an extensive series of 16th-century benches with carved ends depicting religious symbols, heraldry, Renaissance ornament, and other motifs. The aisled interior is unusually high for Cornwall, with three wagon roofs extending its full length. The chancel is Victorian and much of the stained glass dates from the Victorian period.

=== Monuments, glass and fittings ===
The church contains several wall monuments, some attributed to local sculptor, Michael Chuke, said to have been a pupil of Grinling Gibbons. These include memorials to the Revd John Coryndon (d. 1711), Sir Bevill Grenville and Algernon Carteret Thynne (d. 1917). Many of the monuments have been repainted. The interior also retains the Royal Arms of George II and heraldic decoration connected with the Grenville family. Much of the 19th-century stained glass is by Clayton and Bell, including the east window of 1860, and the organ incorporates 19th-century pipework rebuilt in 1958.

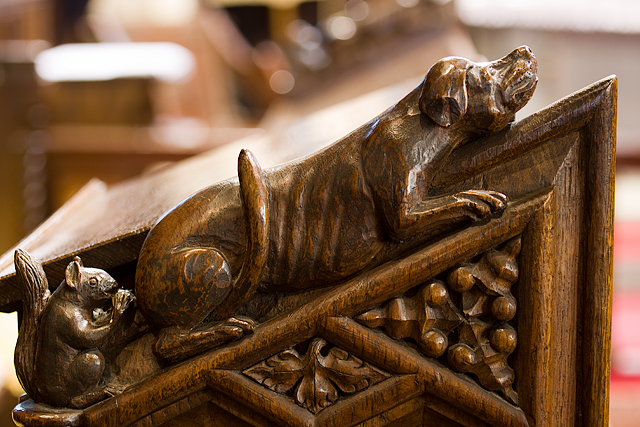
Bench end detail, St James

The 16th-century granite font has an octagonal bowl with an unusual inscription in inverted Lombardic lettering.

==== Bench ends ====
There are 157 bench ends. produced during a mid 16th-century rebuilding associated with the Grenville family. The benches survive complete and are darkened with age, each appearing to have been carved from a single block of wood, including the prayer–book shelves. Their carving is considered cruder than the bench ends at nearby St Swithin's Church at Launcells and includes themes such as the Instruments of the Passion, heraldic emblems, mermaids, tools of trades, grotesques, and scrollwork. These benches represent the earliest fixed seating in the church.

== Churchyard ==
The surrounding churchyard contains several late 18th and early 19th-century slate headstones bearing inscribed verses.
