= Robert Fitzhamon =

12th-century Norman noble

Robert FitzHamon
- Predecessor: Hamo Dapifer
- Successor: Richard de Grenville
- Born: c. 1045–1055
- Died: March 1107
- Spouse: Sybil de Montgomery (Sybil de Montgomerie)
- Issue: Mabel FitzRobert, Countess of Gloucester; Hawisa
- Father: Hamo Dapifer

Robert Fitzhamon (c.1045–1055 – March 1107), or Robert FitzHamon (literally, "Robert, son of Hamon"), Seigneur de Creully in the Calvados region and Torigny in the Manche region of Normandy, was the first Norman feudal baron of Gloucester and the Norman conqueror of Glamorgan, southern Wales. He became Lord of Glamorgan in 1075.

As a kinsman of the Conqueror and one of the few Anglo-Norman barons to remain loyal to the kings William Rufus and Henry I of England, he was a prominent figure in England and Normandy.

== Life ==
=== Parentage and ancestry ===
Robert FitzHamon, probably born in the 1040s or 1050s, was the son of Hamo Dapifer, the Sheriff of Kent, and the grandson of Hamon Dentatus ("the Betoothed" or "Toothy", i.e., probably buck-toothed). His grandfather held the lordships of Torigny, Creully, Mézy, and Évrecy in Normandy; however, following his death at the Battle of Val-ès-Dunes in 1047, the family may have lost these lordships. FitzHamon is said to have been a relative of William the Conqueror, but the exact nature of this relationship is unknown.

== Career in England and Wales ==
Few details of Robert's career prior to 1087 are available. Robert probably did not fight at the Battle of Hastings in 1066, and does not appear in the Domesday Book of 1086, although some of his relatives are listed therein. He first comes to prominence in surviving records as a supporter of King William Rufus (1087–1100) during the Rebellion of 1088. After the revolt was defeated he was granted as a reward by King William Rufus the feudal barony of Gloucester consisting of over two hundred manors in Gloucestershire and other counties. Some of these had belonged to the late Queen Matilda, consort of William the Conqueror and mother of William Rufus, and had been seized by her from the great Saxon thane Brictric son of Algar, apparently as a punishment for his having refused her romantic advances in his youth. They had been destined as the inheritance of Rufus's younger brother Henry (the future King Henry I); nevertheless Fitzhamon remained on good terms with Henry.

== Conquest of Glamorgan ==
The chronology of Robert's conquest of Glamorgan is uncertain, but it probably took place in the decades after he received the feudal barony of Gloucester. One explanation is the legend of the Twelve Knights of Glamorgan, which dates from the 16th century, in which the Welsh Prince Iestyn ap Gwrgan (Jestin), prince or Lord of Glamorgan, supposedly called in the assistance of Robert Fitzhamon. Fitzhamon and his Norman knights and defeated the prince of South Wales Rhys ap Tewdwr in battle in 1090. As reward Robert took possession of Glamorgan, and "the French came into Dyfed and Ceredigion, which they have still retained, and fortified the castles, and seized upon all the land of the Britons." Iestyn did not profit long by his involvement with the Normans. He was soon defeated and his lands taken in 1091. Whether there is any truth in the legend or not Robert Fitzhamon seems to have seized control of the lowlands of Glamorgan and Gwynllwg sometime from around 1089 to 1094. His key strongholds were Cardiff Castle, which already may have been built, on the site of an old Roman fort, new castles at Newport, and at Kenfig. His descendants would inherit these castles and lands.

== Founder of Tewkesbury Abbey (1087) ==
Robert FitzHamon refounded Tewkesbury Abbey in 1087. The abbey's dimensions are almost the same as Westminster Abbey. The first abbot was Giraldus, Abbot of Cranborne (d. 1110), who died before the abbey was consecrated in October 1121. The abbey was apparently built under the influence of Robert's wife, Sybil de Montgomery (or de Montgomerie).

== Fitzhamon and his kings ==
Legend has it that Robert had ominous dreams in the days before Rufus' fatal hunting expedition, which postponed but did not prevent the outing. He was one of the first to gather in tears around Rufus' corpse, and he used his cloak to cover the late king's body on its journey to be buried in Winchester. How much of these stories are the invention of later days is unknown. In any case Fitzhamon proved as loyal to Henry I as he had been to his predecessor, remaining on Henry's side in the several open conflicts with Henry's brother Robert Curthose. He was one of the three barons who negotiated the 1101 truce between Henry I and Robert Curthose.

In 1105 he went to Normandy and was captured while fighting near his ancestral estates near Bayeux. This was one of the reasons Henry crossed the channel with a substantial force later that year. Fitzhamon was freed, and joined Henry's campaign, which proceeded to besiege Falaise. There Fitzhamon was severely injured in the head; although he lived two more years he was never the same mentally. He was buried in the Chapter House at Tewkesbury Abbey, which he had founded and considerably enriched during his lifetime.

== Marriage and progeny ==
Between 1087 and 1090, Robert Fitzhamon married Sybil, apparently the youngest daughter of Roger of Montgomery, 1st Earl of Shrewsbury by his first wife, Mabel Talvas, daughter of William I Talvas. She survived her husband and is said to have entered a convent with two of her daughters.

By his wife, Robert Fitzhamon is said to have had four daughters including:

- Mabel, eldest daughter, who inherited his great estates and in 1119 married Robert de Caen, 1st Earl of Gloucester, a natural son of King Henry I (1100–1135). Fitzhamon's huge land-holdings in several counties formed the feudal barony of Gloucester which was inherited by his son-in-law Robert de Caen, who, in 1122, was created 1st Earl of Gloucester. Robert Fitzhamon's great-granddaughter, Isabel of Gloucester married King John (1199–1216).
- Isabella (or Hawisa), said to have married a count from Brittany, but no further details exist.

== 1860 Depiction at Kilkhampton ==
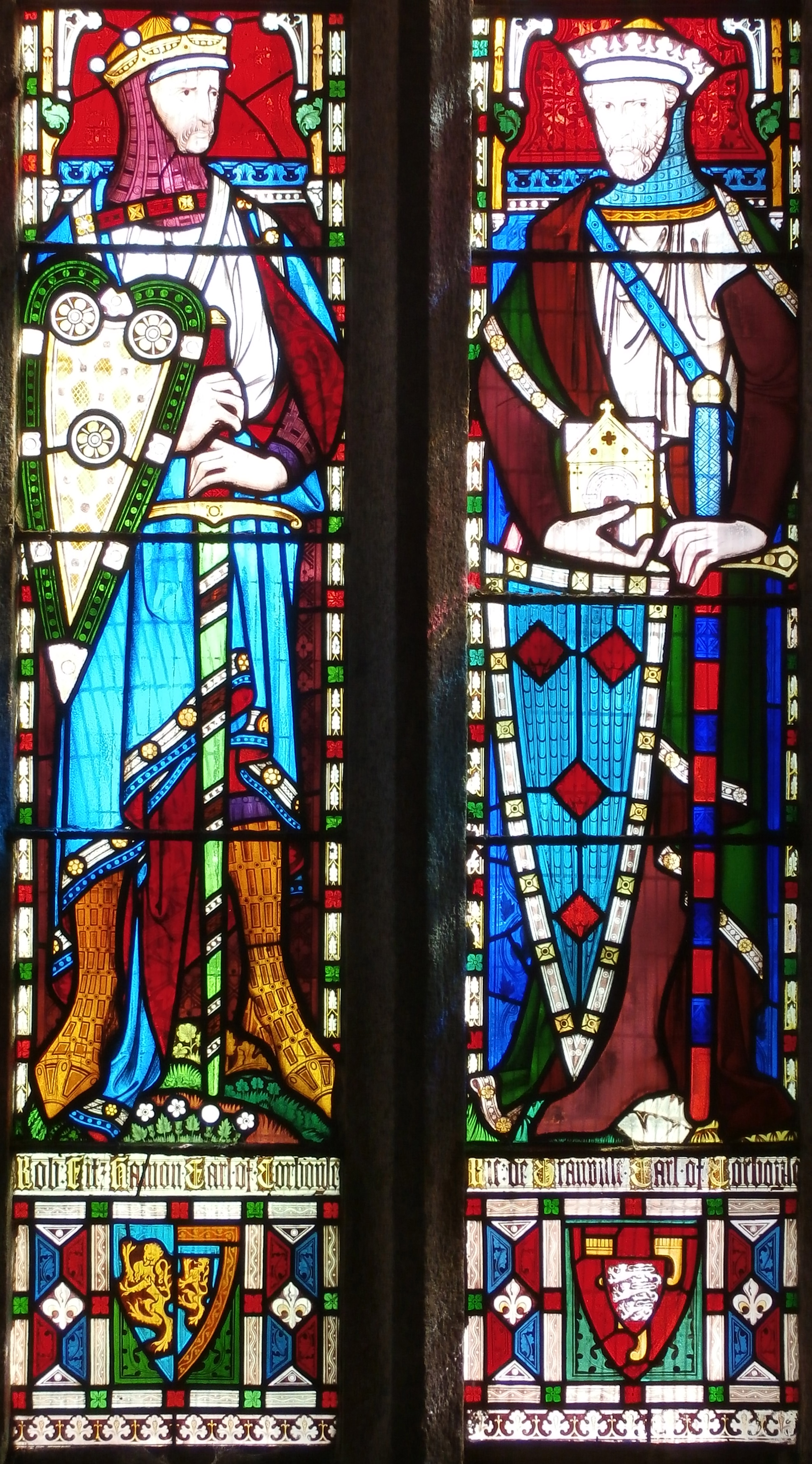
1860 imaginary depiction of Robert FitzHamon (d. 1107) (left) and his younger brother Richard I de Grenville (d. post 1142) (right), Church of St James the Great, Kilkhampton, Cornwall

A depiction of Robert FitzHamon (d. 1107) and Richard I de Grenville (d. post 1142) is contained within one of the two Granville windows by Clayton and Bell erected in 1860 by descendants of the latter within the Granville Chapel at St James Church, Kilkhampton, Cornwall. The Granvilles claimed in the 17th century to have been the heirs male of Robert FitzHamon to a non-existent Earldom of Corboil, a connection without historical foundation. The seat of the Grenville family ("Granville" after 1661 when elevated to the Earldom of Bath) was Stowe within the parish of Kilkhampton. Below the left-hand figure is inscribed: "Rob. FitzHamon Earl of Corboyle", with attributed arms under showing: Azure, a lion rampant guardant or impaling Azure, a lion rampant or a bordure of the last. The windows were erected in 1860 by the heirs of the Grenville family.
