= Clarion (heraldry) =

Rare charge in heraldry

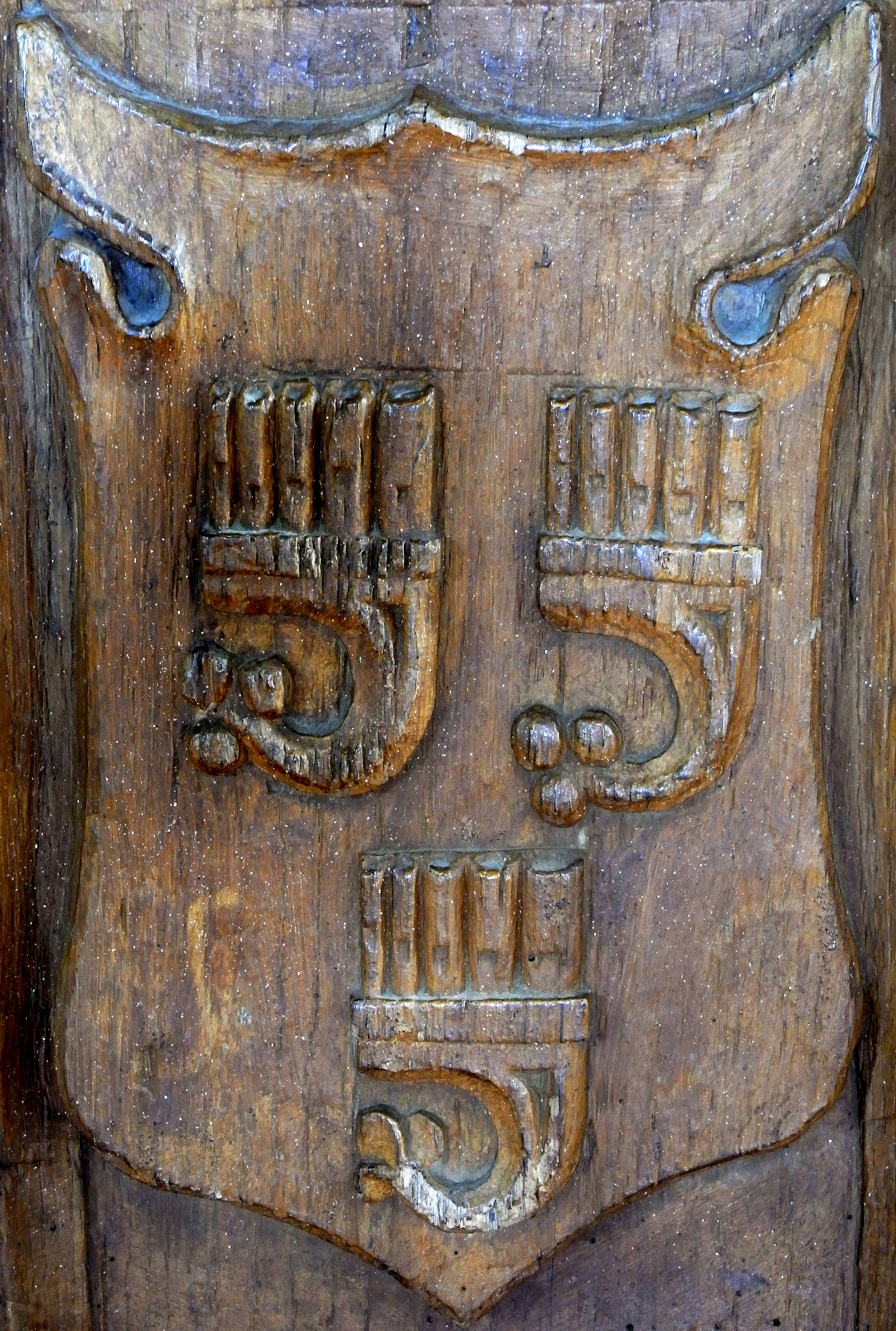
Clarions depicted in the coat of arms of Grenville, a mid-16th century carving which clearly shows the labium openings in the pipes. Musical possibilities include panpipes, recorders and the pipe organ. Artwork is from a bench end in Sutcombe Church, Devon

The clarion (also rest or sufflue) is a rare charge in heraldry of uncertain meaning and purpose. It originates from England and is still largely exclusive to that country, though latterly it has been imported to other Anglophone nations. In Canadian heraldry, it is the cadency mark of a ninth daughter.

It is generally said to represent a kind of wind instrument such as a panpipe or recorder, but does not resemble the trumpet-like clarion known to modern musicians. It may also be intended as an overhead view of a keyboard instrument such as a spinet. Alternatively it has been said to represent a 'rest', a device used by mediaeval knights to support a lance during jousting. In his Display of Heraldry John Guillim suggests that it may be a rudder. 'Clarion' is also the name given to a stop on an organ which imitates the sound of a trumpet.

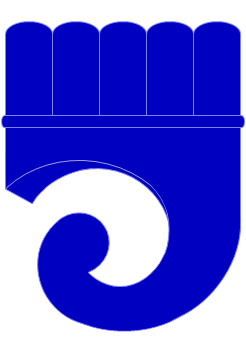
Depiction of a heraldic clarion

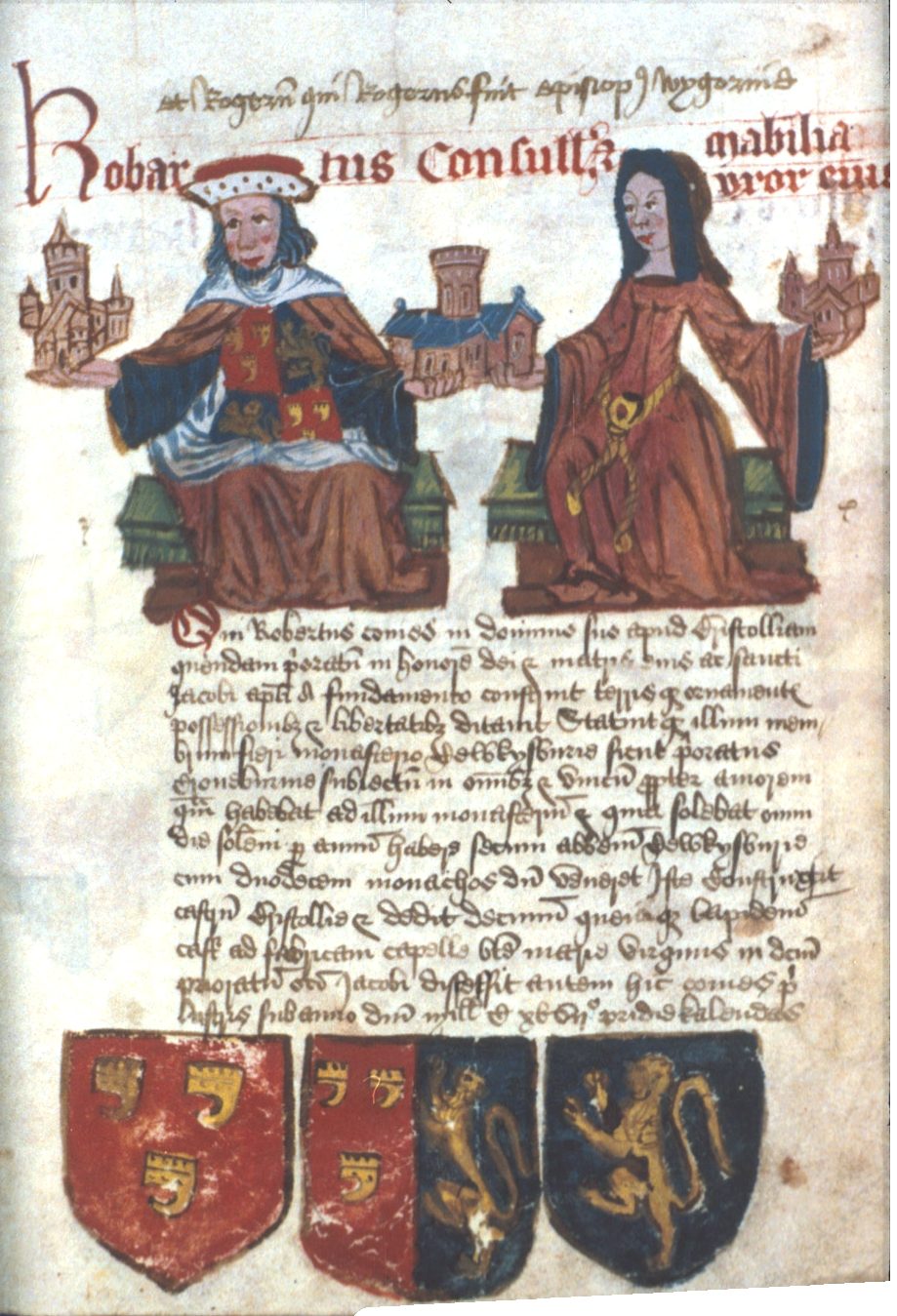
Arms of Robert, 1st Earl of Gloucester (1090–1147) in the Tewkesbury Abbey Founder's Book, with three clarions

Coat of arms of American president Chester A. Arthur, based on the Arthur arms of England: Gules a chevron argent between three clarions or.

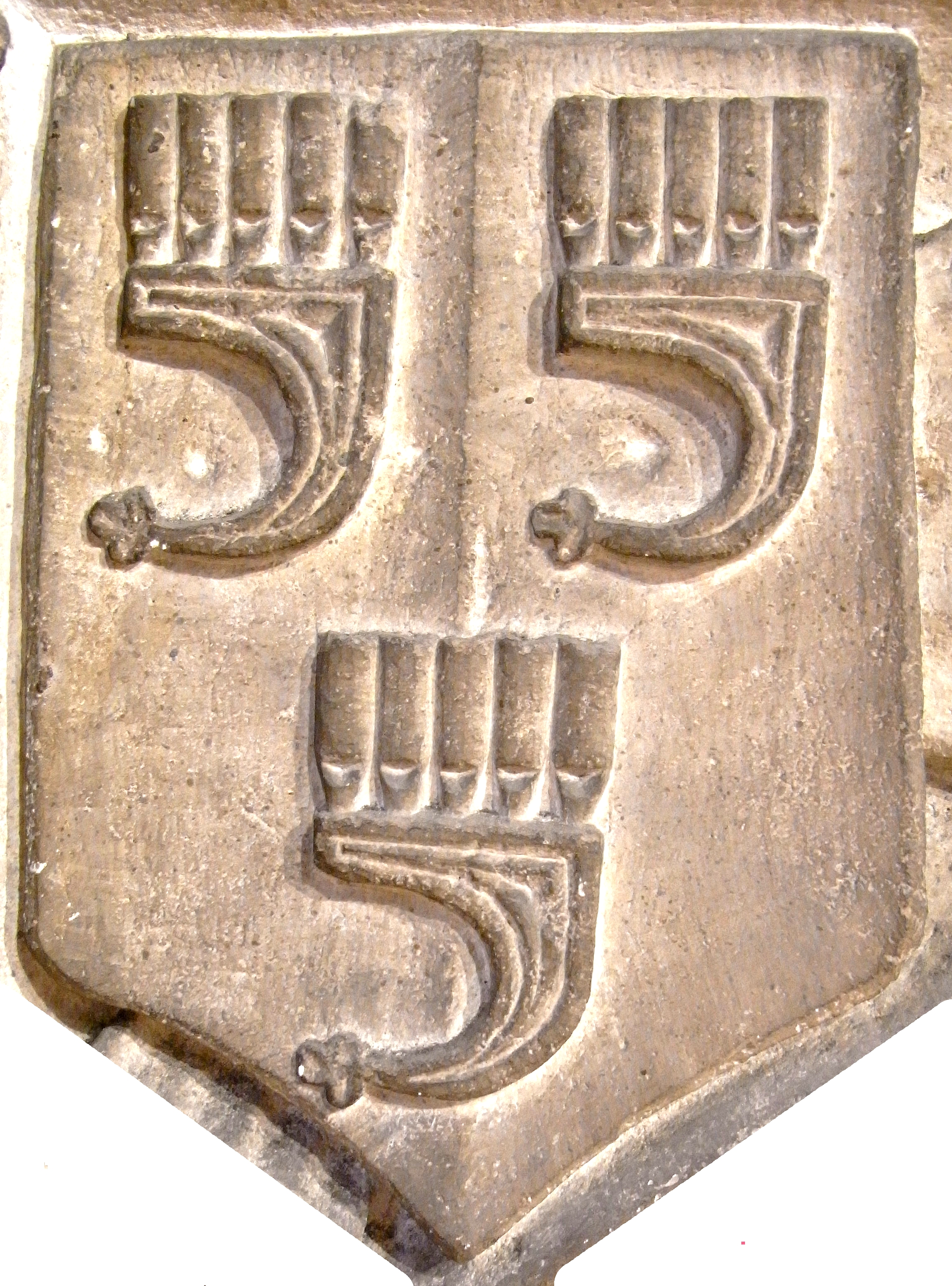
Thomas Grenville arms, Bideford church, Devon

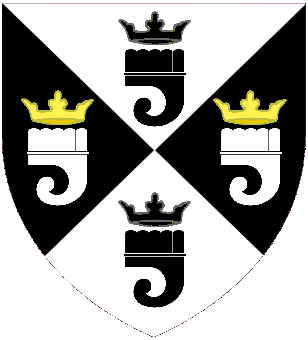
Arms of Michael Jay, Baron Jay of Ewelme: Per saltire argent and sable two clarions in pale each ensigned with an ancient crown sable and two clarions in fess argent each ensigned by an ancient crown or

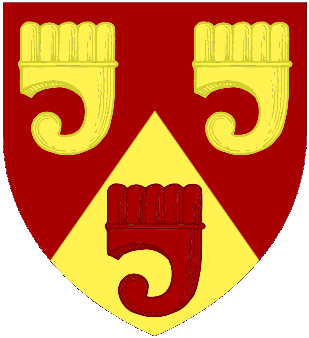
Arms of Paul Mealor

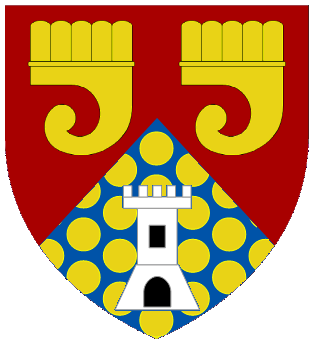
Hanley Economic Building Society: Per chevron gules and azure bezanty in chief two clarions or and in base a tower argent
