= Neath Castle =

Castle in Neath, Wales

Coordinates: 51.6651°N 3.8037°W

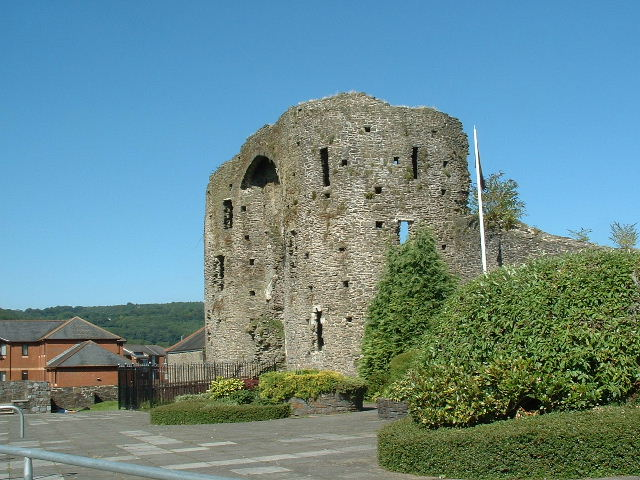
Neath Castle

Neath Castle (Welsh: Castell Nedd) is a Norman castle located in the town centre of Neath, Wales. Its construction was begun by Robert, Earl of Gloucester, the nominal Lord of Glamorgan, at a date estimated between 1114 and 1130. It is also referred to as "Granville's Castle", after Richard I de Grenville (or Granville or Glanville; died post 1142), Lord of Neath, who has also been credited with its construction. The town of Neath takes its Welsh name, "Castell-nedd", from the castle.

== History ==
The first castle in Neath was located west of the river near the Roman fort of Nidum, and was a timber fortification in a motte and bailey structure. When Richard de Grenville founded Neath Abbey close by, he abandoned this original castle, and it may have been used by the monks as a source of building material.

A second castle on the opposite bank of the river, in what is now the centre of the town, is first documented in 1183; shortly afterwards, William de Cogan, son of Miles de Cogan, was appointed constable. This second castle was built by Gilbert de Clare, 5th Earl of Gloucester. During the 13th century, being a Norman stronghold, it was subject to attack by the Welsh, notably by Llywelyn the Great, who captured it in 1231 with help from a local Welsh lord, Morgan Gam. Following this, it was substantially rebuilt by Richard de Clare, 6th Earl of Gloucester, Gilbert's son.

It was taken again, and this time destroyed, by Humphrey de Bohun, 4th Earl of Hereford, in 1321, during the rebellion against King Edward II of England. Its owner, Hugh Despenser the Younger (who had gained the lordship through his marriage to the heiress Eleanor de Clare), rebuilt it, possibly with the addition of a gatehouse. In 1376, one Roger Kyngot was the constable, and the castle was rebuilt in stone in 1377; that is probably when the great gatehouse was built, which is the main surviving feature. The castle was in use until the 17th century, and has been a recreational area for the town since the 18th century. The post of "Constable of Neath Castle", a medieval legacy, was held by Sir Humphrey Mackworth from 1703. The title was eventually absorbed into that of Mayor of Neath. What remains of the castle is designated a Grade II* listed building.

== See also ==
- List of castles in Wales
- Castles in Great Britain and Ireland
- List of Scheduled Monuments in Neath Port Talbot

== Gallery ==
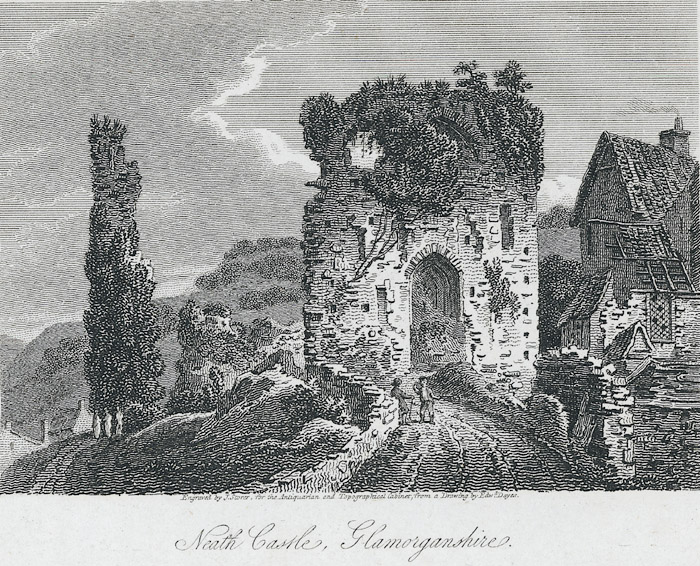
Neath Castle, 1807, by artist Edward Dayes, 1763–1804, and engraver J. Storer, 1771-1837

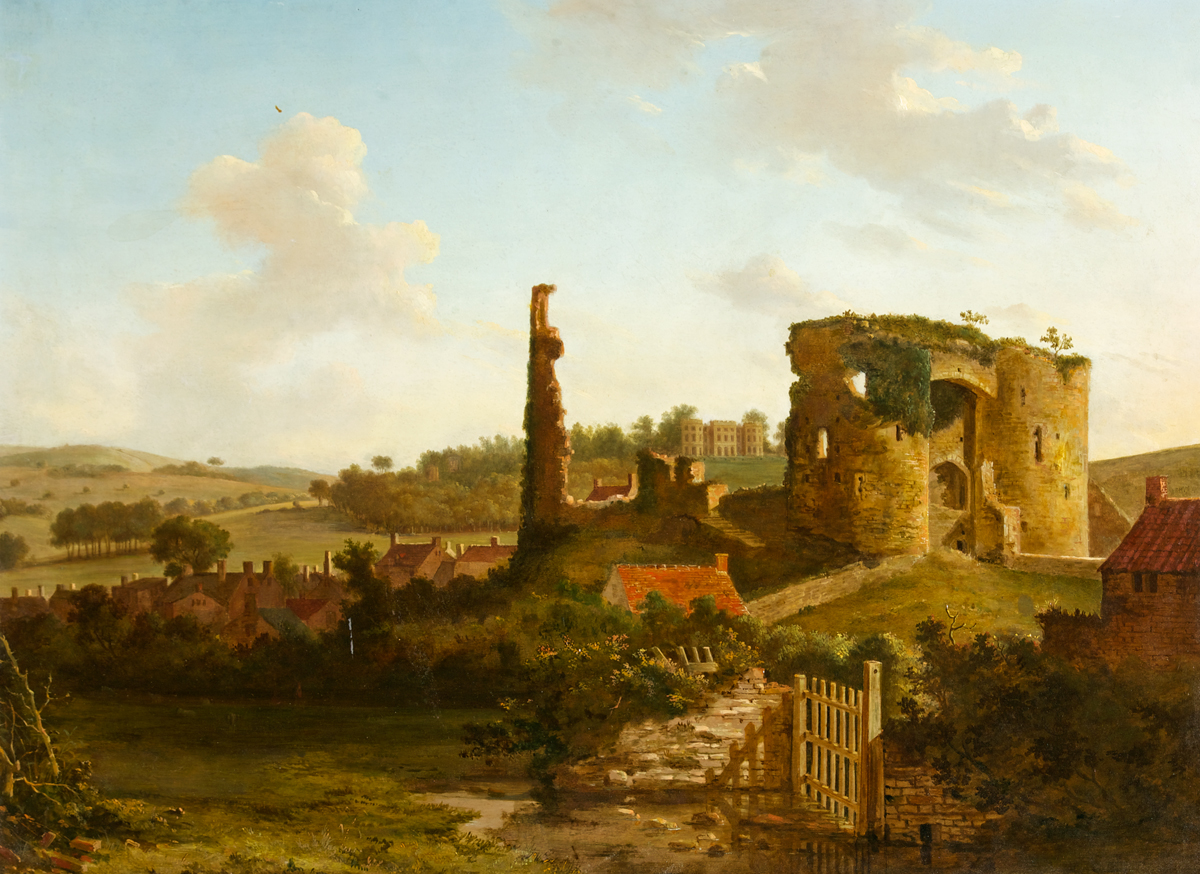
The Gnoll and Castle, Neath, 1790-1810 by Hendrik Frans de Cort

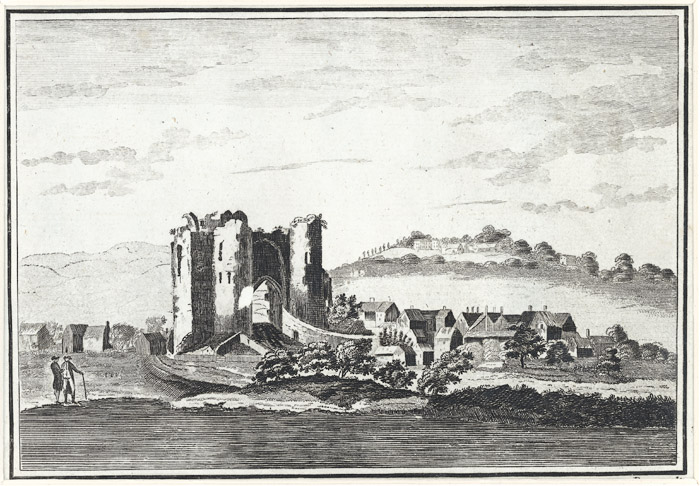
Neath Castle ca 1790, by Page

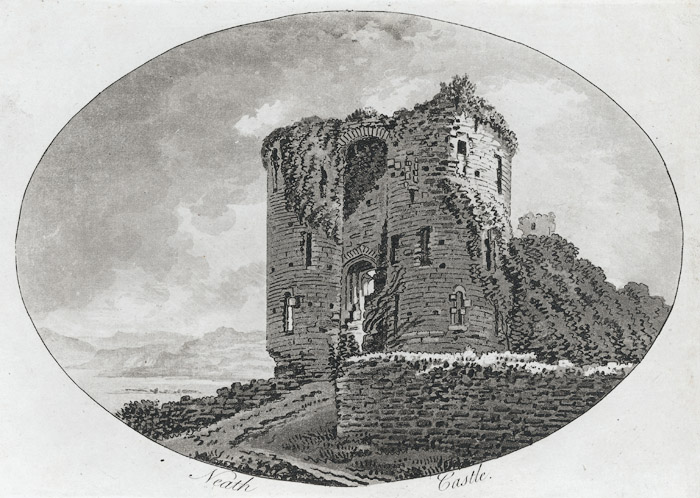
Neath Castle ca 1790

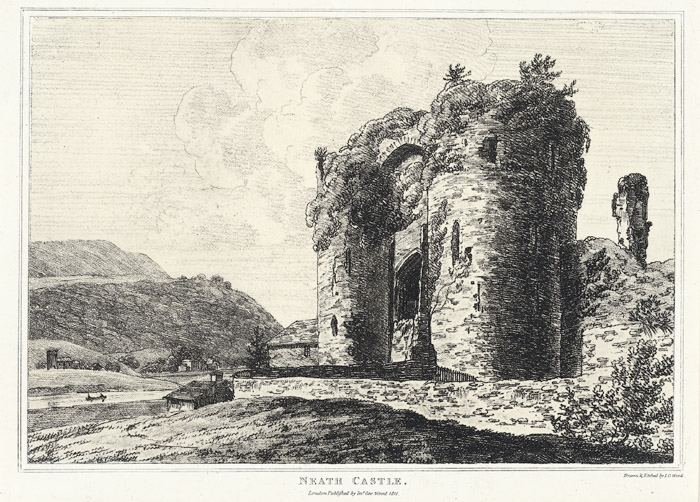
Neath Castle, 1811, by John George Wood (1768-1838)

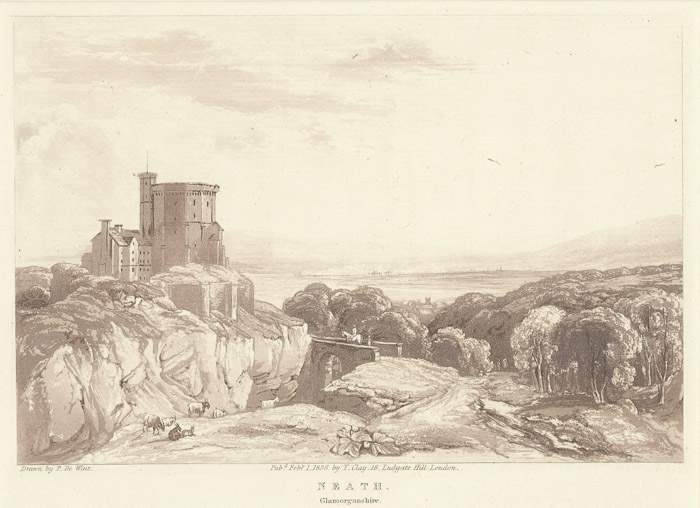
A view of Neath with a castle in the foreground, 1836 by Peter DeWint (1784-1849)
