= Stowe, Kilkhampton =

Demolished mansion in Cornwall, UK

Coordinates: 50.8729°N 4.5400°W

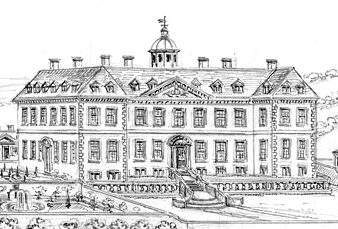
Stowe House, Kilkhampton. Detail from drawing (see below) by John Chessell Buckler in 1827 copied from an unknown original depiction, possibly from the engraving in the collection of Peter Prideaux-Brune. British Library, Add. MS 36360, f.167

Arms of Grenville: Gules, three clarions or

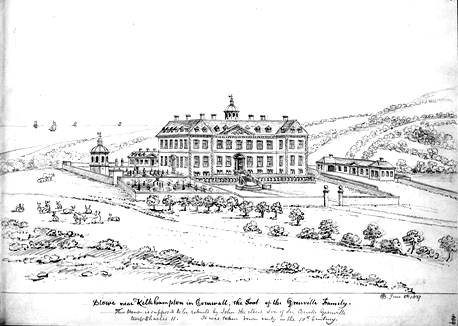
Stowe House, Kilkhampton, copied by John Chessell Buckler in 1827 from an unknown original depiction, possibly from the engraving in the collection of Peter Prideaux-Brune. British Library, Add. MS 36360, f.167

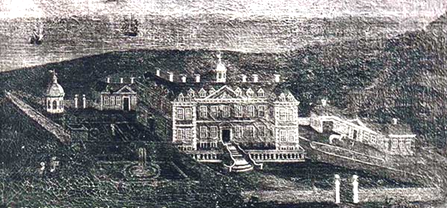
Stowe House, Kilkhampton, drawn by Edmund Prideaux (1693–1745) of Prideaux Place, Cornwall. Collection of Peter Prideaux-Brune of Prideaux Place, Cornwall. This picture in 1903 was in the possession of Mrs. Waddon Martyn, at Tonacombe Manor

Grenville arms above front door of Stowe Barton

Stowe House in the parish of Kilkhampton in Cornwall, United Kingdom, was a mansion built in 1679 by John Grenville, 1st Earl of Bath (1628–1701) and demolished in 1739. The Grenville family were for many centuries lords of the manor of Kilkhampton, which they held from the feudal barony of Gloucester, as they did their other principal seat of nearby Bideford in Devon. It is possible that the family's original residence at Kilkhampton was Kilkhampton Castle, of which only the groundworks survive, unusual in that it had a motte with two baileys.

== History ==
(For descent of Grenville family of Stowe see: Manor of Bideford)
The Grenville family's earliest seat was in their manor of Bideford in Devon, but from the 14th century they were also seated at Stowe. The last house on the site was built in about 1675 by John Granville, 1st Earl of Bath (1628–1701), created in 1660 in recompense for his great assistance in the Restoration of King Charles II, Baron Granville, Viscount Granville and Earl of Bath.

== Description ==
The house was built of brick with stone dressings and formed the shape of a rectangle, of three floors with hipped roof incorporating dormer windows and topped by a cupola, eleven bays wide by seven bays deep. It faced east, as drawn by Buckler. As well as a real tennis court and chapel, there was an extensive deer park with carriage driveways and formal gardens including fountains, statues and fish ponds. It was of similar style to Coleshill House, Lindridge House (demolished) and most comparable to Belton House. The Stowe Atlas is in the Cornwall archives and includes the park, mansion and gardens.

== Demolition ==
Charles Granville, 2nd Earl of Bath (1661–1701) succeeded his father in 1701 but died in a shooting accident, possibly suicide, shortly afterwards. He left as heir his nine-year-old only son William Henry Granville, 3rd Earl of Bath (1692–1711) who died in 1711 aged 19 without progeny. The inheritance was divided between the second earl's sisters and a cousin George Granville, Baron Lansdowne (died 1735), after whose death the family became extinct. The house was demolished in 1739.

In Polwhele's History of Cornwall, it is stated that a man resident in the nearby Grenville manor of Stratton lived long enough to see its site a cornfield before the building existed, and after the building was destroyed a cornfield again. The house was sold for building materials in 1739, and much of its fabric survives, having been used in the contemporary construction of West Country buildings.

== Survivals removed ==
The most notable surviving fabric of Stowe House exists as follows:

- Stowe House, Buckinghamshire. The carved cedar wood in the chapel, executed by Michael Chuke, was bought by Lord Cobham and applied to the same purpose at his mansion of Stowe in Buckinghamshire.
- Prideaux Place, Padstow, of which the Grenville Room contains carved woodwork from Stowe.
- Cross House, Little Torrington, Devon, in which exists the ornately carved wooden grand staircase from Stowe, of three flights around a square well. The balustrades are formed in open-work carving in the style of Grinling Gibbons of tumbling putti entwined in scrolls of foliage and flowers.

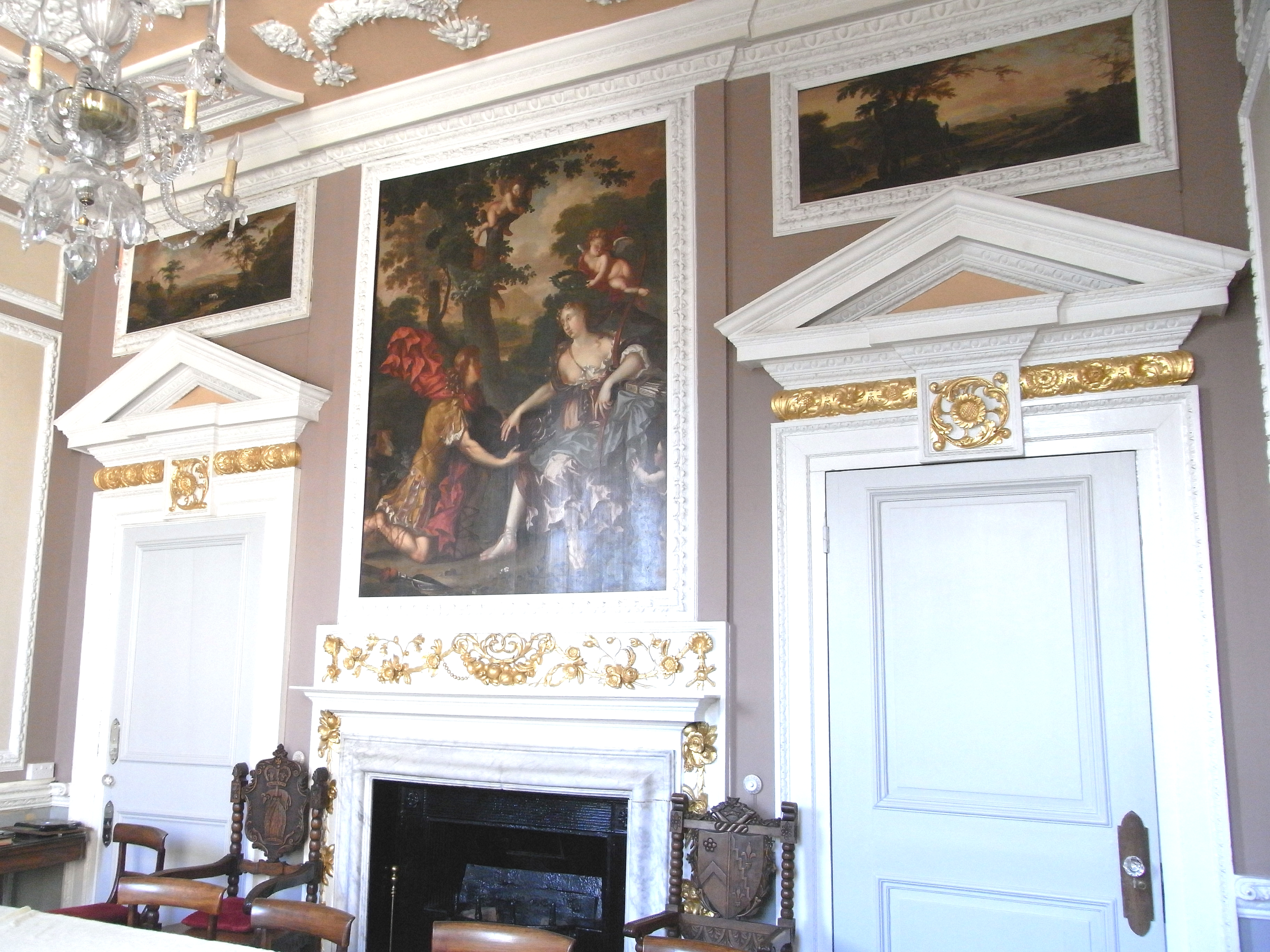
The Mayor's Parlour, The Guildhall, South Molton, Devon. The room was originally in Stowe House and was acquired for incorporation into the South Molton Guildhall designed 1739–41

- The Guildhall, South Molton, Devon, 1739–41, which incorporates an entire highly ornate small room, known as "The Mayor's Parlour", used historically by the town's mayor for entertaining. It includes plasterwork decorative picture frames, a decorated plaster ceiling, four doorcases with gilded pediments, a large overmantel painting in the style of Rubens of "Atalanta presented with the head of the Calydonian Boar by Meleager" and four classical capriccio scenes in small rectangular panels above the doors. The Corporation of South Molton, who were then building a new Town Hall and Council Chamber, purchased the following (prices in £, s, d):
  - Lady's fine Bed-chamber and planching (£35 0s 0d)
  - 9 shash windows at 10s 6d and 2 at 11s 6d ( £5 17s 6d)
  - no. 27 y^{e} winscott w^{th}out y^{e} chimney and door casings (£11 13s 0d)
  - 6 squares of Planching (£1 16s 0d)
  - A Tunn and ½ of Sheet & Pipe at 13s (£19 10s 0d)
  - 7 prs. of winscott window shutters at 8s (£2 16s 0d)
  - 172 rustic quoins at 1 (£8 12s 0d)
  - 4 Corinthian Capitalls & Pillasters (£2 2s 0d)
  - Ye caseing and ornaments of 3 windows (£1 11s 6d)
  - 3 Architraves w^{th} Pedem^{ts.} for doors & 27 y^{ds.} of winscott in the Lobby (£2 2s 0d)
  - A carved Cornish (i.e. cornice) and Triumph of K. Charles II. (£7 7s 0d)
  - 2 right panel doors (£1 1s 0d)

These articles, with many others, were taken to Bude, shipped to Barnstaple, and thence carted to South Molton. The outlay for the whole amounted to £178. The "carved Cornish and Triumph of Charles II" is still to be seen over the fireplace in the old dining-room in the Town Hall at South Molton.

== Survivals on site ==
The Steward's House survives at Stowe Barton as a farmhouse, and some new farmhouses were built locally from the unsold materials from Stowe and are notable for their fine appearance, for example Penstowe, also in the parish. A garden wall and building adjacent to the mansion garden appears to exist, as well as various other walls and building and garden foundations, including some brickwork at ground level. The carriage wash still exists. A map identifying the remains can be seen at National Trust heritage records

== Thynne ==
The manor of Kilkhampton was still owned in the early 20th century by descendants of Lady Grace Grenville, a daughter of the 1st Earl of Bath, namely by a junior branch of the Thynne family of Longleat in Wiltshire, created Marquess of Bath in 1789.

Francis John Thynne, of Haynes Park, Bedfordshire, was lord of the manors of Kilkhampton, Stratton and Binhamy. He was the second son of Rev. Lord John Thynne (1798–1881), Deputy Dean of Westminster, 3rd son of Thomas Thynne, 2nd Marquess of Bath (1765–1837). The sons of Francis Thynne included:

- Lt Col. Algernon Carteret Thynne (1868–1917), DSO, Royal North Devon Hussars, of Penstowe, Kilkhampton, who was killed in action in Palestine during World War I, and whose monument survives in Kilkhampton Church.
- Capt. George Augustus Carteret Thynne (1869–1945), Royal North Devon Yeomanry, who had descendants surviving in 1968.

== Stowe Barton ==
Stowe Barton Farm, the site of the mansion house is about 200 yards to the right

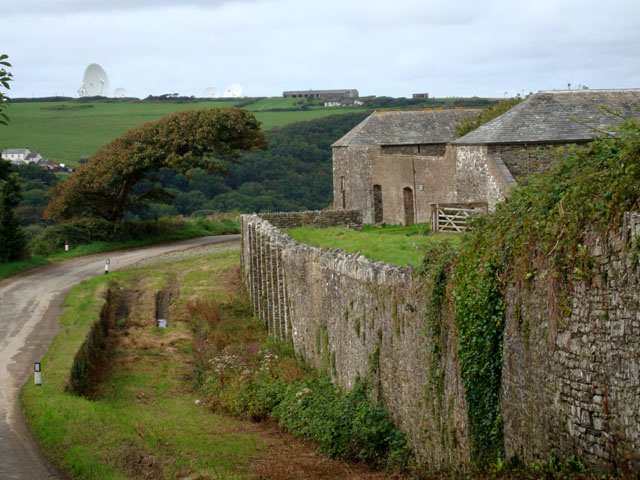
A closer view of the farm, with carriage washing pool

A range of stone buildings around a large courtyard, including a seven bedroom barton house with the Grenville arms sculpted above the front door, survives, located between the site of the demolished mansion and a surviving overgrown sunken garden believed to have adjoined the Tudor mansion house. The history of this barton house is not well recorded. Harper (1910) wrote:

All around, in the pastures of Stowe Farm, may be traced the grassy mounds and hollows that mark the foundations and the terraces of the vanished house, and the meadow immediately in front of the farmhouse is very largely pitched with a pavement of cobble-stones, a little beneath the surface. The grumbling farmer, on an evening tour of inspection of his gates, left open as a rule by trespassing Bude visitors, showed fragments of pillars and architectural carving often dug up. "Look here", he said, crossing the road and pointing to a sunken space in a field, "that is where they brought up their early vegetables".

The "Stowe Barton Farm" estate is now owned by the National Trust and comprises 218 hectares (540 acres) of farmland and 5.77 hectares (14.3 acres) of woodland. It was offered to let by the National Trust in July 2014.

== Sources ==
- Beckett, Matthew, Lost Heritage- a memorial to the lost country houses of England
