= Mabel FitzRobert, Countess of Gloucester =

Anglo-Norman noblewoman

Mabel FitzRobert
- Countess of Gloucester; Lady of Glamorgan; Dame of Sainte-Scholasse-sur-Sarthe; Dame of Evrecy; Dame of Creully
- Born: c. 1100; Gloucestershire, England
- Died: 29 September 1157; Bristol, England
- Noble family: FitzHamon
- Spouse: Robert, 1st Earl of Gloucester (m. 1119; died 1147)
- Issue: William Fitz Robert, 2nd Earl of Gloucester; Roger, Bishop of Worcester; Robert FitzRobert of Ilchester; Richard FitzRobert, Sire of Creully; Philip FitzRobert; Maud FitzRobert; Mabel FitzRobert
- Father: Robert FitzHamon, Lord of Gloucester and Glamorgan
- Mother: Sybil de Montgomery

Mabel FitzRobert, Countess of Gloucester (c. 1100 – 29 September 1157) was an Anglo-Norman noblewoman, and a wealthy heiress who brought the lordship of Gloucester, among other prestigious honours to her husband, Robert, 1st Earl of Gloucester upon their marriage. He was the illegitimate son of King Henry I of England.

Her father was Robert Fitzhamon, Lord of Gloucester and Glamorgan. As she was the eldest daughter of four, and her younger sisters had become nuns, Mabel inherited all of his honours and properties upon his death in 1107.

As Countess of Gloucester, Mabel was significant politically and she exercised an important administrative role in the lordship.

== Family ==
Mabel was born in Gloucestershire, England around 1100, the eldest of the four daughters of Robert FitzHamon, Lord of Gloucester and Glamorgan, and his wife, Sybil de Montgomery. Her three younger sisters, Hawise, Cecile and Amice all became nuns, making Mabel the sole heiress to her father's lordships and vast estates in England, Wales, and Normandy.

Her paternal grandfather was Hamon, Sheriff of Kent, and her maternal grandparents were Roger de Montgomery, 1st Earl of Shrewsbury and Mabel de Bellême.

In March 1107, her father died in Normandy, leaving his lordships and estates to Mabel. Her mother married secondly Jean, Sire de Raimes.

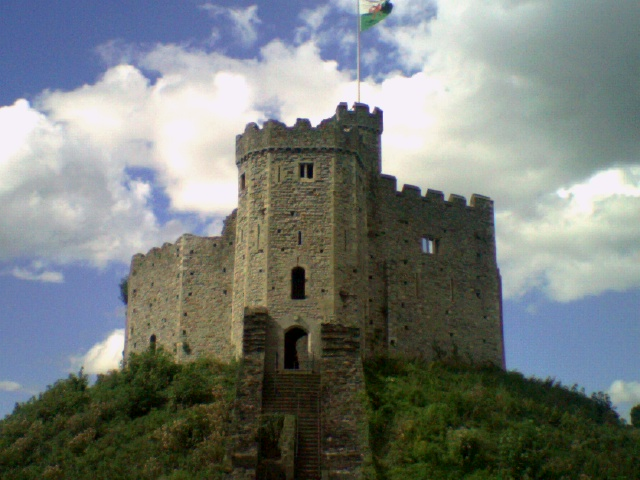
Cardiff Castle in Wales, was one of the properties Mabel brought her husband, Robert upon their marriage

== Marriage ==
Mabel's marriage to the future Earl of Gloucester (known as Robert of Caen or Robert FitzRoy or FitzEdith), an illegitimate son of King Henry I, was solemnized in June 1119, although their marriage may have been contracted as early as 1107; it is recorded by Orderic Vitalis who also names her parents. Robert would later become an important figure during the turbulent period in English history known as The Anarchy which occurred in the reign of King Stephen of England. Throughout the civil war, he was a loyal supporter of his half-sister Empress Matilda who would make him the chief commander of her army. He had originally sworn fealty to King Stephen, but after quarrelling with him in 1137, his English and Welsh possessions were forfeited, and thus he joined forces with Matilda.

== Countess of Gloucester ==
Mabel brought to her husband the honours of Gloucester in England, Glamorgan in Wales, Sainte-Scholasse-sur-Sarthe, Evrecy and Creully in Normandy. By right of his wife, he became the 2nd Lord of Glamorgan, and gained possession of her father's castle of Cardiff in Wales. In August 1122, he was created 1st Earl of Gloucester; henceforth, Mabel was styled as Countess of Gloucester.

As countess, Mabel exercised a prominent administrative role in the Gloucester lordship. Her political importance was evident when she was made responsible for seeing that her husband upheld his side of the agreement in the treaty he made with Miles de Gloucester, 1st Earl of Hereford. She also witnessed four of Robert's charters; as well as giving her personal consent for his foundation of the Abbey of Margam, whose endowment came from her own lands. Later, after Robert's death, Mabel assumed control of the honour of Gloucester's Norman lands on behalf of her eldest son William.

== Issue ==
Together Robert and Mabel had at least eight children:

- William Fitz Robert, 2nd Earl of Gloucester (died 23 November 1183), married Hawise de Beaumont by whom he had five children, including Isabella of Gloucester, the first wife of King John of England, and Amice FitzRobert, Countess of Gloucester.
- Roger, Bishop of Worcester (died 9 August 1179)
- Hamon FitzRobert, (died 1159), killed in the Siege of Toulouse.
- Robert FitzRobert of Ilchester (died before 1157), married Hawise de Redvers, by whom he had a daughter Mabel who in her turn married Jordan de Cambernon.
- Richard FitzRobert, Sire de Creully (died 1175), inherited the seigneury of Creully from Mabel, and became the ancestor of the Sires de Creully. He married the daughter of Hughes de Montfort by whom he had five children.
- Philip FitzRobert, (died after 1147), Castellan of Cricklade. He took part in the Second Crusade.
- Maud FitzRobert (died 29 July 1190), married Ranulf de Gernon, 4th Earl of Chester by whom she had three children.
- Mabel FitzRobert, married Aubrey de Vere

Robert also sired an illegitimate son, Richard, Bishop of Bayeux by Isabel de Douvres.

== Death ==
Mabel's husband died on 31 October 1147. Mabel herself died on 29 September 1157 in Bristol at the age of fifty-seven years. She was buried at St James' Priory, Bristol.
