= Wyche =

Wyche is a surname, and may refer to:

- C. Thomas Wyche (1926–2015), American lawyer and conservationist
- Charles Cecil Wyche (1885–1966), judge
- Cyril Wyche (1632–1707), president of the Royal Society
- Cyril Wyche (Wyche baronets) (1695–1756), 1st Baronet, Ambassador to Russia
- Ira T. Wyche (1887–1981), American major general
- James Wyche (born 1982), American football player
- Jane Wyche (17th century), wife of John Granville, 1st Earl of Bath
- Larry D. Wyche, retired U.S. Army Lieutenant General
- Nathaniel Wyche (1607–1659), president of the English East India Company
- Peter Wyche (ambassador) (1593–1643), English Ambassador to the Ottoman Empire
- Peter Wyche (diplomat) (1628–1699), English Ambassador to Russia and Poland
- Richard Wyche a.k.a. Richard of Chichester (1197–1253), Saint and Bishop of Chichester
- Richard Wyche (merchant) (1554–1621), director of the English East India Company
- Sam Wyche (1945–2020), former American football coach and player
- Sid Wyche (1922–1983), American songwriter
- Steve Wyche (born 1966), American football journalist and broadcaster
- Zelma Wyche (1918–1999), Louisiana politician and African-American civil rights activist
- Rachel Wyche (2003), Feminist, environmentalist and writer

== See also ==
- Wyche Fowler, former U.S. Senator and Ambassador
- Wyche, Virginia, community in Brunswick County, U.S.
- Wyche, Worcestershire, suburb of Malvern, England
- Wyche Island, Antarctica
- Dark Eldar, elements of a work of fiction: wych cult
- Droitwich, England, settlement for which Wyche was an old name
