= Segeberg – Stormarn-Mitte =

Federal electoral district of Germany

8 Segeberg – Stormarn-Mitte
- Electoral district for the Bundestag
- Segeberg – Stormarn-Mitte in 2025
- State: Schleswig-Holstein
- Population: 320,600 (2019)
- Electorate: 249,202 (2021)
- Major settlements: Norderstedt; Henstedt-Ulzburg; Bad Oldesloe
- Area: 1,333.4 km^{2}

Current electoral district
- Created: 1976
- Party: CDU
- Member: Melanie Bernstein
- Elected: 2025

Segeberg – Stormarn-Mitte is an electoral constituency (German: Wahlkreis) represented in the Bundestag. It elects one member via first-past-the-post voting. Under the current constituency numbering system, it is designated as constituency 8. It is located in south central Schleswig-Holstein, comprising most of the Segeberg district and northwestern parts of the Stormarn district.

Segeberg – Stormarn-Mitte was created for the 1976 federal election. Since 2021, it has been represented by Bengt Bergt of the Social Democratic Party (SPD).

== Geography ==
Segeberg – Stormarn-Mitte is located in south central Schleswig-Holstein. As of the 2021 federal election, it comprises most of the Segeberg district (with the exception of the urban municipality of Bad Bramstedt and the Ämter of Bad Bramstedt-Land and Boostedt-Rickling) and northwestern parts of the Stormarn district (specifically the urban municipalities of Ammersbek, Bad Oldesloe, Bargteheide, the Ämter of Bad Oldesloe-Land and Bargteheide-Land, and the municipality of Tangstedt).

== History ==
Segeberg – Stormarn-Mitte was created in 1976, then known as Segeberg – Stormarn-Nord. It contained parts of the abolished constituencies of Segeberg – Eutin and Stormarn – Herzogtum Lauenburg. Originally, it covered the entirety of the Segeberg district; however, the Ämter of Bad Bramstedt-Land and Boostedt-Rickling were transferred to different constituencies in the 2002 election. In addition, the municipality of Reinfeld and the Amt of Nordstormarn were originally part of Segeberg – Stormarn-Nord; they were transferred to Ostholstein constituency in the 1998 election. Conversely, the municipality of Ammersbek was transferred to Segeberg – Stormarn-Nord from Herzogtum Lauenburg – Stormarn-Süd in the 2002 election. The constituency acquired its current name in the 2013 election.

Election	No.	Name	Borders
1976	8	Segeberg – Stormarn-Nord	Segeberg district; Stormarn district (only Bad Oldesloe, Bargteheide, Reinfeld, and Tangstedt municipalities, and Bad Oldesloe-Land Amt, Bargteheide-Land Amt, and Nordstormarn Amt)
1980	8	Segeberg – Stormarn-Nord	Segeberg district; Stormarn district (only Bad Oldesloe, Bargteheide, Reinfeld, and Tangstedt municipalities, and Bad Oldesloe-Land Amt, Bargteheide-Land Amt, and Nordstormarn Amt)
1983	8	Segeberg – Stormarn-Nord	Segeberg district; Stormarn district (only Bad Oldesloe, Bargteheide, Reinfeld, and Tangstedt municipalities, and Bad Oldesloe-Land Amt, Bargteheide-Land Amt, and Nordstormarn Amt)
1987	8	Segeberg – Stormarn-Nord	Segeberg district; Stormarn district (only Bad Oldesloe, Bargteheide, Reinfeld, and Tangstedt municipalities, and Bad Oldesloe-Land Amt, Bargteheide-Land Amt, and Nordstormarn Amt)
1990	8	Segeberg – Stormarn-Nord	Segeberg district; Stormarn district (only Bad Oldesloe, Bargteheide, Reinfeld, and Tangstedt municipalities, and Bad Oldesloe-Land Amt, Bargteheide-Land Amt, and Nordstormarn Amt)
1994	8	Segeberg – Stormarn-Nord	Segeberg district; Stormarn district (only Bad Oldesloe, Bargteheide, Reinfeld, and Tangstedt municipalities, and Bad Oldesloe-Land Amt, Bargteheide-Land Amt, and Nordstormarn Amt)
1998	8	Segeberg – Stormarn-Nord	Segeberg district; Stormarn district (only Bad Oldesloe, Bargteheide, and Tangstedt municipalities, and Bad Oldesloe-Land Amt and Bargteheide-Land Amt)
2002	8	Segeberg – Stormarn-Nord	Segeberg district (excluding Bad Bramstedt-Land and Boostedt-Rickling); Stormarn district (only Ammersbek, Bad Oldesloe, Bargteheide, and Tangstedt municipalities, and Bad Oldesloe-Land Amt and Bargteheide-Land Amt)
2005	8	Segeberg – Stormarn-Nord	Segeberg district (excluding Bad Bramstedt-Land and Boostedt-Rickling); Stormarn district (only Ammersbek, Bad Oldesloe, Bargteheide, and Tangstedt municipalities, and Bad Oldesloe-Land Amt and Bargteheide-Land Amt)
2009	8	Segeberg – Stormarn-Nord	Segeberg district (excluding Bad Bramstedt-Land and Boostedt-Rickling); Stormarn district (only Ammersbek, Bad Oldesloe, Bargteheide, and Tangstedt municipalities, and Bad Oldesloe-Land Amt and Bargteheide-Land Amt)
2013	8	Segeberg – Stormarn-Mitte	Segeberg district (excluding Bad Bramstedt-Land and Boostedt-Rickling); Stormarn district (only Ammersbek, Bad Oldesloe, Bargteheide, and Tangstedt municipalities, and Bad Oldesloe-Land Amt and Bargteheide-Land Amt)
2017	8	Segeberg – Stormarn-Mitte	Segeberg district (excluding Bad Bramstedt-Land and Boostedt-Rickling); Stormarn district (only Ammersbek, Bad Oldesloe, Bargteheide, and Tangstedt municipalities, and Bad Oldesloe-Land Amt and Bargteheide-Land Amt)
2021	8	Segeberg – Stormarn-Mitte	Segeberg district (excluding Bad Bramstedt-Land and Boostedt-Rickling); Stormarn district (only Ammersbek, Bad Oldesloe, Bargteheide, and Tangstedt municipalities, and Bad Oldesloe-Land Amt and Bargteheide-Land Amt)
2025	8	Segeberg – Stormarn-Mitte	Segeberg district (excluding Bad Bramstedt-Land and Boostedt-Rickling); Stormarn district (only Ammersbek, Bad Oldesloe, Bargteheide, and Tangstedt municipalities, and Bad Oldesloe-Land Amt and Bargteheide-Land Amt)

== Members ==
The constituency was held by the Christian Democratic Union (CDU) from its creation in 1976 until 1980, during which time it was represented by Peter Kurt Würzbach. It was won by the Social Democratic Party (SPD) in 1980, and represented by Günther Heyenn for a single term. Former member Würzbach regained the constituency in 1983, and represented it until 1998. From 1998 to 2005, it was held by the SPD and its member was Franz Thönnes. Gero Storjohann of the CDU was elected in 2005, and re-elected in 2009, 2013, and 2017. Bengt Bergt won the constituency for the SPD in 2021. Melanie Bernstein was elected for the CDU in 2025.

Election	Member	Party	%
1976	Peter Kurt Würzbach	CDU	47.5
1980	Günther Heyenn	SPD	45.9
1983	Peter Kurt Würzbach	CDU	53.0
1987	Peter Kurt Würzbach	CDU	49.7
1990	Peter Kurt Würzbach	CDU	49.3
1994	Peter Kurt Würzbach	CDU	49.2
1998	Franz Thönnes	SPD	46.7
2002	Franz Thönnes	SPD	46.7
2005	Gero Storjohann	CDU	43.9
2009	Gero Storjohann	CDU	39.8
2013	Gero Storjohann	CDU	45.4
2017	Gero Storjohann	CDU	41.1
2021	Bengt Bergt	SPD	32.0
2025	Melanie Bernstein	CDU	32.3

== Election results ==
=== 2025 election ===
Federal election (2025): Segeberg – Stormarn-Mitte
Notes:	Blue background denotes the winner of the electorate vote. Pink background denotes a candidate elected from their party list. Yellow background denotes an electorate win by a list member, or other incumbent. A ✓ or ✗ denotes status of any incumbent, win or lose respectively.						
Party	Candidate	Votes	%	±%	Party votes	%	±%
CDU	Melanie Bernstein	67,881	32.3	▲4.4	61,079	29.0	▲6.7
SPD	✗ Bengt Bergt	51,437	24.5	▼7.5	40,275	19.1	▼9.4
AfD	Sven Wendorf	36,071	17.2	▲10.1	36,211	17.2	▲9.9
Greens	Julia Dorandt	24,800	11.8	▼1.9	28,809	13.7	▼3.1
Left	Herrmann von Prüssing	12,636	6.0	▲2.9	14,887	7.1	▲3.8
FDP	Nora Grundmann	9,417	4.5	▼5.9	10,974	5.2	▼8.7
BSW					7,744	3.7	New
SSW					4,388	2.1	▲0.5
Volt	Sebastian Warncke	3,352	1.6	New	2,172	1.0	▲0.8
FW	Thomas Thedens	3,262	1.6	▼0.8	1,706	0.8	▼0.3
PARTEI					1,705	0.8	▼0.3
BD	Patrick Schnoor	1,193	0.6	New	505	0.2	New
MLPD					56	<0.1	0.0
Informal votes		1,501			1,039		
Total valid votes		210,049			210,511		
Turnout		211,550	84.9	▲4.8			
CDU gain from SPD	Majority	16,444	7.8	N/A			

=== 2021 election ===
Federal election (2021): Segeberg – Stormarn-Mitte
Notes:	Blue background denotes the winner of the electorate vote. Pink background denotes a candidate elected from their party list. Yellow background denotes an electorate win by a list member, or other incumbent. A ✓ or ✗ denotes status of any incumbent, win or lose respectively.						
Party	Candidate	Votes	%	±%	Party votes	%	±%
SPD	Bengt Bergt	63,369	32.0	▲4.7	56,658	28.6	▲6.2
CDU	✗ Gero Storjohann	55,265	27.9	▼13.2	44,285	22.3	▼12.2
Greens	Nils Bollenbach	27,109	13.7	▲5.4	33,361	16.8	▲5.9
FDP	Jan Schupp	20,575	10.4	▲2.3	27,675	14.0	▲0.4
AfD	Sven Wendorf	14,040	7.1	▼1.1	14,527	7.3	▼1.6
Left	Malin Schultz	6,202	3.1	▼2.5	6,468	3.3	▼3.6
SSW					3,108	1.6	
FW	Julia Glagau	4,670	2.4	▲1.1	2,297	1.2	▲0.4
dieBasis	Claudia Westphal	3,389	1.7		2,839	1.4	
Tierschutzpartei					2,663	1.3	
PARTEI	Beate Schreiber	3,299	1.7		2,226	1.1	0.0
Team Todenhöfer					586	0.3	
Volt					509	0.3	
NPD					225	0.1	▼0.1
V-Partei3					202	0.1	
ÖDP					194	0.1	▼0.1
Humanists					186	0.1	
du.					119	0.1	
DKP					54	0.0	
LKR					53	0.0	
MLPD					30	0.0	0.0
Informal votes		1,700			1,353		
Total valid votes		197,918			198,265		
Turnout		199,618	80.1	▲1.9			
SPD gain from CDU	Majority	8,104	4.1				

=== 2017 election ===
Federal election (2017): Segeberg – Stormarn-Mitte
Notes:	Blue background denotes the winner of the electorate vote. Pink background denotes a candidate elected from their party list. Yellow background denotes an electorate win by a list member, or other incumbent. A ✓ or ✗ denotes status of any incumbent, win or lose respectively.						
Party	Candidate	Votes	%	±%	Party votes	%	±%
CDU	✓ Gero Storjohann	78,824	41.1	▼4.3	66,367	34.6	▼6.3
SPD	Alexander Wagner	52,434	27.3	▼7.9	43,027	22.4	▼7.7
Greens	Ulrike Täck	16,004	8.3	▲2.2	21,010	10.9	▲2.3
AfD	Heiko Evermann	15,682	8.2	▲4.4	17,166	8.9	▲4.0
FDP	Tobias Mährlein	15,617	8.1	▲6.1	26,043	13.6	▲7.8
Left	Miro Berbig	10,838	5.7	▲1.8	13,237	6.9	▲1.9
FW	Rainer Schuchardt	2,373	1.2	▲0.4	1,532	0.8	▲0.2
PARTEI					2,136	1.1	
BGE					503	0.3	
NPD					463	0.2	▼0.5
ÖDP					392	0.2	
MLPD					69	0.0	0.0
Informal votes		1,508			1,335		
Total valid votes		191,772			191,945		
Turnout		193,280	78.2	▲3.1			
CDU hold	Majority	26,390	13.8	▲3.7			

=== 2013 election ===
Federal election (2013): Segeberg – Stormarn-Mitte
Notes:	Blue background denotes the winner of the electorate vote. Pink background denotes a candidate elected from their party list. Yellow background denotes an electorate win by a list member, or other incumbent. A ✓ or ✗ denotes status of any incumbent, win or lose respectively.						
Party	Candidate	Votes	%	±%	Party votes	%	±%
CDU	✓ Gero Storjohann	82,471	45.4	▲4.6	74,161	40.8	▲7.9
SPD	Franz Thönnes	63,998	35.3	▲4.6	54,691	30.1	▲5.0
Greens	Peter Stoltenberg	11,141	6.1	▼3.3	15,695	8.6	▼3.4
Left	Miro Berbig	7,003	3.9	▼3.2	9,112	5.0	▼3.1
AfD	Jörg Nobis	6,879	3.8		9,034	5.0	
FDP	Klaus-Peter Eberhard	3,722	2.1	▼9.3	10,449	5.8	▼12.0
Pirates	Oliver Grube	3,546	2.0		3,686	2.0	0.0
FW	Rainer Schuchardt	1,565	0.9		1,129	0.6	
NPD	Henry Karl Heinrich Johannsen	1,190	0.7	▼0.4	1,307	0.7	▼0.2
Tierschutzpartei					1,534	0.8	
Rentner					746	0.4	▼0.6
MLPD					46	0.0	0.0
Informal votes		1,735			1,660		
Total valid votes		181,515			181,590		
Turnout		183,250	75.0	▲0.1			
CDU hold	Majority	18,473	10.1	▲0.9			

=== 2009 election ===
Federal election (2009): Segeberg – Stormarn-Nord
Notes:	Blue background denotes the winner of the electorate vote. Pink background denotes a candidate elected from their party list. Yellow background denotes an electorate win by a list member, or other incumbent. A ✓ or ✗ denotes status of any incumbent, win or lose respectively.						
Party	Candidate	Votes	%	±%	Party votes	%	±%
CDU	✓ Gero Storjohann	70,290	39.8	▼4.1	58,225	32.9	▼3.9
SPD	Franz Thönnes	54,065	30.6	▼12.0	44,445	25.1	▼11.5
FDP	Klaus-Peter Eberhard	20,083	11.4	▲7.3	31,407	17.7	▲6.4
Greens	Peter Stoltenberg	16,633	9.4	▲5.4	21,245	12.0	▲3.4
Left	Miro Berbig	12,527	7.1	▲3.9	14,280	8.1	▲3.7
Pirates					3,598	2.0	
Rentner					1,814	1.0	
NPD	Ingo Stawitz	1,797	1.0	▲0.2	1,687	1.0	0.0
Independent		1,225	0.7				
DVU					233	0.1	
MLPD					58	0.0	0.0
Informal votes		3,674			3,303		
Total valid votes		176,621			176,992		
Turnout		180,295	75.1	▼5.7			
CDU hold	Majority	16,225	9.2	▲7.9			

=== 2005 election ===
Federal election (2005):Segeberg – Stormarn-Nord
Notes:	Blue background denotes the winner of the electorate vote. Pink background denotes a candidate elected from their party list. Yellow background denotes an electorate win by a list member, or other incumbent. A ✓ or ✗ denotes status of any incumbent, win or lose respectively.						
Party	Candidate	Votes	%	±%	Party votes	%	±%
CDU	Gero Storjohann	81,812	43.9	▲3.4	68,553	36.8	▲0.1
SPD	✗ Franz Thönnes	79,520	42.6	▼4.1	68,214	36.6	▼4.6
FDP	Wolfgang Schnabel	7,530	4.0	▼1.9	21,167	11.3	▲2.7
Greens	Monika Heinold	7,522	4.0	▼1.0	16,110	8.6	▼0.7
Left	Heinz-Michael Kittler	5,971	3.2	▲2.1	8,166	4.4	▲0.7
Familie	Werner Lahann	2,548	1.4		2,517	1.3	
NPD	Wolfgang Schimmel	1,550	0.8		1,707	0.9	▲0.7
MLPD					91	0.0	
Informal votes		2,179			2,107		
Total valid votes		186,453			186,525		
Turnout		188,632	80.8	▼1.4			
SPD gain from CDU	Majority	2,292	1.3				
