= Peter Saltonstall =

English courtier and lawyer

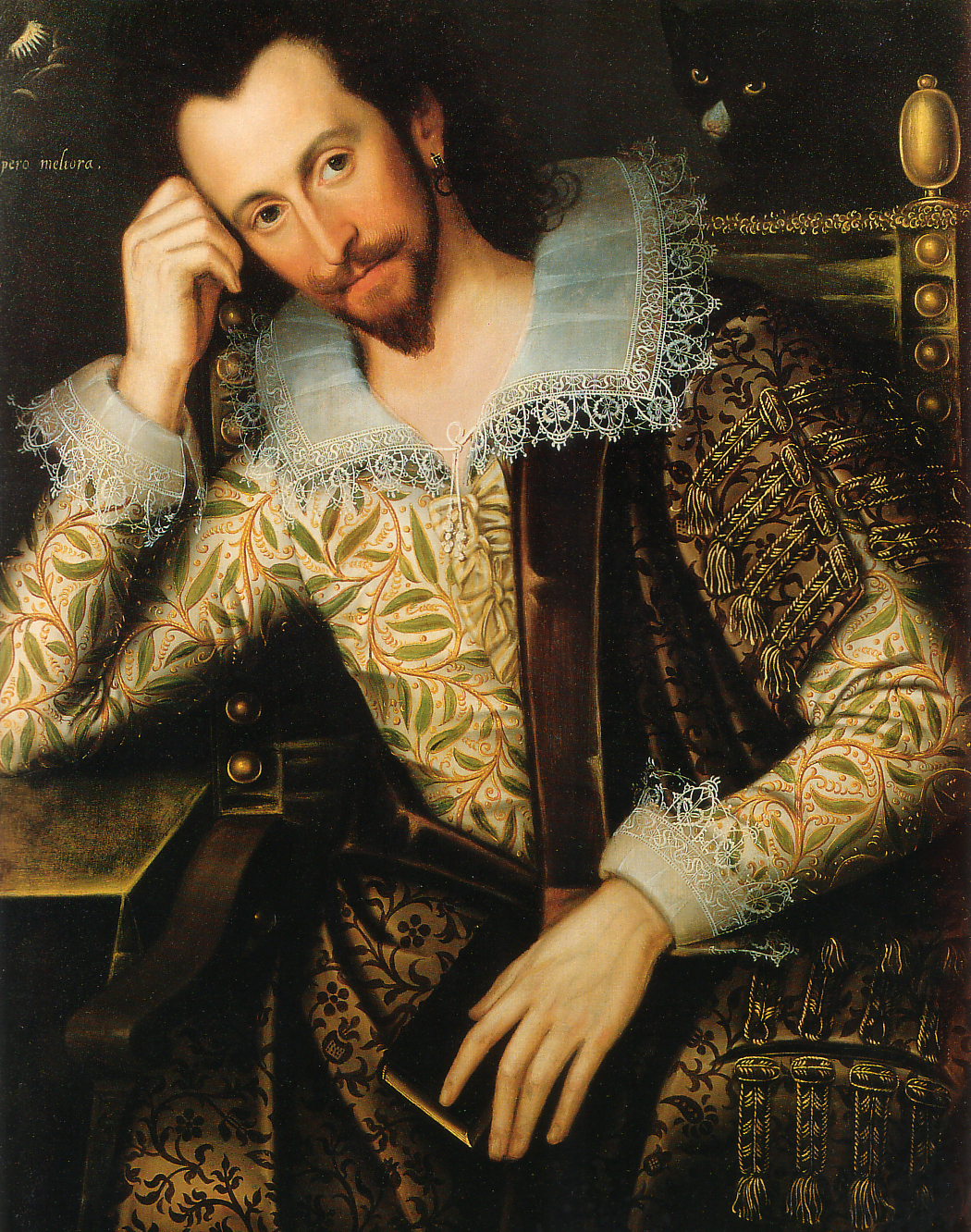
Peter Saltonstall, circa 1610

Peter Saltonstall (1577–1651) was an English courtier and lawyer.

He was the fourth son of Richard Saltonstall, Lord Mayor of London and Susanna Saltonstall née Pointz, from whom he inherited the manors of Barkway in Royston.

The Saltonstall family originated in the Halifax area. His mother was an aunt of the translator Adrian Poyntz, who dedicated his New and singular patternes & workes of linnen (London, 1591), and Treasure of the Soule (London, 1596) to her and Richard Saltonstall.

== Career ==
While still a student of law at the Temple, Peter Saltonstall visited Scotland with the poet Benjamin Rudyerd, a friend from the Middle Temple in October 1601. The border official John Carey heard that Saltonstall assumed the name "Courtney" when he passed through Berwick-upon-Tweed and wore mean clothing, but carried a "very rich suit of apparel". Rudyerd called himself "Davis". The pair were tricked, and marked to be robbed, then imprisoned. Saltonstall and Rudyerd wrote to the resident diplomat in Edinburgh, George Nicholson, explaining their predicament. They had come to Scotland as innocent tourists. They crossed the border with a potential thief Robert Bruce alias Peter Nerne without any licence or passport. Sir Robert Ker arrested them and held them at his house, Friars, near Kelso for a few days. The English border official at Berwick, John Carey was sceptical about the news and it was thought the pair might be Jesuits on a secret mission.

They were freed and met James VI in Edinburgh, who "used them with good countenance". Nicholson sent them back to London to see Sir Robert Cecil. Carey heard that Saltonstall was in love with Rudyerd's sister, and a love rival had organised his troubles in Scotland.

His father had been involved with Scots in London in the 1590s, "Alderman Salkingstone" delivered letters from Colonel William Stewart to Archibald Douglas in September 1590.

In 1602 the lawyer John Manningham met the Scottish refugee Barbara Ruthven and wrote, "I sawe this afternoone a Scottishe Lady at Mr. Fleetes in Loathebury; shee was sister to Earl Gowre, a gallant tall gentlewoman, somewhat long visage, a lisping fumbling language. Peter Saltingstone came to visit hir".

He was knighted in October 1605 at Windsor Castle. At court he became an equerry, escorting diplomats and ambassadors. His sister Anne Saltonstall married James Douglas, a grandson of George Douglas of Parkhead.

King James sent Saltonstall to the Duke of Savoy in Turin in 1612 accompanying the ambassador Henry Wotton with a gift of ten ambling gelding horses. On the way, near Lyon, one of the horses injured a hoof on a pruner's sickle. Wotton was in no hurry to return from Turin, and according to John Chamberlain Saltonstall got back to London first and delivered his messages, so doing the "best part of his errand for him".

A list of equerries to King James in 1625 includes Peter Saltonstall with a fee of £20. The other equerries were; Robert Osbourne, Thomas Metham, Sigismund Zinzan, John Carelton, George Digbie, Roger Fielding, Gabriel Hippisley, and William Sanderson. The equerries of the late Anne of Denmark were Edward Bushell (who married a sister of Mary Gargrave), John Gill, Gregory Fenner, and Maurice Drummond.

His sister Elizabeth Saltonstall married Richard Wyche. Their son Peter Wyche was ambassador in Constantinople. A well-known anecdote concerns his wife's farthingale. It was said that in 1628 she astonished Ayşe Sultan, wife of Murad IV, with her costume and she wondered if all English women had such an unusual shape. This story may have been composed in condemnation of the fashion of wearing fathingales.

== Marriage and family ==
Peter Saltonstall married Christian Pettus (1586–1646) on 10 May 1607. Their children included:

- Susannah Saltonstall (died 1633), who married Robert Castell
- Ann Saltonstall (1617–1647), who married Sir Edward Chester
- Christian Saltonstall
- Bridget Saltonstall (1624–1639)
- Elizabeth Saltonstall (1623–1640)

The family monuments with verse epitaphs are in Barkway church.
