= Peter Wyche =

Peter Wyche is the name of:

- Sir Peter Wyche (ambassador) (c. 1593-1643), English merchant and ambassador to the Ottoman Empire
- Sir Peter Wyche (diplomat) (1628-c. 1699), English diplomat and translator
