= Wichefjellet =

Mountain in Sabine Land at Spitsbergen, Svalbard

Coordinates: 78.478°N 18.874°E

Wichefjellet is a mountain in Sabine Land at Spitsbergen, Svalbard. It is named after English merchant and ship owner Richard Wiche. The mountain belongs to the mountain group of Hahnfjella, and is situated west of the bay of Wichebukta.
