= James Douglas of Parkhead =

Scottish landowner

James Douglas of Parkhead (died 1608) was a Scottish landowner.

Arms of the House Douglas of Parkhead

He was a son of George Douglas of Parkhead and Marion Douglas.

Douglas married Elizabeth Carlyle, daughter of William, Master of Carlyle. She was an heiress and the marriage was probably arranged by Regent Morton. It was said that he was cruel to her.

In March 1580 he fought with Robert Aslowane in Edinburgh. Aslowane was injured and his wounds were tended by several surgeons including Gilbert Primrose. When they declared Aslowane was likely to recover, James Douglas and his accomplices were released by the town authorities, who had also received a notice from James VI that he should be released.

On 2 November 1596 James Douglas of Parkhead and his accomplices killed his father's enemy, James Stewart, the former Earl of Arran at Symington. They claimed that Stewart was technically a rebel, "at the horn".

As his tombstone at Holyrood Abbey mentions, James Douglas was killed on the Royal Mile Edinburgh on 13 July 1608, by Captain William Stewart, son of William Stewart of Monkton and a nephew of Arran. Elizabeth Carlyle then married William Sinclair of Blaas. The inscription at Holyrood reads:

Heir lyes the noble and potent Lord James Douglas, Lord of Cairlell, air and heretrix thairof, wha was slaine in Edinburgh the XIII day of July 1608, wes slaine in 48 ye

His children included:

- James Douglas, Lord Torthorwald, who married (1) Elizabeth Gordon, daughter of Robert Gordon of Lochinvar, (2) Anne Saltonstall, daughter of Richard Saltonstall, Lord Mayor of London, and a sister of Peter Saltonstall
