= Wilbur Fisk Tillett =

- Born: August 25, 1854; Henderson, North Carolina, U.S.
- Died: June 4, 1936 (aged 81); Nashville, Tennessee, U.S.
- Education: Randolph–Macon College; Princeton Theological Seminary
- Occupations: Preacher, university professor
- Spouse(s): 1888 Kate Schoolfield (d. 1889); 1894 Laura McLoud
- Children: Kate Schoolfield Tillett Smith
- Parent(s): Reverend John Tillett; Elizabeth Jenkins Wyche

Wilbur Fisk Tillett (1854–1936) was an American Methodist clergyman and educator.

== Early life ==
Wilbur Fisk Tillett was born August 25, 1854, in Henderson, North Carolina, which at that time was in Granville County (later Vance). He was named for the early 19th-century Methodist theologian Willbur Fisk. His father was an itinerant Methodist minister in North Carolina, John Tillett (1812–1890).

Tillett graduated from Randolph–Macon College in 1877 and from Princeton Theological Seminary in 1880.

== Career ==
Tillett spent the bulk of his teaching career at Vanderbilt University in Nashville, Tennessee. He was Professor of Systematic Theology and Dean of the Theological Faculty after 1884 and vice chancellor after 1886. During his tenure, he invited Booker T. Washington to speak at Vanderbilt on the topic, "How can a young Southern man help in the lifting up of the Negro race?".

Tillett argued that the United States had been established by God himself to usher in the Kingdom. Moreover, he argued that the emancipation of black slaves as a result of the American Civil War of 1861–65 had been good for white Southern men as it had turned them into self-reliant hard workers instead of idle planters.

== Death ==
Tillett died on June 4, 1936, in Nashville.

== Bibliography ==
- The White Man of the New South (in The Century Magazine, No. 33, 1886-1887).
- Southern Womanhood as Affected by the War (in The Century Magazine, November 1891).
- Our Hymns and Their Authors (1900).
- The Date and Authorship of the Book of Daniel (1900).
- Personal Salvation (1902).
- Modern Archaeology and the Old Testament (1903).
- A Statement of the Faith: World Wide Methodism (1906).
- Theological Seminaries and Teacher Training: A Discussion of the Preacher's Relation to the Sunday School and the Young Life of the Church (1910).
- Hymns and Hymnwriters of the Church (1911).
- Methodism and Higher Education in Tennessee (1913).
- Dr. George H. Detwiler, Pastor and Preacher (1914).
- The Hand Of God In American History (1923)
- Providence, Prayer and Power: Studies in the Philosophy, Psychology and Dynamics of the Christian Religion (1926).
- The South's Greatest Teacher of Boys: An Appreciation of the Character and Work of the Late Professor William Robert Webb of Tennessee (1928).
- Henry Beach Carré: An Appreciation of the Character and Life Work of One of Vanderbilt University's Noblest Sons and One of the Christian Church's Wisest Moral and Religious Leaders (1928).
- A Heaven Within the Hearts of Men: A Tribute of Appreciation and Love to Benjamin Newton Duke.

== Secondary source ==
- Lester Hubert Colloms, Wilbur Fisk Tillett, Christian educator (Cloister Press, 1949).
