= Sir Cyril Wyche, 1st Baronet =

British diplomat

Sir Cyril Wyche Bt

Envoy Extraordinary and Plenipotentiary of Great Britain to Russia
- In office 1741–1744
- Preceded by: Edward Finch
- Succeeded by: The Earl of Hyndford

Envoy Extraordinary of Great Britain to Lower Saxony
- In office 1713–1741
- Preceded by: John Wyche
- Succeeded by: James Cope

Personal details
- Born: c. 1695
- Died: 1756 Tangstedt, Duchy of Holstein
- Spouse: Anne von Wedderkop
- Relations: Sir Peter Wyche (grandfather)
- Children: 4
- Parent(s): John Wyche; Bethesda Savage

Sir Cyril Wyche, 1st Baronet (c. 1695 – 1756) was a British diplomat who served as Envoy Extraordinary to Hamburg and as Envoy Extraordinary and Minister Plenipotentiary to the Russian Empire.

== Early life ==
He was the only son and heir of Bethesda (née Savage) Wyche and John Wyche of Hockwold cum Wilton, Envoy Extraordinary at Hamburg and a daughter Sophia who married Dr Thomas Thomas, Rector of Peterborough. He was the grandson of Sir Peter Wyche (the English Ambassador to Russia and Poland), the great-grandson of Sir Peter Wyche (the British Ambassador to the Ottoman Empire) and the grand-nephew of Sir Cyril Wyche, MP and Chief Secretary for Ireland.

== Career ==
At the age of nineteen, he was appointed Chargé d'Affaires at Hamburg by Queen Anne serving from 1713 to 1714 succeeding his father who died on 15 October 1713. Following the succession of George I on 1 August 1714, the new King appointed Resident in 1714, Minister in 1725, and Envoy Extraordinary to Lower Saxony. While at Hamburg, his secretary, Mattheson, "had Handel for his music-master, and was himself a fine player on the harpsicord."

On 20 December 1729, Wyche was created baronet of Chewton in the County of Somerset, in the Baronetage of Great Britain. He also served as High Sheriff of Norfolk from 1729 to 1730. In 1741, he was appointed Envoy Extraordinary and Minister Plenipotentiary to Russia, serving until 1744.

Arms of Wyche of Chewton

== Personal life ==
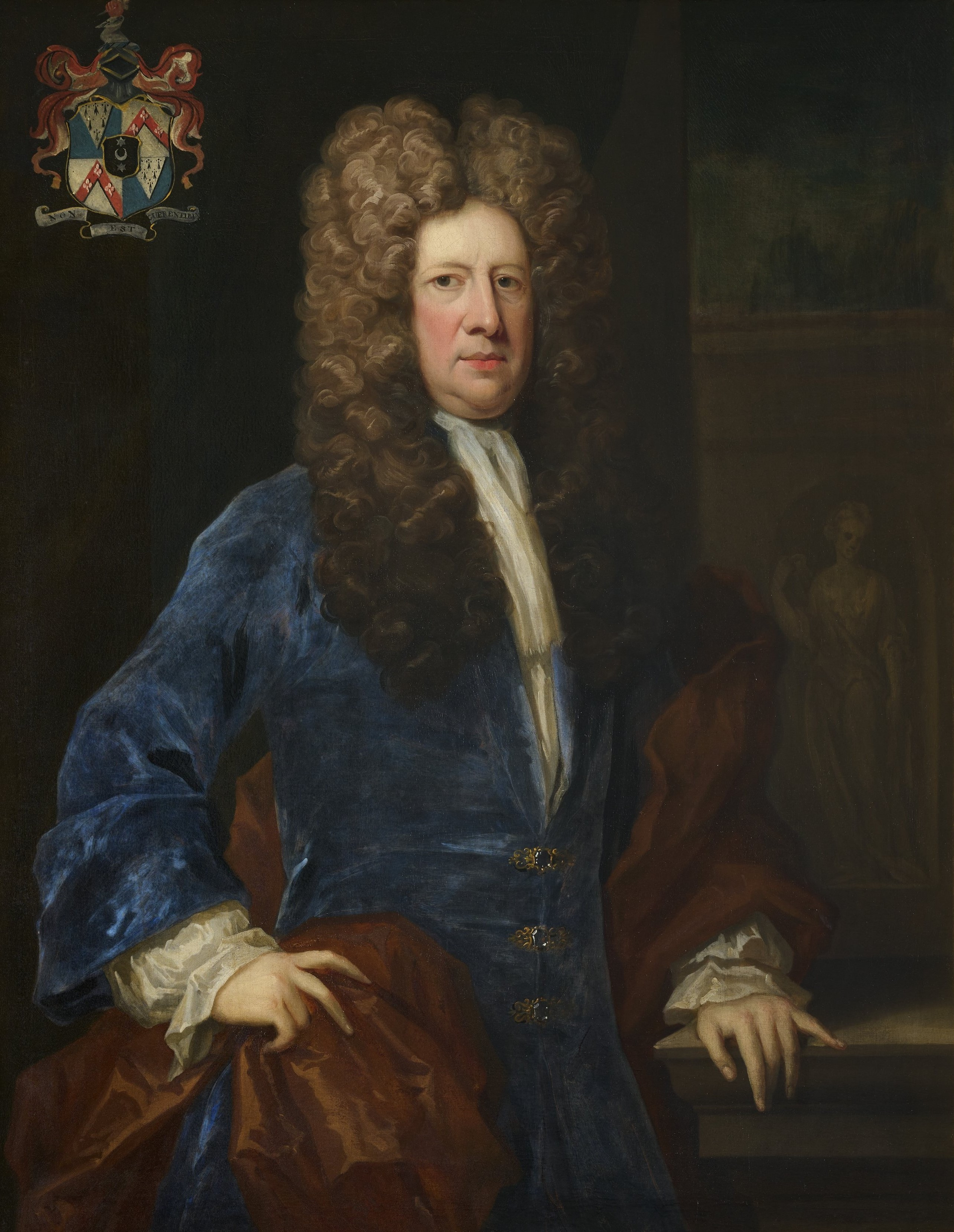
Sir Cyril Wyche, grand-uncle and namesake of Sir Cyril Wyche, 1st Baronet

In 1714, Wyche was married to Anne von Wedderkop, daughter of Magnus von Wedderkop, Prime Minister to the Duke of Holstein. As her dowry, her father gifted his property of Tangstedt. Her brother was Gottfriend von Wedderkop. Together, they were the parents of two sons and two daughters:

- Magnus Wyche (d. 1740), an ensign in the British Army who died unmarried.
- John Wyche, who died young.
- Frederike Wyche, who married before 1741, Magnus von Holmer, Councilor of the State to the Duke of Holstein.
- Amelia Wyche.

As Sir Cyril had no surviving sons, the title became extinct upon his death at Tangstedt in 1756. Upon his death, his daughter Frederike inherited Tangstedt in 1756.

Diplomatic posts
| Preceded by John Wyche | Envoy Extraordinary of Great Britain to Lower Saxony; 1713–1741 | Succeeded by James Cope |
| Preceded by Edward Finch | Envoy Extraordinary and Plenipotentiary of Great Britain to Russia; 1741–1744 | Succeeded by The Earl of Hyndford |
Baronetage of Great Britain
| New creation | Baronet (of Chewton); 1729–1745 | Extinct |
| Preceded by Gough baronets | Wyche baronets of Chewton; 20 December 1729 | Succeeded by Robinson baronets |
