= Richard Wyche =

Richard Wyche may refer to:

- Richard of Chichester (1197–1253), or Richard Wyche, saint and Bishop of Chichester
- Richard Wyche (merchant) (1554–1621), London shipowner and merchant
