= John Cloberry =

English soldier and politician

Sir John Cloberry (c. 1625 – January 1688) was an English soldier and politician who sat in the House of Commons at various times between 1660 and 1685.

Cloberry was the son of John Cloberry of Bradstone, Devon, and his second wife Catharine Drake, daughter of George Drake of Spratshayes, Littleham. He was studying at the Middle Temple in 1647. He joined the Commonwealth army after the execution of King Charles in 1649 and served under General Monck in Scotland.

Cloberry played a key part in the Restoration, being converted to the Royalist cause in 1659. He helped purge the army of Puritan officers and was sent by Monck with Ralph Knight to negotiate with the Committee of Safety in London in 1659. He was also sent later to demand that the secluded members be re-admitted to the Rump Parliament. In 1660, Cloberry was elected Member of Parliament for Launceston and Hedon in the Convention Parliament. There was a double return at Launceston, and when it was resolved in his favour in June 1660, Cloberry chose to sit at Launceston in preference to Hedon He was knighted on 7 June 1660 and given a pension of £600 a year.

Cloberry was elected MP for Winchester in the two elections of 1679 and in 1681 and sat until 1685.

Cloberry died at the age of 63 and was buried in Winchester Cathedral on 31 January 1688.

Cloberry married firstly Margaret Erlisman, widow of John Erlisman of Calbourne, Isle of Wight and daughter of Robert Riggs of Fareham. He married secondly Anne Wyche, widow of Nathaniel Wyche, merchant of Surat, India and daughter of William Cranmer, merchant adventurer of Rotterdam. His daughters married Sir Charles Holte and William Bromley.
