= Bengt Bergt =

German politician (born 1982)

Bengt Bergt MdB

Member of the Bundestag for Segeberg – Stormarn-Mitte
- In office 26 September 2021 – 2025

Personal details
- Born: 7 May 1982 (age 44) Luckenwalde, Germany (then East Germany)
- Party: SPD

Bengt Axel Bergt (born 7 May 1982) is a German politician of the Social Democratic Party (SPD) who served as member of the Bundestag for Segeberg – Stormarn-Mitte from 2021 to 2025.

== Early life and career ==
Bergt was born in Luckenwalde.

From 2015 to 2021, Bergt worked for Nordex. During that time, he served as deputy chair of the works council and as chair of the European Works Council from 2020 to 2021.

== Political career ==
Bergt became a member of the German Bundestag in the 2021 German federal election, representing the Segeberg – Stormarn-Mitte district. In parliament, he served on the Committee on Climate Action and Energy and the Committee on Petitions.

Within his parliamentary group, Bergt belonged to the Parliamentary Left, a left-wing movement.

== Other activities ==
- Federal Network Agency for Electricity, Gas, Telecommunications, Post and Railway (BNetzA), Alternate Member of the Advisory Board (2022–2025)
- German Industry Initiative for Energy Efficiency (DENEFF), Member of the Parliamentary Advisory Board

== Personal life ==
Bergt was a drummer in a punk band.
