= Thomas Skinner (Lord Mayor of London, 1596) =

British politician (1531–1596)

Sheriff of the City of London
- In office 1588–1588 Serving with John Ketcher
- Preceded by: Robert House; William Elkin
- Succeeded by: Hugh Ofley; Richard Saltonstall

Lord Mayor of London
- In office 1596 – 30 December 1596
- Preceded by: Stephen Slaney
- Succeeded by: Henry Billingsley

Personal details
- Born: c. 1531 Saffron Walden, Essex
- Died: 30 December 1596

Thomas Skinner (died 30 December 1596) was a master of the Worshipful Company of Clothworkers and a London Alderman. He was elected Sheriff in 1587 and Lord Mayor of London in 1596. He gave to several hospitals in and about London.

== Early life ==
Skinner was the son of John Skinner, of Saffron Waldron, and married Blanche, daughter of William Watson, merchant to Queen Elizabeth I.

== Public service ==
In 1588, Skinner was Sheriff, conjointly with John Catcher, and succeeded Catcher in the Aldermanry of Cripplegate when Catcher was discharged due to financial difficulties. Skinner removed from Bishopsgate, where he had been elected on 28 September 1584 as Master of the Worshipful Company of Clothworkers.

In November or December 1588, Alderman Skinner was detained in custody for disobedience to an Order of the Queen-in-Council, and was suspected to be one of those that upon retirement out of the City of London, or some other cause, refused to contribute what was allotted him towards Her Majesty's loan from the City.

In 1596, Queen Elizabeth interfered with the ordinary course of election of the Lord Mayor as will be seen by a "Letter (dated 1st Sept., 1596) from the Aldermen to Mr. Alderman Skinner informing him of Her Majesty's desire that Mr. Alderman Billingsley should not be elected to the office of Lord Mayor for the following year, and requesting him to repair to London not later than the 7th or 9th of September to confer with them touching his election to that office", which he accordingly did, and was elected Lord Mayor, but died in office on 30 December of the same year.

During Skinner's year of office the City was threatened with a famine. The citizens generally were in a poverty-stricken state, so much so that many who had been well off had to considerably reduce their expenditure, whilst others had to relinquish their trades and break up their households; and although wheat was offered at a very moderate price, many were too poor to purchase any.

At this time the Queen applied to the City to provide ten ships as part of the City's contribution towards the Anglo-Spanish War. Earlier in the year, the Queen had made demands upon the Londoners for soldiers to assist her to reinforce the town of Flushing in the Netherlands, which as usual had been complied with, but the demand for ships at the close of the year had to be refused. The City's reply to the Queen's Council set forth the utter inability of the citizens, however ever willing they might be, to supply more ships. "They had already expended on sea service alone, and irrespective of their disbursements in 1588 [the Armada year] no less a sum than 100,000 marks within the last few years, so that the Lords of the Council would see that the citizens had not been wanting in good will and affection towards that service".

The City was in debt to the extent of £14,000 and unable to assist the Queen.

== Death and legacy ==
In his will, Skinner left the sum of £20 to the Clothworkers Company for a dinner after attending his funeral, and to the several hospitals in and about London £120 to be equally divided among them. He was also a liberal benefactor to Emmanuel College, Cambridge.

John Stow says that he was buried in the Church of St. Mary Magdalen, Milk Street, and that a handsome monument erected to his memory bore the following inscription:—"Here lieth ye Corpes of Thomas Skynner late Citizen & Alderman of London, borne at Saffron Walden in Essex who in the 65 yeare of his age & on the 30 day of Decebr A Dm 1596 being then Lo Mayor of this Citye deptd this Life leaving behinde him 3 Sonnes & 3 daughters."

Two of his sons, John and Thomas, were knighted on the coronation of James I, at Whitehall, 23 July 1603.

== See also ==
- List of Lord Mayors of London
- List of Sheriffs of London
