= Henry Billingsley =

English scholar and alderman (c. 1538–1606)

Sir Henry Billingsley

Lord Mayor of London
- In office 1596–1597
- Preceded by: Thomas Skinner
- Succeeded by: Richard Saltonstall

Personal details
- Died: 22 November 1606
- Occupation: Merchant, translator

Sir Henry Billingsley (c. 1538 – 22 November 1606) was an English scholar and translator, merchant, chief Customs officer for the Port of London in the high age of late Elizabethan piracy, and moneylender, several times Master of the Haberdashers' Company, an alderman, Sheriff and Lord Mayor of London, and twice Member of Parliament for the City. His 1570 translation (with exemplifications) of Euclid's Geometry, the first from Greek into English, with a lengthy opening essay by Dr John Dee, was a classic of its time and a landmark in mathematical publishing. It appeared only two years after his translation, from the Latin, of the compendious and seminal Commentary, by the leading Reformation theologian Pietro Martire Vermigli, on the Epistle of St Paul to the Romans, which had been dedicated by its author to the Reformation scholar Sir Anthony Cooke. Both of these important publications were printed by John Daye. Billingsley was for long associated with St Thomas's Hospital in London and was a prominent, worthy and wealthy London citizen, reflecting the examples of his stepfathers Sir Martin Bowes and Thomas Seckford. He was listed in 1617 as a deceased member of the Elizabethan Society of Antiquaries.

== Early life ==
Henry was the third son (after William and Richard) of William Billingsley, Haberdasher of London and an assay master (1546–53) of the Tower Mint, and his wife, Elizabeth Harlowe. He entered St. John's College, Cambridge with a foundation scholarship in 1551. He is also said to have developed an interest in mathematics at the University of Oxford under David Whytehead, who left England in 1553.

His father died in 1553, and in the next year his mother remarried to Sir Martin Bowes, a man of high civic profile, Senior Warden of the Goldsmiths' Company, former mint master and former lord mayor. Henry did not take his degree but was apprenticed to a London merchant. He became a freeman of the Worshipful Company of Haberdashers by patrimony in 1560, and married his first wife, Elizabeth Bourn, in 1562. Their first child died in early infancy, but the future heir, the second Harry Billingsley, was christened on 20 January 1563/64 at St Peter upon Cornhill. In 1564 he purchased the manor of Butleigh in Somerset (a former possession of Glastonbury Abbey), and sold it to the lessee in 1569.

== Writings and publications ==
In 1567 Sir Martin Bowes died, and Henry's mother again remarried, this time (5 February 1566/67) to the Master of Requests in Ordinary, Thomas Seckford, patron of the cartographer Christopher Saxton. It is clear from the Port Books of London that Billingsley was actively engaged in trade through the later 1560s, no doubt operating through his agents. It is to this period, when he had become master in his own household, that the story of his hospitality towards David Whytehead must belong. It is also the time in which his literary and scholarly work came to fruition, and in which he was collaborating with Dr John Dee.

The connection with Whytehead is described by Anthony à Wood in the following words:

"...he became known to an eminent mathematician called Whytehead, then or lately, a fryar of the order of St Augustine in Oxon... when the said Whytehead was put to his shifts, after the demolition of his house in the latter end of Hen. 8 he was received by Henry Billingsley into his family, and by him maintained in his old age in his house in London. In which time he learned mathematics of him, and became so excellent in them, that he went beyond many of his time, whether lay-men, or profess'd scholars."

This story, with its sequel, was handed down to Wood in Oxford at three removes from a physician named Robert Barnes, elected Fellow of Merton College in 1537, who was acquainted with both Whytehead and Billingsley. In fact Whytehead, who had tutored the young Charles Brandon (died 1551), and had been recommended by Thomas Cranmer for the archbishopric of Armagh in 1552, had become a Marian exile in 1553. After taking refuge in Emden, in 1554 he took charge of a congregation in Frankfurt, and, having become involved in the expulsion of John Knox from that group, remained there until 1558, when he returned to England, winning the favour and estimation of Queen Elizabeth. He was on the commission to reform the liturgy, but refused a benefice, preferring to travel about wherever he felt needed. He was sequestered in March 1563/64 for refusing to subscribe, being anti-episcopalian. He died in 1571. As Billingsley married in 1562, and completed his scholarly publications in 1570, that is the period of their association.

=== Commentary of Peter Martyr (1568) ===
The Florentine, Pietro Martire Vermigli, one of the principal luminaries of the English Reformation, was driven out of England in 1553. His interpretative commentaries, embodying the reformist theology and the substance of his teaching, were written in Latin. His Commentaries on the Epistle of St Paul to the Romans were published in Latin at Basle in 1558. The translation in the name of Henry Billingsley is a most compendious work containing some 456 folios (i.e. about 900 pages) of English text declaring and expounding Paul's message that the revelation of the Gospel was sent into the world in order that it should be believed, for the salvation of mankind in all nations, as a mystery hidden since the beginning of the world. The translation itself is a monument of the Reformation. It was printed as of 31 August 1568 by John Daye, "dwelling over Aldersgate beneath S. Martins", '"Cum Gratia et Privilegio Regiae Maiestatis per Decennium".

The original work was dedicated by Vermigli to Sir Anthony Cooke, a reformation scholar, former tutor to King Edward VI. Leaving England in 1554 Cooke travelled in Europe as a Marian exile with Sir John Cheke and Sir Thomas Wroth, and returned to England on the accession of Elizabeth. By this dedication, dated in Latin in 1558, Vermigli (who died in 1562) addressed the hope of a reformed settlement in England under Elizabeth. Cooke died in 1576, and therefore Billingsley's translation of 1568, which included Vermigli's Epistola Nuncupatoria, renewed the homage paid to the dedicatee as one of the living instruments of the Edwardian Reformation.

In Billingsley's English, Vermigli addressed these word to Cooke:

"It is a griefe unto me to thinke that that most noble wit, most sacred brest, and incredible piety of that famous King Edward the vj. of that name, your most dear pupill, is so sodeinely taken from us. It is a griefe unto me that so many English men, being of great fame and renoum, as well for theyr piety as for theyr knowledge and nobility, are by voluntary exile for religion sake, dispersed throughout externe and straunge countreys: and they which at home were counted moste noble, and heroicall, doe now wander abrode as men obscure, abiect, and in a manner unknowne to all men... I for my part doubtles have, ever since that the time that I dwelt in England, borne a singular love and no smal or vulgar affection towards you, both for your singular piety and learning, and also for the worthy office which you faythfully and with great renoune executed in the Christian publike wealth, in instructing Edward, that most holy King and most worthy to be beloved, whose wit, goodness, religion, and eyther vertues heroical, yea rather Christian, may indede be touched, but can never be praysed according to theyr desert."

Cooke's eldest daughter (Mildred Cooke) was the wife of William Cecil, 1st Baron Burghley, a pupil of Cheke's, who had first married Cheke's sister; her sister Anna married Sir Nicholas Bacon (Lord Keeper); the third, Elizabeth, married first Sir Thomas Hoby (died 1566), and then John Russell; another (Katherine Cooke) was the wife of Sir Henry Killigrew, brother of that Sir John Killigrew whose daughter Katherine later married Sir Henry Billingsley.

=== Euclid's Elements (1570) ===
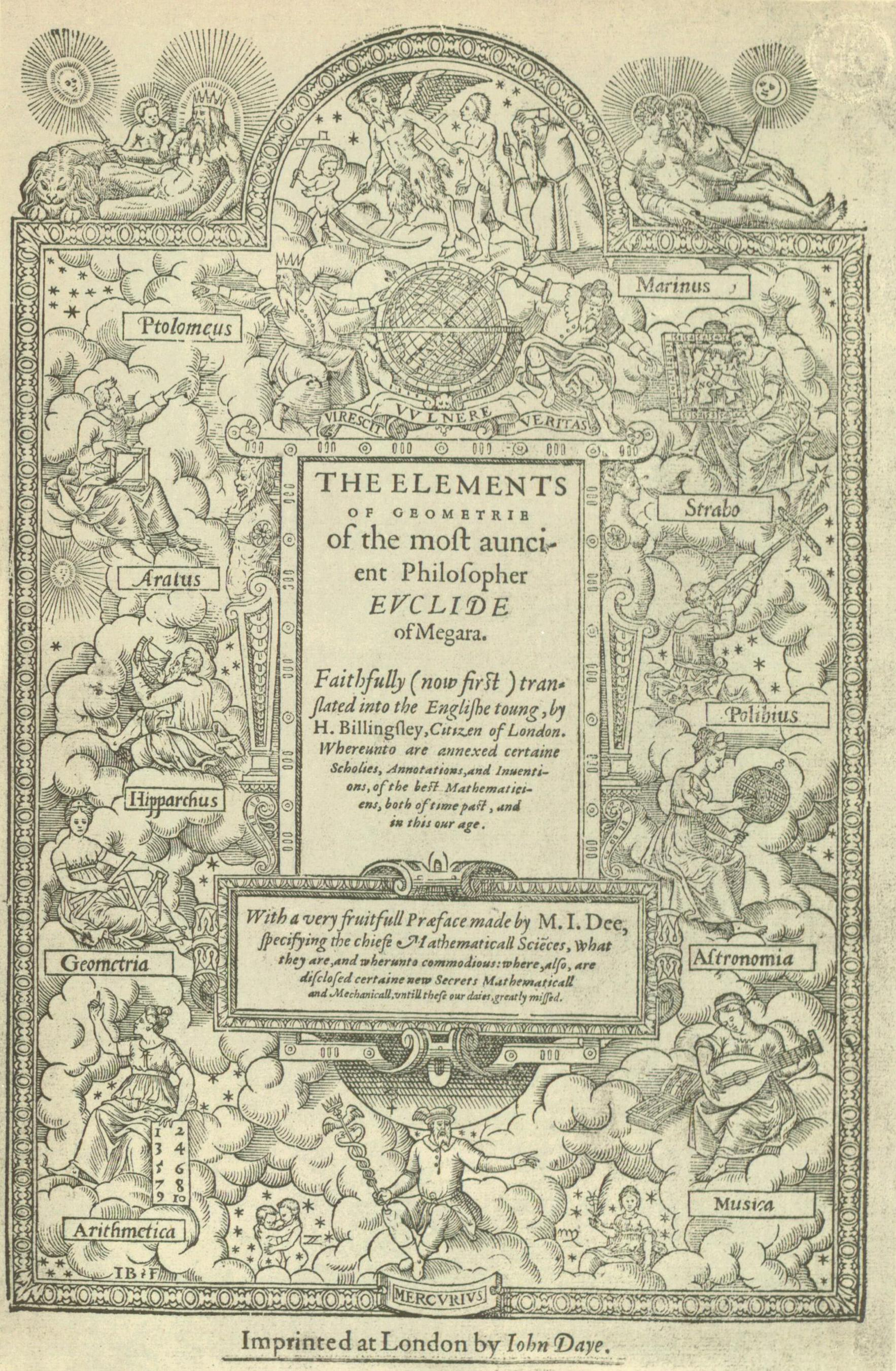
The frontispiece of Sir Henry Billingsley's first English version of Euclid's Elements, 1570

The considerable labour involved in the translation from Latin of the Commentaries, and of their being made ready for the press in 1568, is all the more remarkable in that it preceded by only two years the publication of his more lasting monumental work, the first full English translation of The Elements of Geometry of Euclid of Alexandria, translated from a Greek recension. Indeed, in his Euclid, Billingsley stated that he had also completed, ready for the press, an English translation of the De Sphericis of Theodosius, although that is not known to have survived. The production of these scholarly works, brilliantly carried over from two academic languages and in two disciplines of thought, was somewhat prodigious.

Billingsley opens his Euclid with the following remarks:

"There is (gentle Reader) nothing (the word of God set onely apart) which so much beautifieth and adorneth the soule and minde of man, as doth the knowledge of good artes and sciences: as the knowledge of naturall and morall Philosophie. The one setteth before our eyes, the creatures of God, both in the heavens above, and in the earth beneath: in which as in a glasse, we beholde the exceding maiestie and wisdome of God, in adorning and beautifying them, as we see: in geving unto them such wonderfull and manifolde proprieties, and naturall workinges, and that so diversly and in such varietie: farther in maintaining and conserving them continually, whereby to praise and adore him, as by S. Paule we are taught. The other teacheth us rules and preceptes of vertue, how, in common life amongest men, we ought to walke uprightly: what dueties pertaine to our selves, what pertaine to the government or good order both of an housholde, and also of a citie or common wealth."

The Euclid (which the title-page mistakenly attributes to the philosopher Euclid of Megara, a common confusion in the Renaissance period) is not merely a translation, renowned for its clarity and accuracy, of its Greek exemplar but also an extremely extensive collection of notes, illustrations and demonstrations of every stage of the discourse. The work included a lengthy "Mathematicall preface" by John Dee, which surveyed all the existing branches of pure and applied mathematics, and he provided notes and "inventions mathematicall", and other supplementary material after Chapter 10, where Dee is suitably acknowledged. The work was printed in folio by John Day, "Cum Privilegio", and included several three-dimensional fold-up diagrams illustrating solid geometry. Though not the very first, it was one of the first books to include such a feature.

As to authorship, some have thought that Dee or Whytehead were the true authors. Augustus De Morgan suggested that the translation was solely the work of Dee; but Dr Dee, in his miscellaneous pamphlets, specifically attributes the main work of the Euclid to Billingsley. Anthony à Wood, who received his story through Thomas Allen and Brian Twyne, clearly attributed the translation to Billingsley:

"When Whytehead died he gave his scholar all his mathematical observations that he had made and collected, together with his notes on Euclid's Elements, which he had with great pains drawn up and digested. Afterwards our author Billingsley translated the said Elements into English, and added thereunto plain declarations and examples, manifold additions, scholia's, annotations and inventions, from the best mathematicians both in time past, and in the age he lived in. Which being done, he published them..."

Since the book was published in 1570, and Whytehead died in 1571, the collation of his notes (if it occurred as described) must have been a living collaboration. Billingsley in his Errata stated that he had to correct the pages himself with the printer, and to list further corrigenda, because John Day had no corrector acquainted with the subject-matter.

Billingsley's own annotated copy of the Greek Euclid, in the library of Princeton University, provided the evidence for G.B. Halsted's 1879 study affirming that the translation was not from the well-known Latin translation of Campanus, and was Billingsley's own work. This 1533 Greek version was the edition of Simon Grynaeus, the Editio princeps of the complete Greek text of Euclid's Elements. Grynaeus was Professor of Greek at the University of Basel, and he tells us that his text was a collation of a manuscript sent from Venice by Lazarus Bayfius (Lazare de Baïf, French ambassador in Venice) with another sent from Paris by John Ruellius (Jean Ruel), with (as appears from his notations) some reference to Bartolomeo Zamberti's Latin version from the Greek produced in 1505 in Venice. Grynaeus incorporated the Commentary on Book I by Proclus, from a manuscript provided by John Claymond, President of Magdalen College, Oxford and of Corpus Christi College, Oxford. Grynaeus was a reformist, a schoolfellow of Philip Melanchthon, and when visiting England in 1531 gained his introduction to Sir Thomas More with the help of a letter from Erasmus. He dedicated his edition to Cuthbert Tunstall, the Catholic humanist bishop of Durham who held office almost uninterruptedly from 1530 until 1559, when he was deposed for refusing to support the appointment of Matthew Parker.

== Civic career ==
=== Public standing ===
Billingsley prospered as a merchant in the City. From 1572 until at least 1579 he was collector of customs for strangers' (i.e. foreign merchants') goods. His first wife Elizabeth died in childbirth in 1577 and was buried at St Katherine Coleman, leaving Henry with several children in minority. His second marriage, to Bridget daughter of Sir Christopher Draper, established him in a kinship network of civic magnates. He purchased Penhow Castle in 1581 for his son Henry, who was then establishing himself in Monmouthshire. Having served two years as city Auditor, 1580–82, he took his first term as Master of the Haberdashers in 1584-1585, simultaneously being chosen Sheriff of London in 1584, in the mayoralty of Sir Thomas Pullyson, and began his career as alderman (for Tower Ward) in 1585, as his wife's brother-in-law Wolstan Dixie succeeded to the mayoral chair. He was chosen for Parliament for the City of London in that year, but did not sit. In November 1586 Billingsley's mother, Dame Elizabeth, died and was buried in the vault of Sir Martin Bowes at St Mary Woolnoth.

=== Freights ===
In 1587 Sir Henry obtained, and his son took up, a grant of nearly 12,000 acres in County Limerick as an undertaker in the Plantation of Munster. Following the capture of the carrack São Filipe in that year, the Privy Council wrote to Sir John Gilbert, Sir Francis Godolphin, John Hawkins and alderman Billingsley, esquires, concerning Sir Francis Drake's booty, conveying her Majesty's thanks for their troubles in fulfilling her instructions to bring Drake's ship and its freight to safekeeping in London. With Peter Osborne and Edward Fenton, in 1588 Billingsley was assigned by Lord Burghley and Walsingham to the control and audit of the financial accounts of the expedition of Drake and Sir John Norreys against the Spanish in 1589. Examples of his correspondence with Lord Burghley in December 1589 illustrate his proceedings at that time. In February 1589 he furnished Lord Burghley with a valuation of Sir Martin Frobisher's prizes.

=== The new Customs at the Quays ===
Bridget Billingsley died in 1588, and Billingsley married (for the third time) to Katherine, daughter of Sir John Killigrew of Arwenack, Cornwall, and widow of a London gentleman. Dame Katherine was, for a decade, the consort of Billingsley at the height of his civic prominence. As a daughter and sister of the governors of Pendennis Castle, and a granddaughter of Philip Wolverston (of Woolverstone, Suffolk), she brought suitably maritime connections to the affair.

At the reorganization of the Customs, Billingsley became one of Elizabeth I's four customs collectors in 1589, taking Thomas Smythe's former office as Customer but not his responsibilities as Farmer: he was chief Customer for the Port of London in 1590. He showed himself an efficient and productive officer. With Sir John Hawkins and others, Billingsley, Thomas Middleton and Richard Carmarthen of the Custom House were attached to a commission in 1591 to oversee the division of "prizes taken at sea", including the calculation of customs dues; and in 1592, when he, with Sir George Barne, produced a schedule of the goods brought in the Tiger, he was in consultation over the spoil from the Madre de Deus. He and Richard Carmarthen applied themselves to the revision of the rateable values, many of which remained unamended since Queen Mary's time. As alderman of London, together with Sir Richard Martin, he was admitted to Gray's Inn on 22 February 1590/91. Serving his second term as Master of the Haberdashers in 1590-1591, in 1591 he founded three scholarships for poor students at St. John's College, Cambridge. In the next year he transferred his aldermanry to the Candlewick ward. The grant of the whole of "Le Key" and "Le Wharf", called the Old Wool Key, to John Fortescue, Chancellor of the Exchequer, and Henry Billingsley in 34 Elizabeth (1591/92) preceded construction works at the Custom House.

=== The mayoralty, 1596-1597 ===
Billingsley was elected President of St Thomas' Hospital in 1594. He was again Master of the Haberdashers' Company in 1595-1596, and as his term came to an end the Court of Aldermen, following their customs of precedence, proposed him for the office of Lord Mayor. In September 1596 Queen Elizabeth expressed her wish that he should not serve for that year: therefore, despite the protestations of Lord Burghley and others, Sir Thomas Skinner was chosen. Skinner, however, died in office on 30 December, and Billingsley, who sat in the Custom-house on Twelfth-night following with the mayoral sword on the table before him, succeeded him for the completion of the greater part of the mayoral term 1596-97, receiving his knighthood early in the following year. The Sheriffs were John Watts and Richard Godard. According to a speech given by the Recorder, Sir John Croke, in January 1596/97, "In place of the governor lately taken from us we have proceeded to the election of another, before this time eligible to the place, and only forborne for that he was sequestered to some other service for Her Majesty, and yet now, Her Majesty vouchsafing to spare him from herself to serve the city, and having chosen him according to the charters of Her Majesty and her most noble progenitors granted to us... we present him here to be admitted." Further speeches, one of 6 February 1596/97, "Sur presenting Alderman Billingsley a sa Majesty", and another on the election of his successor, are similarly preserved.

At the time of his election, the end of 1596, the resources of the city were exceedingly drained, and a famine was threatened. (Billingsley and Richard Saltonstall were proposing a new joint stock venture of merchants to provision the city with corn, and to effect an import of wheat and rye to be exempted from customs.) Over and above the costs demanded for the Armada year of 1588, the city had been called upon for contributions exceeding £100,000 in recent years towards the needs of sea service. During 1596 the city had furnished some 600 men for the defence of Boulogne in connection with the Spanish capture of Calais. In December the Privy Council further required the city to provide ten ships for the public service, to which a committee responded with what was tantamount to a refusal, pleading the great poverty of the citizens, not to mention their dissatisfaction with the distribution of the spoils from the expedition to Cádiz - a venture towards which they had contributed without gaining any relief upon their debt. In response, the queen commanded the livery companies to refrain from holding their accustomed feasts during the summer of 1597, and to apply half the money saved to the relief of the destitute citizenry: which was accordingly done.

=== Later years ===
Sir Henry's wife Dame Katherine died in 1598, and he remarried to Elizabeth Monslow. At that time, with his son Henry, he raised a fine upon Siston Court, Gloucestershire, which became his son's family seat. His second son, William, died in 1599. Dame Elizabeth Billingsley died in 1603, and Sir Henry made his fifth and last marriage to Susan Tracy (widow of the Ecclesiastical Registrar Edward Barker).

Sir Henry sat in parliament for London in 1604 until his death in 1606, served his fourth and final term as Master Haberdasher in 1605-1606, and was in office as alderman and as President of St Thomas's Hospital at his death. By his will of 1606 he endowed a scholarship at Emmanuel College, Cambridge. He also made a grant of £200 for relief of the poor of his parish which, however, failed to be implemented. At the time of his death his London dwelling was beside the churchyard in St Katherine Coleman by Aldgate, a lifetime occupancy of which he left to his widow Dame Susan Billingsley. (John Strype says, "He dwelt at Blank Chappelton between Algate and the place where Fan-church formerly stood.") His sons Sir Henry and Thomas Billingsley (both of whom he had already advanced) were his executors.

=== Estate affairs ===
Among his holdings at death was his family's Leicestershire manor of Cotesbach, with appurtenances and with more than 1,000 acres in various parishes of Leicestershire, held in capite by knight's service, although it was occupied by John Quarles until entered upon by the younger Sir Henry late in 1607. The Will also refers to rent of coal mines payable to Sir Henry at the rate of £100 every six months, according to an indenture of lease. This may refer to the mines of Kingswood, a former royal forest or chase near Bristol, over which there were long continued disputes between the verderers, borderers and mining interests during the time of James I. Henry Lord Berkeley, Keeper of the Chase since 1558, claimed 1,000 acres as belonging to his manor of Bitton, and had allowed private mining interests to develop there: Billingsley, whose manors of Siston and Mangotsfield lay against Kingswood, had done likewise. The king granted all mining rights to his own lessee in 1609, who was thoroughly obstructed: a Survey conducted by John Norden in 1615 showed that large amounts of coal were being extracted annually, and listed Sir Henry Billingsley (the younger) as holding 810 acres there, the third largest private claim.

=== Death and monument ===
Sir Henry Billingsley was buried at the close of 1606 beside his first wife, Elizabeth (who died in 1577), at the church of St Katherine Coleman in Aldgate. Their names were inscribed on a fair floor slab beside the communion table, near to the place where a small alabaster monument to Elizabeth Billingsley was fixed to the wall on the north side of the chancel, with her own inscription and a Latin verse epitaph, written in the person (and presumably by the hand) of her husband. (By 1929, her tablet had relocated to St Olave Hart Street.) By indenture dated 1616, Dame Susan (the surviving widow) granted an annuity or yearly rent-charge of £6.13s.4d arising from the former priory of Clifford, Herefordshire, for the relief of the poor in St Thomas' Hospital, London. At the same time she granted an annuity of £13.6s.8d, from the same source, for the relief and further maintenance of poor children in Christ's Hospital, London.

== Family ==
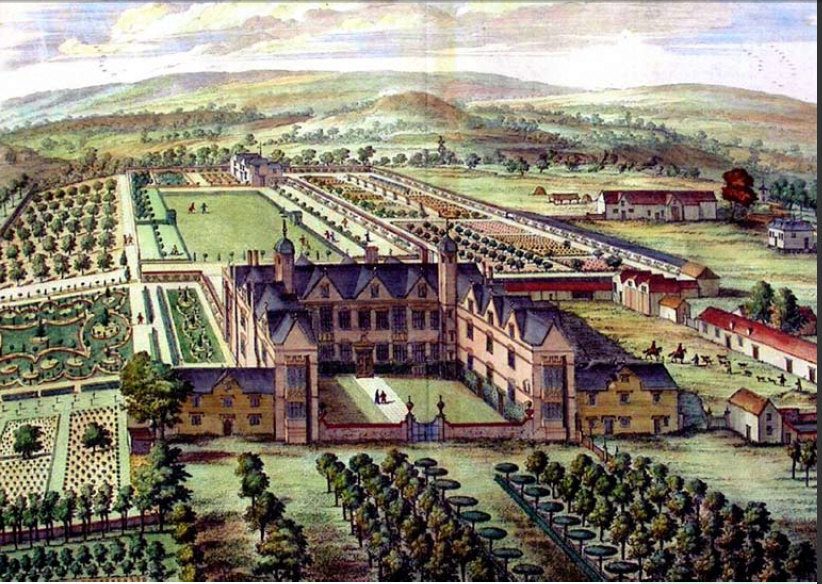
Siston Court in 1712

By the remarriages of his mother after his father's death, Henry Billingsley became the stepson successively of Sir Martin Bowes (died 1567), and then of Thomas Seckford, Esquire (died 1587). His mother died in 1586.

Henry Billingsley married five times and had at least ten children.

- His first wife (married 1562) was Elizabeth Boorne (died July 1577, a daughter and heir of Henry Boorn of Yorkshire), to whom the majority of his children were born. Her monumental epitaph at St Katherine Coleman church is recorded by John Aubrey. Her wall tablet, apparently the earlier monument, indicated that she had ten children (of whom three were daughters) and died in childbirth of an eleventh. Among the children were:
  - (The first child), Harry Billingsley, infant, christened 3 January 1562/63 at St Peter upon Cornhill, London; buried there, 7 January 1562/63.
  - The son and heir, Sir Henry Billingsley, christened 20 January 1563/64 at St Peter upon Cornhill, who matriculated 1579 a fellow-commoner from St John's College, Cambridge, and was admitted to Gray's Inn 1581/82, was aged upwards of 40 in 1606. Billingsley was Sheriff of Monmouthshire in 1598. He first married a daughter of Henry Matthew of Radyr in Glamorgan, whom Matthew named as his (living) "daughter Billingsley" in his will made in 1600. She was a near kinswoman of Edmond Matthew, who, having incurred a debt of £8000 for Billingsley soon after 1603, in compensation conveyed very substantial estates in Glamorgan to him before April 1607. He was knighted in 1603, and by August 1604 had re-married to Mary Killigrew, relict of Robert Henley Esq., at which time Sir Henry and Dame Mary became engaged in a Chancery suit concerning legacies, against her brother John Killigrew. (Killigrew, from the Fleet, in 1605 wrote of him, "though he be younge, his fatness is suche as there will not be fower yeares purchase geven for his life.") In 1613 they had a bargain and sale of land in St Fagan's parish, Glamorgan (toward the liquidation of Edmond Mathew's debt), and in that year they entertained Queen Anne at Siston Court. After a lengthy suit, in 1618 Edmond Mathew recovered some of his lands when the court of Chancery considered whether Billingsley and William Mathew had colluded to defraud him of Landaff and Radir for about half their value. William Mathew was still petitioning in 1624. Siston and Penhow passed to Billingsley's son Henry by 1623 after the heir's marriage to Sarah Rogers. Sir Henry is said to have died on 17 November 1628, leaving his heir Henry aged 30; Dame Mary is described as his widow in a Chancery suit brought against her by Symon Killigrew in 1628.
    There were several Henrys in this family at that time, with whom Sir Henry is sometimes confused.
  - William Billingsley entered St John's College, Cambridge as a scholar in 1579, taking BA in 1582-83, becoming fellow in 1585-86, and MA 1586. He married Blaunche daughter of Francis Gunter (of Albury, Hertfordshire) at Ss Peter and Paul, Mitcham, Surrey, in September 1594, by whom he had three sons. Blaunche was his sole executrix in his will proved 2 March 1598/99, which describes him as a gentleman of the City of London, and refers to his father Sir Henry Billingsley (four years before the younger Henry was knighted). He was deceased when his father made his will in 1606, mentioning William's children. Blaunche remarried to Francis James, DCL, of Wells (brother of bishop William James), whose will she proved in 1616.
  - Thomas Billingsley, took BA at Catherine Hall, Cambridge in 1582-83, and MA in 1588. He married Elizabeth, daughter of Rowland Hinde (the elder) of Hedsor, Buckinghamshire. He was living on 26 April 1633 when, as sole executor, he swore to administer the probate of the will of his stepmother Dame Susan Billingsley. He made his own will on the following day, which was proved by his widow on 16 May 1633.
  - Richard Billingsley
  - John Billingsley, living 1606, "son of Sir Henry Billingslie, which John was begotten of the body of Katherine his late wife", wrote his step-aunt Dame Bennett Webbe.
  - Elizabeth Billingsley, married the cloth merchant, Sir John Quarles (not to be confused with the later poet John Quarles).
  - Katherine Billingsley.
- His second wife, Bridget (died September 1588), was daughter and coheir of Sir Christopher Draper (lord mayor) of London, and was already twice widowed. Her first husband had been Hugh Unton, or Umpton, citizen and Haberdasher, who died in 1562; her second was Stephen Woodroffe of London (died 1576), brother of Nicholas Woodroffe. The monument of Sir Christopher Draper (who died in 1580), in St Dunstan-in-the-East, bore inscriptions to his sons-in-law, all three of them lords mayors, William Webbe, Wolstan Dixie (died 1594), and Henry Billingsley (whose inscription also mentioned Bridget's son Christopher, son of Stephen Woodroffe). It was destroyed in the Great Fire of 1666. Wolstan Dixie appointed Billingsley an overseer in his will of 1594, and gave him a chain of gold.
- His third wife Katherine Killigrew (died 1598), daughter of Sir John Killigrew and Mary Wolverston, came from the prominent Cornish family whose seat was at Arwenack near Falmouth. She had formerly been married to Robert Trapps, gentleman of London (whose will was proved in November 1587). She died at her house in Fenchurch Street, and was buried in the chancel of St Katherine Coleman church.
- His fourth wife was Elizabeth Monslow, the widow of Rowland Martyn. She made her will on 24 June 1603.
- He was survived by his fifth and last wife, Suzan, daughter of Richard Tracy of Stanway, Gloucestershire, and widow of Edward Barker (died 1602), Registrar for Causes Ecclesiastical. Dame Suzan died on 25 April 1633 and was buried at St Gregory by St Paul's.
