= Nathaniel Wyche =

English merchant

- Born: London, England
- Baptised: 5 August 1607
- Died: 23 May 1659 (aged 51–52); Surat, India
- Spouse: Anne Cranmer (m. 1657)
- Parent(s): Richard Wyche; Elizabeth Saltonstall
- Relatives: Peter Wyche (brother); Richard Saltonstall (grandfather); Peter Wyche (nephew); Cyril Wyche (nephew)

Nathaniel Wyche (1607 – 23 May 1659) was an English merchant and president of the English East India Company.

== Early life ==
Nathaniel was born in 1607 and baptized at Mitcham on 5 August 1607. He was the youngest son of Elizabeth (née Saltonstall) Wyche and Richard Wyche, a director of the East India Company, one of whose elder brothers was Sir Peter Wyche (1593–1643), the British ambassador to the Ottoman Empire (who was knighted by King Charles I in 1626), and his maternal grandfather was Lord Mayor of London Richard Saltonstall. His mother's first cousin, Sir Richard Saltonstall, established a settlement in the Massachusetts Bay Colony in 1630.

== Career ==
A long-time member of the English East India Company, Wyche served in India, including at Masulipatam, from 1627 to 1636 and had been one of the Committees of the United Joint Stock from 1650 to 1654. He was selected as the Company's president in 1658, though he initially turned down the position. He was the first company president of the whole of India, which had previously been divided into four presidencies.

== Personal life ==
In 1657, Wyche was married to Anne (née Cranmer) Slane, who was 26 years his junior, but they had no children. Anne, a widow, was the youngest child of Susanna (née Powell) Cranmer and William Cranmer, a merchant adventurer of Rotterdam.

He died at Surat on 23 May 1659 and was buried in the English Cemetery there. After his death, his widow married Sir John Cloberry, MP for Winchester, a younger son of the Cloberrys of Broadstone in Devon. Together, they had "seven children, of whom only four daughters lived to be married."
