= Gero Storjohann =

German politician (1958–2023)

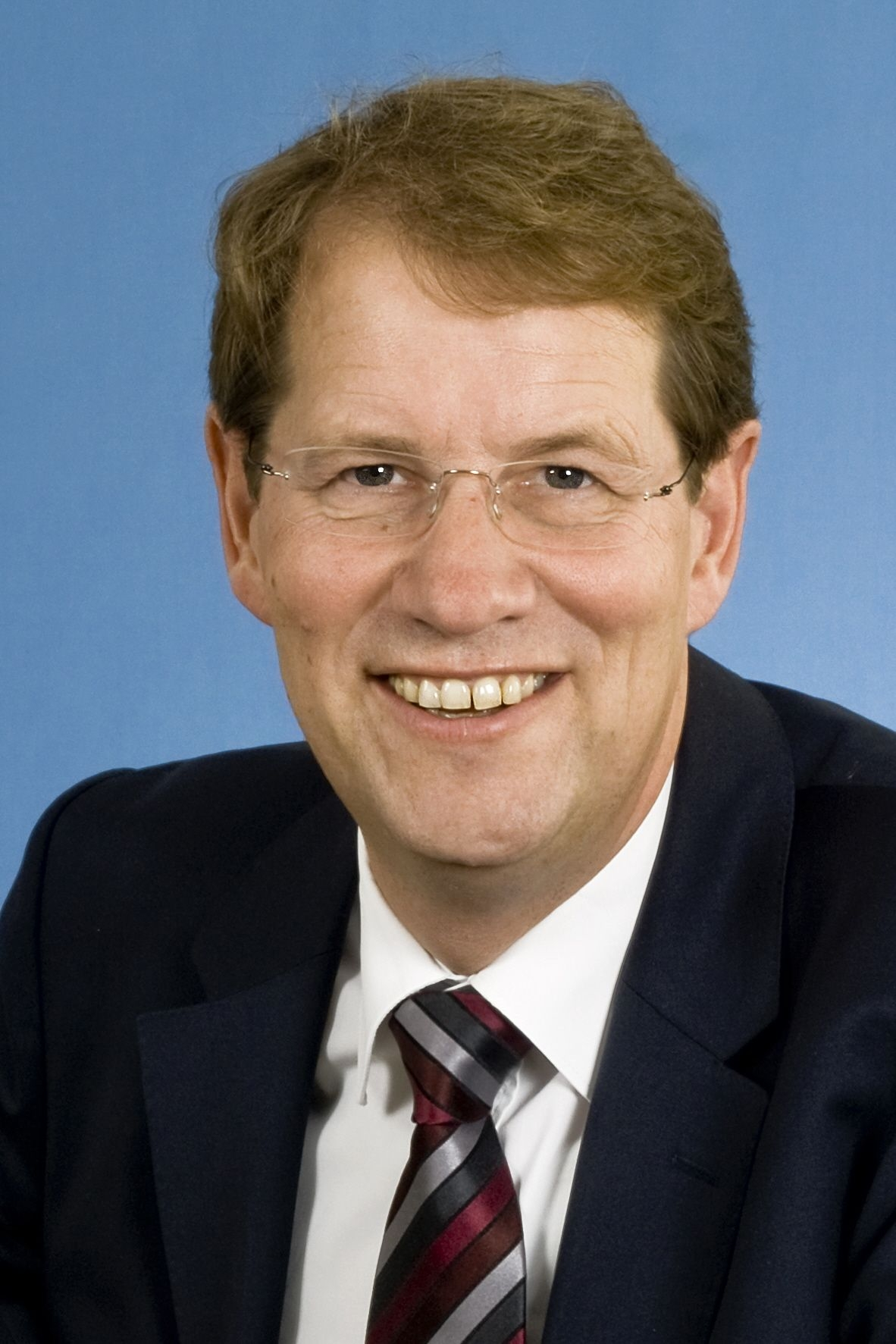

Member of the Bundestag
- In office October 2002 – 29 January 2023
- Succeeded by: Melanie Bernstein
- Constituency: Schleswig-Holstein list (2002–2005); Segeberg – Stormarn-Nord (2005–2013); Segeberg – Stormarn-Mitte (2013–2023)

Member of the Landtag of Schleswig-Holstein
- In office 1994 – 17 October 2002
- Constituency: Segeberg-Mitte (until 2000); List (2000–2002)

Personal details
- Born: 12 February 1958 Bad Segeberg, Schleswig-Holstein, West Germany
- Died: 29 January 2023 (aged 64)
- Party: CDU
- Education: Kiel University of Applied Sciences

Gero Storjohann (12 February 1958 – 29 January 2023) was a German politician who served in the Bundestag from 2002 until his death in 2023. A member of the Christian Democratic Union, Storjohann had served as the vice chairman of the Committee on Petitions from 2005. During his tenure, Storjohann was an advocate for improvements of transportation infrastructure, particularly for bicycles.

== Early life and education ==
Storjohann was born in Bad Segeberg on 12 February 1958. He achieved the Abitur at the Dahlmannschule there. He served as a Bundeswehr soldier from 1978 to 1980. In 1982, he completed vocational training as a wholesale and foreign trade merchant. He then studied at the Fachhochschule Kiel, graduating in business administration in 1987.

== Career ==
From 1988 to 1994 Storjohann worked for Deutsche Bundespost. He joined the Junge Union in 1975 and the Christian Democratic Union in 1977. He served in the Segeberg district, first as head of the Junge Union from 1982 to 1991, as deputy district president (Kreisvorsitzender) from 1989 to 1997, and then as district president. He was a member of the district parliament (Kreistag) from 1990 to 1994.

In 1994, Storjohann was elected into Landtag of Schleswig-Holstein, where he was the CDU's speaker for Wohnungspolitik (housing politics). He was a member of the Landtag until he was elected into the Bundestag in 2002.

Storjohann was elected to the Bundestag in 2002, representing the constituency of Segeberg – Stormarn-Mitte. Storjohann was a member of the committee on petitions, serving as vice chairman from 2005, and the committee on transport and digital infrastructure; on the latter, he was his parliamentary group's rapporteur on road traffic safety and cycling. He focused on the improvement of transportation in Schleswig-Holstein, expansion of bicycle roads and safety of cyclists. Storjohann also chaired the German-Austrian parliamentary friendship group since 2018.

In June 2017, Storjohann voted, against his party's majority, in favor of Germany's introduction of same-sex marriage. Ahead of the CDU's leadership election in 2018, he publicly endorsed Annegret Kramp-Karrenbauer to succeed Angela Merkel as the party's chair.

== Other activities ==
- Federal Network Agency (BNetzA), chairman of the rail infrastructure advisory council (since 2012)
- Deutsche Verkehrswacht, member of the board (2013–2016)
- Europa-Union Deutschland, member

== Personal life ==
Storjohann was married; he and his wife Maren had three sons. The family lived in Seth, Segeberg. He was a passionate cyclist.

From 1 April 2022, Storjohann was treated in intensive care after a severe illness. He remained a member of the Bundestag until his death on 29 January 2023, at age 64. His seat was taken by Melanie Bernstein.
