= George Douglas of Parkhead =

Scottish landowner

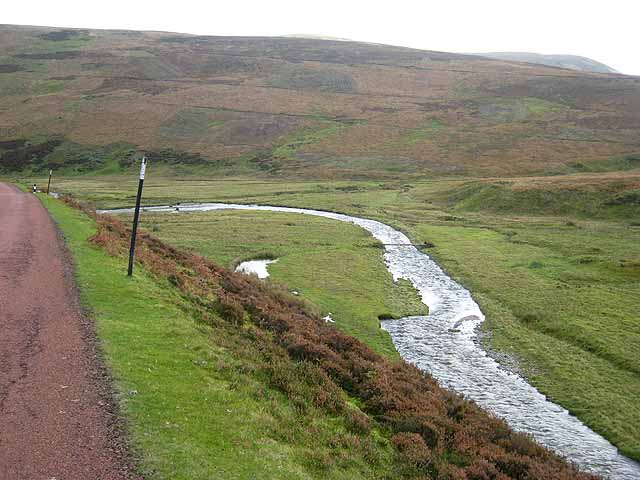
George Douglas of Parkhead was said to have been killed by a landslide at his mine by Shortcleuch water while searching for gold

George Douglas of Parkhead, (died 1602), was a Scottish landowner, mining entrepreneur, Provost of Edinburgh, and Keeper of Edinburgh Castle.

== Career ==
George Douglas was a son of George Douglas of Pittendreich, the name of his mother is unknown. His half-sister, Elizabeth, daughter of Lady Dundas, married Smeton Richeson. He married Marioun Douglas, heiress of Parkhead or Parkheid, and so became known as George Douglas of Parkhead. Parkhead is close to the Lanarkshire town of Douglas. He was later Provost of Edinburgh.

=== Refortification of Edinburgh Castle ===
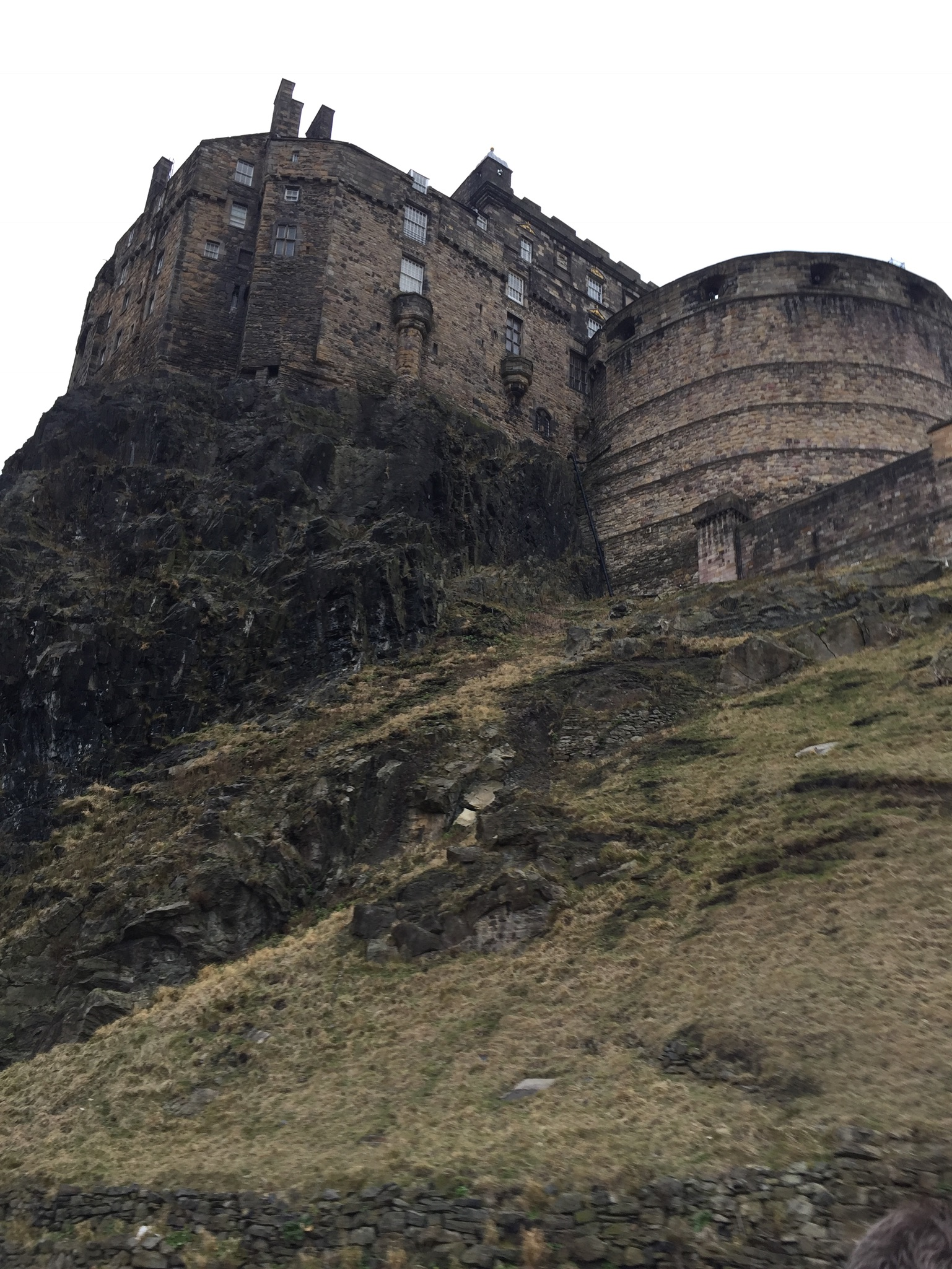
George Douglas supervised the building of the half-moon battery at Edinburgh Castle

After Edinburgh Castle was recovered from William Kirkcaldy of Grange in May 1573, George Douglas was appointed its Captain or keeper by his half-brother Regent Morton. George Douglas supervised the rebuilding of part of the back wall and other repairs, buying lime, sand, slate and glass. Part of the running expenses, or "sustenation" of the castle was paid to Douglas from the customs of Edinburgh town by Robert Gourlay. Parkhead is credited with building the half-moon battery at Edinburgh castle, the Historie of King James the Sext records that Regent Morton appointed him captain, and caused "masonis to begin to redd (clear away) the bruisit wallis, and to repaire the foirwark to the forme of ane bulwark, platt and braid above, for the resett and ryving (receiving) of many canonis." Some building accounts from this work survive.

=== Douglas and Regent Morton ===
Douglas prospered during the regency of his brother, James Douglas, 4th Earl of Morton, and his servant Florence Douglas was made Rothesay Herald. When his brother resigned the regency of Scotland in March 1579, George Douglas of Parkhead made an inventory of the personal jewellery of Mary, Queen of Scots kept in Edinburgh Castle, and of the textiles, the royal tapestries, Mary's remaining costume, her pictures, dolls, and library, and he itemised the artillery of the castle and the tools in its workshops. The taking of this inventory was described in the chronicle attributed to David Moysie.

When Morton resigned the Regency in 1578, Parkhead was replaced as provost of Edinburgh by Archibald Stewart. The Douglas family were being displaced by Lennox Stewarts.

Douglas was involved in lead mining at Wanlockhead and Glengonnar or Leadhills in Lanarkshire and in Orkney. In June 1581 his interest in the lead mines with all the lead ore recovered was confiscated and given to James Stewart, Earl of Arran because he had withheld Torthorwald Castle from the earl.

Parkhead wrote to Francis Walsingham in June 1582 to thank him for hospitality in England, mentioning his friend John Selby of the garrison of Berwick-upon-Tweed. He had written to Selby in May 1582 describing a rumour that James VI would be sent to France. Parkhead went to London again in September 1582.

In August 1584 George Douglas and his sons James and George were declared traitors and their goods and lands forfeited for their role "art and part" in the Raid of Stirling in April 1584. Archibald Douglas, who had been constable of Edinburgh Castle, was executed at Stirling.

== Norway ==
James VI of Scotland sailed to Norway to meet his bride Anna of Denmark in October 1589. George Douglas of Parkhead was one of his companions. He wrote from Oslo to the Earl of Morton on 30 November 1589. The king had decided to stay over winter at the Danish court, and the Earl's son Archibald Douglas had decided to go travelling. He had asked Parkhead to go with him.

== Later life ==
After their kinsman William Douglas, 6th Earl of Morton had been imprisoned in their keeping at Edinburgh Castle, Marion Douglas wrote to his wife Agnes Leslie, Countess of Morton to thank her for a gift of cheese from her farms at Fossoway near Lochleven Castle. She said that Morton had "received but very simple entertainment here".

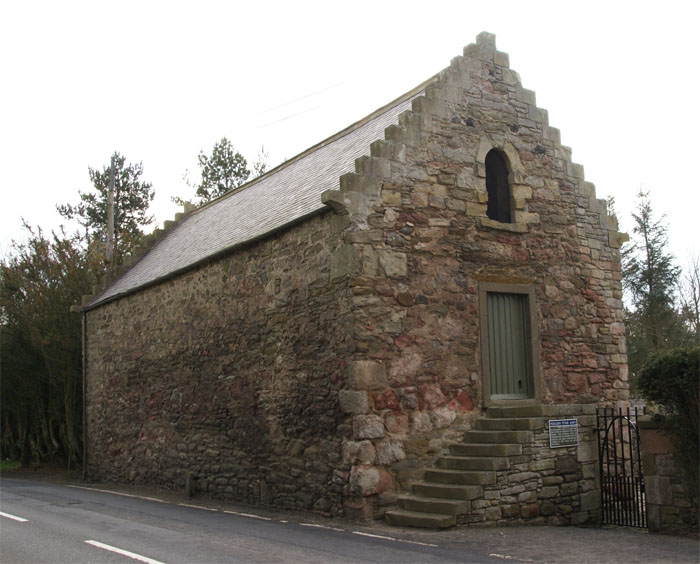
George Douglas of Parkhead stored oats at Foulden tithe barn

Another of Marion Douglas's letters concerns the lead mines. On 6 August 1592 she wrote from Parkhead to Lord Menmuir asking for his decision about the mining concessions between Eustachius Roche and her husband. She had been obliged to order her miners to suspend working, putting them to other work or laying them off. On 20 December 1593 George Douglas and his son James made over some of their lead mining rights in Glengonnar to the goldsmith and financier Thomas Foulis.

An English prospector Stephen Atkinson writing in 1619 stated that "George Parkhead" was killed by a landslide in wet weather at a mine working at "Short-clough brayes". It took three days to dig him out. The Shortcleuch water joins the Elvan and falls into the Clyde. Some sources suggest the victim of this accident was a son of George Douglas of Parkhead, and it occurred in 1586 while he was prospecting for gold.

George Douglas of Parkhead's will was registered in Edinburgh in 1602. It mentions oats stored in the barn yard of "Auld Foulden".

== Family ==
Arms of the House Douglas of Parkhead

The children of George Douglas and Marion Douglas included;

- James Douglas of Parkhead (d. 1608), who married Elizabeth Carlyle, daughter of William, Master of Carlyle. She was an heiress and the marriage was probably arranged by Regent Morton. It was said that he was cruel to her. On 2 November 1596 James Douglas of Parkhead and his accomplices killed his father's enemy, James Stewart, former Earl of Arran at Symington. They claimed that Stewart was technically a rebel, "at the horn". As his tombstone at Holyrood Abbey mentions, James Douglas was killed on the Royal Mile Edinburgh on 14 July 1608, by Captain William Stewart, son of William Stewart of Monkton and a nephew of Arran. Elizabeth Carlyle then married William Sinclair of Blaas.
  - The children of James Douglas and Elizabeth Carlyle included; James Douglas, who married (1) Elizabeth Gordon of Lochinvar, (2) Anne Saltonstall, daughter of Richard Saltonstall, Lord Mayor of London.
- George Douglas of Mordington, who married Margaret Dundas, daughter of Archibald Dundas of Fingask, and sister of William Dundas who wrote letters commenting on the court of Anne of Denmark in 1590 and painted ceilings in 1593. She was the widow of William Kerr of Ancram, and mother of the courtier Robert Kerr.
  - The children of George Douglas and Margaret Dundas included; George Douglas ambassador to Poland and Sweden for Charles I of England; and Margaret Douglas who married Sir James Lockhart of Lee, her children included William Lockhart who was ambassador to France for Oliver Cromwell; George Lockhart a lawyer; and Anne Lockhart who married George Lockhart of Tarbrax.
- John Douglas, minister of Crail.
- Catherine Douglas, who married Sir James Dundas of Arniston, governor of Berwick upon Tweed after 1603.
- Christian (or Margaret) Douglas, who married (1) Edward Sinclair of Roslin and Herbertshire, (2) Sir Patrick Home of Ayton.
- Martha Douglas, who married Robert Bruce, minister of Edinburgh in 1590. Their betrothal ring was kept by the Bruce family of Kinnaird, Stirlingshire.
- Mary Douglas, who married John Carruthers of Holmains in Annandale.
