= Wichebukta =

Bay in Svalbard, Norway

Geography of Wichebukta
- Coordinates: 78°28′44″N 18°57′40″E
- Terrain: Marine
- Natural hazards: Landslide

Wichebukta is a bay in Sabine Land at Spitsbergen, Svalbard, at the western shore of Storfjorden. It is named after English merchant and ship owner Richard Wiche.

To the west of the bay is the mountain of Wichefjellet and the mountain group of Hahnfjella.
