= Lord Carlyle of Torthorwald =

Historic title in Scotland

The Lordship of Parliament of Carlyle of Torthorwald (Lord Carlyle of Torthorwald) was created in the Peerage of Scotland around 1473 for Sir John Carlyle. In 1638, the sixth lord resigned the lordship to the Earl of Queensberry.

== Lords Carlyle of Torthorwald (c.1473–1638) ==
- John Carlyle, 1st Lord Carlyle (d. 1501)
- William Carlyle, 2nd Lord Carlyle (d. 1524)
- James Carlyle, 3rd Lord Carlyle (d. 1526)
- Michael Carlyle, 4th Lord Carlyle (d. 1575)
- Elizabeth Carlyle, 5th Lady Carlyle (d. c.1620), who married James Douglas, a son of George Douglas of Parkhead
- James Douglas, 6th Lord Carlyle, 2nd Earl of Queensberry (d. 1671) (surrendered 1638, succeeded as earl 1640)
