= Torthorwald Castle =

- Torthorwlad, Dumfries and Galloway, Scotland; UK grid reference NY033782
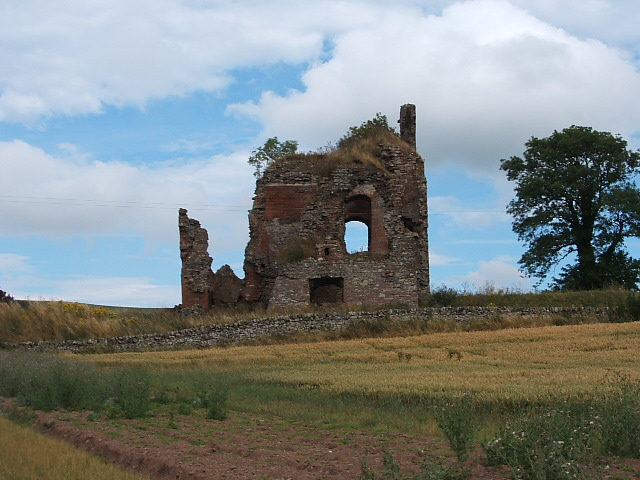
- The castle in 2005

Site information
- Type: Oblong plan Tower house
- Owner: Private
- Open to the public: Yes
- Condition: Ruined

Location
- Shown within Scotland
- Location within Scotland
- Coordinates: 55.089191°N 3.51447°W
- Height: 60 feet

Site history
- Built: The ruins comprise four phases of building, the earliest from the 14th Century
- Materials: Stone

Torthorwald Castle is a large ruined rectangular tower at the centre of the village of Torthorwald just outside Dumfries in south west Scotland.

== History ==
The first castle on the site was an earthwork motte-and-bailey built in the 12th century. The earliest building which forms part of the current ruins was built in the 14th century.

=== Clan Kirkpatrick ===
Torthorwald Castle was originally owned by Sir David Torthorwald in the 13th Century, some of his descendants supported the English army during the First War of Scottish Independence, because of it, King Robert the Bruce confiscated the lands in 1306 and granted them to Sir John de Soules (Guardian of Scotland), but he died in After John's death in Ireland in 1310, after it passed to the Scottish clan, when Humphrey de Kirkpatrick acquired the lands in 1326, and they started the stone structure of the castle that became the Torthowarld castle.

=== Carlyle family ===
In 1425 William Carlyle married the Kirkpatrick heiress and Torthorwald Castle passed to Carlyle family. In 1544 the castle was attacked by Michael Lord Carlyle and sacked, in his raid against his sister-in-law, Jonet Scrimgeour. She was reinstated by Regent Arran - James Hamilton, Earl of Arran - and the legal settlement includes a list of the contents of the Castle in the Scots language, and the farmstock in Latin. Michael Lord Carlyle retained the castle until the latter decades of the sixteenth century.

=== Douglas family ===
In 1609 the ownership of the castle passed from Michael Carlyle to his half brother Douglases of Parkhead since then became property of the Douglas family, the last resident of the castle was Archibald Douglas of Dornock, who lived there until 1630.

== Ruins and restoration ==
The roof of the castle was removed in the eighteenth century, after it the Torthorwald castle drifted into ruin, during the next century efforts were made to stabilise its structure. In 1993 the north end of the tower collapsed.

The basement and first floor hall of this tower are vaulted and in one corner is a turnpike stair that leads to the upper floors. It appears that the original entrance was on the first floor.

== See also ==
- Clan Douglas
- Clan Kirkpatrick
- Lord Carlyle of Torthorwald
