= St Nicholas of Myra, South Ockendon =

St Nicholas of Myra
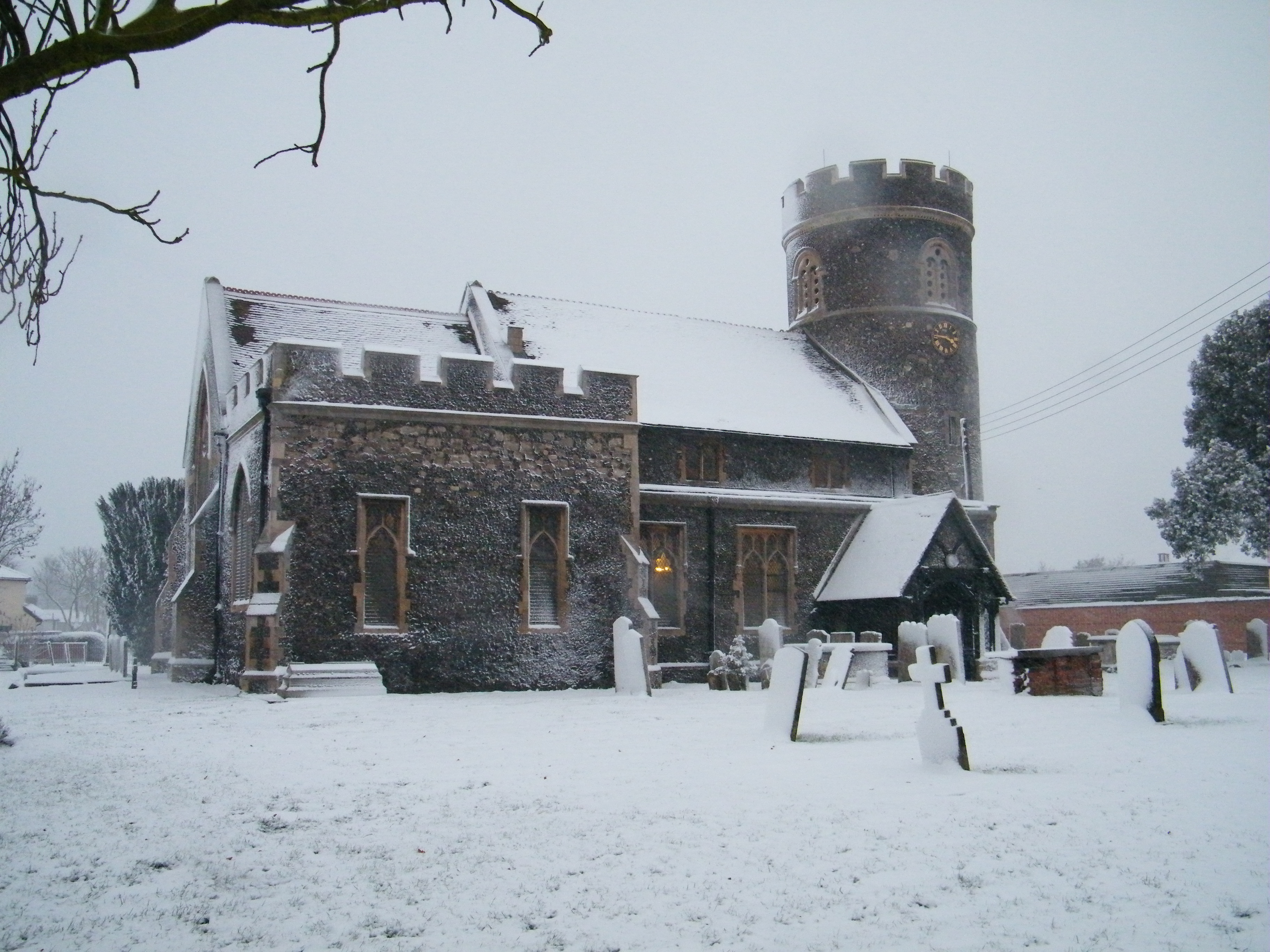
- St Nicholas of Myra church from the north-east, December 2010
- St Nicholas of Myra
- 51.5226°N 0.2977°E
- Location: The Green, South Ockendon, RM15 6SD
- Country: England
- Denomination: Church of England
- Website: St Nicholas South Ockendon

History
- Dedication: St Nicholas of Myra

Architecture
- Heritage designation: Grade I

Clergy
- Vicar: Rev'd Tara Frankland

St Nicholas of Myra is a Grade I listed parish church in South Ockendon, Essex, England, 20 miles east of London and 8 miles south-east of Romford. The building has been under the National Heritage List for England since 8 February 1960. It stands on the south side of the green in the middle of the village as it has done for 860 years.

== Dedication ==
The church is dedicated to St Nicholas, Bishop of Myra (now Demre in modern Turkey) in the 4th century; a signatory of the Nicene Creed; patron saint of Russia and Greece, and of children, merchants, pawnbrokers, sailors, scholars and travellers.

== Ministry ==
St Nicholas is part of the Mardyke Team Ministry.

== Construction ==
The walls are of flint and stone rubble; the dressings are of Reigate Stone. Although the two top storeys are 19th century, the four storied round tower was built onto the existing 12th century structure in the mid 13th century. Almost all of the church was rebuilt late in the 15th century when the north aisle and chantry chapel were added and a 12th-century doorway was reset in the north wall of the aisle. In 1744 the western part of the tower collapsed and was rebuilt. The chancel and north chapel, were extensively restored in 1866.

== The round tower ==
St Nicholas is one of only six Essex Round Tower Churches. In 1552 the tower contained four bells but they were destroyed by lightning which struck the church and demolished the tower's thatched spire in 1652/3. Richard Mulford, the Sexton donated a bell to replace the four bells, this bell was cast by John and Christopher Hodson of London in 1678. The present bell was installed in 1865, donated by Richard Armstrong of Westbourne Park Villas, London and cast by the famous Whitechapel Bell Foundry in London.

== The porch and north doorway ==
The 12th-century north doorway was moved out and reset in its present position in the 15th century, surrounded by a 19th-century porch. The Norman doorway has three orders and the middle columns have spiral fluting and shaft ring enrichments. The capitals are carved with volutes and foliage; the arches are also decorated lavishly with chevrons and billets.

== The Lady Chapel and Saltonstall Memorial ==
Interred in this chapel is Sir Richard Saltonstall (1521–1601), Lord of the Manor, patron of the church and Lord Mayor of London in 1597. There is a fine Elizabethan monument to Sir Richard erected by his wife Susannah, located on the north wall of the chapel. The monument is built of variegated marble. Between the columns are two arches forming alcoves for the principal figures of Sir Richard and his wife. Sir Richard can be seen wearing the insignia of the Lord Mayor of London. In the plinth are the figures of their sixteen children.
