= List of diplomats of the United Kingdom to the Hanseatic Cities =

Resident and Minister Plenipotentiary of the United Kingdom to the Hanseatic Cities
- Britischer Resident und bevollmächtigter Minister bei den Hansestädten
- Royal Coat of Arms of the United Kingdom
- Residence: English Court, Gröningerstraße, Altstadt, Hamburg
- Inaugural holder: Richard Clough
- Formation: 1567 (to Hamburg); 1611 (to Hanseatic Republics); 1813 (to Hanseatic Republics)
- Final holder: John Ward
- Abolished: 1578–1611 (Staple War); 1806–1813 (Napoleonic Wars); 1871 (German Unification)

The United Kingdom had a diplomatic representative to the three sovereign Hanseatic cities of Bremen, Hamburg and Lübeck until German unification in 1871. The envoy was usually only a resident, but sometimes he was also minister plenipotentiary to Lower Saxony. He was usually resident at Hamburg, which had long been an important port for British trade, and the staple port of the Company of Merchant Adventurers of London.

== Heads of Mission ==
=== Residents ===
- 1689–1700: Sir Paul Rycaut
- 1702–1713: John Wich Envoy Extraordinary from 1709
  - 1707–1709: Dr John Robinson (Envoy Extraordinary to Sweden) was resident in Hamburg
- 1713–1741: Cyril Wich or Wyche Chargé d'Affaires 1713–1714; Resident 1714–1719; Minister 1719–1725; Envoy Extraordinary 1712–1741; created a Baronet in 1729
- 1741–1756: James Cope
- 1757–1763: Philip Stanhope
- 1762–1763: Robert Colbrooke

=== Residents to the Hanse Towns and minister plenipotentiary to Lower Saxony ===
- 1763–1772: Ralph Woodford
- 1772–1790: Emmanuel Matthias
- 1790–1798: Charles Henry Fraser
- 1798–1803: Sir James Crauford, Bt, also to Denmark and Meckenburg
- 1803–1805: Sir George Rumbold, Bt
- 1805–1807: Edward Thornton
- 1807–1813: No diplomatic relations during the Continental System
  - 1813: Alexander Cockburn Special Mission
- 1815–1820: Alexander Cockburn Envoy Extraordinary
- 1820–1823: Joseph Charles Mellish Chargé d'Affaires
- 1823–1836: No diplomatic representation
- 1836–1841: Henry Canning Chargé d'Affaires
- 1841–60: Colonel George Lloyd Hodges Chargé d'Affaires
- 1860–70: John Ward Chargé d'Affaires and Consul-General

== See also ==
- History of Hamburg
- List of diplomatic missions in Hamburg
