= Franz Thönnes =

German politician

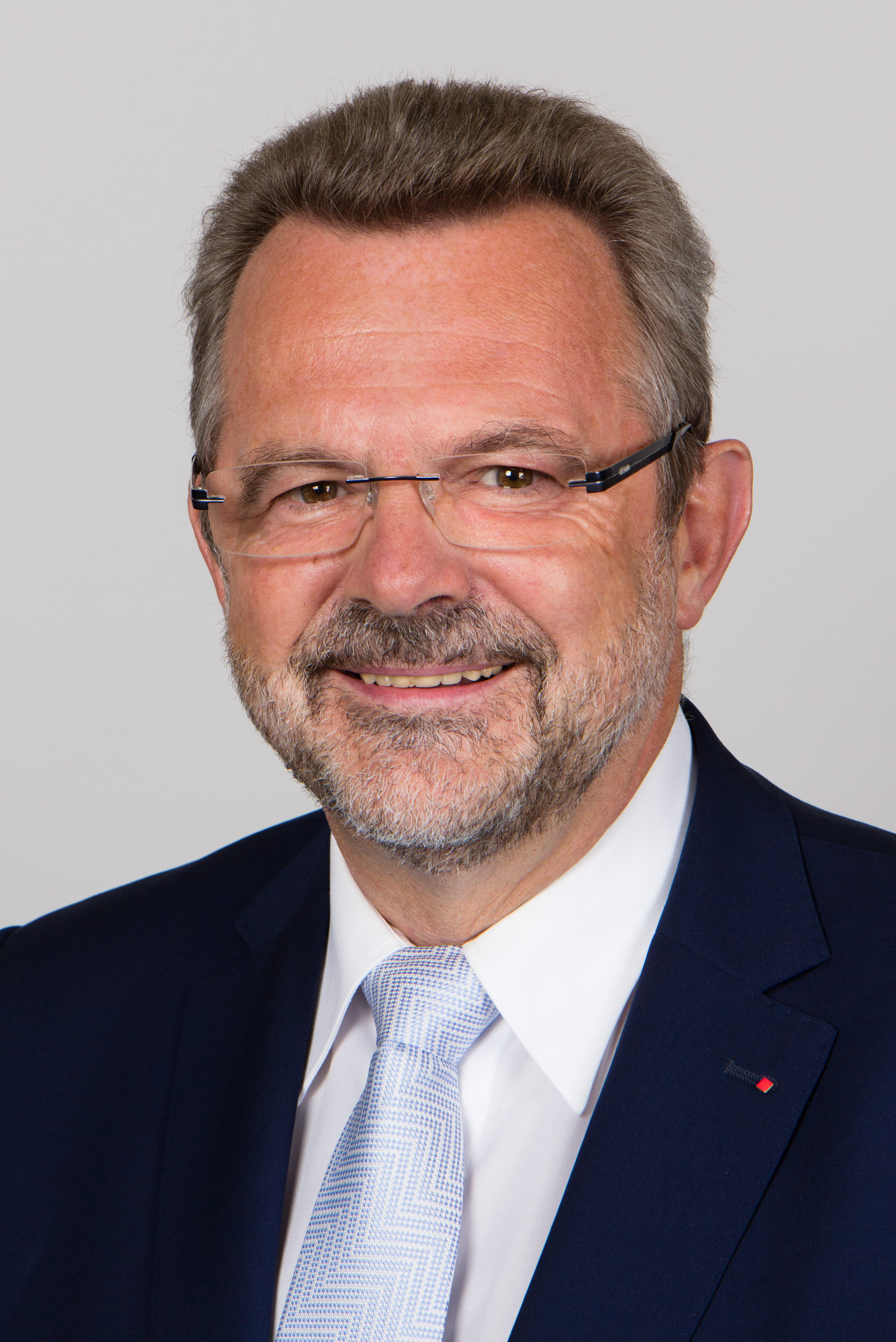
- Franz Thönnes in 2014

Member of the Bundestag
- In office 1994–2017

Personal details
- Born: 16 September 1954 (age 72) Essen, West Germany (now Germany)
- Party: SPD

Franz Thönnes (born 16 September 1954 in Essen) is a German politician (SPD) who was member of the Bundestag, the German parliament, from 1994 to 2017.

== Life ==
From 1994 to 2017 Thönnes was a member of the German Bundestag. From November 2000 to January 2001, he was socio-political spokesman and from February 2001 to October 2002, he was deputy chairman of the SPD parliamentary group. Since 2013 he has been the deputy foreign policy spokesman of his parliamentary group. From 2002 to 2005 he was Parliamentary State Secretary to the Federal Minister of Health and Social Security, then Parliamentary State Secretary to the Federal Minister of Labour and Social Affairs until November 2009.
