= Sven Wendorf =

German politician (born 1972)

Member of the Bundestag
- Incumbent
- Assumed office 25 March 2025

Personal details
- Born: 14 February 1972 (age 54) Lübeck
- Party: Alternative for Germany (since 2017)

Sven Wendorf (born 14 February 1972 in Lübeck) is a German politician who was elected member of the Bundestag in 2025. He has been a member of the district council of Segeberg since 2018.
