= James Cope (UK politician) =

British Member of Parliament and political envoy

James Cope (c.1709 – 1756) was a British Member of Parliament and political envoy.

He was the son of Gen. Sir John Cope by Jane, the daughter of Anthony Duncombe.

He worked as secretary to Walter Titley at the Danish court in Copenhagen from 1729 to 1737 and then as secretary to the commissioners in Antwerp negotiating a commercial treaty from 1737 to 1741. He was the resident envoy in Hamburg to the Hanse towns from 1741 to 1756.

He was given a seat in Parliament by his uncle Anthony Duncombe, 1st Baron Feversham, representing Downton from 1754 to his death in 1756.

He never married.

== See also ==
- List of diplomats of the United Kingdom to the Hanseatic Cities

Parliament of Great Britain
| Preceded by James Hayes; Thomas Duncombe | MP for Downton; 1754–1756 with James Hayes | Succeeded by James Hayes; Edward Poore |
