= Hahnfjella =

Mountain group in Svalbard, Norway

Coordinates: 78.414°N 18.975°E

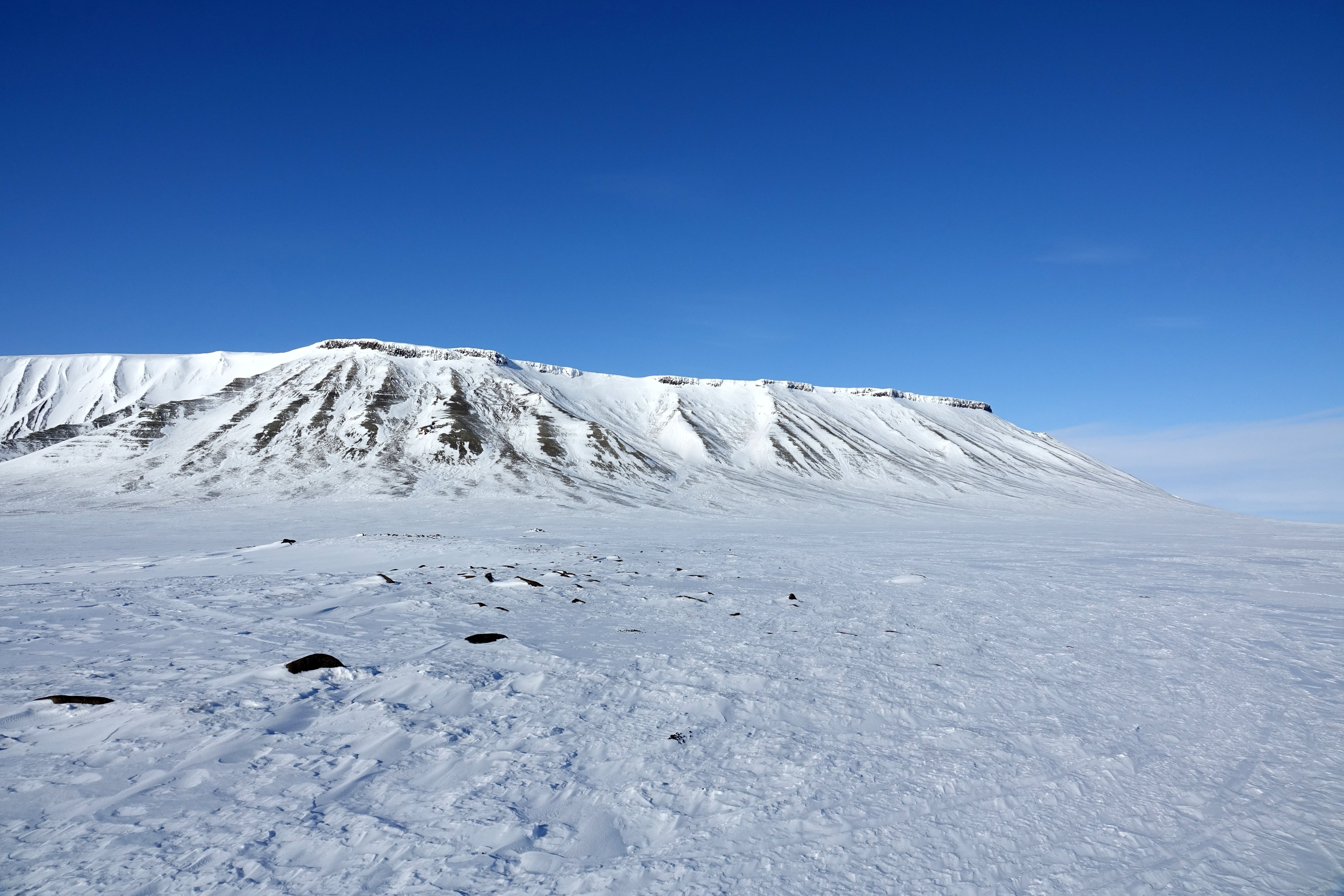
Hahnfjella on Svalbard's east coast.

Hahnfjella is a mountain group in Sabine Land at Spitsbergen, Svalbard, west of the bay of Wichebukta. It is named after the German geographer Friedrich Gustav Hahn. The highest mountain of the group reaches 537 metres above sea level.
