= Tangstedt =

- Municipality
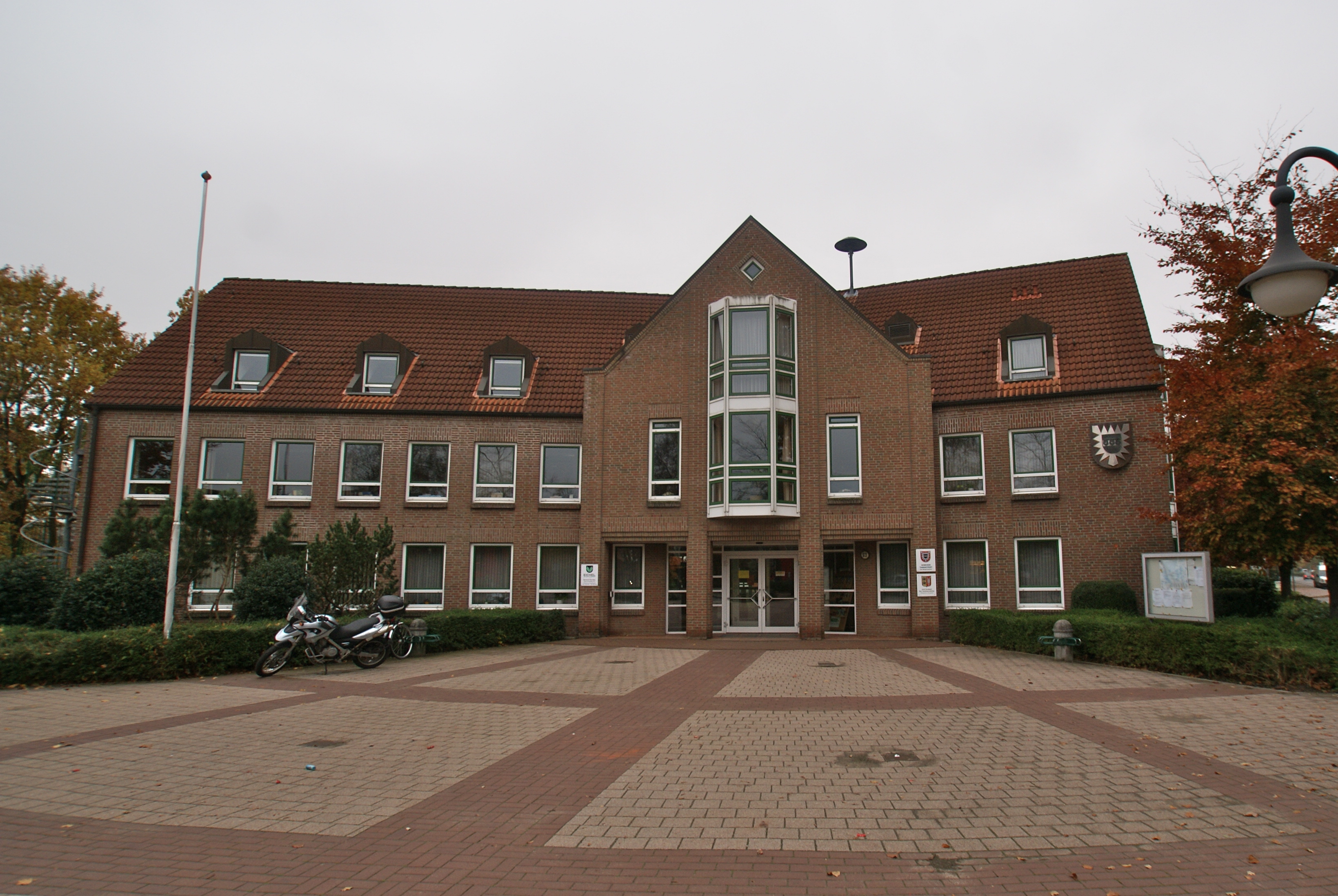
- Town hall

- Coat of arms

- Location of Tangstedt within Stormarn district
- Interactive map of Tangstedt
- Location within Germany Location within Schleswig-Holstein
- Coordinates: 53°44′N 10°5′E
- Country: Germany
- State: Schleswig-Holstein
- District: Stormarn
- Municipal assoc.: Itzstedt

Government
  - Mayor: Jürgen Lamp (CDU)

Area
  - Total: 39.86 km^{2} (15.39 sq mi)
- Elevation: 24 m (79 ft)

Population (2025-12-31)
  - Total: 6,456
  - Density: 162.0/km^{2} (419.5/sq mi)
- Time zone: UTC+01:00 (CET)
  - Summer (DST): UTC+02:00 (CEST)
- Postal codes: 22889
- Dialling codes: 04109
- Vehicle registration: OD
- Website: www.tangstedt-stormarn.de

Tangstedt (German pronunciation: [ˈtaŋʃtɛt]; Low German: Tangsteed) is a municipality in the district of Stormarn, in Schleswig-Holstein, Germany. It is situated approximately 12 km (7.5 mi) northwest of Ahrensburg, and 22 km (14 mi) northeast of Hamburg.
