= Richard Saltonstall (mayor) =

English merchant and politician

Sir Richard Saltonstall
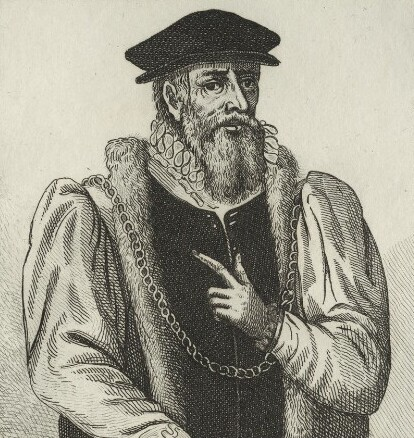

Lord Mayor of London
- In office 1597–1598
- Preceded by: Henry Billingsley
- Succeeded by: Stephen Soame

Sheriff of the City of London
- In office 1589–1590 Serving with Hugh Ofley
- Preceded by: Thomas Skinner; John Ketcher
- Succeeded by: Stephen Soame; Richard Gurney

Member of Parliament for London
- In office 1586–1588 Serving with Sir Edward Osborne, William Fleetwood, Thomas Aldersey
- Preceded by: Sir Nicholas Woodroffe; William Fleetwood; Thomas Aldersey; Henry Billingsley
- Succeeded by: Sir George Barne; William Fleetwood; Thomas Aldersey; Andrew Palmer

Personal details
- Born: 1521; Yorkshire, England
- Died: 17 March 1601 (aged 79–80); South Ockendon, Essex
- Spouse: Suzanna Poyntz
- Relations: Peter Wyche (grandson); Nathaniel Wyche (grandson); Thomas Myddelton
- Children: 16

Sir Richard Saltonstall (c. 1521 – 17 March 1601) was an English merchant and politician who served as the Lord Mayor of London in 1599.

== Early life ==
Saltonstall was born in Yorkshire, England in 1521. He was the second son of Agnes and Gilbert Saltonstall, a cloth merchant of Halifax, Yorkshire who owned lands in Hipperholme.

He was descended from Robert de Saltonstall who held lands in Warley, near Halifax, in 1274. Saltonstall was the uncle of New England colonist Sir Richard Saltonstall.

== Career ==
For a time, Saltonstall lived in the Netherlands, where he was a member of the Company of Merchant Adventurers of London; by 1585, he had become the director of the company. He was also affiliated with the Muscovy Company, the Levant Company, and the English East India Company.

He also had a long political career serving the city of London. He was a member of the city council by 1583, a Member of Parliament in 1586, and an alderman by 1588. He served as Sheriff of the City of London for 1589 and was elected Lord Mayor of London for 1597. He served as master of the Skinners Company in 1589, 1593, from 1595 to 1596, and from 1599 to 1600. He was knighted in 1598.

== Personal life ==
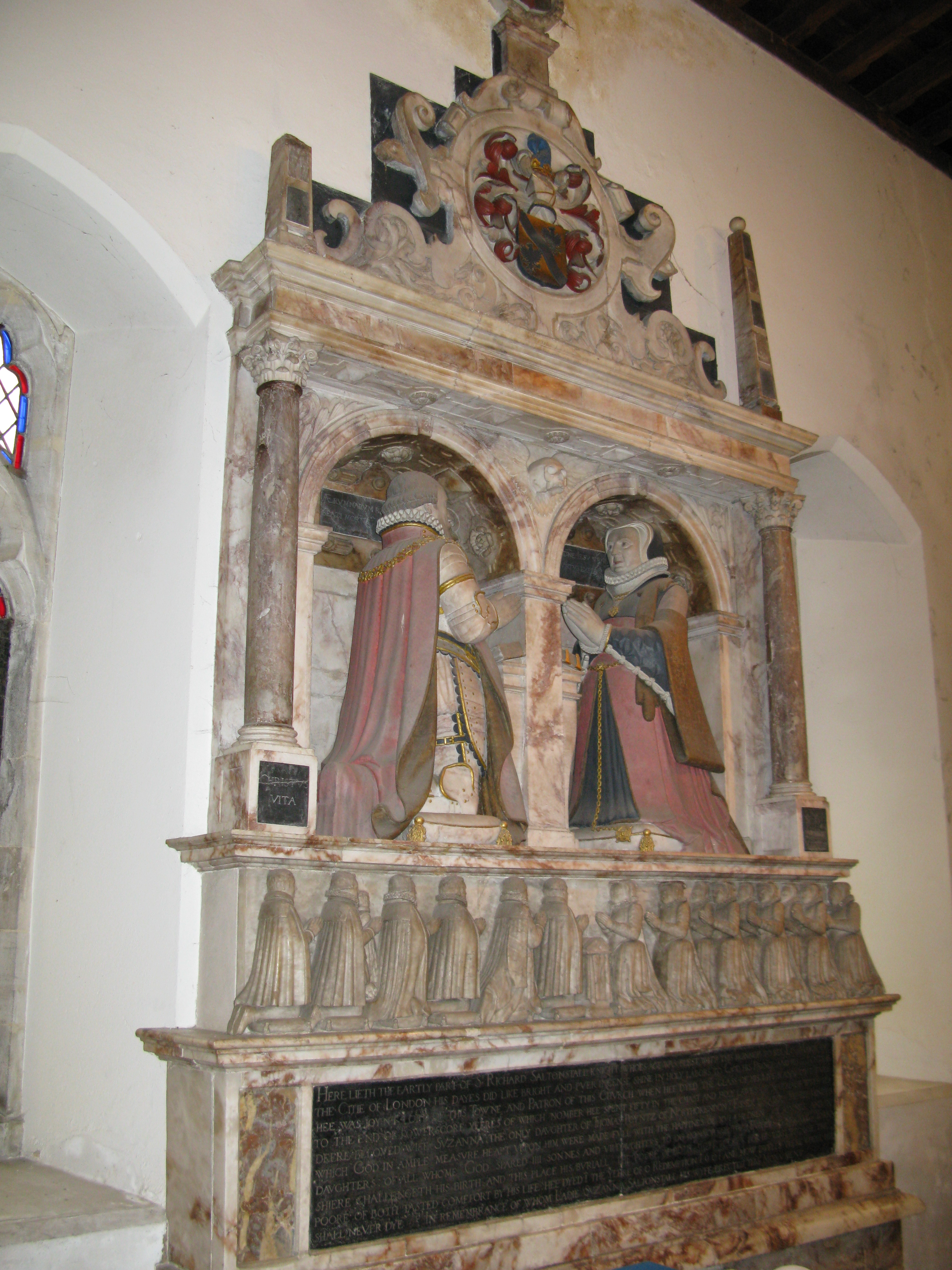
Saltonstall Memorial

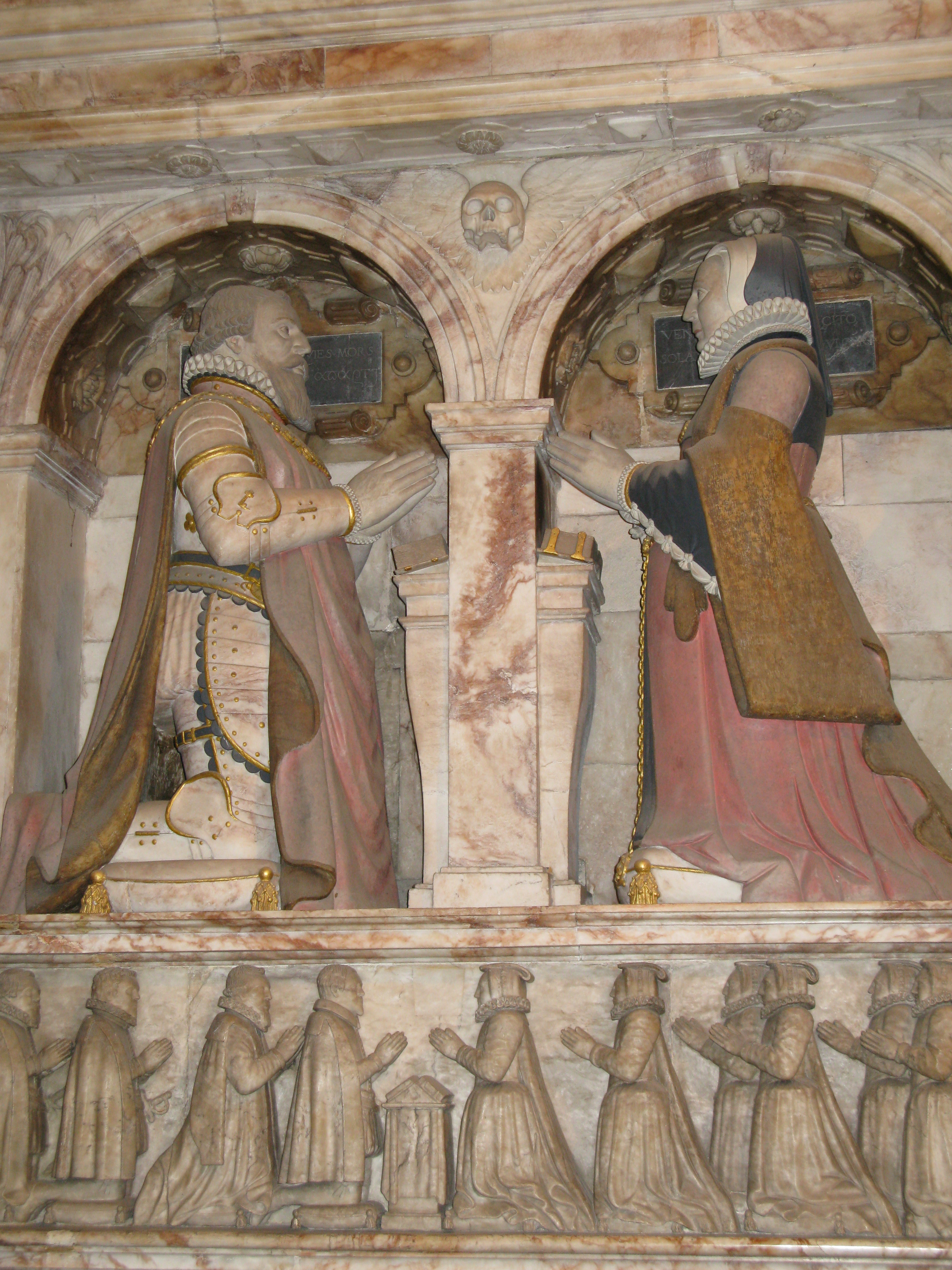
Sir Richard and Susannah Saltonstall, St Nicholas, South Ockendon

He married Suzanna Poyntz, only daughter of Thomas Poyntz of South Ockendon; together they had seven sons and nine daughters (in addition to at least one illegitimate daughter fathered by Richard), including:

- Eleanor Saltonstall (1554–c. 1601), who married Vincent Harvie. After his death she married Robert Myddelton, MP for Weymouth and Melcombe Regis.
- Hester Saltonstall (1555–1587), who married Sir Thomas Myddelton (a later Lord Mayor of London),
- Elizabeth Saltonstall (1556–1626), who married Richard Wyche (a director of the English East India Company).
- Judith Saltonstall (1580–1611), who married Arthur Forest and after his death, Edward Riche of Herenden.
- Susan Saltonstall, who married Richard Sunderland of Colay near Halifax.
- Gilbert Saltonstall, who married Anne Harleston of Groves; he died in 1583, predeceasing his father.
- Edward Saltonstall, who died in 1563, predeceasing his father.
- Richard Saltonstall, who married Jane Barnard, daughter of Francis Barnard of Northamptonshire.
- Samuel Saltonstall, who was knighted in 1640.
- Peter Saltonstall (1577–1651), who became an equerry at the court of James VI and I, and married Christian Pettus, a daughter of Sir John Pettus. After his wife's death in 1646, he married Anne Waller, daughter of Edward Waller.
- Martha Saltonstall (1594–1680), who married Dr. John Clark of Boston.
- Anne Saltonstall, who married John Harby of London.

Sir Richard's estates were at "Mynchenlane", London, Moorhall in Hertfordshire, and South Ockendon near Romford in Essex. Upon his death on 17 March 1601 at his estate in South Ockendon, his heir was his eldest surviving son Richard Salstonstall. His widow died in February 1612 and was buried alongside him at South Ockendon.

=== Legacy and memorial ===
He is interred at St Nicholas of Myra, South Ockendon. There is a fine Elizabethan monument to Sir Richard by his wife Suzanna, located on the north wall of the chapel. The monument is built of variegated marble. Between the columns are two arches forming alcoves for the principal figures of Sir Richard and his wife. Sir Richard can be seen wearing the insignia of the Lord Mayor of London. In the plinth are the figures of their sixteen children.

Saltonstall's wife Suzanna was an aunt of the translator Adrian Poyntz, who dedicated his New and singular patternes & workes of linnen (London, 1591) and Treasure of the Soule (London, 1596) to her and Richard Saltonstall.

Through his daughter Elizabeth, he was grandfather of Sir Peter Wyche (the King's Ambassador to the Ottoman Empire) and Nathaniel Wyche (president of the English East India Company). Through his daughter Hester, he was grandfather of Gen. Sir Thomas Myddelton (a general in the English Civil War).

== See also ==
- Saltonstall family – a Boston Brahmin family descended from Richard Saltonstall through his nephew

Parliament of England
Preceded by Sir Nicholas Woodroffe; William Fleetwood; Thomas Aldersey; Henry Billingsley	Member of Parliament for London; 1586–1588; With: Sir Edward Osborne; William Fleetwood; Thomas Aldersey	Succeeded by Sir George Barne; William Fleetwood; Thomas Aldersey; Andrew Palmer
Civic offices
Preceded by Thomas Skinner; John Ketcher	Sheriffs of the City of London; 1589–1590; With: Hugh Ofley	Succeeded by Stephen Soame; Richard Gurney
Preceded by Henry Billingsley	Lord Mayor of the City of London; 1597–1598	Succeeded by Stephen Soame
