= Richard Wyche (merchant) =

Richard Wyche (pronounced Whyche) (1554–1621) was a London shipowner, explorer, and merchant.

== Origins ==
Richard Wyche was born in 1554 in Davenham, Cheshire. He was the son of Richard Wyche (1525–1594) and Margaret Haughton. He was descended from a Lord Mayor of London in the fifteenth century, Henry Wyche.

== Career as an adventurer ==
He was on the first Committee of Directors of the English East India Company, assisted in the formation of the North West Company in 1612, and was among the adventurers of the Muscovy Company.

Wiche Islands or Wiche's Land (discovered and named in 1617, and now erroneously called Kong Karls Land), Wichebukta (on the east coast of Spitsbergen), Wichefjellet (also on the Spitsbergen's east coast), and Wiche Sound (named and discovered in 1614 and now called Liefdefjorden and Woodfjorden) were all named after him.

== Marriage and family ==
Richard Wyche, Gentleman and Mercer, married Elizabeth Saltonstall on 18 February 1583/4 at St Dunstan in the East, London She was the daughter of Sir Richard Saltonstall, Member of Parliament and Lord Mayor of London. Elizabeth's first cousin was another Sir Richard Saltonstall, who in 1630 established a settlement in the Massachusetts Bay Colony.

This couple had many children. Nathaniel Wyche lived in India and was President of the East India Company in the late 1650s. Another son was Sir Peter Wyche, Ambassador to Constantinople (Ottoman Empire), who married Jane Meredith. Their children included (the second) Sir Peter Wyche, Sir Cyril Wyche, and Lady Jane Wyche, who married John Granville, 1st Earl of Bath. Sir Peter Wyche was one of the Chancellors of Oxford University, and his sons Sir Cyril and Sir Peter were among the founding members of the British Royal Society. His daughter Jane Wyche Granville was Countess of Bath and Lady of the Bedchamber to Henrietta Maria of France, Queen Consort of King Charles I of England.

Richard died on 20 November 1621 and was buried on 26 November at St Dunstan-in-the-East, London.
