= Peter Wyche (diplomat) =

English diplomat and translator

Sir Peter Wyche (1628 – c. 1699) was an English diplomat and translator.

He was one of the sons of Sir Peter Wyche and brother of Sir Cyril Wyche. He was educated at Exeter College, Oxford (matriculated 1643), Queens' College, Cambridge (BA 1645) and Trinity Hall, Cambridge (MA 1648) and was admitted to the Inner Temple in 1649. He was knighted in 1660. In May 1663 he was elected a Fellow of the Royal Society.

He was English Ambassador to Russia in 1669 and then immediately after to Poland in 1669–1670.

He died in London circa 1699. He had married Isabella, daughter of Sir Robert Bolles, Bart, of Scampton, Lincolnshire. His grandson Cyril Wyche also became Envoy Extraordinary and Minister Plenipotentiary to Russia and was created a baronet in 1729 (see Wyche baronets).

== Life ==
Wyche was admitted a gentleman commoner at Exeter College, Oxford, on 29 April 1643, matriculating, 'aged 15,' on 6 May following. He migrated in October 1644 to Trinity Hall, Cambridge, and graduated B.A. in 1645 and M.A. in 1648. Next year he was admitted a student of the Middle Temple, and shortly afterwards went abroad.

In May 1656 he was in Italy, where Hyde procured him a passport and a testimonial in Latin, signed by the exiled Charles II. He was knighted by Charles II at The Hague in May 1660, and shortly afterwards returned to England and was incorporated M.A. at Oxford. He was declared one of the fellows of the Royal Society upon its foundation by charter in 1662, and in 1665 was nominated chairman of a committee of the society appointed to consider the improvement of the English tongue, in which capacity he received a long letter from John Evelyn.

In 1669 he was sent as envoy extraordinary to Russia, sending despatches home from Moscow in September. Upon his journeys he was 'honourably' entertained at Danzig, at Königsberg, and at Hamburg, in which city he was English resident to the Hanseatic cities for several years, his commission terminating in February 1682. Among the state papers are several of his letters to Sir Joseph Williamson, who was godfather to his eldest son (several autograph letters of his to Williamson, Arlington, Ellis, and others, are in Addit. MS. 28896, passim).

== Personal ==
Wyche was the eldest son of Peter Wyche, and born in London in 1628. He is believed to have died about 1699, married on 19 February 1666 Isabella, daughter of Sir Robert Bolles (Blomefield, Hist. of Norfolk, ii. 180), bart., of Scampton, Lincolnshire, by Mary, daughter of Sir Edward Hussey, and had issue, first, John, English envoy extraordinary at Hamburg (Boyer, Annals of Queen Anne, 1710, viii. 386); second, Bernard, a merchant at Surat, and father of Peter Wyche, who was in 1741 high sheriff of Lincolnshire; third, Peter, a merchant, who died at Cambrai; fourth, George, a merchant at Pondicherry.

== Works ==
Wyche executed two capable translations from the Portuguese:

1. ‘The Life of Dom John de Castro, the fourth Viceroy of India. Written in Portuguese by Jacinto Freire de Andrada’ (London, fol.) This was dedicated to Queen Catherine, the consort of Charles II, prefaced by a brief sketch of Portuguese history by Wyche, and licensed for the press by Henry Bennett on 12 August 1663. A second edition, also in folio, appeared in 1693.
2. ‘A Short Relation of the River Nile, of its Source and Current, and of its overflowing the Campagnia of Egypt’ (London, 1669, 8vo). This was translated from a Portuguese manuscript at the request of a number of fellows of the Royal Society. Sir Peter further extended his reputation as a geographical scholar by his ‘The World geographically describ'd in fifty-two Copper Plates’ (London, 1687). The plates could either be bound or made up in packets on cards for purposes of instruction.
