= Peter Wyche (ambassador) =

English ambassador and merchant

The Right Honourable Sir Peter Wyche

Comptroller of the King's Household
- In office 1641–1643
- Preceded by: Sir Thomas Jermyn
- Succeeded by: Christopher Hatton, 1st Baron Hatton

British Ambassador to the Ottoman Empire
- In office 1627–1641
- Preceded by: Sir Thomas Roe
- Succeeded by: Sir Sackville Crowe

Personal details
- Born: c. 1593
- Died: 7 October 1643 (aged 49–50) Oxford, Oxfordshire, England
- Spouse: Jane Meredith (m. 1627)
- Relations: Richard Saltonstall (grandfather); Nathaniel Wyche (brother)
- Parent(s): Richard Wyche; Elizabeth Saltonstall

Sir Peter Wyche PC (c. 1593 – 7 October 1643) was a London merchant and English Ambassador to the Ottoman Empire from 1627 to 1641.

== Early life ==
Wyche was the sixth son of Richard Wyche (1554–1621), a merchant, and his wife Elizabeth (née Saltonstall) Wyche (1556–1626), daughter of Richard Saltonstall, Lord Mayor of London. His brother, Nathaniel Wyche, was a merchant and president of the East India Company.

His paternal grandparents were Margaret (née Haughton) Wyche and Richard Wyche, a descendant of the fifteenth-century Lord Mayor of London, Henry Wyche.

== Career ==
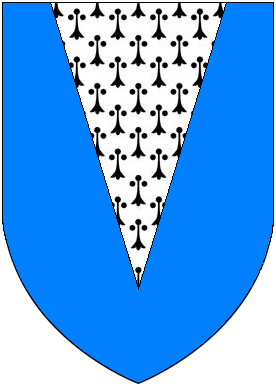
Arms of Wyche: Azure, a pile ermine

He was knighted by King Charles I on 16 December 1626, having received instructions from the king on 18 November, after his personal nomination. As ambassador, Wyche arrived at Constantinople on 10 April 1628, and remained at that post until he returned to England in May 1639. He secured a reduction of duty on English cloth. While in Constantinople he gave lodgings to the scholars and travellers John Greaves and Edward Pococke. From December 1637 to August 1640, Pococke resided at the British embassy, where he acted as temporary chaplain to Wyche.

His wife astonished the Sultana by making a visit to the Sultan's harem. It was said that the Sultana was amazed by the farthingales worn by the English ladies, and wondered if all English women had such an unusual shape.

In 1641 he became Privy Counsellor and Comptroller of the King's Household. He was a signer of the King's Declaration of Abhorrence at the idea of making war upon his Parliament. His descendant, Cyril Wyche, reported that Wyche lent Charles I £30,000.

He did not live to see the outcome of the English Civil War, dying at Oxford in late 1643.

== Personal life ==
On 17 April 1627, Sir Peter married Jane Meredith (d. 1660) daughter of Sir William Meredith, in Hanworth Church, Middlesex, England. Together, they were the parents of the following children:

- Sir Peter Wyche (1628 – c. 1699), the English ambassador to Russia and Poland; he married Isabella Bolles, daughter of Sir Robert Bolles, Bt.
- Jane Wyche (1630–1692), who married John Granville, 1st Earl of Bath.
- Sir Cyril Wyche (c. 1632 – 1707), who was born in Constantinople and became an MP and President of the Royal Society.
- Tuscarene Wyche (d. c. 1656), who died in Aleppo, Syria.
- William Wyche (d. c. 1660), who died unmarried in England.
- Shellet Wyche, who died young.
- Sophia Wyche, who died young.

Wyche died at Oxford on 7 October 1643 where he was buried on 7 December 1643, in Christ Church Cathedral in the south aisle, where a monument was erected to his memory. His son Tuscarene died in Aleppo, Syria and Peter's widow was granted administration of his estate in November 1656.

=== Descendants ===
Through his son Peter, he was a great-grandfather of Sir Cyril Wyche, 1st Baronet, also the Envoy Extraordinary and Minister Plenipotentiary to Russia who was created a baronet in 1729.

Through his daughter Jane, Countess of Bath, he was a grandfather of Charles Granville, 2nd Earl of Bath; Lady Jane Granville (wife of Sir William Leveson-Gower, 4th Baronet); Lady Catherine Granville (wife of Craven Peyton, MP for Boroughbridge); Lady Grace Granville, suo jure 1st Countess Granville (wife of George Carteret, 1st Baron Carteret); and John Granville, 1st Baron Granville of Potheridge.

== See also ==
- List of diplomats of the United Kingdom to the Ottoman Empire

Diplomatic posts
| Preceded by Sir Thomas Roe | British ambassador to the Ottoman Empire; 1627–1641 | Succeeded by Sir Sackville Crowe |
