= George Granville, 1st Baron Lansdowne =

17th/18th-century English poet, playwright, and politician

The Right Honourable The Lord Lansdowne PC
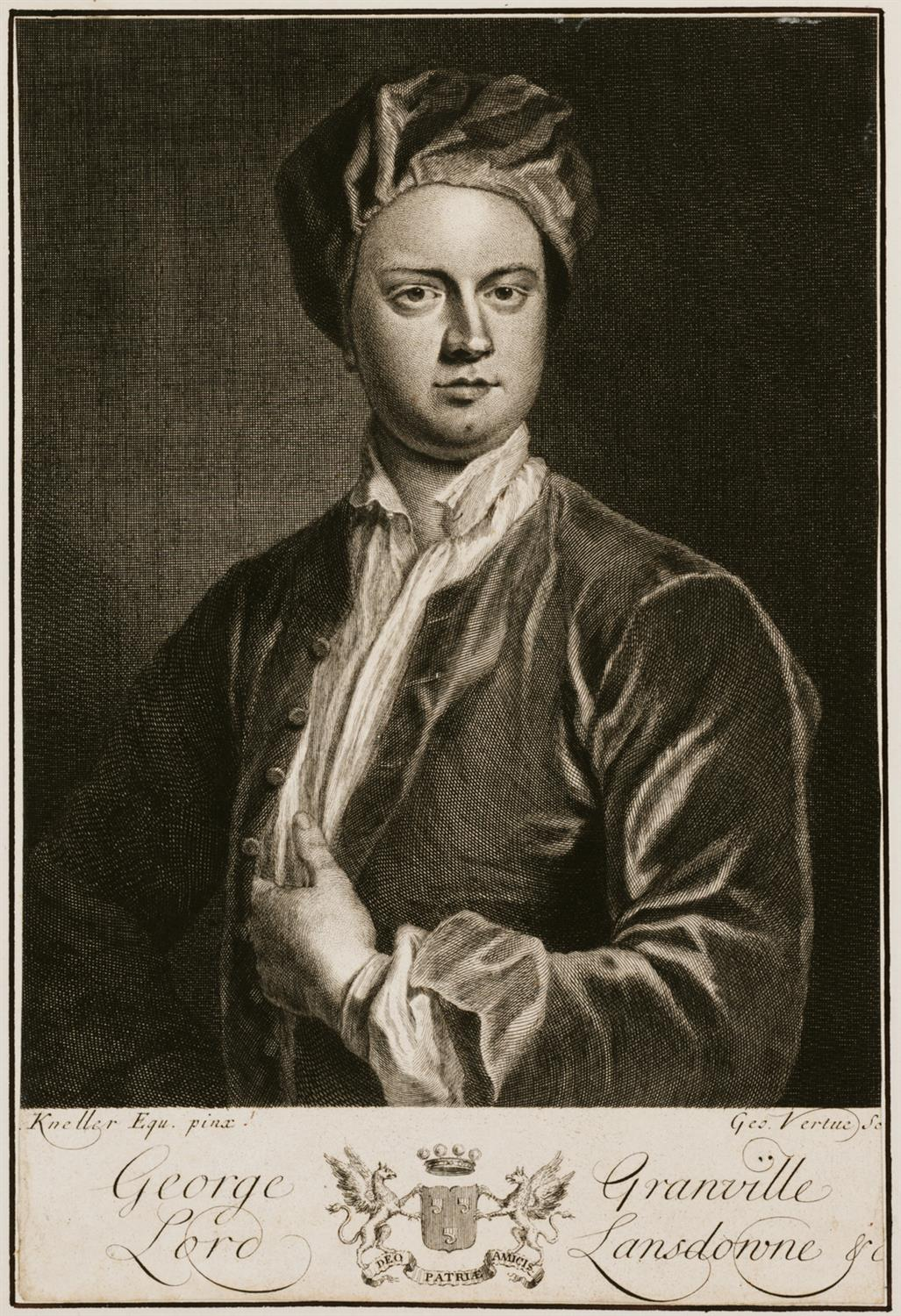
- George Granville, 1st Baron Lansdowne

Secretary at War
- In office 1710–1712
- Preceded by: Robert Walpole
- Succeeded by: Sir William Wyndham

Personal details
- Born: Birdcage Walk, London; 9 March 1666
- Died: 29 January 1735 (aged 68) Hanover Square, London
- Spouse: Mary Villiers (m. 1711–1735)
- Parents: Bernard Granville; Anne Morley
- Education: Trinity College, Cambridge

George Granville, 1st Baron Lansdowne PC (9 March 1666 – 29 January 1735), of Stowe, Cornwall, was an English Tory politician who sat in the English and British House of Commons from 1702 until 1712, when he was raised to the peerage as Baron Lansdown and sat in the House of Lords. He was Secretary at War during the Harley ministry from 1710 to 1712, but became a prominent Jacobite after 1714. He was also a noted poet and made a name for himself with verses composed on the visit of Mary of Modena, then Duchess of York, while he was at Cambridge in 1677. He was also a playwright, following in the style of John Dryden.

== Origins ==
Granville was the son of Bernard Granville, the fourth son of Sir Bevil Grenville (1596–1643) of Bideford in Devon and Stowe in the parish of Kilkhampton in Cornwall, a heroic Royalist commander in the Civil War. (The family changed the spelling of its name in 1661 from "Grenville" to "Granville", following the grant of the titles Baron Granville and Earl of Bath). His uncle was John Granville, 1st Earl of Bath (1628–1701) whose half-first-cousin was George Monck, 1st Duke of Albemarle, who both played leading roles in the restoration of the monarchy to King Charles II in 1660. He was heir male of William Granville, 3rd Earl of Bath (1692–1711), the 19-year-old son of his first cousin Charles Granville, 2nd Earl of Bath (1661–1701), lord of the manors of Bideford in Devon and of Stowe, Kilkhampton, Cornwall. These connections guaranteed that Granville began life as a staunch Tory, which would develop into an adherence to Jacobitism later in his life.

== Career ==
Granville was sent to France at the age of ten with his tutor, William Ellis, who was a proponent of passive resistance and later a servant of James II at Saint-Germain. He entered Trinity College, Cambridge in 1677. Among his productions while there were poems welcoming Mary of Modena when she visited the university. In 1682, he went to Paris with his brother Sir Bevill Granville, where they studied fencing, riding, dancing, mathematics and military science. He stayed in France until 1687, accumulating a £500 debt. He then lived in England at his mother's house at Marr, near Doncaster. His early interests were literary and by the mid-1690s he had befriended John Dryden and begun to write plays. He wrote an undistinguished comedy of manners entitled The She-Gallants, which was staged unsuccessfully in 1695. His adult plays bear the marks of Dryden's influence. The Heroick Love is taken from the first book of Homer's Iliad. Granville also followed Dryden in adapting Shakespeare and Granville's The Jew of Venice (1701) was a successful updating of The Merchant of Venice. Perhaps his greatest success was The British Enchanters (1705), a pseudo-operatic extravaganza staged by Thomas Betterton's company.

In the opinion of Samuel Johnson, Granville's non-dramatic poetry is slavishly imitative of Edmund Waller. However some of his poetry was popular in its day. Perhaps Granville's most useful act as regards poetry was the encouragement he gave to Alexander Pope, which Pope remembered with gratitude in his Epistle to Dr. Arbuthnot.

== Political life ==
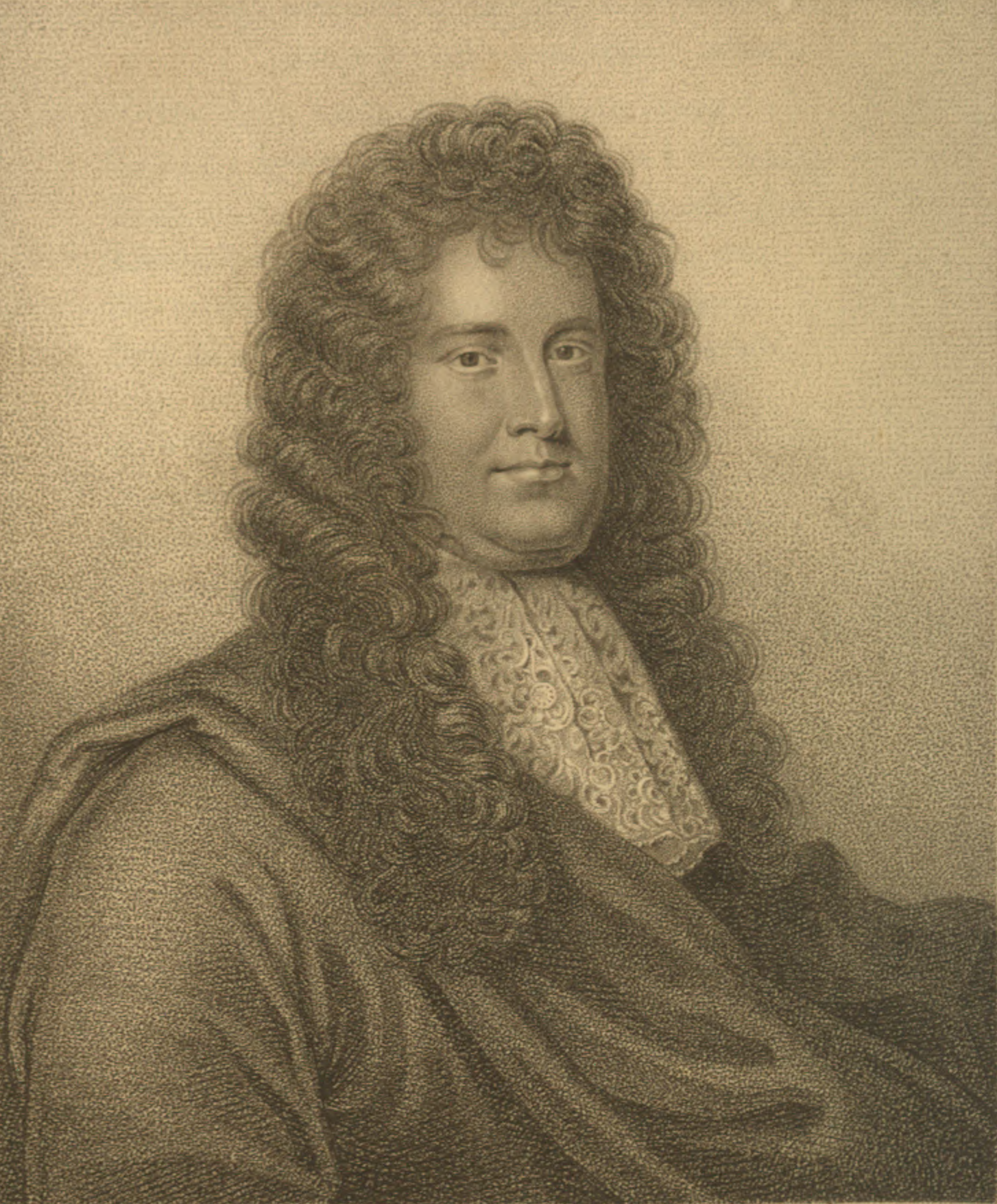
Granville as depicted in Walpole's A Catalogue of the Royal and Noble Authors, 1806.

The death of Granville's parents and of his uncle the 1st Earl of Bath in 1701 placed Granville in a position of power which the accession of Queen Anne in 1702 allowed him to employ. With the help of his cousin, John Granville, an influential Tory leader, he was elected Member of Parliament for Fowey at the 1702 English general election. When his elder brother, Sir Bevill Granville, was appointed Governor of Barbados, Granville inherited his office as constable of Pendennis Castle in 1703. In Parliament, he operated in the sphere of Harley, who was an indifferent patron at first. He was absent from the division on the Tack, becoming labelled a ‘Sneaker’. He was returned unopposed for Fowey at the 1705 English general election and with the help of Harley fended off an attempt to remove him from his post at Pendennis Castle. His aspiration to obtain a post led him to support the Court in voting for the Court candidate as Speaker on 25 October 1705, and he again supported the Court on the ‘place clause’ of the regency bill in February 1706. At the 1708 general election, he was returned again for Fowey. The height of his fame during the Godolphin-Marlborough administration came from his spirited defence of Henry Sacheverell in 1710.

After the fall of the Godolphin government, Granville became MP for Cornwall at the 1710 British general election, and on 28 September 1710 he was made Secretary at War. In this capacity, he oversaw the passage of important bills on munitions and recruitment. However, his experience in the Tory government was marked by family and legal strife. He was the heir male to the senior line of the Granville family following the death without progeny in 1711 of his cousin William Granville, 3rd Earl of Bath. He was not in succession to the earldom and was in recognition raised to the peerage on 1 January 1712 as Baron Lansdown of Bideford in the Peerage of Great Britain and vacated his seat in the House of Commons. He was one of Harley's Dozen created at once to change the political balance in the Whig-dominated Lords. He expended time and money in an ultimately futile effort to secure the title of Earl of Bath. Despite some success, his tenure in the War Office was marred by accusations of corruption and expensive contested elections. He was made a Privy Counsellor in 1712.

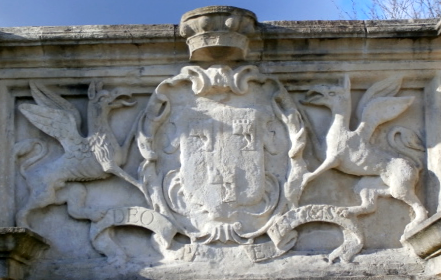
Heraldic achievement of George Granville, 1st Baron Lansdowne, detail from parapet of Queen Anne's Walk, Barnstaple, Devon, completed circa 1713. Motto of Granville, Baron Lansdowne: Deo, Patriae, Amicis ("For God, my Country and Friends"). The motto of his uncle John Granville, 1st Earl of Bath was: Futurum invisibile ("The future is unseen")

In 1714 Queen Anne was succeeded by the Hanoverian King George I, who favoured the Whigs. Almost all the Tories who held office under Anne were dismissed, including Lord Lansdown. Embittered, he began a secret correspondence with the Jacobite Old Pretender "James III". On 6 October 1721 James, who refused to recognise his peerage "Baron Lansdown" bestowed by Queen Anne, created him "Lord of Lansdown"," Viscount [ ]" and "Earl of Bath" in the Jacobite Peerage of England, with remainder to his heirs male. On 3 November 1721 James created him "Duke of Albemarle", "Marquis Monck and Fitzhemmon", "Earl of Bath", "Viscount Bevel", and "Baron Lansdown of Bideford" in the Jacobite Peerage of England, which supposed titles had no legal validity in the Kingdom of Great Britain. One of these titles referred to his family's supposed descent (officially confirmed to the 1st Earl of Bath by warrant of King Charles II in 1661) from Richard I de Grenville (d.post 1142) of Neath Castle, one of the Twelve Knights of Glamorgan and a brother and follower of Robert FitzHamon the Norman conqueror of Glamorgan. The titles Monck and Albemarle referred to the fact that the 1st Earl of Bath had been granted reversion of his cousin Monck's Dukedom of Albemarle, should the Duke have died without male progeny. The title "Lansdown" referred to Lansdown Hill near Bath in Somerset where his grandfather, Sir Bevil Grenville, had met his heroic death at the Battle of Lansdown in 1643. The titles created on 3 November 1721 were with remainder to the heirs male of his body, whom failing to his brother, Bernard Granville, and the heirs male of his body.

== Marriage ==
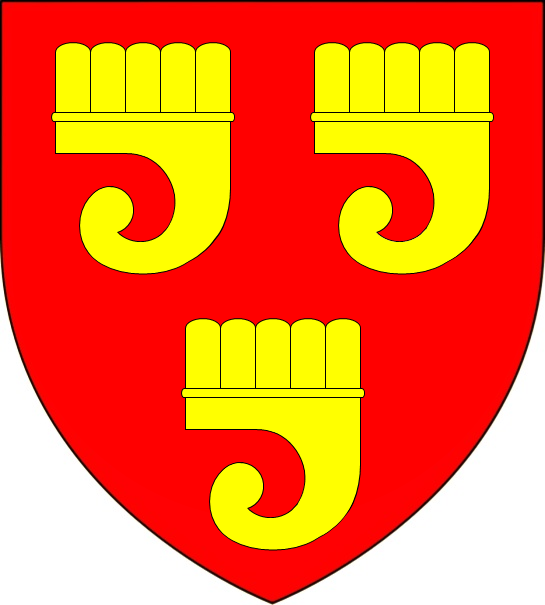
Arms of Granville: Gules, three clarions or

On 15 December 1711 in the church of St Martin-in-the-Fields in Westminster, London, he married (as her 2nd husband) Mary Villiers, the daughter of Edward Villiers, 1st Earl of Jersey (1656–1711) and Barbara Villiers, Countess of Jersey, and the widow of Thomas Thynne (d. 1710).

== Death and burial ==
He died in London on 29 January 1735, his wife having predeceased him by a few days, and was buried with her in the Church of St Clement Danes on 3 February 1735. He left no male progeny, and thus at his death the Barony of Lansdowne became extinct. His Jacobite titles, such as they were, were inherited by his nephew Bernard Granville, son of his brother Bernard. The younger Bernard died in 1776, when the Jacobite peerages created on 3 November 1721 became extinct, while those created on 6 October 1721 passed to his heir male.

== Works ==
- George Granville Lansdowne, Baron (1732). A letter to the author of Reflexions historical and political : Occasioned by a treatise In Vindication of General Monk, and Sir Richard Granville, &c. By the Right Honourable George Granville, Lord Lansdowne. London : Printed for J. Tonson in the Strand; And L. Gilliver in Fleetstreet, MDCCXXXII.
- George Granville Lansdowne, Baron (1779-1780).The poetical works : of the Right Hon. Geo. Granville, Lord Landsdowne. With the life of the author.Edinburg : At the Apollo Press, by the Martins.
- George Granville Lansdowne, Baron. Select poems of George Granville, Lord Lansdowne. With a life of the author.Works of the British poets ... v. 17, p. [157]-203
- George Granville Lansdowne, Baron (1736). The genuine works in verse and prose, of the Right Honourable George Granville, Lord Lansdowne.London : Printed for J. and R. Tonson, at Shakespear's Head in the Strand, and L. Gilliver, J. Clarke, at Homer's Head in Fleetstreet, MDCCXXXVI
- George Granville Lansdowne, Baron (1807).The poetical works of George Granville, Lord Landsdowne [sic] : with the life of the author. Printed for Cadell and Davies ... and Samuel Bagster.
- George Granville Lansdowne, Baron (1785).Ode to Lansdown-hill, with notes, mostly relative to the Granville family : to which are added, two letters of advice from George lord Lansdown, anno MDCCXI, to William Henry earl of Bath.London : Printed by J. Nichols, for W. Randall, Pall-Mall
- George Granville Lansdowne, Baron (1732). A letter to the author of Reflexions historical and political, occasioned by a treatise in vindication of General Monk and Sir Richard Granville, &c.London : Printed for J. Tonson ..., and L. Gilliver.
- George Granville Lansdowne, Baron (1736).The genuine works in verse and prose.London : Tonson.

Parliament of England
Preceded by John Williams; John Hicks	Member of Parliament for Fowey; 1702–1707; With: John Hicks	Succeeded by Parliament of Great Britain
Parliament of Great Britain
Preceded by Parliament of England	Member of Parliament for Fowey; 1707–1710; With: John Hicks 1707–1708; Henry Vincent 1708–1710	Succeeded by Henry Vincent; Viscount Dupplin
Preceded by Sidney Godolphin; Sir John Evelyn	Member of Parliament for Helston; 1710; With: Sidney Godolphin	Succeeded by Sidney Godolphin; Robert Child
Preceded by Hugh Boscawen; James Buller	Member of Parliament for Cornwall; 1710–1712; With: John Trevanion	Succeeded by John Trevanion; Sir Richard Vyvyan, Bt
Military offices
Preceded by Sir Bevil Granville	Governor of Pendennis Castle; 1703–1714	Succeeded by Richard Munden
Political offices
Preceded by Robert Walpole	Secretary at War; 1710–1712	Succeeded by Sir William Wyndham, Bt
Preceded by Sir John Holland, Bt	Comptroller of the Household; 1711–1712	Succeeded by Sir John Stonhouse, Bt
Preceded by The 1st Earl of Cholmondeley	Treasurer of the Household; 1712–1714	Succeeded by The 1st Earl of Cholmondeley
Peerage of England
New creation	— TITULAR — Duke of Albemarle; Jacobite peerage 1721–1735	Succeeded by Bernard Granville
New creation	Baron Lansdowne; 1712–1735	Extinct
