= Alexander Pendarves =

British politician (1662–1725)

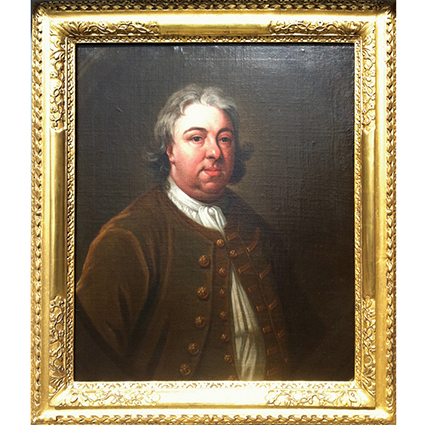
- Alexander Pendarves

Personal details
- Born: 1662
- Died: 13 March 1725 (aged 62–63) London, England
- Party: Tory
- Spouse(s): Lady Dorothy Bourke; Mary Granville Delany
- Occupation: Politician

Alexander Pendarves, MP (baptised 11 November 1662 – 13 March 1725) was a Cornish landowner and Tory politician who sat in the House of Commons between 1689 and 1725.

== Early life ==
Pendarves, of Roscrow, Cornwall, United Kingdom was the son of John Pendarves and Bridget, daughter of Sir Alexander Carew, 2nd Baronet of Antony, Cornwall. He had two brothers, Rev. John Pendarves (born 1682), Rector of Drewsteignton, and William (died 1693).

He graduated from Exeter College, Oxford in 1682 and was called to Bar of Gray's Inn in the same year.

== Career ==
Pendarves was a wealthy landowner. He served as Director of Land-Bank in 1696, Stannator for Tywarnhaile in 1703, Commissioner of Prizes from September 1703 to July 1705, Commissioner for Sewers for the London Borough of Tower Hamlets in 1712, and Surveyor General of the Land Revenues of the Crown from January 1714 to January 1715.

Pendarves was most notable as a Member of Parliament, serving four different constituencies over the course of his career. In 1689 he was returned as MP for Penryn and sat until 1698 when he chose not to stand in the general election. However, he contested a subsequent by-election and was returned again for Penryn on 16 January 1699. In 1701 he stood at Penryn and Saltash but chose to represent Penryn until 1705. He was elected at Saltash in 1708 and remained until 1710 when he was returned again at Saltash. However he was also returned at Penryn and chose to represent that seat. He was returned again at Penryn in 1713 but when he was required to stand for re-election on appointment to office in 1714, he lost the by-election. He then won a by-election at Helston. In 1721, he was returned as MP for Launceston, which he held until his death. In 1711, he was listed as member of the October Club, an organization of Tory MPs active at this time. The group made resolutions calling for inquiries into suspected financial abuses and was "a major threat to the Harley administration".

== Personal life ==
He first married Lady Dorothy Bourke, daughter of Richard Burke, 8th Earl of Clanricarde.

He married, secondly, to Mary (1700–1788), daughter of Bernard Granville (died 1723). Her uncle, Bernard's brother, was George Granville, 1st Baron Lansdowne. Mary was introduced to Pendarves while visiting Lord Lansdowne in December 1717. Shortly thereafter, in February 1718, at the age of 17, she married Pendarves, age 60, a marriage brought on by her parents' financial dependence on Lord Lansdowne, and Lord Lansdowne's hope to have political influence through the nuptials. Lord Lansdowne was of the mindset that should Mary outlive her spouse, the estate she would inherit would repay her for years of misery.

Two months after the wedding, the couple left for Roscrow Castle. There, Pendarves suffered from gout and it worsened. In 1721, the two moved to London where Pendarves began to drink excessively while his wife reunited with many of her old friends. Pendarves died suddenly in his sleep in 1725. Upon his death in London, Roscrow Castle passed to Pendarves' niece, Mary, daughter of Rev. John Pendarves. As Pendarves had not changed his will to accommodate his wife Mary, she was left a poor widow. In later years, however, the Bluestocking artist and writer became notable for her "paper-mosaicks".

Parliament of England
Preceded by Henry Fanshawe; Sir Nicholas Slanning, Bt	Member of Parliament for Penryn; 1689–1698; With: Anthony Rowe 1689–90; Samuel Rolle 1690; Sidney Godolphin 1690–95; James Vernon from 1695	Succeeded by James Vernon; Samuel Trefusis
Preceded by John Morice; James Buller	Member of Parliament for Saltash; January – March 1701; With: James Buller	Succeeded by James Buller; Thomas Carew
Parliament of Great Britain
Preceded by Joseph Moyle; James Buller	Member of Parliament for Saltash; 1708–1710; With: James Buller May – December 1708; Sir Cholmeley Dering, Bt 1708–10; Jonathan Elford from 1710	Succeeded by Jonathan Elford; Sir William Carew, Bt
Preceded by James Vernon; Samuel Trefusis	Member of Parliament for Penryn; 1710–1714; With: Samuel Trefusis	Succeeded by Samuel Trefusis; James Vernon
Preceded by Charles Coxe; Henry Campion	Member of Parliament for Helston; 1714–1715; With: Thomas Tonkin	Succeeded by Sir Gilbert Heathcote, Bt; Sidney Godolphin
Preceded by Edward Herle; John Anstis	Member of Parliament for Launceston; 1721–1725; With: John Anstis to 1722; John Freind 1722–24; John Willes from 1724	Succeeded by John Willes; John Freind
