= Hugh Piper (MP) =

English Royalist soldier and politician

Sir Hugh Piper (c. 1617 – 24 July 1687) was an English Royalist soldier and Tory politician.

== Biography ==
Piper was the eldest son of Arthur Piper of Launceston, Cornwall and Frances Hatherley. His father was a prominent merchant in east Cornwall. Both Piper and his father fought as Royalists during the First English Civil War, with Piper serving as a captain of a regiment of foot by 1643. He served under Bevil Grenville, including at the Battle of Lansdowne, and he was wounded at least three times during the war. In 1650, Piper was compounded by the Committee for Compounding with Delinquents, paying a fine of over £71 for supporting the king during the conflict.

After the Stuart Restoration in 1660, Piper was given a commission in the regiment of John Granville, 1st Earl of Bath at Plymouth garrison. He was also appointed to the local office of commissioner for assessment in Cornwall in 1661 and Devon in 1667. In 1672, Piper became deputy governor of the Royal Citadel, Plymouth with a pension of £100 a year. He was knighted by Charles II of England during the king's visit to Plymouth on 17 August 1677. He was a captain in the Cornish militia by 1679.

In October 1679, Piper was elected as a Member of Parliament for Launceston in the House of Commons of England. He represented the borough during the Exclusion Bill Parliament and Oxford Parliament as a firm court supporter who opposed the exclusion of James, Duke of York from the throne. He was appointed to no committees and made no recorded speeches. He was elected to the Loyal Parliament in 1685 as a Tory. He died on 24 July 1687.

Parliament of England
Preceded by Bernard Granville; Charles Harbord	Member of Parliament for Launceston with Sir John Coryton, Bt (1679); Lord Lansdowne (1680–1681); William Harbord (1681); John Granville (1685–1687); 1679–1687	Succeeded by William Harbord; Edward Russell
