= Lord Lansdowne =

Lord Lansdowne may refer to:

- George Granville, 1st Baron Lansdowne (1666–1735), English poet, playwright and politician
- Marquess of Lansdowne, a title in the Peerage of Great Britain
  - William Petty, 1st Marquess of Lansdowne (1737–1805), former British prime minister
  - Henry Petty-Fitzmaurice, 3rd Marquess of Lansdowne (1780–1863), former chancellor of the exchequer, former home secretary and three times Lord President of the Council
  - Henry Petty-Fitzmaurice, 5th Marquess of Lansdowne (1845–1927), the fifth governor general of canada, former viceroy of India, former secretary of state for war, and former secretary of state for foreign affairs
