= John Granville, 1st Baron Granville of Potheridge =

English soldier, landowner and politician

Colonel John Granville, 1st Baron Granville of Potheridge, PC (12 April 1665 – 3 December 1707), styled The Honourable John Granville until 1703, was an English soldier, landowner and politician.

== Background and education ==
Granville was the second son of John Granville, 1st Earl of Bath, by Jane Wyche, daughter of Sir Peter Wyche. He was the grandson of Sir Bevil Grenville and the younger brother of Charles Granville, 2nd Earl of Bath. He was educated at Christ Church, Oxford.

== Political career ==
Granville fought alongside his elder brother in the Imperial Army during the Battle of Vienna in 1683. Two years later he was returned to Parliament for Launceston, a seat he held until 1687. He welcomed the Glorious Revolution of 1688 and led a force of Grenadiers in support of William of Orange at the Siege of Cork in September, 1690. He had been appointed Captain of Deal Castle in February, 1690, but lost the position for political reasons, along with his colonelcy in the Guards and his captaincy of a man-of-war, in December of that year.

In 1689 he was elected to Parliament for Plymouth. He notably made four speeches attacking the conditions of the Royal Navy and was a member of the committee set up to make recommendations on relieving wounded seamen. He continued to sit for Plymouth until 1698, and then represented Newport until 1700, Fowey from January to December 1701 and Cornwall from 1701 to 1703. He was in opposition during the whole reign of William III. When Queen Anne succeeded to the throne in 1702, Granville was sworn of the Privy Council. In 1703 he was raised to the peerage as Baron Granville of Potheridge, of Potheridge in the County of Devon, and appointed Lord-Lieutenant of Cornwall, Lord Warden of the Stannaries and Lieutenant-General of the Ordnance, posts he held until 1705. The latter year he again went into opposition.

== Family ==
Lord Granville of Potheridge married Rebecca Child, daughter of Sir Josiah Child, 1st Baronet, and widow of Charles Somerset, Marquess of Worcester, in 1703. They had no children. He died in December 1707 after an apoplectic seizure, aged 42. As he had no children the barony died with him. He was buried at St Clement Danes, London.

Parliament of England
| Preceded by Sir Hugh Piper; William Harbord | Member of Parliament for Launceston; 1685–1687; With: Sir Hugh Piper | Succeeded by William Harbord; Edward Russell |
| Preceded by Sir John Maynard; Arthur Herbert | Member of Parliament for Plymouth; 1689–1698; With: Sir John Maynard 1689–1690; John Trelawny 1690–1695; George Parker 1695–1698 | Succeeded by Charles Trelawny; Sir John Rogers, Bt |
| Preceded by John Morice; The Viscount Newhaven | Member of Parliament for Newport, Cornwall; 1698–1700; With: John Morice 1698–1699; Francis Stratford 1699–1700 | Succeeded by Francis Stratford; John Prideaux |
| Preceded by Thomas Vivian; Sir Bevil Granville | Member of Parliament for Fowey; January–December 1701; With: John Williams | Succeeded by John Williams; John Hicks |
| Preceded by John Speccot; Richard Edgcumbe | Member of Parliament for Cornwall; 1701–1703; With: James Buller | Succeeded by James Buller; Sir Richard Vyvyan, Bt |
Political offices
| Preceded by Sir Henry Goodricke, Bt | Lieutenant-General of the Ordnance; 1702–1705 | Succeeded by Thomas Erle |
Honorary titles
| Preceded by The Earl of Radnor | Lord Lieutenant and Custos Rotulorum of Cornwall; 1702–1705 | Succeeded by The Earl of Godolphin |
| Preceded by The Earl of Radnor | Lord Warden of the Stannaries; 1702–1705 | Succeeded by Viscount Rialton |
Peerage of England
| New creation | Baron Granville of Potheridge; 1703–1707 | Extinct |
