= Grace Carteret, 1st Countess Granville =

Grace Carteret, 1st Countess Granville (13 September [O.S. 3 September] 1654 – 18 October 1744), styled Lady Grace Granville from 1660–80, was Countess Granville in her own right and the wife of George Carteret, 1st Baron Carteret.

== Early life ==
Grace was born in Lincoln's Inn Fields, London, the second daughter of Sir John Granville, and his wife, Jane Wyche. In 1660, her father was raised to the peerage as Earl of Bath.

== Marriage and issue ==
In 1680, Grace married George Carteret, 1st Baron Carteret (1667–1695), 13 years her junior, who succeeded to his grandfather's baronetcy in 1680. In 1681, he was raised to the status of Baron Carteret.

The Carterets had three sons:

- George Carteret (11 February 1689 – 8 June 1689), died in infancy
- John Carteret, later 2nd Earl Granville (1690–1763), who was married twice: first, to Frances Worsley in 1710, and second, to Lady Sophia Fermor, in 1744. He had children by both marriages.
- Philip Carteret (6 November 1692 – 19 March 1711), who died unmarried while a pupil at Westminster School and was buried at Westminster Abbey.

Lord Carteret died, aged 28 (or 26), in 1695.

== Countess Granville ==
In 1701, Grace's brother, Charles Granville, 2nd Earl of Bath, died by suicide a fortnight after the death of their father, and the earldom was inherited by his son, William, a minor. Following William's death in 1711, all Grace's elder siblings having predeceased her, she was created Viscountess Carteret and Countess Granville in her own right in 1714. She was able to pass on both titles to her elder son, John.

Grace Carteret died at the family seat of Hawnes in Bedfordshire, aged 77, a few months after attending her son's second marriage, to Sophia Fermor. She was buried in the vault of General Monk at Westminster Abbey.

Peerage of Great Britain
New creation	Countess Granville; 1715–1744	Succeeded by John Carteret
