= Potheridge =

Estate in Merton, Devon, England

Coordinates: 50.9123°N 4.1155°W

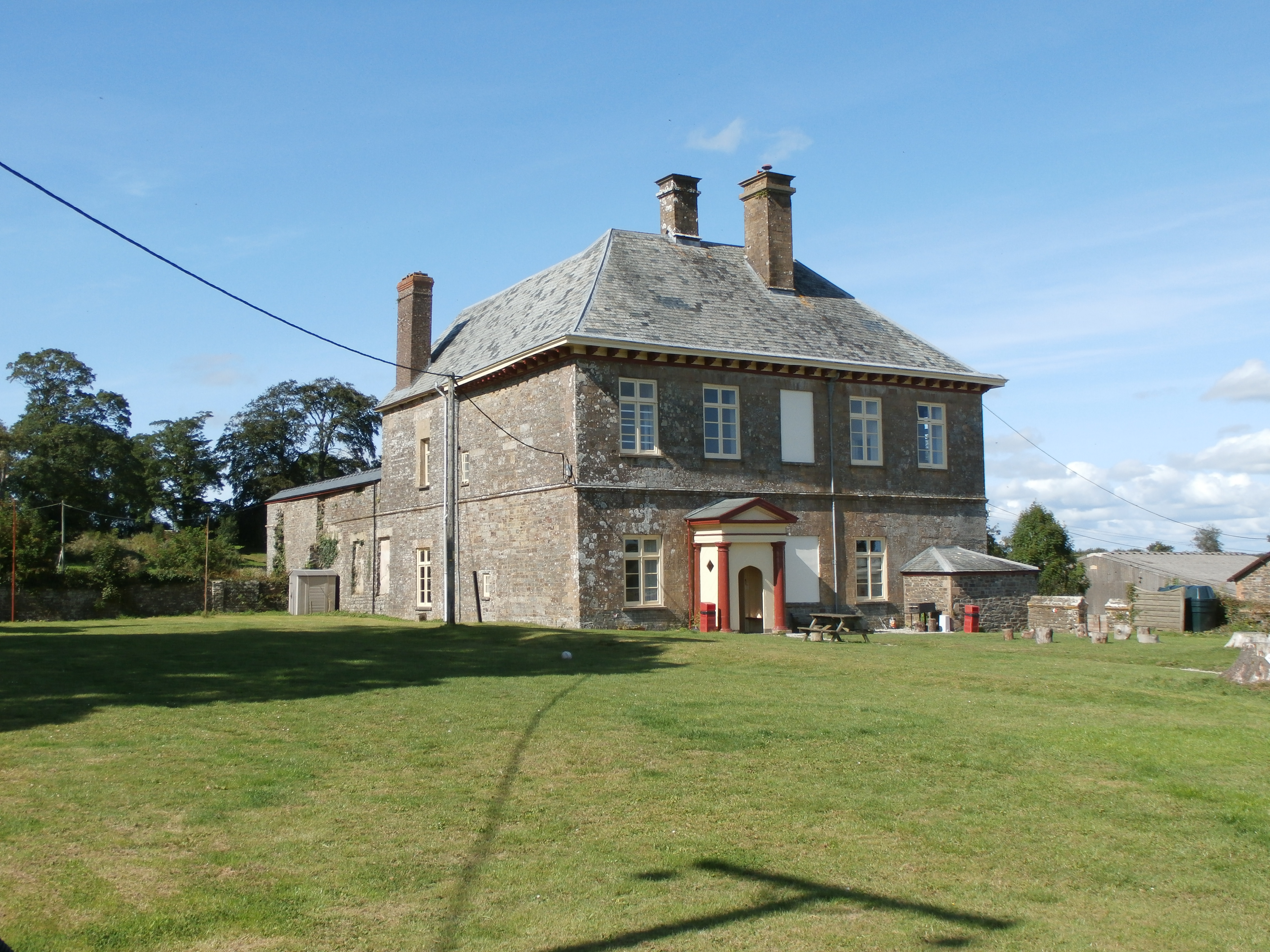
Great Potheridge in 2014, the surviving wing of George Monck's mansion, south front

Potheridge (alias Great Potheridge, Poderigge, Poderidge or Powdrich) is a former Domesday Book estate in the parish of Merton, in the historic hundred of Shebbear, 3 miles south-east of Great Torrington, Devon, England. It is the site of a former grand mansion house re-built by George Monck, 1st Duke of Albemarle (1608–1670) circa 1660 on the site of the former manor house occupied by his family since at the latest 1287. It was mostly demolished in 1734 after the death of the widow of his son Christopher Monck, 2nd Duke of Albemarle (died 1688).

The surviving section forms the present Great Potheridge farmhouse, a Grade I listed building, inside which some remnants of the former mansion remain, including a grand staircase, two massive 17th-century classical-style doorcases and a colossal relief-sculpted wooden overmantel. The latter depicts within a wreath of flowers, against a background of an elaborate antique trophy of arms, five putti, two of which, in flight, hold between them a crown, an allusion to Monck's central role in the Restoration of the Monarchy. The chapel "of Grecian architecture", i.e. classical, was in ruins in 1770 and was almost entirely demolished before 1822, with only the west wall left standing. In 1879, the stables were still standing and were said to "give the visitor some idea of the magnificence of the ancient building".

In 2014 Great Potheridge, with 6 acres of land remaining of the former estate, is used as an outdoor activity centre for young people, operated by Encompass Training. It is today known as "Great Potheridge" to distinguish it from the nearby house, formerly on the estate, known as "Little Potheridge".

== Descent of the manor ==
=== Domesday Book ===
In the Domesday Book of 1086 the estate of Porrige (Potheridge) was listed as the 36th of the 176 Devonshire holdings of Baldwin de Moels, Sheriff of Devon. His tenant was Alberi (Aubrey), who also held from him the estates of Stockleigh and Woolladon, both also in today's Meeth parish. The tenant prior to the Norman Conquest was Ulf.

=== de Estaneston ===
Later as recorded in the Book of Fees it was held from the feudal barony of Okehampton by Ralph de Estaneston.

=== Monk ===
Arms of Monk of Potheridge: Gules, a chevron between three lion's heads erased argent

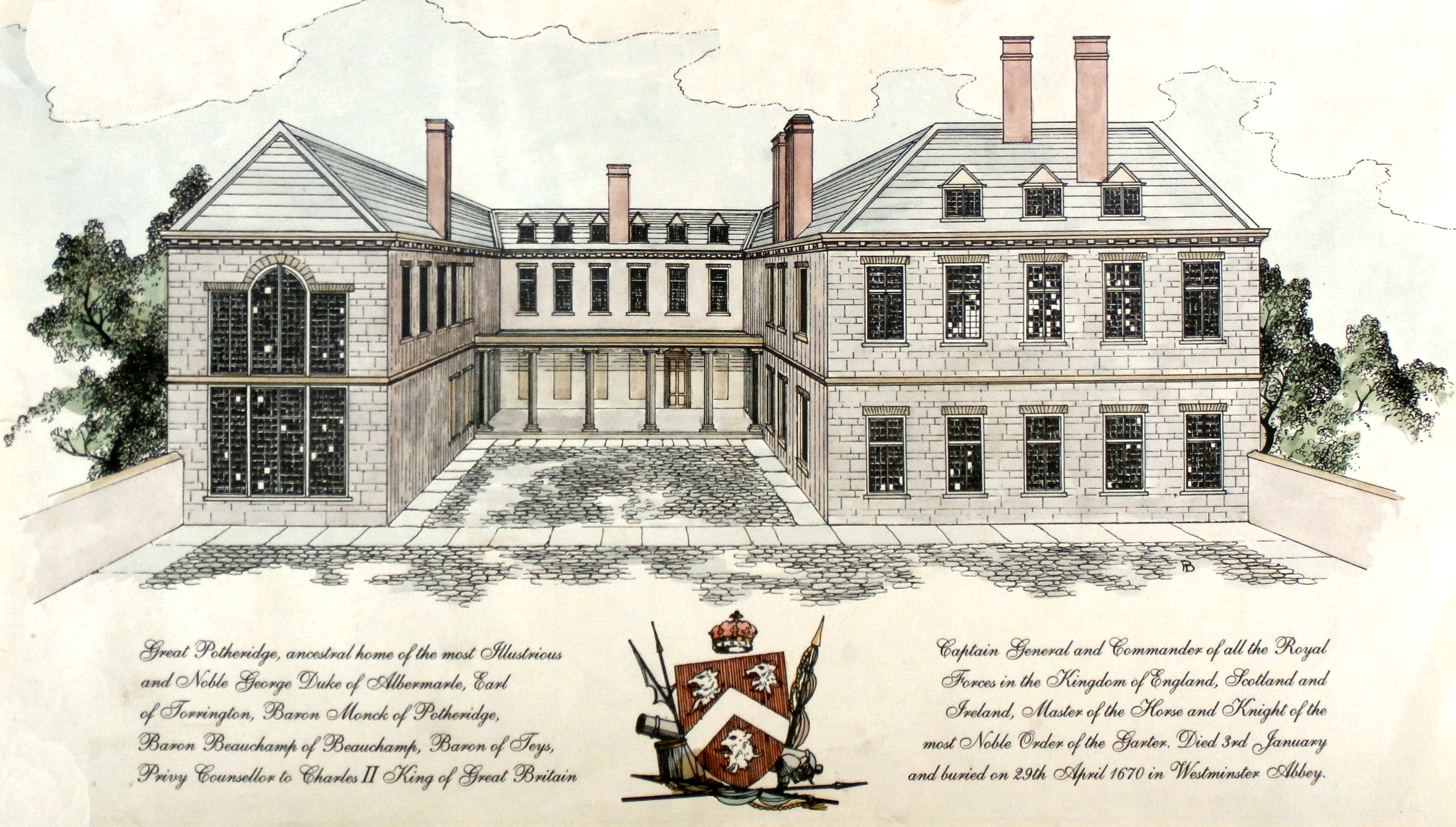
Conjectural reconstruction of Potheridge House, Merton, Devon, built by General George Monck, 1st Duke of Albemarle (1608–1670) between 1660 and 1670. South front. It was partially demolished after 1734. The only surviving part in 2014 is the right hand block. The left hand block was a chapel

According to the Devon antiquarian, Sir William Pole (died 1635), Potheridge was the residence of the family of Monk (alias Monke, Monck, etc.) from at the latest 1287. The family was recorded in ancient Norman-French charters as le Moigne (modern French le moine, "the monk") or de Moigne and was Latinized as Monachus, from ancient Greek μοναχός (monachos), "single, solitary" and Anglicised as "Monk", or "Monck". According to Tristram Risdon (died 1640) in about 1216 Roger le Moyney held one fee in the Devon parish of West Anstey and was succeeded by William le Moyney. As recorded in the Book of Fees William le Moigne and Roger le Moyne held land in West Anstey from Ralph de Champeus who held from the feudal barony of Barnstaple. The family is memorialised by today's "Money Common" in that parish. Another part of Anstey was held by the feudal barony of Okehampton. The descent of the family of "Monk of Potheridge" is given as follows in the Heraldic Visitation of Devon:

- William I le Mogne
- Hugh le Moyne de Powdridg
- William II le Moyne, dominus de Powddetridg
- Peter le Moyne
- Adam le Mayne (sic)
- Hugh le moyne
- Thomas le Moyne
- Hugh le Moyne (fl. 3 Edward I, i.e. 1274)
- William III le Moyne
- Hugh le Moine (sic)
- William IV le Moyne
- William V le Moyne
- William VI le Moyne
- William VII le Moyne (son) (fl. 3 Henry 6)
- John le Monke (son) (fl. 17 Edward IV)
- Humfry Muncke (son) of Powdrich, who married Mary Champernowne
- Anthony Muncke (son) of Powdriche, who married Elizabeth Wood, daughter of Edward Wood of London
- Thomas Monk (son) of Powdrich, who married Frances Plantagenet, a daughter of Arthur Plantagenet, 1st Viscount Lisle (died 1542), KG, (by his wife Elizabeth Grey, 6th Baroness Lisle) and widow of John Basset (1462–1528) of Umberleigh.
- Anthony Monke (son) of Powdrig who married Mary Arscott, daughter of Richard Arscott of Arscott, Ashwater.
- Sir Thomas Monke (1570–1627), (son) of Powdridge, MP for Camelford in 1626. Sir Thomas married was Elizabeth Smith, a daughter (by his first marriage) of Sir George Smith (died 1619) of Madworthy, near Exeter, Devon, a merchant who served as MP for Exeter in 1604, was three times Mayor of Exeter and was Exeter's richest citizen, possessing 25 manors. His 4th son, and a subsequent heir to Potheridge, was the royalist general George Monck, 1st Duke of Albemarle (1608–1670), KG, the key figure in effecting the Restoration of the Monarchy to King Charles II in 1660. Elizabeth's half-sister Grace Smith was the wife of Sir Bevil Grenville (1596–1643), lord of the manors of Bideford in Devon and Stowe, Kilkhampton in Cornwall, the Royalist soldier killed in action during the Civil War in heroic circumstances at the Battle of Lansdowne in 1643. Sir Bevil's son and heir, and thus the first cousin of Sir Thomas Monk's famous son the Duke of Albemarle, was John Grenville, 1st Earl of Bath (1628–1701), a fellow promoter with the Duke of the Restoration of the Monarchy to King Charles II in 1660, whose elevation to the peerage was largely due to the Duke's influence.
- Col. Thomas Monk (born 1606), (3rd and eldest surviving son and heir), who in 1626 married Mary Gould, a daughter of William Gould of Hayes. He had two sons, who succeeded him successively, and three daughters: Elizabeth Monk, wife of General Sir Thomas Pride (died 1658) a parliamentarian commander in the Civil War, best known as one of the Regicides of King Charles I and as the instigator of "Pride's Purge"; Frances Monk (1633–1677), buried in Westminster Abbey, first wife of John Le Neve (1679–1741) the antiquary and author of Fasti Ecclesiæ Anglicanæ; Marie Monk (1630–1659), whose monument exists in the parish church of Totnes, Devon.
- Lt. Thomas Monk (died 1644) (eldest son and heir), a lieutenant to his father. He was slain during the Civil War in South Street in Exeter on the night of 9 July 1644 through some mistake as to the password, and was buried 10 July 1644 at Great Torrington. Died without progeny.
- George Monk (1647–1659/69) (brother), buried at Dalkeith, Midlothian, Scotland, next to the 1st Duke of Albemarle's former Scottish headquarters Dalkeith Castle. Died without progeny.
- George Monck, 1st Duke of Albemarle (1608–1670), KG, (uncle) the key figure in effecting the Restoration of the Monarchy to King Charles II in 1660. He re-built the mansion at Potheridge on a grand scale, at about the same time his first cousin and colleague in effecting the Restoration of the Monarchy John Grenville, 1st Earl of Bath (1628–1701) rebuilt Stowe House in Kilkhampton, Cornwall, about 18 miles west of Potheridge. Both houses were demolished within a few decades of their re-building.
- Christopher Monck, 2nd Duke of Albemarle (1653–1688), (son & heir). He died without issue, having settled a considerable part of his estate on his cousin John Grenville, 1st Earl of Bath (1628–1701). He lived at Albemarle House (formerly called Clarendon House) one of the grandest of London townhouses after which was named Albemarle Street off Piccadilly in Mayfair. After the death in 1734 of his widow Lady Elizabeth Cavendish, who had re-married to Ralph Montagu, 1st Duke of Montagu (1638 – c. 1709), much of Potheridge House was demolished.

=== Granville ===
Arms of Granville: Gules, three clarions or

The ancient Grenville family (later modernised to Granville), lords of the manors of Bideford in Devon and Stowe in Cornwall, was earliest related to the Monk family through Honor Grenville (c. 1493/5-1566), wife of Arthur Plantagenet, 1st Viscount Lisle (died 1542), KG, and mother of Frances Plantagenet, wife of Thomas Monk of Potheridge. Thomas's great-grandsons renewed the kinship to the Grenvilles through their mother Elizabeth Smith, half-sister of Grace Smith, the wife of Sir Bevil Grenville. The 1st Earl of Bath fixed the spelling of the family name to "Granville".

- John Grenville, 1st Earl of Bath (1628–1701) on whom was settled a considerable part of the Monck estates by his childless cousin Christopher Monck, 2nd Duke of Albemarle (1653–1688).
- John Granville, 1st Baron Granville of Potheridge (1665–1707) (2nd son). In 1703 he was elevated to the peerage as "Baron Granville of Potheridge". He died without issue.
- William Granville, 3rd Earl of Bath (1692–1711) (nephew), following whose death in 1711 aged 19 the male line of the Granville family of Stowe became extinct. The estate of Potheridge fell to the inheritance of the descendants of his aunt Jane Granville (died 1696), a daughter of the 1st Earl of Bath and wife of Sir William Leveson-Gower, 4th Baronet (c. 1647 – 1691).

=== Leveson-Gower ===
Arms of Leveson-Gower, Earl Granville: Quarterly 1st & 4th barry of eight argent and gules a cross flory sable (Gower); 2nd: azure, three laurel leaves or (Leveson); 3rd: Gules, three clarions or (Granville)

The Leveson-Gower family, having inherited Potheridge, quickly sold it to the Rolle family of Stevenstone, great landowners in Devon. They did not however forget their Granville inheritance, and memorialised it in subsequent names and titles: Jane Granville's great-grandson was Granville Leveson-Gower, 1st Marquess of Stafford (1721–1803) one of whose younger sons was Granville Leveson-Gower, 1st Earl Granville (1773–1846) (younger half-brother of George Leveson-Gower, 1st Duke of Sutherland (1758–1833)), whose son was Granville Leveson-Gower, 2nd Earl Granville (1815–1891), Secretary of State for Foreign Affairs.

=== Rolle ===
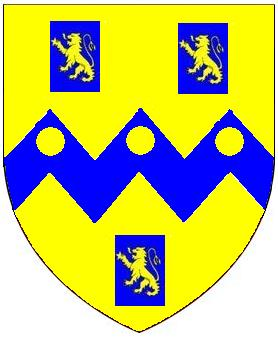
Arms of Rolle: Or, on a fesse dancetté between three billets azure each charged with a lion rampant of the first three bezants

Potheridge was acquired from the Leveson-Gower family by the Rolle family of nearby Stevenstone and of Bicton in South Devon. In 1850 it was held by the trustees of John Rolle, 1st Baron Rolle (c. 1750 – 1842) for the benefit of his adoptive heir Hon. Mark Rolle (1835–1907) (born Mark George Kerr Trefusis), a younger son of Charles Rodolph Trefusis, 19th Baron Clinton (1791–1866) of Heanton Satchville, Huish, the parish adjoining Merton on the south. Mark Rolle was the largest private landowner in Devon, according to the Return of Owners of Land, 1873, being the beneficial owner under the trustees of Lord Rolle's will of over 55,000 acres. The 19th Lord Clinton was lord of the manor of Merton in 1850, having inherited it with other estates from the Rolle family of Heanton Satchville, Petrockstowe, and his grandson (Mark Rolle's nephew) Charles John Robert Hepburn-Stuart-Forbes-Trefusis, 21st Baron Clinton (1863–1957) was Mark Rolle's heir and in 1947 leased his principal seat of Bicton for use as the Bicton College of Agriculture, and in 1952 Great Potheridge was being used as part of the campus buildings of Bicton College, situated some 40 miles south-east of Potheridge near the south coast of Devon. In 1968 the tenant of Clinton Devon Estates at Potheridge was Mr C.W. Lewis, a breeder of Devon cattle who farmed 500 acres.

== Gallery ==
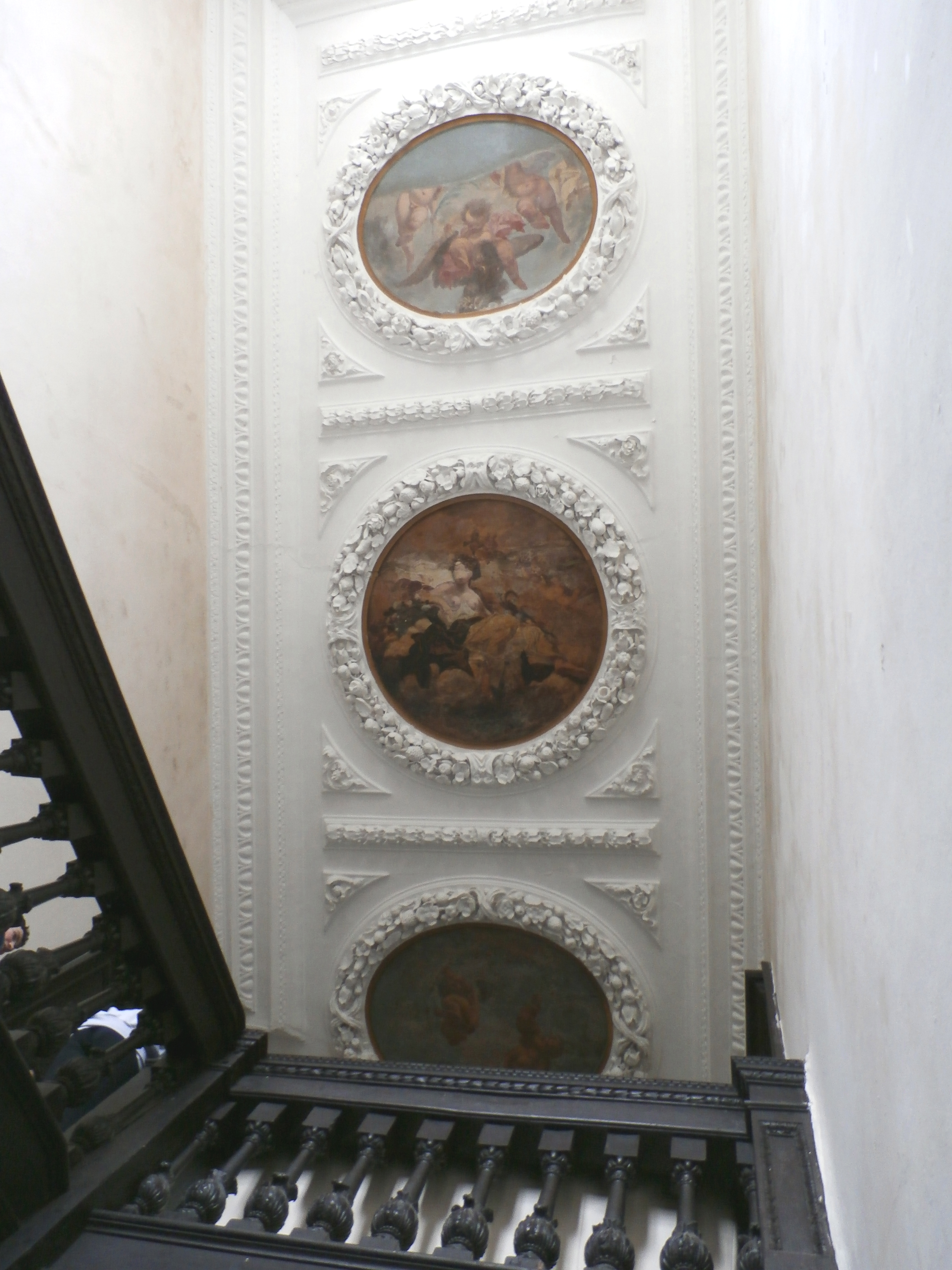
Great Potheridge House, staircase ceiling c.1660-70 with plasterwork wreaths enclosing allegorical paintings with putti, one riding on the back of an eagle holding a crown in its talons, the middle one of a bare breasted female

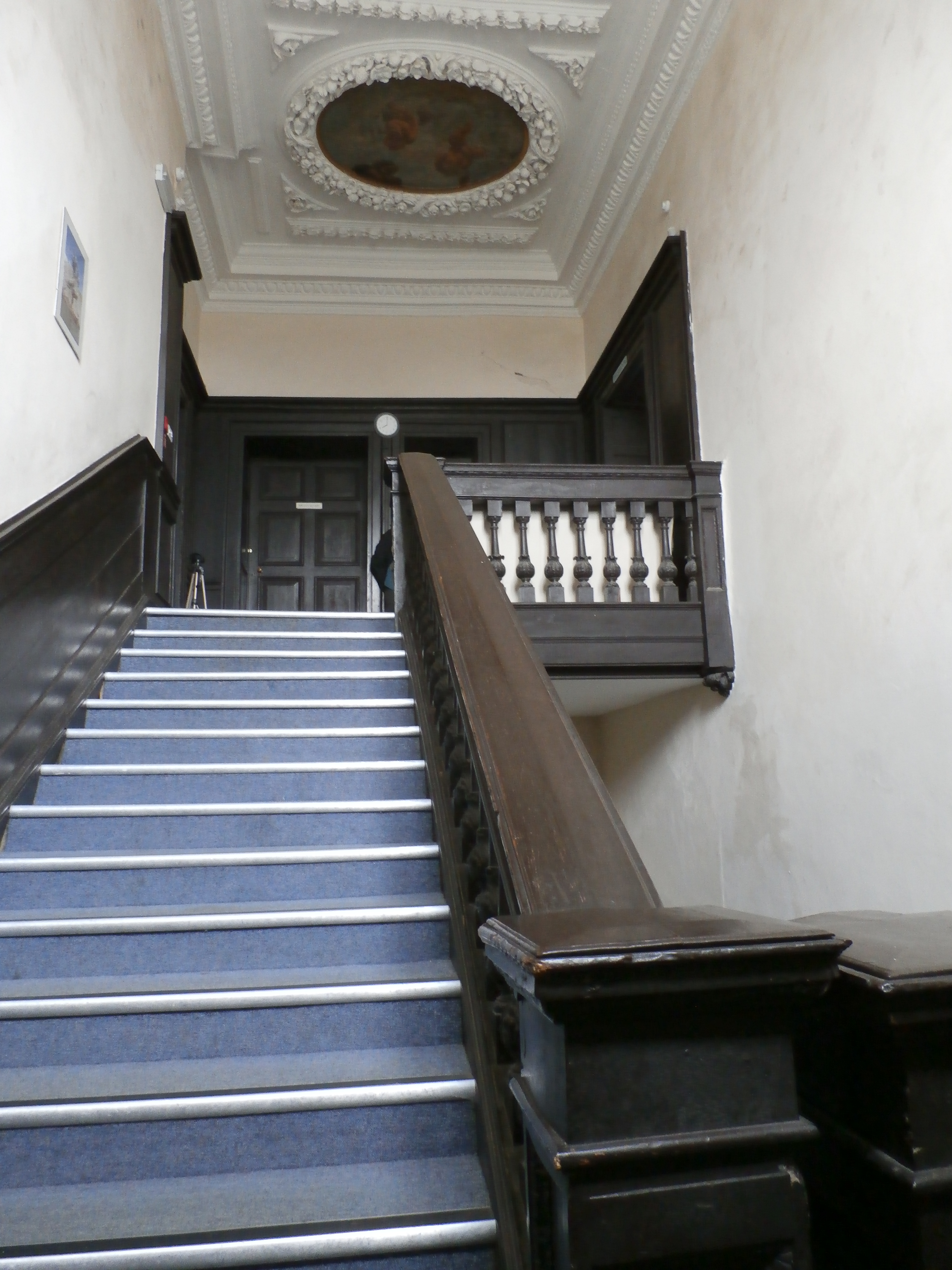
Great Potheridge House, staircase circa 1660-70

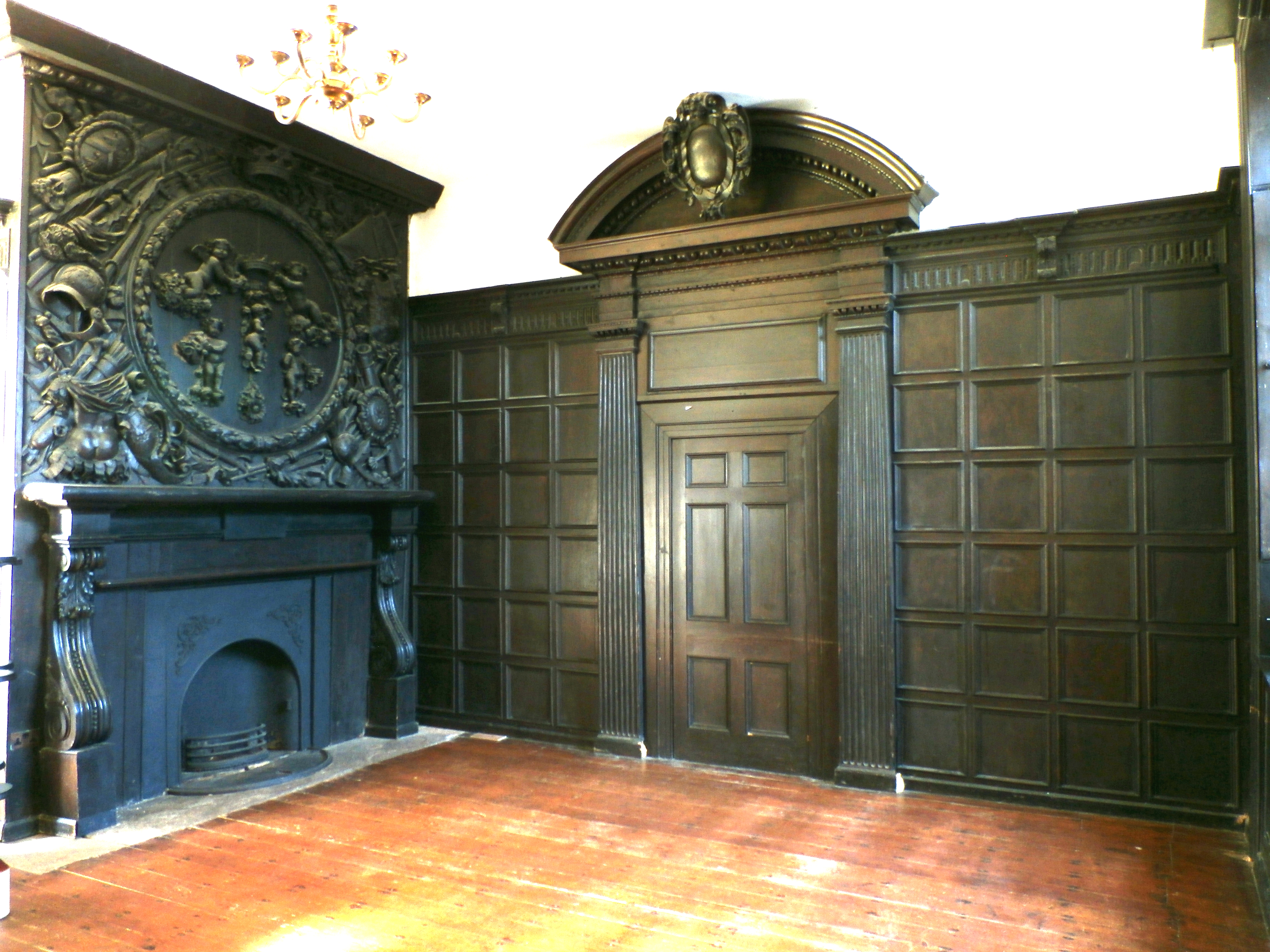
Overmantel at Potheridge with antique trophy of arms and crowning putti
