= Charles Carney =

Charles Carney may refer to:

- Charles J. Carney (1913–1987), U.S. Representative from Ohio
- Charles Carney (Jacobite), Irish Jacobite
- Chuck Carney (1900–1984), American football and basketball player
