= Edward Russell, 1st Earl of Orford =

Royal Navy officer and politician

The Right Honourable The Earl of Orford PC JP
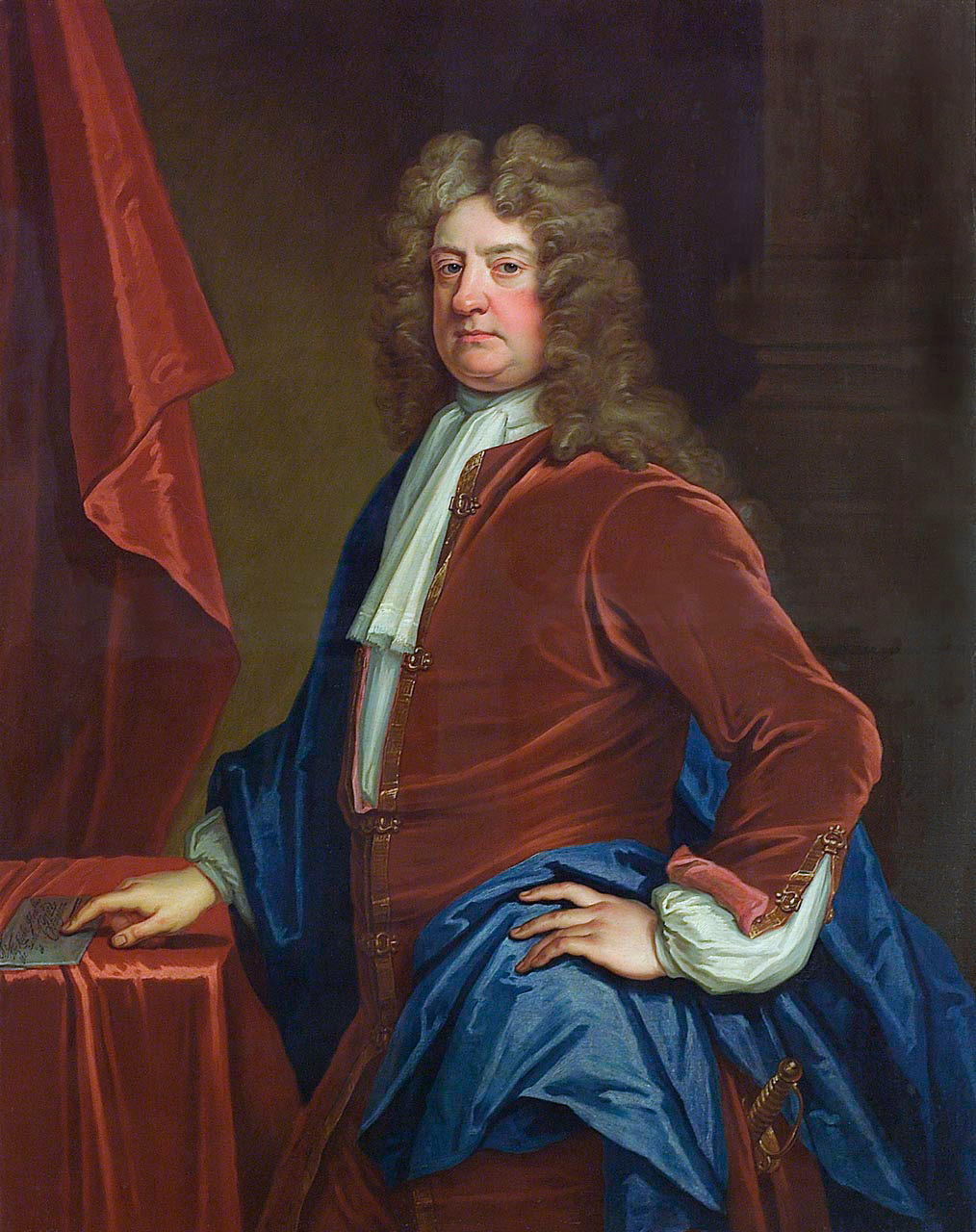
- Portrait by Thomas Gibson, c. 1715

First Lord of the Admiralty
- In office 1694 to 1699 – 1709 to 1710 – 1714 to 1717

Lord Lieutenant of Cambridgeshire
- In office 1715–1727

Member of Parliament for Cambridgeshire
- In office November 1695 – May 1697

Member of Parliament for Portsmouth
- In office March 1690 – October 1695

Treasurer of the Navy
- In office 1689–1699

Member of Parliament for Launceston
- In office January 1689 – February 1689

Personal details
- Born: 10 February 1657 Chiswick, London, England
- Died: 26 November 1727 (aged 70) Covent Garden, London, England
- Resting place: St Michael's, Chenies
- Party: Whig
- Spouse: Lady Margaret Russell
- Education: St John's College, Cambridge
- Occupation: Sailor and politician

Military service
- Allegiance: Kingdom of England; Kingdom of Great Britain
- Branch/service: Royal Navy (1666–1707); Royal Navy (1707–1717)
- Years of service: 1666–1717
- Rank: Admiral of the Fleet
- Commands: Commander-in-Chief, Channel Fleet; Phoenix; Reserve; Defiance; Swiftsure; Newcastle
- Battles/wars: Third Anglo-Dutch War; Battle of Solebay; Nine Years' War; Battles of Barfleur and La Hogue

Admiral of the Fleet Edward Russell, 1st Earl of Orford, PC, JP (1653 – 26 November 1727) was a Royal Navy officer and politician. After serving as a junior officer at the Battle of Solebay during the Third Anglo-Dutch War, he served as a captain in the Mediterranean Sea in operations against the Barbary pirates.

Russell was one of the Immortal Seven, a group of English noblemen who issued the Invitation to William, a document asking Prince William of Orange to depose King James II. Based in the Netherlands, he served as Prince William's secretary during the planning of William's invasion of England and subsequent Glorious Revolution. He was fully engaged in providing naval support for the Williamite War in Ireland until the war ended. He was Commander-in-Chief of the Anglo-Dutch force that fought the French fleet at the Battle of Barfleur and destroyed much of it in a night attack at the Battle of La Hogue during the Nine Years' War.

Russell went on to be First Lord of the Admiralty during the reign of William III and then held the office twice again in the reigns of Queen Anne and King George I. He was also MP for Launceston, for Portsmouth and then for Cambridgeshire.

== Early career ==
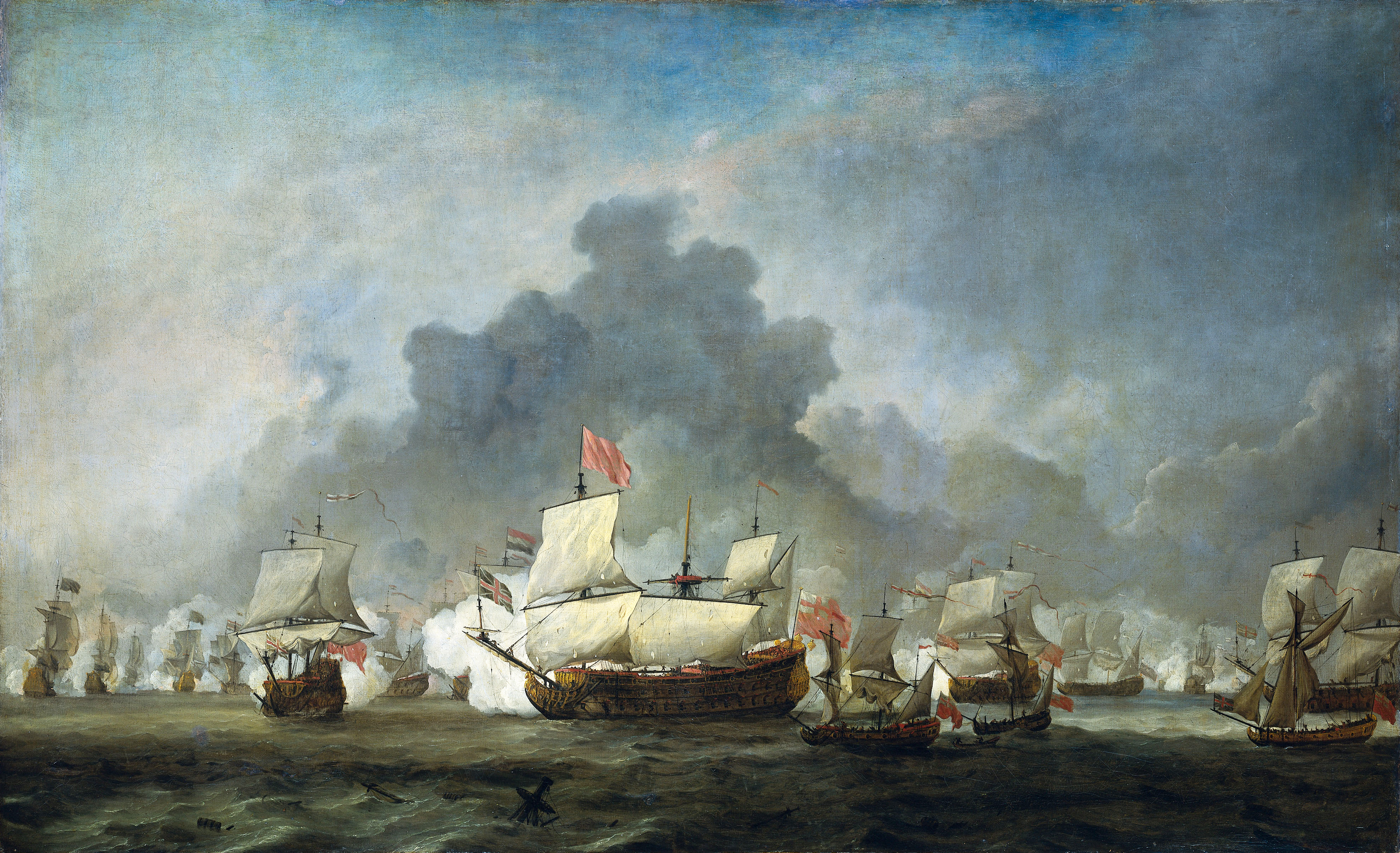
The Battle of Solebay, where Russell saw action as a junior officer

Born the son of the Hon. Edward Russell, a younger son of the 4th Earl of Bedford and Penelope Russell (née Hill), daughter of Sir Moyses Hill of Hillsborough, County Down and widow of Sir William Brooke, Russell briefly attended St John's College, Cambridge and joined the Royal Navy in 1666. Promoted to lieutenant in 1671, he was appointed to the fourth-rate HMS Advice and then transferred to the third-rate HMS Rupert and saw action, when a combined British and French fleet was surprised and attacked by the Dutch, led by Admiral Michiel de Ruyter, at the Battle of Solebay off the Suffolk coast in May 1672, during the Third Anglo-Dutch War.

Promoted to captain on 10 June 1672, Russell was given command of the fifth-rate HMS Phoenix and then transferred to the command of the fourth-rate HMS Reserve in the Mediterranean, in operations against the Barbary pirates in February 1675, then to the command of the third-rate HMS Defiance in December 1677. He then moved to the third-rate HMS Swiftsure in March 1678 and then to the fourth-rate HMS Newcastle in August 1680. In 1683 he ceased to be employed, as all of the members of the Russell family had fallen into disfavour with the King, after the discovery of Lord Russell's connection with the Rye House Plot.

== Senior command ==
Russell was one of the Immortal Seven, a group of English noblemen who issued the Invitation to William, a document asking William, Prince of Orange, to depose King James II in June 1688. Based in the Netherlands, he served as the prince's secretary during the planning of William's invasion of England and subsequent Glorious Revolution in November 1688.

Russell was elected Whig Member of Parliament for Launceston and appointed Treasurer of the Navy in 1689. Promoted directly to full admiral in May 1689, Russell took command in the Channel, with his flag in the second-rate HMS Duke, in 1689 and enforced a blockade of France. Russell lived at Chippenham Park in Cambridgeshire from 1689 until his death. He re-modelled the manor house and greatly extended Chippenham Park, which still dominates the parish to the south of the village.

Russell was elected Member of Parliament for Portsmouth in the general election in March 1690. He conveyed Maria Anna of Neuburg, Charles II of Spain's future consort, from Flushing to Coruna in Spring 1690. He joined the Board of Admiralty led by the Earl of Pembroke, as Senior Naval Lord, in June 1690. Following the debacle at the Battle of Beachy Head in July 1690, Admiral the Earl of Torrington fell out of favour and Russell, having been promoted to Admiral of the Fleet, became Commander-in-Chief of the Navy in December 1690. He was fully engaged in providing naval support for the Williamite War in Ireland until the war ended in October 1691.

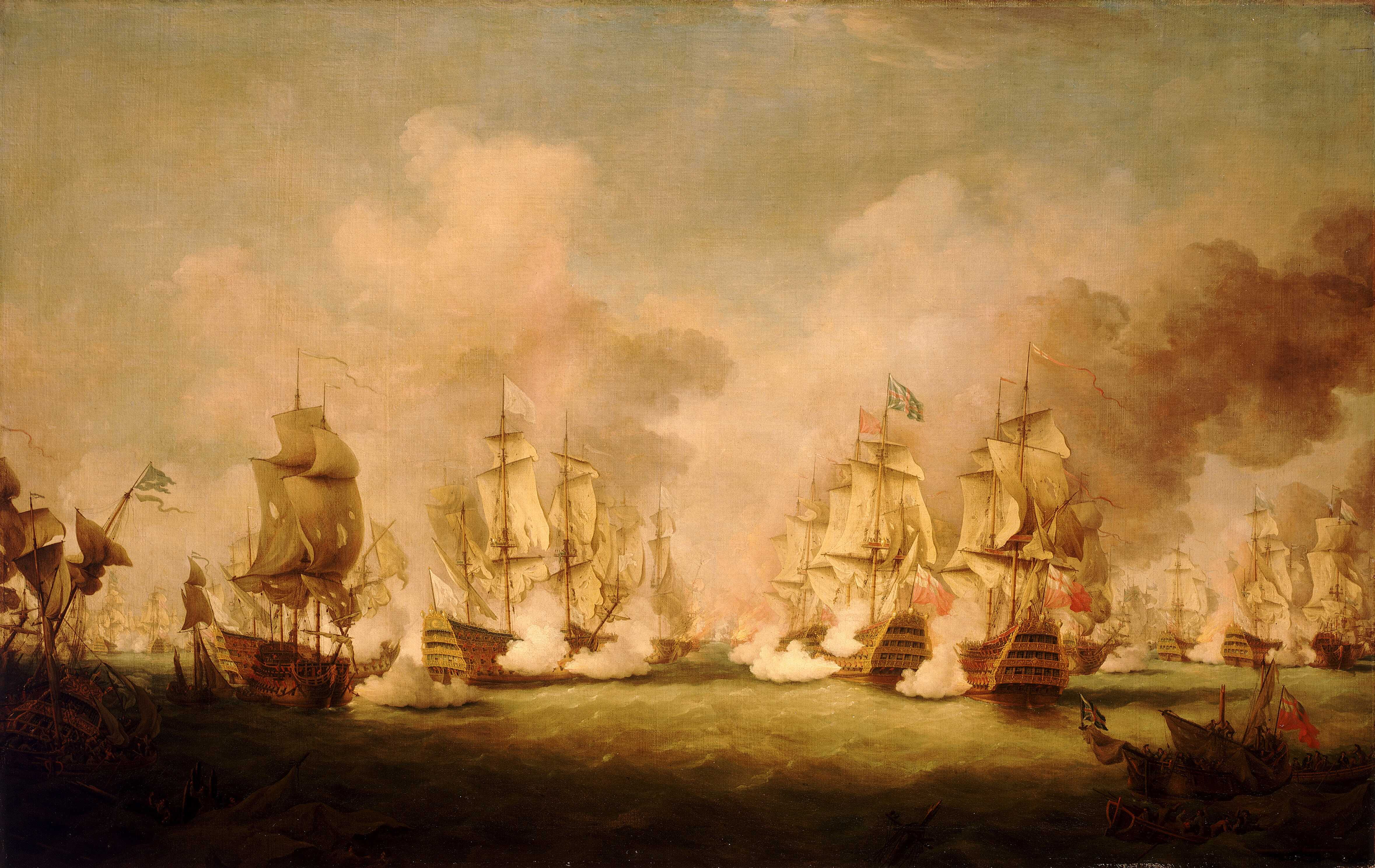
The Battle of Barfleur, where Russell commanded the English fleet

In the Autumn of 1690, Russell blamed the Dutch for the failure of the allies to enforce the blockade of France and was forced to stand down as a Lord Commissioner in January 1691. Flying his flag in the first-rate HMS Britannia, he was Commander-in-Chief of the Anglo-Dutch force that fought the French fleet at the Battle of Barfleur in May 1692, during the Nine Years' War. At about 10 am the French Admiral the Comte de Tourville, with his flag in the French ship Soleil Royal, attacked Russell's flagship but around 1 pm, Tourville was forced to disengage with extensive damage to his rigging and sails. Russell then destroyed much of the French fleet, in a night attack at the Battle of La Hogue in June 1692.

Following a disagreement with the Earl of Nottingham, Russell resigned as Commander-in-Chief of the Navy in December 1692. Admirals Henry Killigrew, Ralph Delaval and Cloudesley Shovell were put in joint command of the fleet in January 1693. Following the disastrous attack on the Smyrna merchantmen at the Battle of Lagos in June 1693, all three admirals were dismissed from their joint command and Russell resumed command of the fleet in November 1693.

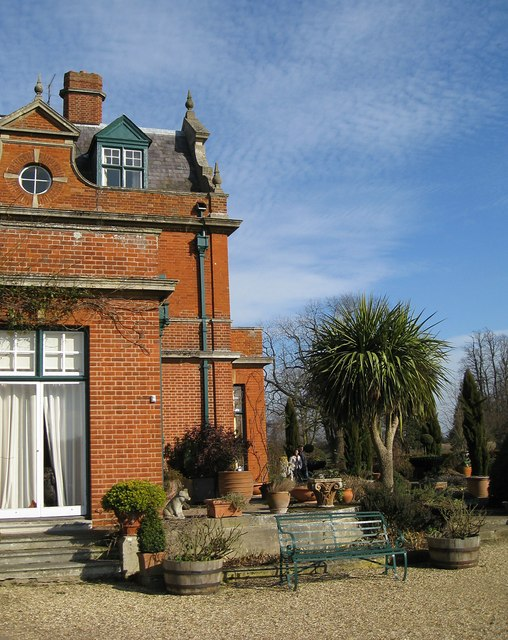
Chippenham Park, Russell's home in Cambridgeshire

Russell became First Lord of the Admiralty and Senior Naval Lord in the First Whig Junto in May 1694 and took a fleet out into the Mediterranean in June 1694, becoming the first English naval commander to spend the Winter at Cádiz (rather than sailing his squadron home in the autumn). He was elected Member of Parliament for Cambridgeshire in 1695 and was created Baron Shingay, Viscount Barfleur and Earl of Orford on 7 May 1697. He faced allegations of having misappropriated funds from the maintenance of the fleet, to spend on his private estates in 1698. The accusations went no further and he left office as First Lord of the Admiralty, as Treasurer of the Navy and as Senior Naval Lord, when the First Whig Junto fell from power in May 1699. He commissioned the building of Orford House at Ugley in Essex in 1700.

Russell returned to office as First Lord in the coalition Godolphin–Marlborough ministry in November 1709 but left his post when the Tory-dominated Harley ministry came to power in October 1710. He was appointed for a third time as First Lord in the Whig Townshend ministry in October 1714 and having been appointed Lord Lieutenant of Cambridgeshire on 27 September 1715, left his post again when that ministry left office in April 1717. He died at Covent Garden in London on 26 November 1727 and was buried in the Russell vault at St Michael's Church in Chenies.

== Family ==
In November 1691, Russell married his cousin, Lady Margaret Russell, youngest daughter of the 5th Earl of Bedford (later the 1st Duke of Bedford); they had no children. They lived from the time of their marriage until Russell's death at 43 King Street, Covent Garden.

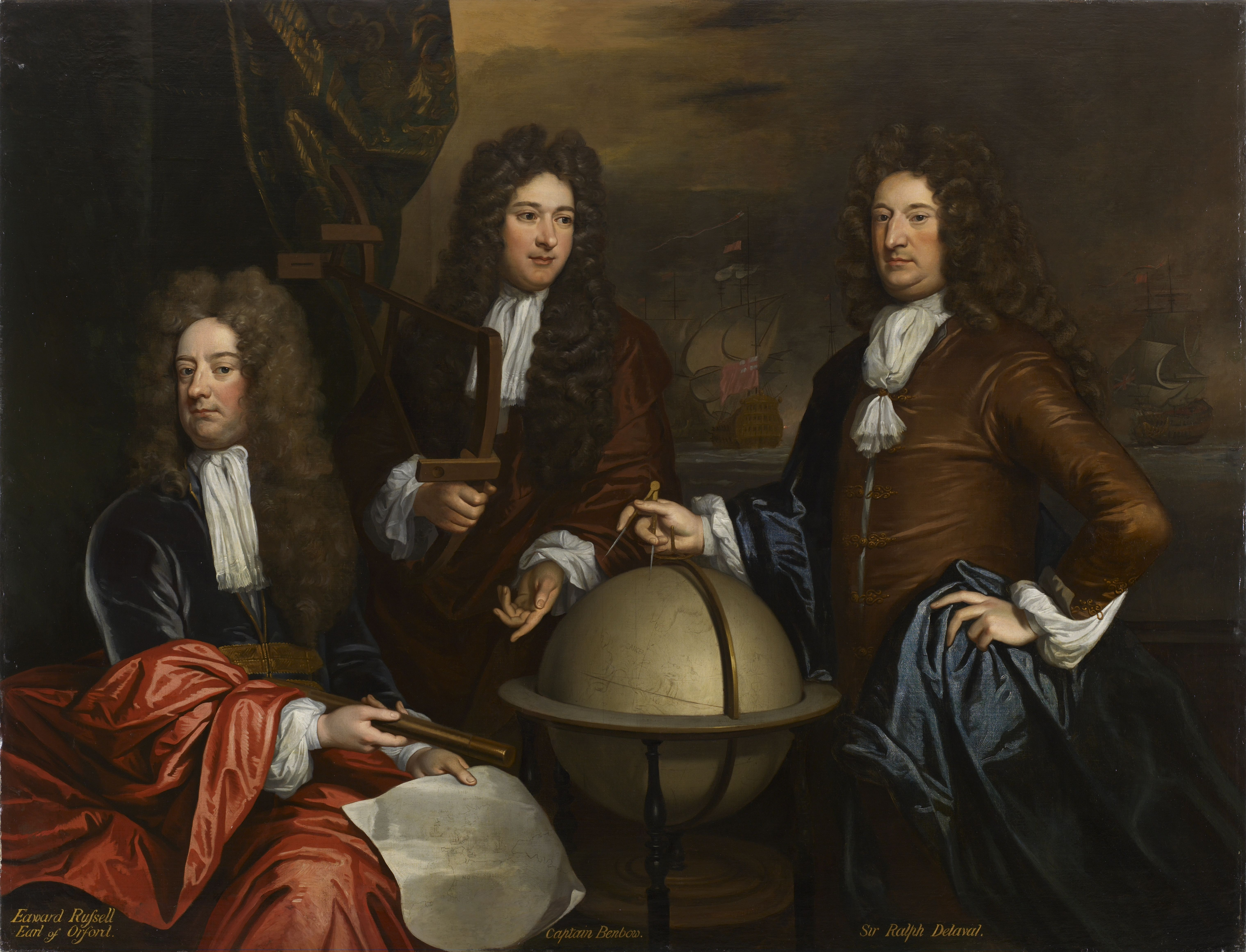
Painting by Godfrey Kneller showing Orford (left) with Admiral John Benbow and Admiral Ralph Delaval

== Sources ==
- Gorton, John (1830). A general biographical dictionary: containing a summary account of the lives of eminent persons. Whittaker, Treacher & Co. OCLC 776199633.
- Parry, John Docwra (1831). History and description of Woburn and its abbey, etc. London, Longman, Rees, Orme, Brown, and Green. OCLC 32255781.
- Rodger, N.A.M. (1979). The Admiralty. Offices of State. Lavenham: T. Dalton Ltd. ISBN 0900963948.
- Russell, Lady Rachel (1826). Letters of Lady Rachel Russell, Manuscript in the Library at Woburn Abbey. J. F. Dove.

Parliament of England
Preceded by Sir Hugh Piper; John Granville	Member of Parliament for Launceston; 1689–1690; With: William Harbord	Succeeded by William Harbord; Bernard Granville
Preceded by Henry Slingsby; Richard Norton	Member of Parliament for Portsmouth; 1690–1695; With: Nicholas Hedger	Succeeded by Nicholas Hedger; Matthew Aylmer
Preceded by Sir Robert Cotton; The Lord Cutts	Member of Parliament for Cambridgeshire; 1695–1697; With: The Lord Cutts	Succeeded by The Lord Cutts; Sir Rushout Cullen, Bt
Honorary titles
Preceded by Sir Thomas Chicheley	Custos Rotulorum of Cambridgeshire; 1689–1727	Succeeded by The Earl of Lincoln
Preceded by The Lord North	Lord Lieutenant of Cambridgeshire; 1715–1727	Succeeded by The Earl of Lincoln
Military offices
Preceded by Sir John Chicheley	Senior Naval Lord; 1690–1691	Succeeded by Henry Priestman
Preceded by Henry Priestman	Senior Naval Lord; 1694–1699	Succeeded by Sir George Rooke
Political offices
Preceded by The Viscount Falkland	Treasurer of the Navy; 1689–1699	Succeeded by Sir Thomas Littleton
Preceded by The Viscount Falkland	First Lord of the Admiralty; 1694–1699	Succeeded by The Earl of Bridgewater
Preceded by The Earl of Pembroke and Montgomery (Lord High Admiral)	First Lord of the Admiralty; 1709–1710	Succeeded by Sir John Leake
Preceded by The Earl of Strafford	First Lord of the Admiralty; 1714–1717	Succeeded by The Earl of Berkeley
Peerage of England
New creation	Earl of Orford; 1697–1727	Extinct
