= John Granville, 1st Earl of Bath =

English Royalist soldier and statesman (1628–1701)

The Right Honourable The Earl of Bath PC
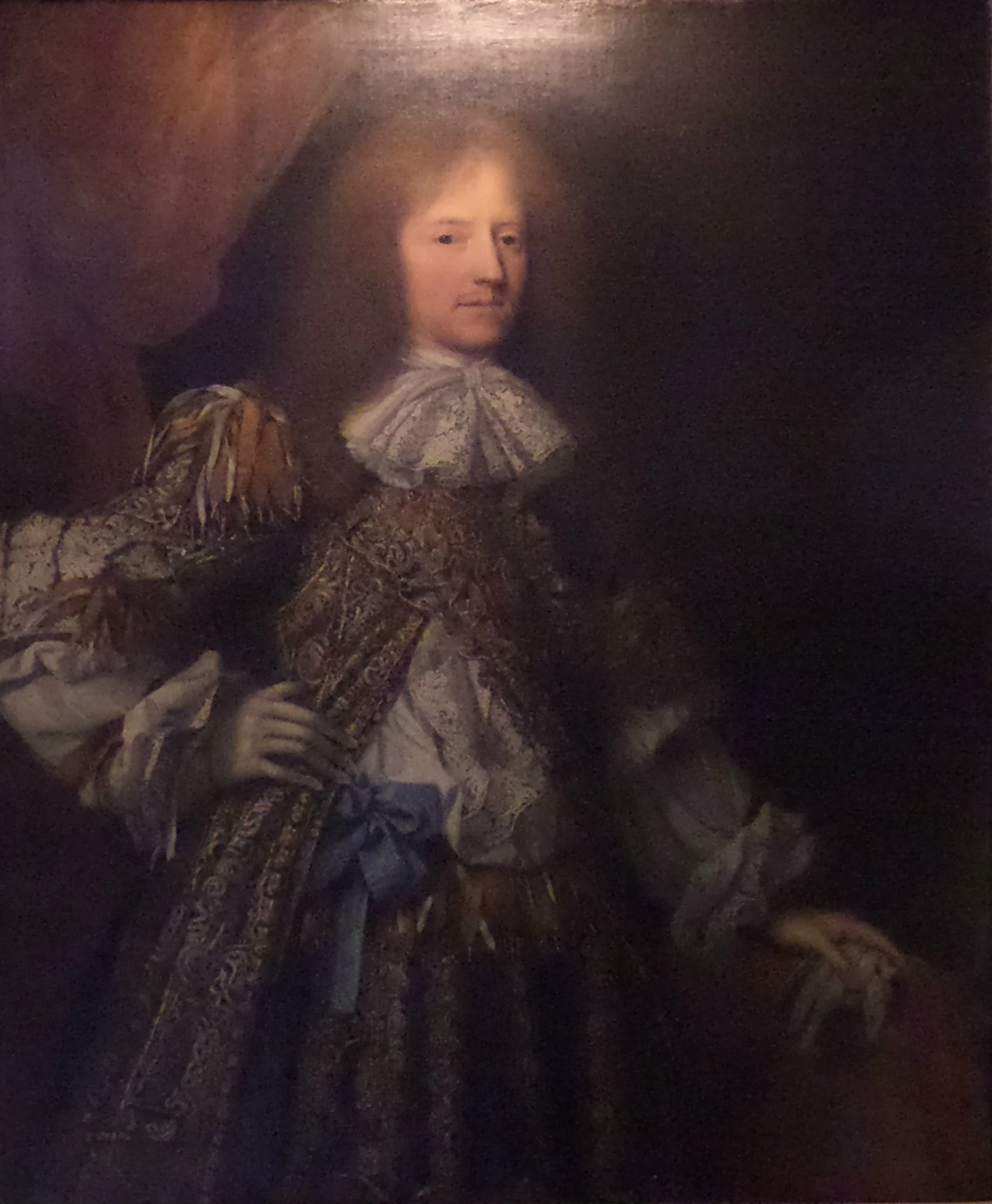
- John Granville, 1st Earl of Bath

Lord Lieutenant of Devon
- In office December 1685 – April 1696

Lord Warden of the Stannaries
- In office October 1660 – August 1701

Lord Lieutenant of Cornwall
- In office October 1660 – May 1696

Governor of the Scilly Isles
- In office 1649–1651

Personal details
- Born: John Grenville; 29 August 1628 Kilkhampton, Cornwall
- Died: 22 August 1701 (aged 72) St James's, London
- Resting place: St James' church, Kilkhampton
- Spouse: Jane Wyche (1652–1692)
- Children: Jane (c. 1653 – 1696); Charles (1661–1701); John (1665–1707); Catherine (1666–?); Grace (1667–1744)
- Parent(s): Sir Bevil Grenville (father); Grace Smythe (mother)
- Occupation: Soldier, landowner and courtier

Military service
- Rank: Colonel
- Battles/wars: Wars of the Three Kingdoms; Lostwithiel; Second Newbury; Torrington;

John Granville, 1st Earl of Bath PC (29 August 1628 – 22 August 1701) was an English landowner who served in the Royalist army during the First English Civil War and was rewarded for his services after the 1660 Stuart Restoration with a title and various appointments.

== Personal details ==
John was born on 29 August 1628 at Kilkhampton in Cornwall, the third son of Sir Bevil Grenville (1596–1643) and Grace Smythe (died 1647). His aunt Elizabeth Smythe was the mother of George Monck who played a leading role in the 1660 Stuart Restoration and it was this connection that later resulted in Grenville being raised to the peerage as Earl of Bath.

One of thirteen children, John's two elder brothers died prematurely, making him heir to his father's considerable estates when Sir Bevil was killed at the Battle of Lansdowne in 1643.

== Career ==
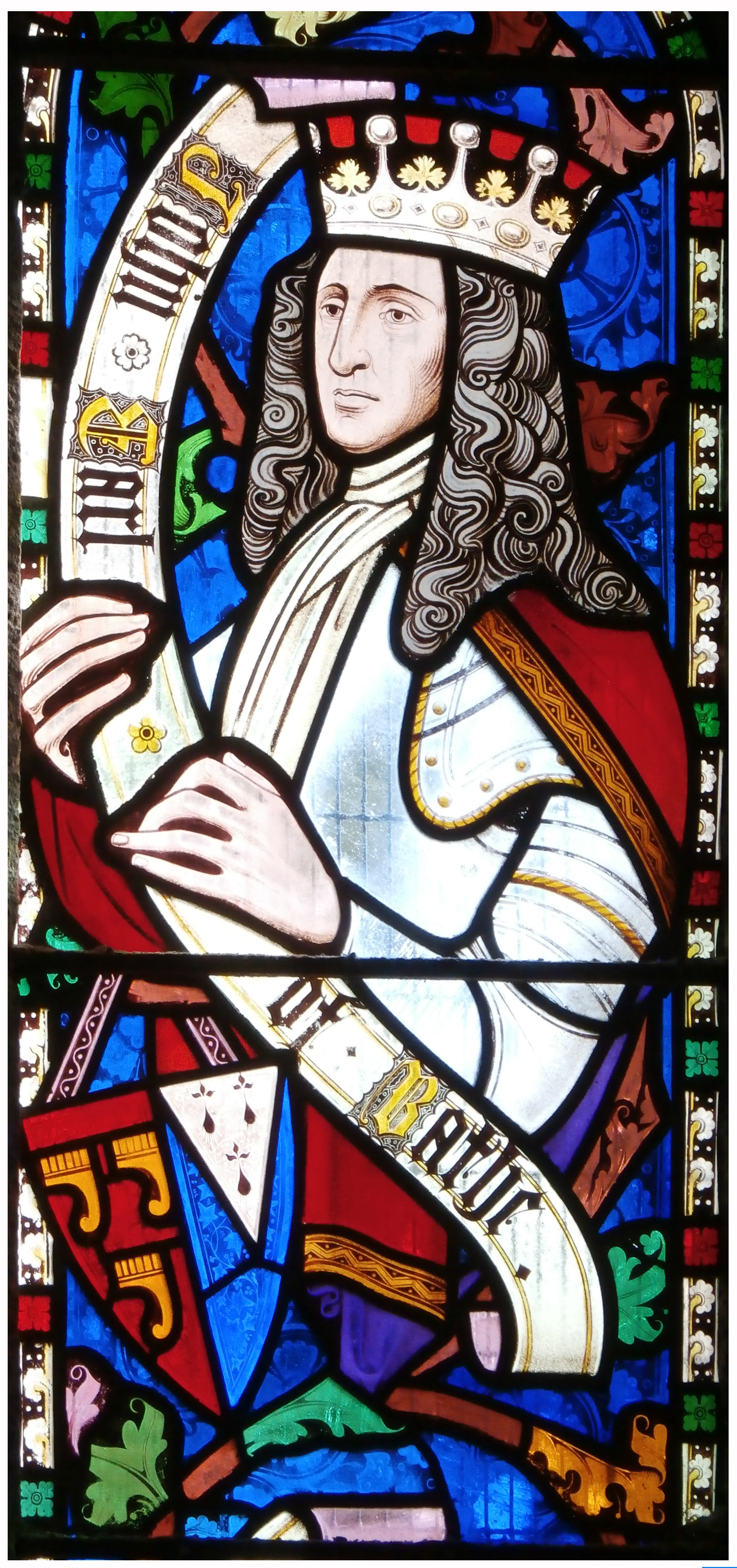
John Granville, 1st Earl of Bath (1628–1701), detail from one of two large stained glass windows depicting the genealogy of the Granville family, in the Granville Chapel, Church of St James the Great, Kilkhampton, Cornwall, erected jointly by his descendants in 1860

During the 1638 to 1651 Wars of the Three Kingdoms, Granville fought in the regiment raised by his father for Charles I (1625–1649). Created a knight after the Storming of Bristol in 1643, he was appointed Gentleman of the Bedchamber to the future Charles II and accompanied him into exile. When the Second English Civil War began in 1648, Charles appointed him Governor of the Scilly Isles, which had rebelled against its Parliamentary garrison. As a base for Royalist privateers attacking English and Dutch vessels in the Western Approaches, this was a vital source of funding for the exiled Court; in May 1651, Parliamentary forces under Robert Blake retook the islands and Granville was captured.

On his release, Granville remained in England and continued to be active in Royalist conspiracies. In 1660, he served as an intermediary in the negotiations between Charles and his distant relative George Monck that led to the Restoration. To his disappointment, the Dukedom of Albemarle went to Monck, whom Charles also rewarded with the then-enormous pension of £7,000 per year. Instead, he was created Baron Granville, Viscount Granville and Earl of Bath in 1661, and a Privy Councillor in 1663.

In 1665, he was appointed Lord Lieutenant of Ireland, although he never went there and spent large sums of time and money on rebuilding the family home of Stowe House in Cornwall. Widely admired, it was dismantled in 1739, although many of its ornamental features, including entire rooms, can be seen at the Guildhall in South Molton, Devon. Albemarle also expanded his own ancestral seat of Potheridge, about 18 miles to the east; unfinished on his death, it was badly damaged by fire and demolished in 1734.

Granville was a signatory to The Several Declarations of The Company of Royal Adventurers of England Trading into Africa, a document published in 1667 which led to the creation of the Royal Africa Company. This is speculated to have been influenced by the fact that Granville was close friends with the Royal African Company's leader, the Duke of York (and future King James II), who was brother to Charles II.

Under James II, Granville served as colonel of the Earl of Bath's Regiment, later 10th Foot, first during the June 1685 Monmouth Rebellion and again in 1688. During the November 1688 Glorious Revolution, he commanded the key ports of Exeter and Plymouth but defected to William III on 18 November.

He was rewarded by being made Lord Lieutenant of Devon but again failed to gain the title of Albemarle and the legal dispute over the Albemarle estate almost bankrupted him. Two weeks after his death in August 1701, his son Charles shot himself, apparently overwhelmed by the debts he had inherited.

== Marriage and progeny ==
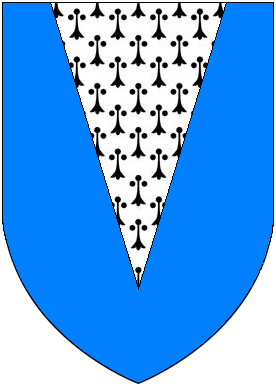
Arms of Wyche: Azure, a pile ermine, as seen in Kilkhampton Church

In October 1652 at Kilkhampton John Granville married Jane Wyche, a daughter of Sir Peter Wyche, English ambassador to the Ottoman Empire. By his wife, he had five children:

=== Sons ===
- Charles Granville, 2nd Earl of Bath (1661–1701), eldest son and heir. He died from a gunshot wound during the preparations for his father's funeral, possibly suicide. He was twice married, firstly to Lady Martha Osborne, daughter of Thomas Osborne, 1st Duke of Leeds (d. 11 September 1689, aged 25), and secondly, on 10 March 1691, to Isabella van Nassau (bapt. 20 April 1668, d. in childbirth on 30 January 1692 at London), sister of Henry Nassau d'Auverquerque, 1st Earl of Grantham. He had no children by his first wife, but by his second wife was the father of:
  - William Henry Granville, 3rd Earl of Bath (1692–1711), who died of smallpox aged 19 without progeny when the earldom became extinct.
- John Granville, 1st Baron Granville of Potheridge (1665–1707). Potheridge in Devon was the ancient seat of the Monck family, where the 1st Earl of Bath's cousin, close friend and collaborator in the Restoration of the Monarchy, George Monck, 1st Duke of Albemarle (1608–1670) had built a grand mansion. It was settled on the 1st Earl of Bath by the Duke's childless son Christopher Monck, 2nd Duke of Albemarle (1653–1688), and eventually passed to the Leveson-Gower family (see below).

=== Daughters ===
- Lady Jane Granville (d. 27 February 1696), wife of Sir William Leveson-Gower, 4th Baronet and mother of John Leveson-Gower, 1st Baron Gower. The progeny of this marriage were co-heirs to the 3rd Earl of Bath. Her great-grandson was Granville Leveson-Gower, 1st Marquess of Stafford (1721–1803) one of whose younger sons was Granville Leveson-Gower, 1st Earl Granville (1773–1846).
- Lady Catherine Granville, wife of Craven Peyton, Member of Parliament for Boroughbridge 1705–1713. Without progeny.

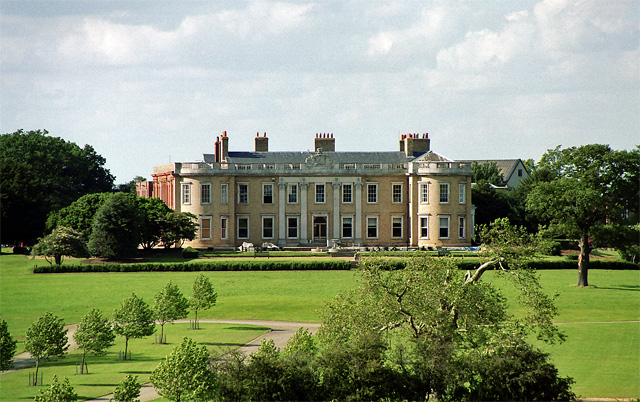
Haynes Park, Bedfordshire, the home of Barons Carteret, descendants of Lady Grace Grenville. In 1908 it still contained a collection of portraits of the Grenville family.

- Lady Grace Granville, suo jure 1st Countess Granville (3 September 1654 – 18 October 1744), wife of George Carteret, 1st Baron Carteret of Haynes Park, Bedfordshire, and mother of John Carteret, 2nd Baron Carteret, 2nd Earl Granville. The progeny of this marriage, Barons Carteret, Earls Granville, and Marquesses of Bath (Thynne), were co-heirs to the 3rd Earl of Bath.

== Death ==
He died in London in 1701, one week before his 73rd birthday.

== Armorials ==
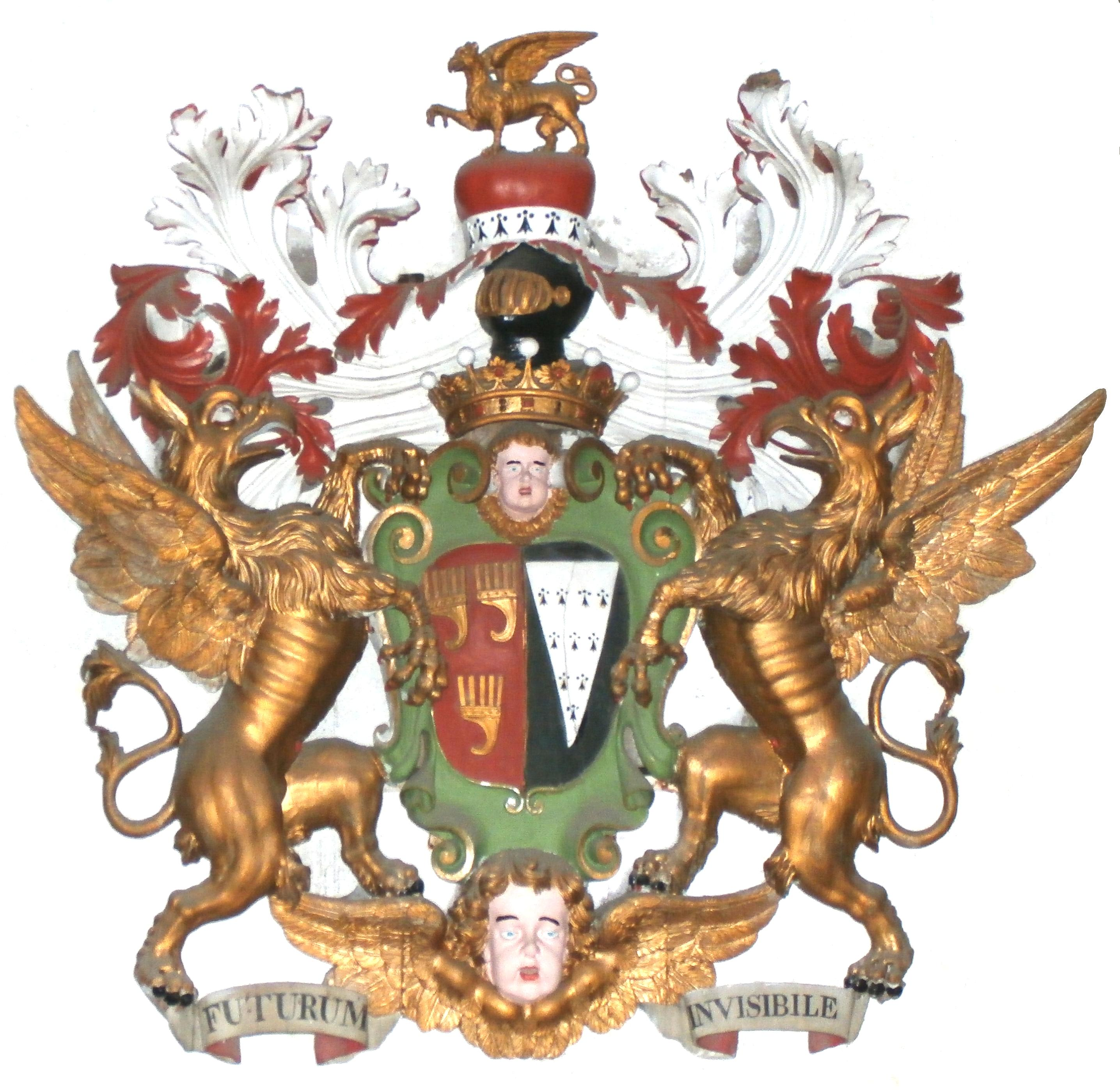
Heraldic achievement of John Granville, 1st Earl of Bath (1628–1701), south wall of Granville Chapel, Church of St James the Great, Kilkhampton, Cornwall. The arms are Gules, three clarions or (Grenville) impaling Azure, a pile ermine (Wyche). The Latin motto on a scroll beneath is Futurum invisibile ("The future is unseen").

The armorials of the family of Granville / Grenville of Glamorgan, Devon and Cornwall are of certain form but uncertain blazon. The charges appear in the form of musical pipes of a wind instrument, similar to pan-pipes. Authoritative sources on heraldry suggest the charges to be variously "clarions" (used by Guillim (d. 1621)), the most usual blazon, which are, however, generally defined as a form of trumpet; "rests" is another common blazon, denoting lance-rests supposedly used by a mounted knight; "organ-rests" is also met with, a seemingly meaningless term (Gibbon (1682)). Other terms are "clavicymbal", "clarichord" and "sufflue" (used by Leigh in his Armory of 1562 and by Boswell, 1572), the latter being a device for blowing (French: souffler) air into an organ. Guillim suggested the charge may be a rudder, but in which case it is shown upside down, when compared to that charge used for example on the tomb at Callington of Robert Willoughby, 1st Baron Willoughby de Broke. Certainly in the brasses on the chest tomb of Sir John Bassett (d. 1529) in Atherington Church, Devon, the charges are engraved in tubular forms with vents or reeds as used in true organ pipes.

== Sources ==
- Round, Horace (1930). Page, William (ed.). Family Origins and Other Studies. Constable & Co.
- Stater, Victor (2004). "Grenville, John, first earl of Bath". Oxford Dictionary of National Biography (online ed.). Oxford University Press. doi:10.1093/ref:odnb/11492. (Subscription, Wikipedia Library access or UK public library membership required.)

Military offices
Preceded by Sir William Morice	Governor of Plymouth; 1661–1696	Succeeded by Charles Trelawny
Preceded by The Lord Arundell of Trerice	Governor of Pendennis Castle; 1680–1696	Succeeded by Sir Bevil Granville
New regiment	Colonel of The Earl of Bath's Regiment; 1685–1688	Succeeded by Sir Charles Carney
Preceded by Sir Charles Carney	Colonel of The Earl of Bath's Regiment; 1688–1693	Succeeded by Sir Bevil Granville
Court offices
English Interregnum	Lord Warden of the Stannaries; 1660–1701	Succeeded by The 2nd Earl of Radnor
Honorary titles
English Interregnum	Lord Lieutenant of Cornwall; 1660–1696; With: Viscount Granville 1691–1693	Succeeded by The 2nd Earl of Radnor
Preceded by The 1st Earl of Radnor	Custos Rotulorum of Cornwall; 1685–1696	Succeeded by The 2nd Earl of Radnor
Preceded by The 1st Duke of Albemarle	Lord Lieutenant and Custos Rotulorum of Devon; 1670–1675	Succeeded by The 2nd Duke of Albemarle
Preceded by The 2nd Duke of Albemarle	Lord Lieutenant of Devon; 1685–1696; With: Viscount Granville 1691–1693	Succeeded by The Earl of Stamford
Preceded by The 2nd Duke of Albemarle	Custos Rotulorum of Devon; 1689–1696	Succeeded by The Earl of Stamford
Peerage of England
New creation	Earl of Bath; 1660–1701	Succeeded by Charles Granville
New creation	Baron Granville (descended by acceleration); 1660–1689	Succeeded by Charles Granville
