= Sir John Coryton, 1st Baronet =

Arms of Coryton: Argent, a saltire sable

Sir John Coryton, 1st Baronet (c. 1621 – 1680) was an English politician who sat in the House of Commons from 1660 to 1680.

Coryton was the son of William Coryton, of West Newton Ferrers, St Mellion, Cornwall by his wife Elizabeth Chichester, 3rd daughter of Sir John Chichester (died 1586) of Raleigh, Devon, Sheriff of Devon in 1585.

He was baptised on 29 July 1621 at St Mellion. He was fined £297 in 1651. In 1660, he was elected Member of Parliament for Callington in a by-election to the Convention Parliament. In 1661 he was elected MP for Cornwall in the Cavalier Parliament. He was created a baronet on 27 February 1662. In February 1679 he was elected MP for Callington again in the First Exclusion Parliament. He was elected MP for Launceston in August 1679 for the Second Exclusion Parliament.

He married twice, firstly on 27 December 1643 at Colebrooke, Devon, to Elizabeth Mills, daughter of John Mills of Colebrooke. She died on 27 September 1667 and was buried in Colebrooke Church, where her mural monument with Corinthian columns and scrollwork pediment survives. By Elizabeth he had two sons and two daughters. His second marriage, by licence dated 24 May 1680 was to Anne Wayte, a widow, of Acton in Middlesex.

Coryton died at the age of about 58 and was buried at St. Mellion on 23 August 1680. He was succeeded in the baronetcy by his son Sir John Coryton, 2nd Baronet (1648–1690).

Parliament of England
Preceded by Robert Rolle; Edward Herle	Member of Parliament for Callington; 1660; With: Robert Rolle; Sir Hugh Pollard	Succeeded by Allen Brodrick; Sir Cyril Wyche
Preceded by Sir John Carew, 3rd Baronet; Hugh Boscawen	Member of Parliament for Cornwall; 1661–1679; With: Jonathan Trelawny	Succeeded by Francis Robartes; Sir Richard Edgcumbe
Preceded by Sir Cyril Wyche; Samuel Rolle	Member of Parliament for Callington; 1679; With: Samuel Rolle	Succeeded by Richard Carew; William Trevisa
Preceded by Bernard Granville; Sir Charles Harbord	Member of Parliament for Launceston; 1679–1680; With: Sir Hugh Piper	Succeeded by Lord Lansdowne; Sir Hugh Piper
Baronetage of England
New creation	Baronet (of Newton); 1662–1680	Succeeded by John Coryton
