= Jane Granville, Countess of Bath =

English noble (1630-1692)

The Right Honourable The Countess of Bath

Lady of the Bedchamber
- In office 1663–1688

Personal details
- Born: Jane Wyche; 1630
- Died: 3 February 1692 (aged 61–62) St James's, City of Westminster
- Spouse: John Granville, 1st Earl of Bath (m. 1652)
- Relations: Peter Wyche (brother); Cyril Wyche (brother)
- Children: Charles Granville, 2nd Earl of Bath; Lady Jane Leveson-Gower; Lady Catherine Peyton; Grace Carteret, 1st Countess Granville; John Granville, 1st Baron Granville of Potheridge
- Parent(s): Peter Wyche; Jane Meredith

Jane Granville, Countess of Bath (née Wyche; 1630 – 3 February 1692), was the wife of John Granville, 1st Earl of Bath, and the mother of the 2nd Earl. She was a Lady of the Bedchamber to Catherine of Braganza, the queen consort of King Charles II of England.

== Early life ==
Jane was a daughter of Peter Wyche, English ambassador to the Ottoman Empire, and his wife, the former Jane Meredith. Among her siblings were Peter Wyche, the English Ambassador to Russia and Poland, and Cyril Wyche, President of the Royal Society.

Her paternal grandparents were merchant Richard Wyche and Elizabeth (née Saltonstall) Wyche (a daughter of Richard Saltonstall, Lord Mayor of London). Her uncle, Nathaniel Wyche, was a merchant and president of the East India Company.

== Marriage and issue ==
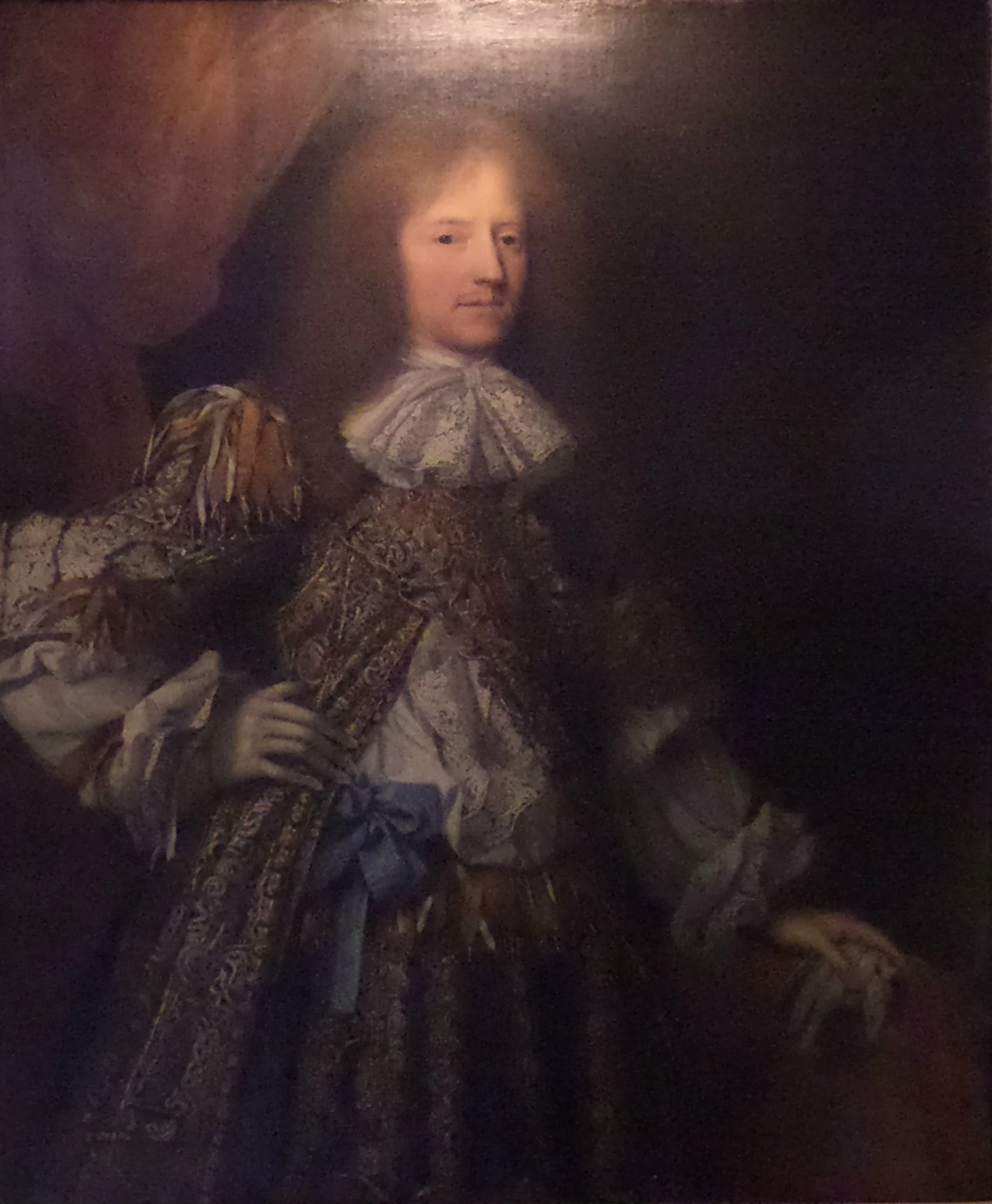
Her husband, John Granville, 1st Earl of Bath

She married the future earl in October 1652 at Kilkhampton. He received his earldom at the Restoration of the monarchy in 1660, making his wife a countess. The couple's children included:

- Charles Granville, 2nd Earl of Bath (1661–1701), eldest son and heir, who married twice: first, to Lady Martha Osborne (d. 1689), daughter of Thomas Osborne, 1st Duke of Leeds, and second, to Isabella van Nassau (1668-1692).
- Lady Jane Granville (c. 1653-1696), who married Sir William Leveson-Gower, 4th Baronet, and had children, including John Leveson-Gower, 1st Baron Gower.
- Lady Catherine Granville, who married Craven Peyton, MP for Boroughbridge, and had no children.
- Lady Grace Granville, suo jure 1st Countess Granville (1654–1744), who married George Carteret, 1st Baron Carteret of Haynes Park, Bedfordshire, and was later made a peer in her own right as Viscountess Carteret and Countess Granville.
- John Granville, 1st Baron Granville of Potheridge (1665–1707), who married Rebecca Child and had no children

The earl outlived his wife and died in 1701, but was followed within a fortnight by his son and heir, the 2nd Earl, who is thought to have committed suicide by shooting himself (possibly because the debts he had inherited exceeded his income) and was buried on the same day as his father. The title passed to Charles's only son, William, who died of smallpox, aged 19, in 1711.
