= William Harbord (politician) =

English politician and diplomat (1635–1692)

William Harbord (25 April 1635 – 31 July 1692), of Grafton Park, was an English diplomat and politician who sat in the House of Commons at various times between 1661 and 1690.

== Life ==
Harbord was the second son of Sir Charles Harbord (1596–1679) of Charing Cross, who had been Surveyor General to Charles I, and his second wife, Mary van Aelst, daughter of Jan van Aelst of Kent. He entered Parliament in 1661 as member for Dartmouth, and subsequently also represented Thetford and Launceston.

In 1672, Harbord became secretary to the Earl of Essex, the new Lord Lieutenant of Ireland. Essex praised him as "a very useful servant" and as a man of integrity who was also efficient in dispatching business. He lost the position on Essex's recall from Ireland in 1677.

In the parliamentary debates of 1676–8, Harbord spoke often against the alliance with France, and pressed for the removal of all papists from the King's person. He was notoriously intemperate in speech (he has been called one of the "angry men" of the Commons), and on one occasion he was warned not to disparage Charles II. Thereafter he took care to exclude the King from his attacks on the Government: "the King is the best man living, and the furthest from Popery". However he frequently attacked the future James II: embittered by the death of his brother Charles at the Battle of Sole Bay in 1672, he made the absurd claim that James, as Lord Admiral, had betrayed the English fleet, and was forced to withdraw the allegation.

He was a firm believer in the reality of the Popish Plot, and in concert with Ralph Montagu, whom he helped to get into Parliament, took an important part in the attack on the Earl of Danby. The revelation of Danby's secret dealings with France elated him to the point of hysteria: one historian has described his Commons speech on the subject ("poisoning and stabbing are in use....I am afraid that the King will be murdered") as "ravings".

His fear of assassination by the alleged plotters seems to have been genuine, and he briefly considered quitting England. In the parliament of 1679, in which he represented Thetford, he spoke against Danby's pardon, attacked John Maitland, 1st Duke of Lauderdale, and was eager for the disbanding of the army. He was returned for the Oxford Parliament of 1681, and was expected to play a crucial role, but the King dissolved it after only a week.

Leaving England on the accession of James II, Harbord served as a volunteer in the Imperial Army at Siege of Buda in 1686. He accompanied William of Orange on his invasion of England in 1688, and the following year was made a Privy Counsellor, to the dismay of the Tory party, and Paymaster of the Forces in Ireland. He returned to the Commons as member for Launceston. By now he has been described as an angry, embittered veteran, whose eloquence might win a debate, but rarely prevailed on an actual vote. In one of his frequent lapses of political judgment, he moved that two of James II's judges be hanged for treason, a proposal which was crushingly rejected.

Harbord was made Vice-Treasurer of Ireland in 1690. After a considerable delay he went to Ireland but returned without leave within a few months, pleading ill-health, having achieved nothing, according to his enemies, but in making a considerable profit at the Army's expense from his office as Paymaster General of the Irish Forces, and leaving the troops wholly out of pay. He was nominated by the King as Ambassador to Constantinople on 2 November 1691, although William had taken a very poor view of his conduct in Ireland ("in another country he would have been hanged" the King said severely). He left England on 9 November, arriving in Vienna on 8 March 1692 to mediate between Sultan Ahmed II and the Emperor Leopold I, but died in Belgrade of a malignant fever, before reaching his posting in Constantinople, on 31 July 1692.

== Family ==
Harbord married twice. By his first wife, Mary Duck, daughter of Arthur Duck and Mary Southworth, whom he married in 1661, he had three daughters,

- Mary Harbord (d.1715), who married Sir Edward Ayscough (1650–1699),
- Margaret Harbord, who married Robert King, 2nd Baron Kingston,
- Grace Harbord, who married Thomas Hatcher;

and by his second, Catherine Russell, daughter of Edward Russell and Penelope Hill (and niece of the 1st Duke of Bedford), he had one daughter,

- Letitia Harbord (d. 1722), who married Sir Rowland Winn, 3rd Baronet, of Nostell.

Parliament of England
Preceded by John Frederick; John Hale	Member of Parliament for Dartmouth; 1661–1679; With: Thomas Southcote 1661–1664; Thomas Kendall 1664–1667; Sir Walter Yonge, Bt 1667–1670; William Gould 1670–1673; Josiah Child 1673–1679	Succeeded by Sir Nathaniel Herne; John Upton
Preceded by Sir Allen Apsley; Sir Joseph Williamson	Member of Parliament for Thetford; 1679–1681; With: Sir Joseph Williamson	Succeeded by Henry Heveningham; William de Grey
Preceded by Sir Hugh Piper; Lord Lansdowne	Member of Parliament for Launceston; 1681–1685; With: Sir Hugh Piper	Succeeded by Sir Hugh Piper; John Granville
Preceded by Henry Heveningham; William de Grey	Member of Parliament for Thetford; Jan–June 1689; With: Sir Henry Hobart, Bt 1689; Sir Francis Guybon 1689	Succeeded by Sir Francis Guybon; John Trenchard
Preceded by John Granville; Sir Hugh Piper	Member of Parliament for Launceston; June 1689–1692; With: Edward Russell 1689–1690; Bernard Granville 1690–1692	Succeeded by Lord Hyde; Bernard Granville
Preceded by Sir Francis Guybon; John Trenchard	Member of Parliament for Thetford; Feb–May 1690; With: Sir Francis Guybon	Succeeded by Sir Francis Guybon; Baptist May
Political offices
Preceded by Henry Ford	Chief Secretary for Ireland; 1673–1676	Succeeded by Sir Cyril Wyche
