= Charles Harbord (1596–1679) =

English official, lawyer and politician (1596–1679)

Sir Charles Harbord
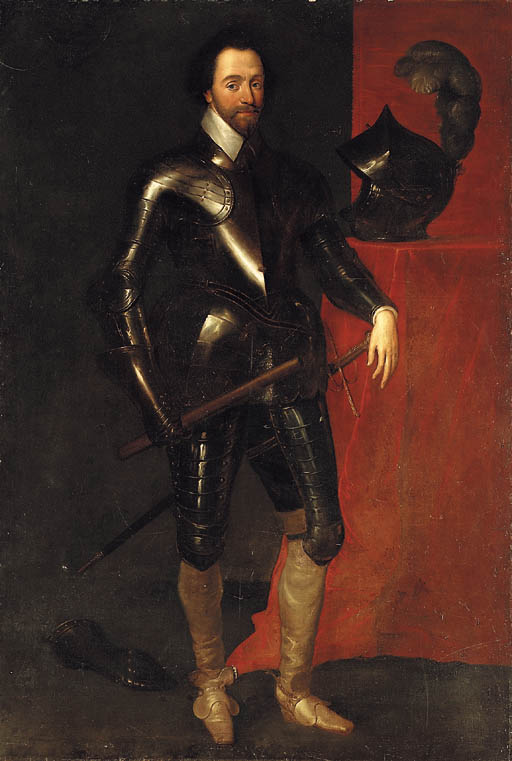
- A portrait of Sir Charles Harbord in Greenwich armour

Surveyor General of the Land Revenues of the Crown
- In office 1631–1642
- Monarch: Charles I
- In office 1660–1679
- Monarch: Charles II
- Succeeded by: William Harbord

Personal details
- Born: 1596
- Died: 25 May 1679 (aged 82–83)
- Parent(s): William Harbord; Dorothy Richmond

Sir Charles Harbord (1596 – 25 May 1679) was an English official, lawyer and politician who became one of the most active members of the House of Commons of England during the Cavalier Parliament. He was responsible for the management of crown lands during the reigns of both Charles I and Charles II as Surveyor General of the Land Revenues of the Crown.

== Early career ==
Harbord was the eldest son of William Harbord of Midsomer Norton and Dorothy Richmond. He was educated in law at Staple Inn and the Middle Temple. Initially finding employment as a solicitor, he entered the service of Philip Herbert, 4th Earl of Pembroke and sometime after, in 1631, was appointed Surveyor General of the Land Revenues of the Crown by Charles I. He undertook several other official duties on behalf of the crown including as commissioner for the inquiry into customs frauds (1632), commissioner for the inquiry into prohibited exports (1635), and auditor general to the Prince of Wales between 1636 and 1642. Between 1638 and 1642 he was a member of Queen Henrietta Maria's council. Between 1636 and 1642 he was a justice of the peace for Hertfordshire and Middlesex. He was knighted by the King at Hampton Court Palace on 29 May 1636.

He was a petitioner in the impeachment of Thomas Wentworth, 1st Earl of Strafford of 1641. Nonetheless, he was closely associated with the Royalist faction and on 28 October 1642, shortly after the outbreak of the First English Civil War, he obtained a pass to leave England for Holland with his family, servants and goods. He remained in Holland until 1652 and the outbreak of the First Anglo-Dutch War, when he returned to England. He acquired the manor at Stanninghall from the recusant Waldegrave family under The Protectorate.

== After the Restoration ==
At the Stuart Restoration in 1660, Harbord was returned to his office as Surveyor General and appointed a justice of the peace for Norfolk. In his role as Surveyor General, he was responsible for overseeing the reclamation of Crown lands which had been disposed of by the state during the British Interregnum. In most cases where crown lands had been sold off to private individuals, Harbord allowed the new occupiers to continue as tenants of the king with generous leases. He ordered an end to the vandalising of properties in the possession of former Roundheads, which had become widespread after the Restoration. However, the surveyors under Harbord often overestimated the resources (such as the amount of timber or deer) that had previously existed on an estate, and misleadingly portrayed the former good condition of manor houses, lodges, and other buildings.

=== Member of Parliament ===
At the 1661 English general election Harbord was returned as the Member of Parliament for Launceston and aligned with the faction of Edward Hyde. In the Commons, Harbord was one of the most active members of the Parliament; he was appointed to 694 committees and delivered 65 reports, 15 of them from grand committee. He acted as teller in five divisions and as messenger from the Commons on 12 occasions, and made 123 recorded speeches. He served as chairman of the revenue committee, from which he presented 12 reports. In 1662 he was appointed to the council of Catherine of Braganza.

In 1664, Harbord was listed as a member of the court faction and he was named to the committee to consider the Conventicle Act 1664. His extensive parliamentary activities also included opposition to a bill to prohibit the import of Irish cattle and supporting an inquiry into the Great Fire of London so vigorously that he was the first MP named to the committee. He was also among the members appointed to receive information about the "insolence of Popish priests".

Despite his earlier politics, Harbord welcomed the dismissal of the Earl of Clarendon in 1667 after the disastrous Second Anglo-Dutch War. When parliament met during the Third Anglo-Dutch War, Harbord welcomed the proposal for a naturalization bill, only regretting that it would be restricted to Protestants. He opposed the Declaration of Indulgence (1672) on the basis that statute law should be made only by Parliament, but he was conciliatory towards nonconformists. Harbord was a member of a committee opposing the marriage of James, Duke of York to Mary of Modena in 1673. In parliamentary debates over the Cabal ministry in 1674, Harbord spoke in opposition to the political activity of George Villiers, 2nd Duke of Buckingham.

By 1677, Harbord was recorded on the lists of Anthony Ashley-Cooper, 3rd Earl of Shaftesbury as "doubly vile" owing to his support for the succession of the Duke of the York. In 1678 Harbord was reckoned as being a government speaker and a court supporter. Having become rich through his various crown offices, he was accused by Henry Goring of benefiting from the sale of crown lands. Harbord replied that he had actually saved the crown considerable sums of money:

"The King has granted me four manors of £400 p.a. each, not a farthing profit to me as long as the queen lives. As I have saved the crown £80,000 at a time, I desired only a mark of my service, and that is all."

Although he declared that "I have always been for the Church of England, and I will die in it", he supported a bill from the Lords to relax the Test Act 1673. He served on the committee of inquiry into the Popish Plot. He helped to consider the bill to hinder Roman Catholics from sitting in Parliament, but warmly supported the Lords amendment to except the Duke of York. By this stage, Harbord was widely respected in the Commons for his knowledge of parliamentary procedure, and towards the end of the Cavalier Parliament he was included in the committee to devise means of surmounting the royal veto on the 1678 militia bill.

In 1679, he was elected to the Habeas Corpus Parliament where he continued to be recorded as "vile" on Shaftesbury's list. Harbord was named to six committees and made two recorded speeches. On 22 March 1679 he openly criticised the pardon given to Lord Danby by Charles II, stating:

"Did the King ever pardon anyone after an impeachment was against them? This way of pardoning, an impeachment depending, is one of the most dangerous consequence in the world, both to King and people."

He was absent from the Commons during the vote on the Exclusion Bill on 15 May and died shortly afterwards, on 25 May 1679.

Despite his role in parliamentary affairs as an indefatigable legislator, Harbord was a controversial figure in his own lifetime owing to the large amounts of money he made through his official roles. He was described by the contemporary historian, Gilbert Burnet, as "very rich and very covetous". His reputation was handled very severely in a 1677 pamphlet entitled 'A List of the principal Labourers in the great Design of Popery and Arbitrary Government'.

== Personal life ==
Harbord married twice. He had married his first wife, Anne Tyen, by 1623. After her death, he married Mary van Aelst (1602–1664) in 1626, with whom he had six sons and three daughters. He was succeeded in his office as Surveyor General by his second son, William Harbord (1635–1692). One of his other sons, also called Sir Charles Harbord, died on 28 May 1672 while serving on HMS Royal James during the Battle of Solebay and has a memorial to his memory in Westminster Abbey. Harbord's eldest and only surviving son, John, died without issue in 1710. Through John's sister, Catherine, Charles Harbord was the grandfather of Harbord Harbord and an ancestor of Harbord Harbord, 1st Baron Suffield.

Parliament of England
Preceded by John Cloberry; Thomas Gewen	Member of Parliament for Launceston with Richard Edgcumbe (1661–1679); Bernard Granville (1679); 1661–1679	Succeeded by Sir John Coryton, Bt; Sir Hugh Piper
