= Surveyor General of the Land Revenues of the Crown =

Office of the British crown

The post of Surveyor General of the Land Revenues of the Crown was an office under the English (later the United Kingdom) Crown, charged with the management of Crown lands. In 1810, by the Crown Lands Act 1810 (50 Geo. 3. c. 65), later amended by the Crown Lands Act 1829 (10 Geo. 4. c. 50), the functions of the post were merged with those of the Surveyor General of Woods, Forests, Parks, and Chases and became the responsibility of a new body, the Commissioners of Woods, Forests and Land Revenues.

== Surveyors General of the Land Revenues of the Crown ==
- 1631 Sir Charles Harbord
- 1642–1660 Position vacant during the English Civil War and Interregnum
- 1660 Sir Charles Harbord
- 1679 William Harbord
- 1692 William Tailer
- 1693 Samuel Travers
- 1710 John Manley
- 1714 Alexander Pendarves
- 1715 Hugh Cholmeley
- 1722 John Pulteney
- 1726 Phillips Gybbon
- 1730 Exton Sayer
- 1732 Thomas Walker
- 1750 John Monckton, 1st Viscount Galway
- 1751 Hon. Robert Sawyer Herbert
- 1769 Peter Burrell
- 1775 John St John
- 1784 George Augustus Selwyn
- 1794 John Fordyce
- 1809 James Pillar (acting)
