= John Williams (died 1751) =

John Williams (died 1 January 1751) was a member of parliament for Fowey within Cornwall, England, in January 1701 and December 1701.

He was the eldest son of William Williams of Bodenick and Treworgy.

He was appointed High Sheriff of Cornwall for 1703–04.

He never married.

Parliament of England
Preceded by Thomas Vivian	MP for Fowey; 1701	Succeeded by George Granville, 1st Baron Lansdowne
