= Baron Granville =

Extinct barony in the Peerage of England

Baron Granville was a title that was created twice in the Peerage of England. The first creation came on 20 April 1661 when John Granville, 1st Earl of Bath was made Baron Granville of Kilkhampton and Biddeford. He was made Viscount Granville and Earl of Bath at the same time. See the latter title for more information on this creation. The second creation came on 13 March 1703 when the Honourable John Granville was made Baron Granville of Potheridge. He was a younger son of the first Earl of Bath. The title became extinct upon his death in 1707.

== Baron Granville; First creation (1661) ==
- see Earl of Bath

== Baron Granville; Second creation (1703) ==
- John Granville, 1st Baron Granville (1665–1707)

== See also ==
- Earl of Bath
- Earl Granville
