= Charles Granville, 2nd Earl of Bath =

English diplomat

Charles Granville, 2nd Earl of Bath (bapt. 31 August 1661 – 4 September 1701) was an English soldier, politician, diplomat, courtier and peer.

== Biography ==
Born with the courtesy title of Lord Lansdown in 1661, he was the eldest son of John Granville, 1st Earl of Bath and his wife, the former Jane Wyche.

On 19 November 1680, Granville was elected as Member of Parliament for Launceston following the by-election caused by the death of Sir John Coryton, Bt. but was defeated by William Harbord in the following general election of February 1681. In 1683, he fought in the Battle of Vienna on the Habsburg side and was created a Count of the Holy Roman Empire for his services, on 27 January 1684.

Granville returned to Parliament after being elected MP for Cornwall in 1685 and was also appointed ambassador to Spain that year. After his defeat to Hugh Boscawen and Sir John Carew, 3rd Baronet, he was called to the House of Lords in his father's barony of Granville in 1689, appointed Joint Lord Lieutenant of Devon and Cornwall alongside his father in 1691 and a Lord of the Bedchamber in 1692.

Granville inherited his father's earldom of Bath on 22 August 1701. On 4 September 1701, he was found dead in a chair in his bedroom, wounded in the head, with two pistols, one of which had been fired. It was noted that he had been melancholy. On 22 September, both father and son were buried at Kilkhampton.

== Personal life ==
On 22 May 1678, aged seventeen, Granville married Lady Martha Osborne, a daughter of Thomas Osborne, 1st Duke of Leeds, who was herself about fourteen. His first wife died on 11 September 1689 and was buried in Westminster Abbey as 'the Lady Lansdown'.

10 May 1691 (New Style), he married Isabella, the sister of Henry de Nassau d'Auverquerque, 1st Earl of Grantham. They had one son, William Henry (1691–1711), to whom Bath's peerages and estates passed on his death. The third Earl died unmarried at the age of 19, and the earldom became extinct.

Parliament of England
Preceded by Sir Hugh Piper; Sir John Coryton, Bt	Member of Parliament for Launceston with Sir Hugh Piper; 1680–1681	Succeeded by Sir Hugh Piper; William Harbord
Preceded by Francis Robartes; Sir Richard Edgcumbe	Member of Parliament for Cornwall with Viscount Bodmin 1685; Francis Robartes 1685–1686; 1685–1686	Succeeded by Sir John Carew, Bt; Hugh Boscawen
Honorary titles
Preceded by The Earl of Bath	Lord Lieutenant of Cornwall and Devon with The Earl of Bath; 1691–1693	Succeeded by The Earl of Bath
Peerage of England
Preceded by John Granville	Earl of Bath; 1701	Succeeded by William Granville
Preceded by John Granville	Baron Granville (writ of acceleration); 1689–1701	Succeeded by William Granville
