= James Buller (the elder) =

English Tory politician (1678–1710)

James Buller (1678 – 14 September 1710) was an English Tory politician.

He was baptised on 8 January 1678, he was the second son of Francis Buller and the brother of Francis Buller. He was educated at New College, Oxford and graduated in 1695. In 1695, he entered the Middle Temple. He never married.

In January 1699, Buller was returned at a by-election at Saltash. He was re-elected for the borough in January 1701. He transferred to the shire seat of Cornwall in December 1701. At the general election of 1702, he and John Granville were chosen unopposed as knights of the shire. In March 1704, he was listed among the supporters of Lord Nottingham over the Scotch Plot. In 1705, he was defeated in the county election but was able to secure his return for Saltash instead. In the 1708 general election, he was returned for the county of Cornwall.

In the summer of 1709, Buller was admitted as a member of the Board of Brothers. He voted against the impeachement of Dr Henry Sacheverell.
