= Charles Carney (Jacobite) =

Irish soldier

Sir Charles Carney was an Irish professional soldier, who later in his career became a Jacobite. He served as an officer in the Irish Army of James II during the Williamite War in Ireland.

== Career ==
Carney was an officer in the army of Charles II, during which time he served on the Continent. In 1685 he raised a company in the Earl of Bath's Regiment and was later promoted to the lieutenant-colonelcy. At the outbreak of the Revolution of 1688 Carney stayed loyal to James II and was rewarded with the regiment's colonelcy, and subsequently followed James when the latter was deposed by William of Orange.

In 1689 the Catholic Carney was appointed Governor of newly captured Coleraine. Following the failed Siege of Derry, Jacobite forces began evacuating north-western Ulster as the reinforced Protestant forces advanced. When he received intelligence of the approach of General Percy Kirke and some Enniskillen troops, both of whom had acquired a ferocious reputation, Carney abandoned Coleraine and headed southwards to Jacobite-held Charlemont. His position might have become increasingly dangerous had he remained as Marshal Schomberg's expeditionary force landed and captured Carrickfergus and other settlements along the County Antrim coastline.

During the Battle of the Boyne the following year, Carney commanded the Jacobite reserve.

Following the Jacobite defeat, Carney may have joined the Irish Brigade in French service: along with a number of other Irish officers he was reported killed at the Battle of Marsaglia in 1693.

== Bibliography ==
- Cannon, R. Historical Record of the Tenth, Or the North Lincolnshire, Regiment of Foot. Parker, Furnivall and Parker, 1847.
- Childs, John. The Williamite Wars in Ireland. Bloomsbury Publishing, 2007.
- McNally, Michael. Battle of the Boyne 1690: The Irish Campaign for the English Crown. Osprey Publishing, 2005.
