= William Granville, 3rd Earl of Bath =

English nobleman

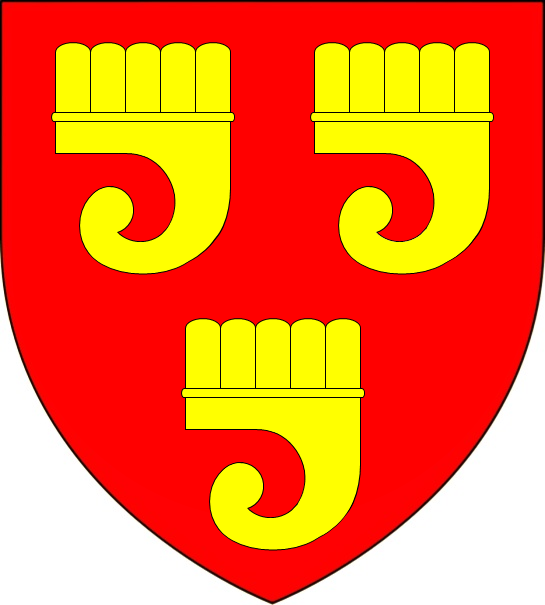
Arms of Granville, Earls of Bath: Gules, three clarions or

William Henry Granville, 3rd Earl of Bath (30 January 1692 – 17 May 1711) was an English nobleman.

== Origins ==
He was the only son of Charles Granville, 2nd Earl of Bath, by his second wife Isabella de Nassau d'Auverquerque, sister of Henry de Nassau d'Auverquerque, 1st Earl of Grantham.

== Career ==
He was styled Viscount Lansdown from August to September 1701, when he succeeded in the earldom after his father committed suicide, allegedly because of the debts he had inherited.

== Death ==
Lord Bath died of smallpox in May 1711, aged 19, when the earldom became extinct.

Peerage of England
Preceded by Charles Granville	Earl of Bath; 1701–1711	Extinct
