= Shotover (disambiguation) =

Shotover is a hill and forest in South Oxfordshire. It may also refer to:

- Shotover Park, country house and estate in Oxfordshire
- Forest Hill with Shotover, civil parish in Oxfordshire
- Shotover Country, suburb of Queenstown, New Zealand
- Shotover River, river in Otago, New Zealand
- Shotover Brewery, brewery in Oxford, England
- Shotover (horse) (1879–1898), British thoroughbred racehorse and broodmare
- Captain Shotover, character in George Bernard Shaw's play Heartbreak House
