= Bernard Granville (MP died 1701) =

English politician

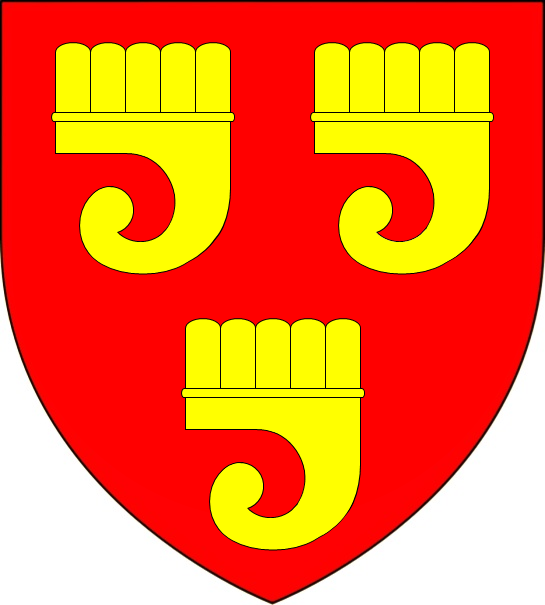
Arms of Granville: Gules, three clarions or

Bernard Granville (4 March 1631 – 14 June 1701) of Birdcage Walk, Westminster, and Apps Court, Walton-on-Thames, Surrey, of a Westcountry family, was a courtier of King Charles II who served as a Member of Parliament for several Cornish constituencies.

== Origins ==
He was born the 4th son of Sir Bevil Grenville (1596–1643) of Stowe, Kilkhampton in Cornwall, and lord of the manor of Bideford in Devon, a Royalist soldier and MP for Cornwall who died in heroic circumstances at the Battle of Lansdowne (1643). His elder brother was John Granville, 1st Earl of Bath, who played an important role in effecting the Restoration of the Monarchy to King Charles II in 1660, and whose descendants died out in the male line on the death of the 3rd Earl in 1711. The 1st Earl of Bath, having become interested in his family's history and examined his supposed descent from Sir Richard de Grenville (died after 1142) (alias de Grainvilla, de Greinvill, etc.) one of the Twelve Knights of Glamorgan who served under Robert FitzHamon (died 1107), in the conquest of Glamorgan in Wales, changed the spelling of the family name to "Granville" from "Grenville" apparently to conform with the spelling of the Norman manor at which his family originated at the time of the Norman Conquest.

== Career ==
He was educated at Angers Academy and became a courtier, holding various public offices.

== Serves the king in exile ==
He rendered useful service to King Charles II and his family during his exile in France during the Commonwealth, and served as Gentleman of the Bedchamber to Henry Stuart, Duke of Gloucester (1640-1660) (the King's youngest brother), during his exile.

The Restoration of the Monarchy was effected in 1660 by his elder brother the 1st Earl of Bath, the principal directing role being played by their first cousin George Monck, 1st Duke of Albemarle. It was to Bernard Granville that the Duke entrusted the last vital task in the process, of carrying a despatch to the King in exile informing him that all was ready for his reception in England.

== Royal courtier ==
After the Restoration he served in several prominent roles as a courtier of King Charles II, namely Gentleman of the Horse and Groom of the Bedchamber from 1672 to 1688. He also obtained several lucrative royal offices, including: Underkeeper of St James's Park, a royal park adjoining St James's Palace in Westminster, for life from 1660; joint surveyor and receiver of green wax fines (1678–79); Master of the Swans (1683–1692) and comptroller-general of wine licences (1685–1690).

== Political career ==
He was elected an MP for Liskeard in 1661, after which he was returned almost continuously as MP for a series of Cornish constituencies (Launceston, 1679, Saltash, 1681, Plymouth, 1685, Saltash, 1689, Launceston, 1690 and Lostwithiel, 1695). In 1675 he was appointed envoy extraordinary to Florence, Genoa and Savoy. He had a London house in Birdcage Walk, Westminster (looking onto St James's Park) and purchased an estate at Apps Court in Surrey.

== Marriage and children ==
He married Anne Morley (died 20 September 1701), only daughter and heiress of The Hon. Col. Cuthbert/Cutbert Morley (buried in St Mary's Church, Lambeth, 30 June 1669) of Hawnby/Hornby, Yorkshire, which brought him several Yorkshire properties. Her mother was Catherine Leke, a daughter of Francis Leke, 1st Earl of Scarsdale (1581–1655), a Royalist during the Civil War. By his wife he had three sons and two daughters as follows:

- Sir Bevil Granville (d.1706), eldest son and heir, a soldier who served as Governor of Pendennis Castle in Cornwall and as Governor of Barbados. He was a Member of Parliament for Fowey, Cornwall, in 1685. Died childless.
- George Granville, 1st Baron Lansdowne (d.1734), 2nd son, elevated to the Peerage in 1711 as "Baron Lansdowne of Bideford", named after the Battle of Lansdowne at which his grandfather had met a heroic death and after his father's Devonshire seat which the family had held since Norman times. He served as Secretary at War and Comptroller and Treasurer of the Household to Queen Anne. Died without children, when his title became extinct.
- Col. Bernard Granville (c.1670-1723), 3rd son, of Buckland, Gloucestershire, Lieutenant-Governor of Hull, an MP for Camelford and Fowey in Cornwall. He married Mary Westcombe (d.1747) (buried in Gloucester Cathedral), a daughter of Sir Martin Westcombe, 1st Baronet, Consul at Cadiz. His daughter was Mary Delany (1700-1788), an artist, letter-writer, and bluestocking, known for her "paper-mosaicks" and botanic drawing, needlework and her lively correspondence. His eldest son was Bernard Granville (d.1775) of Calwich Abbey, Staffordshire, which he purchased from the Fleetwood family, who died unmarried in 1775, being the last surviving male of the ancient Granville family. He bequeathed his estates to his nephew Rev. John D'Ewes (1774-1826), who in 1786 in accordance with the terms of the bequest, assumed the surname and arms of Granville in lieu of his patronymic. However he too died without surviving children, leaving as his heir his nephew Court D'Ewes (1779-1848) of Chadley, Wellesbourne, Warwickshire, his brother's son. Court also assumed the surname and arms of Granville. His children, the family of "Granville of Wellesbourne" continued at that seat until after 1937.
- Anne Granville (d.1730), wife of Sir John Stanley, 1st Baronet (d.1744) of Grangegorman, childless.
- Elizabeth Granville, a maid of honour who died unmarried.

== Death and burial ==
Granville died on 14 June 1701, aged 71 and was buried on 22 June 1701 in St Mary's Church, Lambeth, Surrey, next to Lambeth Palace, the London residence of the Archbishop of Canterbury. He was buried in the same grave as his father-in-law who died in 1699 and his wife, who died on 20 September 1701. His monument is described in Thomas Allen's 1827 work History and Antiquities of the Parish of Lambeth, 1827 as "a beautiful monument of white marble ornamented with cherubs, fruit, flowers, etc.", situated on the "north side of the stairs leading to the north gallery". In 1872 it was described as "out of sight and partially dismantled". No mention was made of it in the 1951 work Survey of London: Church of St Mary, Lambeth.
