= Forest Hill, Oxfordshire =

Village in Oxfordshire, England

Coordinates: 51.767°N 1.152°W

Forest Hill
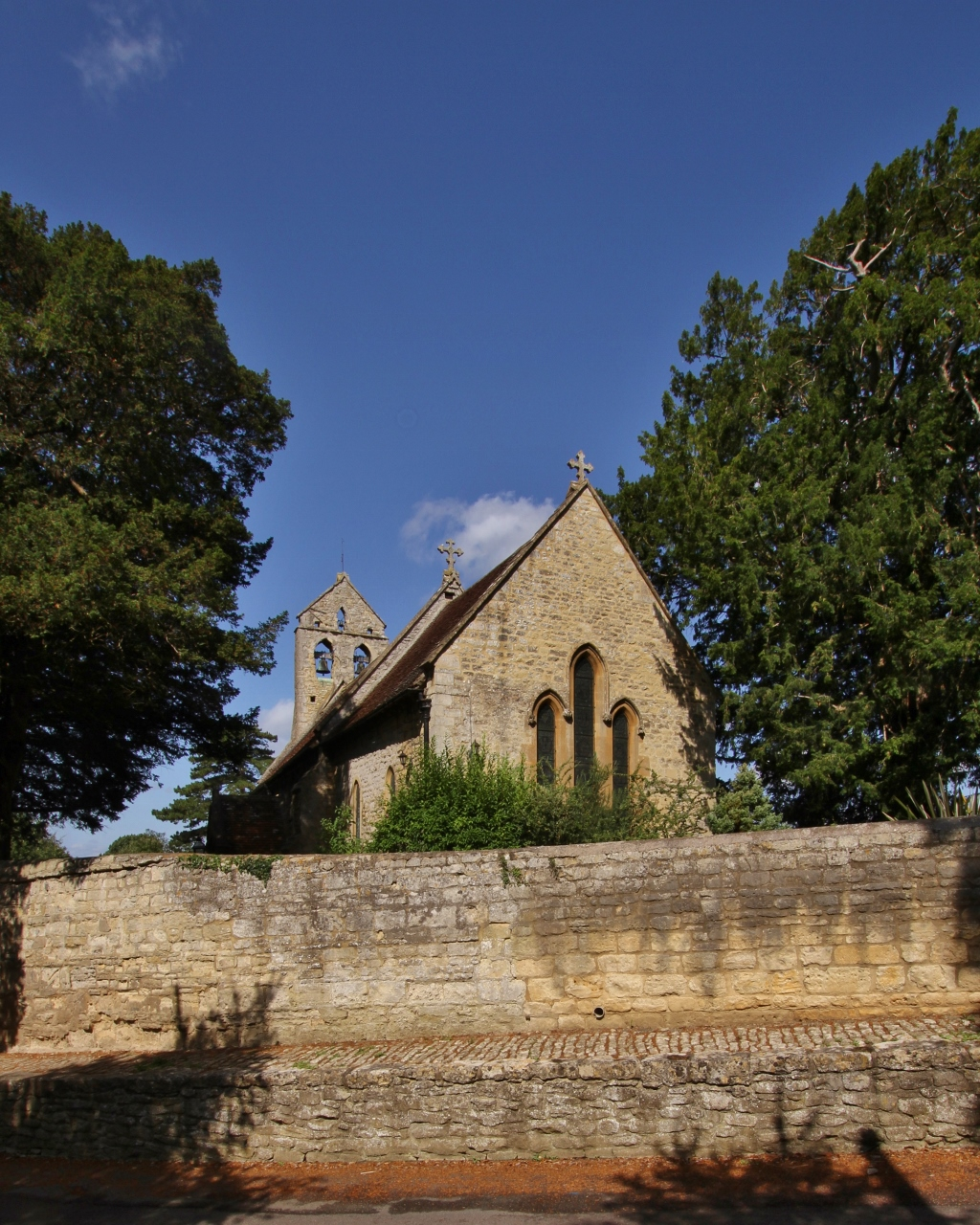
- Parish church of St Nicholas

- Location within Oxfordshire
- Population: 557 (parish, including Shotover) (2021 census)
- OS grid reference: SP5807
- Civil parish: Forest Hill with Shotover
- District: South Oxfordshire
- Shire county: Oxfordshire
- Region: South East
- Country: England
- Sovereign state: United Kingdom
- Post town: Oxford
- Postcode district: OX33
- Dialling code: 01865
- Police: Thames Valley
- Fire: Oxfordshire
- Ambulance: South Central
- UK Parliament: Henley
- Website: Forest Hill Parish Council

Forest Hill is a village in the civil parish of Forest Hill with Shotover, in the South Oxfordshire district, in Oxfordshire, England, about 4.5 miles (7 km) east of Oxford. The village which is about 330 feet (100 m) above sea level is on the northeastern brow of a ridge of hills. The highest point of the ridge is Red Hill, which rises to 440 feet (130 m) just south of the village. The 2011 census recorded Forest Hill with Shotover's population as 856.

== Manor ==
The toponym is derived from the Old English forst-hyll meaning "hill ridge". It has no etymological connection with forests. The Domesday Book records that in 1086 William the Conqueror's half-brother Odo, Bishop of Bayeux held Forest Hill. He had two manors, of which Roger d'Ivry held the larger and Ilbert de Lacy held the smaller. The d'Ivry manor changed hands and was divided. By 1242–43 one part had been bestowed upon the Augustinian Chalcombe Priory in Northamptonshire. The other part was bestowed upon the Benedictine Studley Priory, Oxfordshire. Both priories retained their respective holdings until the dissolution of the monasteries in the 16th century.

Ilbert de Lacy also held the manor in the adjacent parish of Stanton St. John. In about 1100 de Lacy's son forfeited both manors, and his holding at Forest Hill passed to Robert D'Oyly. D'Oyly gave the tenancy to one Hugh de Tew, but after Osney Abbey was founded in 1129 de Tew gave the tenancy to the Abbey. In 1526 the de Lacy manor was granted to Cardinal Thomas Wolsey for his new college at Oxford, but in 1529 King Henry VIII stripped Wolsey of his office and all his property. After the dissolution of the monasteries each of the Forest Hill estates quickly passed through the hands of owners who may have bought and sold former monastic lands as speculative investments. Then Sir John Brome, lord of Holton, bought and reunited the estates: the two parts of the de Lacy estate in 1544 and the d'Ivry estate in 1545. The Forest Hill estate remained in the Brome family for four generations but fell into debt, was mortgaged twice in the 1620s and was finally sold in 1630. From 1621 the house had been let out, and the second mortgage was a loan of £500 from the tenant to the Bromes.

The age of the original manor house is unknown. It was garrisoned in the early years of the English Civil War by Royalist troops, later supplanted by Parliamentarian forces that occupied Forest Hill. In 1643 the poet John Milton stayed at the house, where he courted the daughter of the family, 16-year-old Mary Powell. The Scots poet William Julius Mickle (1735–88) lodged at the manor house 1771–75. Here he translated the Portuguese epic poem the Lusiad by Luís de Camões. In 1781 he married the daughter of the house, Mary Tomkins, and settled in Wheatley. Mickle and his wife are buried in St Nicholas' churchyard. Despite the manor house's rich history, in 1854 Lincoln College demolished it and re-used the stones to build a new house on the site. Lincoln College, Oxford bought the Forest Hill estate in 1807. It remained in the college's ownership until 1953.

== Churches ==
The Church of England parish church of Saint Nicholas the Confessor may have begun as a chapel, but by 1341 Forest Hill was a separate parish and St Nicholas' was being referred to as an ecclesia parochialis ("parish church"). It was given to Osney Abbey in about 1140. When the de Lacy manor was granted to Cardinal Wolsey in 1526, St Nicholas' church was included. Thereafter the advowson of the parish remained with whoever owned the manor. In 1807 Lincoln College, Oxford bought the estate, including the manor house and St Nicholas' church. St Nicholas' church building is Norman, and the 12th century chancel arch is probably original.

The church was rebuilt in the 13th century in the transitional style from Norman architecture to the Early English Gothic style: the lancet windows on both sides of the chancel and the gabled bellcote at the west end of the nave date from this rebuilding. Later the present west window was added in the Perpendicular Gothic style. In the same period a south porch was built. Its inner door is Perpendicular, but the outer is transitional between Norman and Early English and has been re-set, presumably from where the Perpendicular doorway is now. In 1639 buttresses were built against the west wall to support the bellcote. The bellcote has two bells, cast in 1652.

In 1847 the architect James Cranston restored the chancel. The Oxford architectural writer and publisher J.H. Parker designed the east window of three traceried lancets. In 1852 the Gothic Revival architect George Gilbert Scott restored the nave and added the organ chamber and north aisle, re-setting the original transitional style north doorway in the new wall. A Sanctus bell was cast and hung at the same time as the restoration. A Wesleyan congregation was established in Forest Hill in the 19th century. It originally had a wooden chapel, but in 1898 opened a new brick-built one.

== Economic history ==
The parish has had a watermill since the 13th century, when land was granted to Osney Abbey in 1221 and 1229 to build one on Bayswater Brook. The present Bayswater Mill at the west end of the parish, just north of Sandhills, is mainly 18th-century. Forest Hill was a separate civil parish until 1881, when it was merged with Shotover. In 1851 the parish had a population of 149.

== Amenities ==
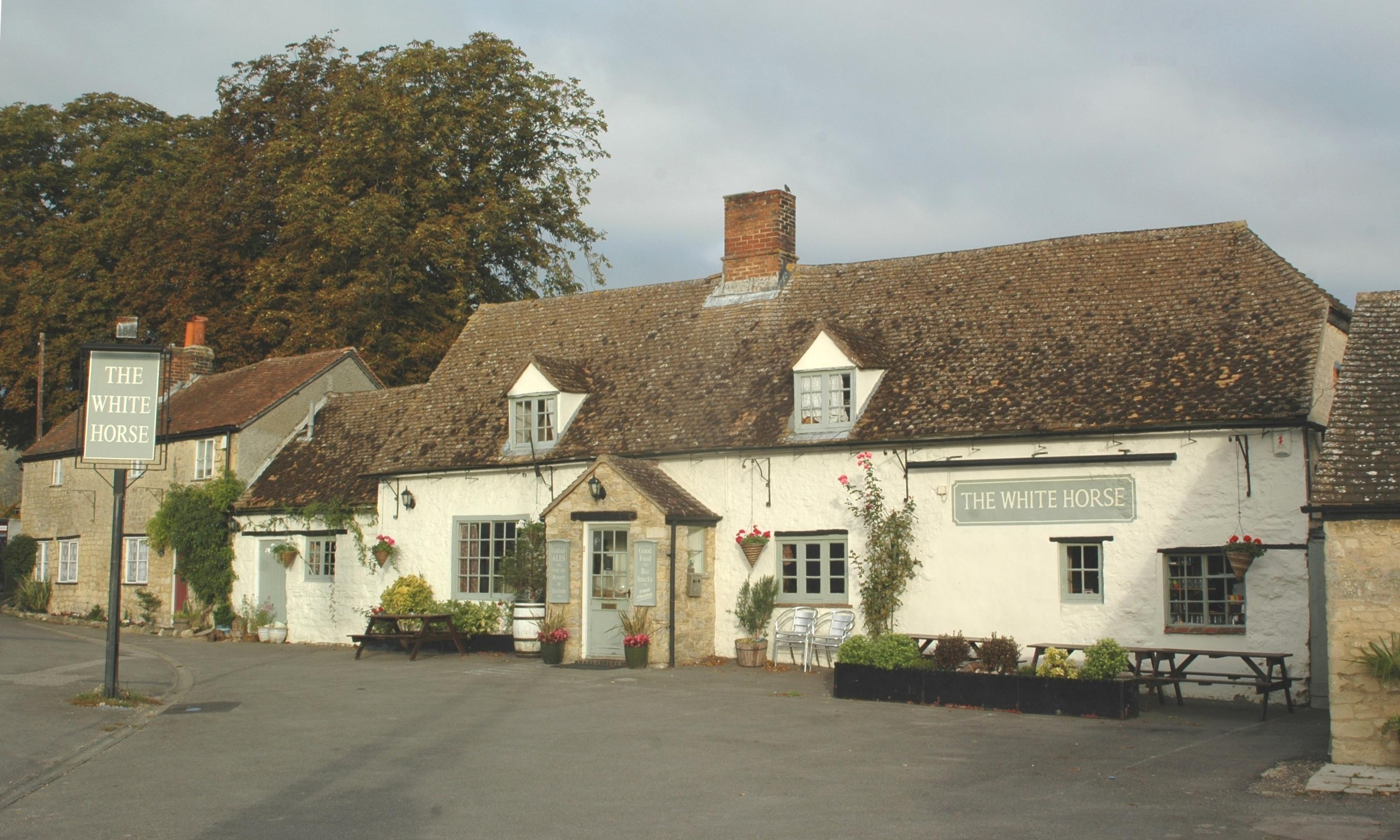
The White Horse public house

The village has a public house, the White Horse.

== Sources ==
- Lobel, Mary D, ed. (1957). A History of the County of Oxford. Victoria County History. Vol. 5: Bullingdon Hundred. London: Oxford University Press for the Institute of Historical Research. pp. 122–134.
- Sherwood, Jennifer; Pevsner, Nikolaus (1974). Oxfordshire. The Buildings of England. Harmondsworth: Penguin Books. pp. 605–606. ISBN 0-14-071045-0.
