= Archibald Christie =

Archibald Christie may refer to:

- Archie Christie (1889–1962), British businessman, military officer and first husband of mystery writer Agatha Christie
- Archibald Christie (British Army officer, born 1774) (1774–1847)
