= Martin Hunter (British Army officer) =

British Army general

General Sir Martin Hunter GCMG GCH
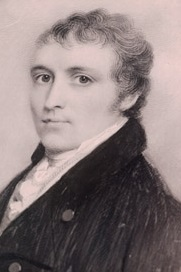
- Miniature portrait
- Born: 1757
- Died: 1846 (aged 88–89)

General Sir Martin Hunter GCMG GCH (1757–1846) was a British Army officer, and governor of Stirling Castle.

In 1797, he married Scottish heiress Jean Dickson (died 1845). They had a large family, including daughter Margaret Dysart Hunter who married Charles Samuel Grey, son of Sir George Grey, 1st Baronet Grey of Fallodon and nephew of Charles Grey, 2nd Earl Grey, Prime Minister of the United Kingdom who abolished slavery in the British Empire in 1833.

Hunter joined the army in 1771, as an ensign in the 52nd (Oxfordshire) Regiment of Foot, and was made lieutenant in 1775. He accompanied his regiment to America, where he saw action during the American Revolutionary War at Bunker Hill, Brooklyn, Brandywine, and Fort Washington. He was wounded during a night attack on General Wayne's brigade.

In 1777 Hunter was made captain in the 52nd. He served in India, commanding the corps who attacked the breach at Cannanore in 1785, and commanded the 52nd at various sieges during the campaign under Lord Cornwallis. He was wounded during the battle at Seringapatam in 1792. In 1793, Hunter obtained a majority in the 91st Foot, and in 1794, he was promoted to lieutenant colonel.

Hunter held a commissions in the 60th Foot, and also the 48th Foot, which he commanded in Gibraltar, Trinidad and Puerto Rico. In 1800 he became colonel, and in 1801, brigadier-general. Hunter was made lieutenant-general in 1812, and general in 1825. He served as Governor of Pendennis Castle in Cornwall from 1823 to 1832 and as Governor of Stirling Castle in Scotland from 1832 until his death.

Hunter died in 1846, the last survivor of Lexington and Concord.

== Notes ==
Military offices
New regiment	Colonel of the 104th Regiment of Foot (New Brunswick Regiment); 1803–1817	Disbanded
Preceded by Felix Buckley	Governor of Pendennis Castle; 1823–1832	Succeeded by Paul Anderson
Preceded by The Earl of Donoughmore	Governor of Stirling Castle; 1832–1846	Succeeded by abolished?
