= John Folliot (British Army officer, died 1748) =

British general

Lieutenant-General John Folliot (or Folliott; died 4 November 1748) was an officer of the British Army.

== Biography ==
Folliot joined the Army as an ensign in the Coldstream Regiment of Foot Guards on 20 March 1704, and served at the defence of Gibraltar during the winter of 1704–1705. He "received two dangerous wounds, and was eight months under the surgeon's hands". On his way home he was captured and held as a prisoner of war in France, where he was "barbarously used". After three months he was released on parole due to his injuries, but after fifteen months back in England still had not recovered, and his petition to Prince George of Denmark for the Queen's bounty was referred to the Secretary at War on 22 April 1706. Folliot was promoted to lieutenant in the Coldstream Guards on 24 June 1706, then served as first adjutant of the regiment from 25 March 1710 until he was made captain-lieutenant of the colonel's company, with rank as a lieutenant-colonel of Foot, on 12 November 1713. He served again as first adjutant between July 1715 and February 1721, being promoted to captain on 23 November 1716, second major on 8 July 1721 and first major on 3 August 1733. On 30 October 1734 he was made lieutenant-colonel of the regiment, then on 1 April 1743 lieutenant-colonel of the 1st Regiment of Foot Guards. He commanded the 1st Foot Guards in several campaigns of the War of the Austrian Succession, and during the Jacobite Rising of 1745 was placed in command of the military in London.

Besides his regimental service, Folliott was appointed Lieutenant-Governor of Pendennis Castle on 19 June 1729, and Governor of Carlisle on 9 July 1739. He was promoted to brigadier-general on 2 July 1739, major-general on 13 August 1741 and lieutenant-general on 1 June 1745. He had purchased the estate of Leith Hill Place, at Ockley in Surrey, from John Worsfold, and by 1728 was a justice of the peace resident at Ockley. His only child Susanna predeceased him in 1743, and his heir, also John Folliott, sold Leith Hill Place to Richard Hull in 1760.

Military offices
Preceded by The Earl of Carlisle	Governor of Carlisle; 1739–1748	Succeeded by Charles Howard
