= Governor of Pendennis Castle =

The Governor of Pendennis Castle was a military officer who commanded the fortifications at Pendennis Castle, part of the defences of the River Fal and Carrick Roads, on the south coast of Cornwall near Falmouth. Originally fortified under Henry VIII, defences in the area were intermittently maintained until after the Second World War. The office of governor was abolished in 1837, when Gen. Anderson received the colonelcy of the 78th Regiment of Foot.

== Governors of Pendennis Castle ==
The early Governorship was a quasi-hereditary office, whose holders were as follows:

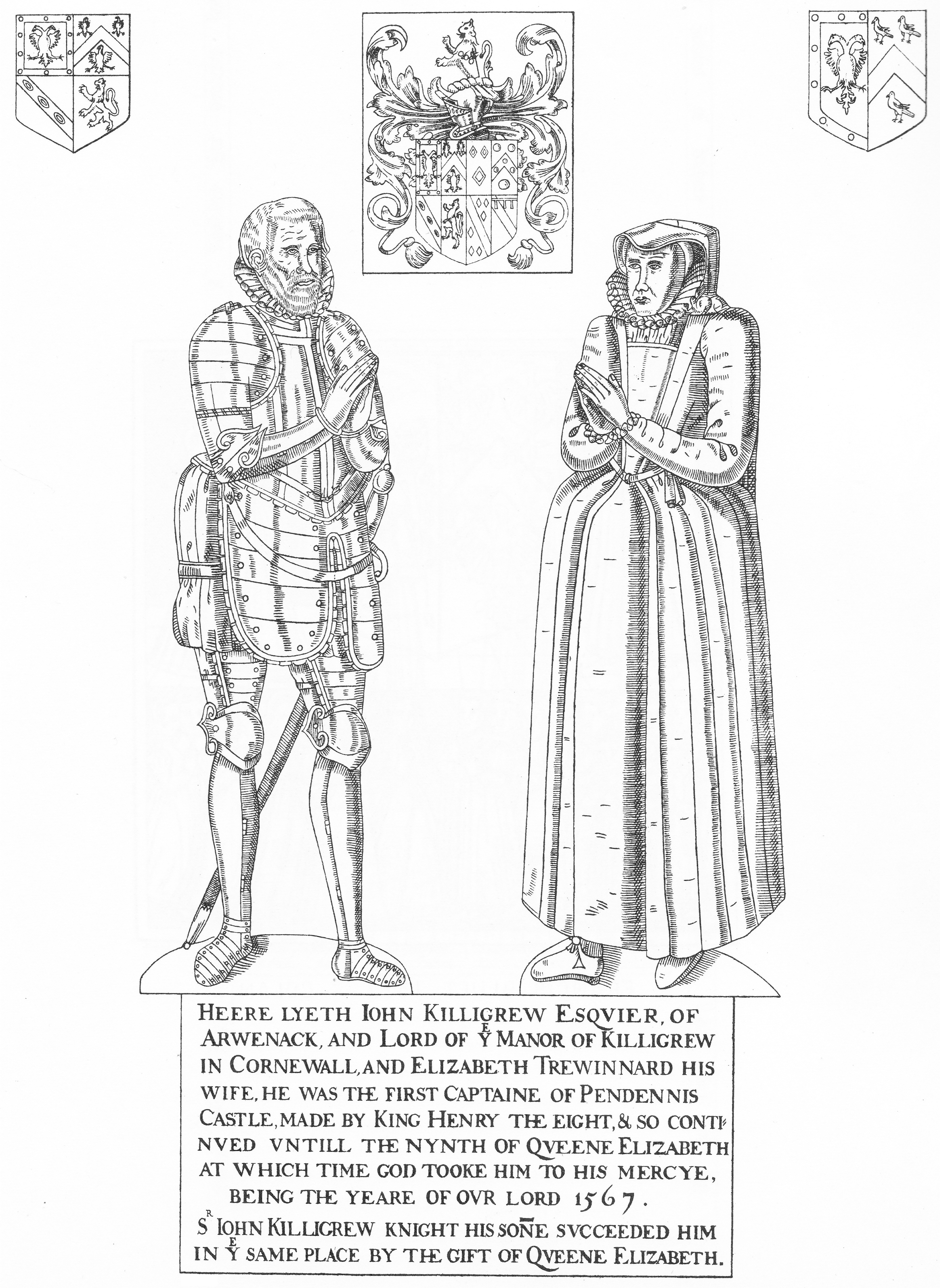
Monumental brass of John III Killigrew (d.1567) of Arwenack, Falmouth, first Governor of Pendennis Castle. St Budock's Church, Budock Water, near Falmouth

- John III Killigrew (d.1567) of Arwenack, Falmouth, first Governor, appointed by King Henry VIII. His monumental brass survives in St Budock's Church, Budock Water, near Falmouth, inscribed as follows:

"Heere lyeth John Killigrew, Esquier, of Arwenack and lord of ye manor of Killigrew in Cornewall, and Elizabeth Trewinnard his wife. He was the first Captaine of Pendennis Castle, made by King Henry the eight and so continued untill the nynth of Queene Elizabeth at which time God tooke him to his mercye, being the yeare of Our Lord 1567. S^{r} John Killigrew, Knight, his son(n)e succeeded him in ye same place by the gift of Queene Elizabeth".

- 1567–1583/4: Sir John IV Killigrew (d.1583/4) of Arwenack, son, 2nd Governor, appointed by Queen Elizabeth I, as stated on his father's brass in St Budock's Church.
- 1584–1598: John V Killigrew (c. 1557 – 1605), of Arwennack, son, 3rd Governor. He was removed from office due to grave suspicions about his loyalty to the English Crown, and for a generation, the Killigrews lost their quasi-hereditary right to the office.
- 1598–1603: Sir Nicholas Parker (died 1603) An inscribed slate ledger stone in his memory exists against the south wall of the chancel of St Budock's Church.
- 1603–?1614: Sir John Parker
- 1614–April 1633: Sir Robert Killigrew (died 1633) of Hanworth, Middlesex, jointly with his eldest son Sir William Killigrew (1606–1695) of Kempton Park, Middlesex, a grandson and great-grandson respectively of John Killigrew (d.1567) of Arwennack, the first Governor.
- 1633–1635: Sir William Killigrew
- April 1635 – 1643: Sir Nicholas Slanning (1606–1643), a Royalist commander during the Civil War. Killed at the battle of Bristol, in 1643. His widow Gertrude Bagg remarried to Richard Arundell, 1st Baron Arundell of Trerice (c.1616-1687), the 2nd son of the next Governor.
- c. 1643 – 1646: Sir John VII Arundell (1576–1654), of Trerice, nicknamed "Jack-for-the-King". During the Civil War in 1646 he held the castle for King Charles I, and withstood a five-month long siege by Parliamentarian forces, at the end of which his forces were reduced by hunger to eating their horses. He obtained an honourable surrender.
- 1646–1648: Col. Richard Fortescue (d.1657), for Parliament. His relationship to the prominent Devonshire family of Fortescue of Filleigh and Weare Giffard is unclear. He was seated at Hickfield in the county of Southampton, and was later Commander-in-Chief in Jamaica, where he died in 1657.
- 1648-1649: John Fox, for Parliament/Commonwealth.
- 1649–1658?: Sir Hardres Waller, for Parliament/Commonwealth.
- 1659–1660: Anthony Rowse, for Parliament/Commonwealth.
- 1660–1662: Sir Peter Killigrew, 2nd Baronet (c. 1634–1704), appointed at the Restoration of the Monarchy in 1660, by General George Monck. A grandson of the 3rd Governor John V Killigrew (c. 1557 – 1605), of Arwennack.
- 1662: Richard Arundell, 1st Baron Arundell of Trerice (c. 1616 – 1687), 2nd son of Governor Sir John VII Arundell (1576–1654), of Trerice, "Jack-for-the-King".
- 1680–1696: John Granville, 1st Earl of Bath (1628–1701), of Stowe, Kilkhampton, Cornwall, who played a leading role in the Restoration of the Monarchy of 1660. He was a cousin of the Arundells of Trerice.
- 1696–1703: Bevil Granville (d.1706), a nephew of the previous Governor John Granville, 1st Earl of Bath (1628–1701)
- 1703–1714: George Granville, 1st Baron Lansdowne, successor to his brother, Governor Bevil Granville (d.1706)
- 1714–1725: Brig-Gen. Richard Munden
- 1726–1734: John Hobart
- 1735–1737: Lt-Gen. James Tyrrell
- 1737–1749: Lt-Gen. William Barrell
- 1749–1753: Lt-Col. John Laforey
- 1753–1774: Lt-Col. Arthur Owen
- 1774–1775: Lt-Col. Charles Beauclerk
- 1775–1793: Lt-Col. Robert Robinson (previously Colonel of 32nd Foot)
- 1793–1823: General Felix Buckley
- 1823–1832: General Sir Martin Hunter (Governor of Stirling Castle, 1832–46)
- 1832–1837: General Paul Anderson(Colonel of 78th (Highlanders) Regiment of Foot, 1837–51)
- office abolished

== Lieutenant-Governors of Pendennis ==
- c.1613: Sir Nicholas Halse
- c.1628: John Tresahar
- 1658–: Robert Roberts
- 1663–: Colonel Legg
- 1666–: Sir John Stevens
- 1697-1717 Captain Richard Trevanion
- 1729–1739?: John Folliott
- ?–1747: Daniel Houghton
- 1747–?: John Waite
- 1749–1769: Richard Bowles
- 12 January 1770 – 1776: William Fawcett
- 1776–1797: Nevinson Poole
- 1797–1811: Philip Melvill
- 1811–1814: James Considine
- 1814–1832: William Fenwick
- 1832–1835: Loftus Grey
- office abolished
