= Felix Buckley =

British Army officer

General Felix Buckley (1724 – 14 September 1823) was a British Army officer.

He joined the British Army as a cornet in 1748 and was made lieutenant in 1750. He was a captain in the Second Troop, Horse Guards in 1751, after which he rose through the ranks as major in 1762, lieutenant-colonel in 1771, colonel in 1779, major-general in 1782 and lieutenant-general in 1796. In 1790 he was made colonel of the recently formed 2nd Life Guards under Jeffrey Amherst, 1st Baron Amherst. He was promoted full general on 1 January 1801.

He served as Governor of Pendennis Castle from 1793 to 1823. He had a London home at 1 Upper Brook Street, Mayfair, from 1802 to 1812.

He died at Cobham Lodge, Surrey, having spent some 72 years in the Army. There is a monument to his memory in the nave south aisle of St Andrew's church, Cobham.
