= Alfred Douglas Miller =

British Army officer (1864–1933)

Brigadier-General Alfred Douglas Miller CBE DSO
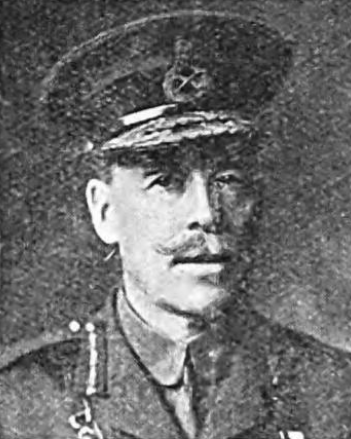
- Born: 1 March 1864
- Died: 5 December 1933 (aged 69)
- Relatives: Sir John Miller (son)
- Military career
- Allegiance: United Kingdom
- Branch: British Army
- Rank: Brigadier-General
- Unit: 2nd Dragoons (Royal Scots Greys)
- Commands: 2nd Dragoon Regiment (Royal Scots Grey)
- Conflicts: Second Boer War; First World War
- Awards: Commander of the Order of the British Empire; Distinguished Service Order; Mentioned in Despatches

Brigadier-General Alfred Douglas Miller, CBE, DSO (1 March 1864 − 5 December 1933) was a British Army officer.

== Early life ==
Miller was the son of Lieutenant-Colonel James Miller (1829−1909), late 11th Hussars, of Shotover Park, Wheatley, Oxfordshire, JP, DL, High Sheriff of Oxfordshire in 1880, and Sarah Dorothy (d. 1911), daughter of Thomas Moore Evans. The Miller family were, in previous generations, merchants in Scotland, with James Miller's father, Alexander, coming to own Ashford Hall, Middlesex.

== Military career ==
Miller was commissioned a lieutenant in the 2nd Dragoons (Royal Scots Greys) on 7 February 1885, in the same class as Douglas Haig, and promoted to the rank of captain on 28 June 1893. He was adjutant of the Royal Scots Greys from 1896 to 1900.

With the outbreak of the Second Boer War in October 1899, he was chief staff officer to Sir John French and, on 24 December 1901, he was appointed a deputy assistant adjutant general on the staff in South Africa. He was promoted major on 20 February 1902. For his service in the war, Miller was mentioned in despatches (dated 8 April 1902) received the Distinguished Service Order (DSO) in the South Africa Honours list published on 26 June 1902, and was noted for future staff employment.

Miller led the 2nd Dragoon Regiment (Royal Scots Grey) as a lieutenant colonel from 1907 to 1911, was promoted to colonel in 1911, and ultimately reached the rank of brigadier general. He was appointed a Commander of the Order of the British Empire in the 1919 New Year Honours.

== Personal life ==
In 1899, Miller married Ella Geraldine, daughter of John Fletcher, of Saltoun Hall, of a landed gentry family. They had five children. He died in England on 5 December 1933.
