= Forest Hill with Shotover =

Coordinates: 51.758°N 1.165°W

- Civil parish
- Location within Oxfordshire
- Civil parish: Forest Hill with Shotover
- District: South Oxfordshire
- Shire county: Oxfordshire
- Region: South East
- Country: England
- Sovereign state: United Kingdom
- Post town: Oxford
- Postcode district: OX33
- Dialling code: 01865
- Police: Thames Valley
- Fire: Oxfordshire
- Ambulance: South Central
- UK Parliament: Henley and Thame

Forest Hill with Shotover is a civil parish covering 7.56 km^{2} of South Oxfordshire approximately centred 3 miles (4.8 km) east of Oxford. Its population in 2011 was 856, almost exclusively in the villages of Forest Hill, hamlets of Shotover Cleve and Shotover Edge. It includes a country estate at Shotover Park. Forest Hill with Shotover was formed in 1881 by the merger of three smaller civil parishes: Forest Hill, Shotover and Shotover Hill Place.

== Sources ==
- Lobel, Mary D. (1957). Victoria County History: A History of the County of Oxford: Volume 5: Bullingdon Hundred. pp. 122–134.
