= William Barrell =

British general

Lieutenant-General William Barrell
- Died: 8 August 1749
- Burial place: Westminster Abbey
- Military career
- Allegiance: England; Great Britain
- Branch: English Army; British Army
- Service years: 1698–1749
- Rank: Lieutenant-General
- Unit: 1st Regiment of Foot Guards
- Commands: Governor of Pendennis Castle
- Conflicts: War of the Spanish Succession; Battle of Blenheim

Lieutenant-General William Barrell (died 9 August 1749) was a British Army officer.

== Career ==
Barrell joined the English Army as a captain on 27 March 1698. He served with distinction in the War of the Spanish Succession and was granted brevet rank as a colonel of Foot by the Duke of Marlborough on 1 January 1707. In 1715 he was made colonel of the 15th Regiment of Foot, and in 1727 he was promoted to brigadier-general. On 25 August 1730 he was removed to the 22nd Regiment of Foot, and on 8 August 1734 to the King's Own. He was promoted to major-general in 1735 and lieutenant-general in 1739; he also held the post of Governor of Pendennis Castle.

Military offices
Preceded by Andrews Windsor	Colonel of Barrell's Regiment of Foot; 1715–1730	Succeeded by Nicholas Price
Preceded by Roger Handasyd	Colonel of Barrell's Regiment of Foot; 1730–1734	Succeeded by James St Clair
Preceded by The Lord Cadogan	Colonel of the King's Own Regiment of Foot; 1734–1749	Succeeded by Robert Rich
Preceded by James Tyrrell	Governor of Pendennis Castle; 1737–1749	Succeeded by John Laforey
