= Samuel Graham (British Army officer) =

British Army general

Lieutenant-General Samuel Graham
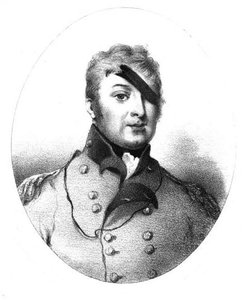
- Born: 20 May 1756; Paisley
- Died: 26 January 1831 (aged 74)
- Military career
- Allegiance: United Kingdom
- Branch: British Army
- Rank: Lieutenant-General
- Conflicts: American Revolutionary War; French Revolutionary Wars; Second Carib War; Anglo-Russian invasion of Holland

Lieutenant-General Samuel Graham (20 May 1756 – 26 January 1831) was a British Army officer who commanded the 27th Enniskillen Regiment during the Anglo-Russian invasion of Holland.

== Early life ==
Graham was born the son of John Graham and Euphanel Graham (née Stenson). Educated at Paisley Grammar School, Graham studied medicine before entering the army.

== Military career ==
The Battle of Callantsoog, at which Graham was wounded

Graham became an ensign by purchase in the 31st Regiment of Foot and was based at Edinburgh Castle in 1777. He transferred to the 76th Regiment of Foot and was deployed to North America in August 1779 during the American Revolutionary War. Following the British surrender at Yorktown, he was held as a prisoner of war (POW) in Lancaster, Pennsylvania. In May 1782, he was one of 13 POWs forced to draw lots to determine which one should be executed in retaliation for the execution of a patriot captain by Loyalists, in what became known as the Asgill Affair.

After returning to England in February 1784, he transferred to the 19th Regiment of Foot in April 1786 and was deployed to Jamaica in 1787. He was sent to Holland in September 1793 and took part in the relief of Nieuwpoort during the Flanders campaign. He was deployed to Saint Vincent in June 1795 and was wounded during the Second Carib War. Graham went on to become commanding officer of the 27th Enniskillen Regiment in January 1797. He was severely wounded later that same year in the Battle of Callantsoog, during the Anglo-Russian invasion of Holland. He took part in the Battle of Alexandria in March 1801 and then returned to England later in the year.

Graham became Deputy Governor of Stirling Castle in May 1800 and then took command of the garrison at Cork in 1808. He returned to Stirling Castle in 1814 and lived there until his death on 26 January 1831.

== Sources ==
- Graham, James John (1862). Memoir of General Graham: with notices of the campaigns in which he was engaged from 1779 to 1801. Edinburgh: R. & R. Clark. p. 107.
