= Timothy Tyrrell =

Privy Chamber to King Charles I

Sir Timothy Tyrrell (1617–1701), initially of Oakley, Buckinghamshire and later of Shotover, was of the Privy Chamber to King Charles I.

== Life ==
He faithfully and valiantly asserted the cause of his master, King Charles I, and was a captain of a cavalry regiment, colonel of a foot regiment, governor of Cardiff Castle in Wales, and general of the ordnance in that province.

According to his memorial "He was an indulgent husband, a kind father, and a good master; just in his dealings, and highly charitable to the poor". He died on 23 October 1701, at the age of 84 years. He is buried in Oakley Church.

== Family ==
He was the eldest son of Sir Timothy Tyrrell. He married Elizabeth Ussher, the only daughter of Dr. James Usher, Archbishop of Armagh and Primate of All Ireland, by whom he had four sons and eight daughters.

Their first son was James Tyrrell and second son was John Tyrrell.
