= Shotover =

Hill in the United Kingdom

Coordinates: 51°44′58″N 1°10′54″W

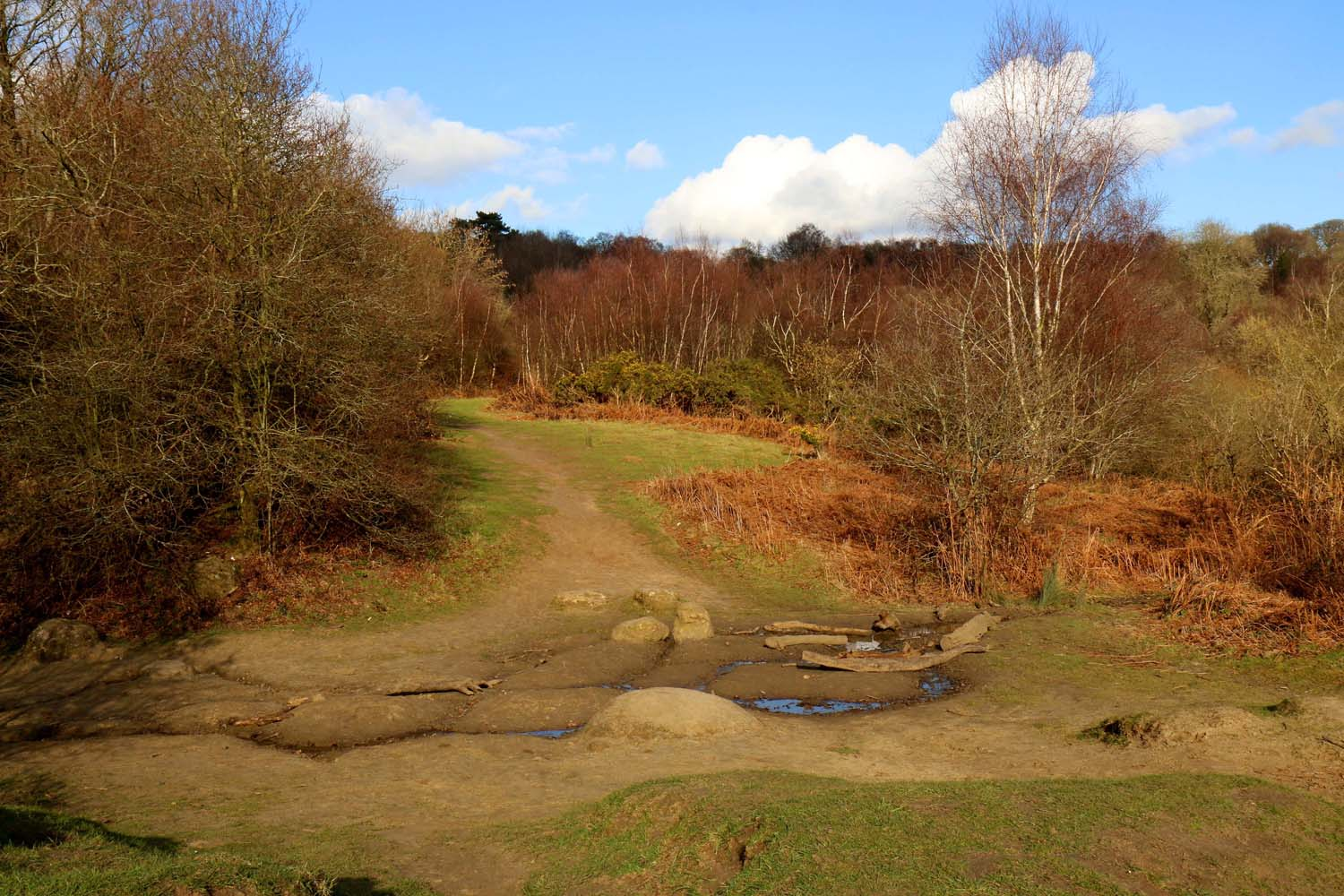
- The Sandpit in Shotover Country Park

- Location within Oxfordshire
- Civil parish: Forest Hill with Shotover
- District: South Oxfordshire
- Shire county: Oxfordshire
- Region: South East
- Country: England
- Sovereign state: United Kingdom

Shotover is a hill and forest in the civil parish of Forest Hill with Shotover, in the South Oxfordshire district, in the county of Oxfordshire, England. The hill is 3 miles (4.8 km) east of Oxford. Its highest point is 557 feet (170 m) above sea level.

== Early history ==
The toponym may be derived from the Old English scēot ofer, meaning "steep slope". Shotover was part of the Wychwood royal forest from around the period of the Domesday Book until 1660. It was also known as the Forest of Shotover.

A hill figure is recorded as having once been carved on the hill. Antiquarian John Aubrey writes:

"On Shotover Hill [near Oxford] was heretofore (not long before the Civil Wars, in the memory of man) the effigies of a Giant cut in the earth, as the White Horse by Ashbury Park"

Shotover was formerly an extra-parochial tract, in 1858 Shotover became a separate civil parish, on 25 March 1883 the parish was abolished and merged with Forest Hill. In 1851 it had a population of 163.

== Shotover Road ==
The road between London and Oxford used to pass over the top of Shotover Hill. The road was made into a turnpike under the 1719 Stokenchurch Turnpike Act.

== Shotover Park ==
Shotover Park and garden were begun in about 1714 for James Tyrrell of Oakley. Tyrell died in 1718 and the house was completed by his son, General James Tyrell. There is no known record of the name of the architect. In 1855 the architect Joshua Sims added two wings in the same style of the original part of the house.

The garden was begun in 1718 and completed in 1730. It is a rare survivor of formal gardens of this period, laid out along an east–west axis 1,200 yards (1,100 m) long. The centrepiece of the garden east of the house is a straight canal, ending with a Gothic Revival folly. The architect of the folly is unknown, but if it was built before 1742 it may be one of the earliest examples of the Gothic Revival. The garden west of the house has a similarly long vista, ending with an octagonal temple designed in the 1730s by William Kent.

During the Second World War there was a prisoner-of-war camp in the grounds.

Major Alexander Alfred Miller and his youngest brother, Lieutenant-Colonel Sir John Miller (Crown Equerry 1961–87), both lived in Shotover Park.

Shotover Park and the wider estate is privately owned by the Shotover Trust. It lies on the north and east slopes of Shotover hill and should not be confused with Shotover Country Park (see below).

== Shotover Country Park ==
Shotover Country Park is a public park and nature reserve on the southwest slopes of Shotover Hill managed by Oxford City Council.

== References in popular culture ==
"Shotover Hill" is a track on the album Supergrass by the Oxford indie band of the same name.

Shotover, the woods and hill, are mentioned at the start and end of Towers in the Mist (Gerald Duckworth, London, 1938) by Elizabeth Goudge, an historical novel set in 1565 and 1566 in and around Oxford during Queen Elizabeth I's first visit to Oxford in 1566.

== Sources and further reading ==
- Lobel, Mary D, ed. (1957). "Parishes: Shotover". A History of the County of Oxford: Volume 5, Bullingdon Hundred. Victoria County History. London. pp. 275–281.
- Roberts, Edward (1963). "The Boundary and Woodlands of Shotover Forest circa 1298" (PDF). Oxoniensia. XXVIII. Oxford Architectural and Historical Society: 68–73.
- Sherwood, Jennifer; Pevsner, Nikolaus (1974). Oxfordshire. The Buildings of England. Harmondsworth: Penguin Books. pp. 763–765. ISBN 0-14-071045-0.
