= James Tyrrell (writer) =

English author, Whig political philosopher and historian

- Born: May 5, 1642; London, England
- Died: 17 June 1718 (aged 76); Shotover, England

Education
- Education: The Queen's College, Oxford

Philosophical work
- Era: 17th-century philosophy
- Region: Western philosophy
- Main interests: Political philosophy

James Tyrrell (5 May 1642 – 17 June 1718) was an English author, Whig political philosopher, and historian. He was the grandson of James Ussher and a friend of John Locke.

== Life ==
James Tyrrell was born in London, the eldest son of Sir Timothy Tyrrell and Elizabeth Tyrrell (née Ussher), the only daughter of Archbishop James Ussher. His younger sister Eleanor married the deist Charles Blount. He lived in Oakley, Buckinghamshire. He was married to Mary Hutchinson (1645-1687), daughter of Sir Michael Hutchinson of Fladbury, Worcestershire. They had at least three children, including James Tyrrell and Mary and another son.

Educated at The Queen's College, Oxford (MA, 1663), he became a barrister in 1666 and a justice of the peace in Buckinghamshire. He was deprived of this office by James II for failing to support the Declaration of Indulgence. At the time of the Peace of Rijswijk (1697), he was persuaded back into public service by Thomas Herbert, 8th Earl of Pembroke (Lord Pembroke) to become Commissioner of the Privy Seal.

Tyrrell was a friend and supporter of John Locke, who stayed at Tyrrell's home during a period when he was apparently working on his Two Treatises on Government. Tyrrell's thinking appears to have been influential in the development of Locke's, and for a time his writings were more influential than Locke's in the emergence of Whig thinking and policies.

When Pierre Des Maizeaux set about compiling A Collection of Several Pieces of Mr. John Locke, a posthumous edition of lesser-known works and manuscripts, he recorded his conversations with Tyrrell who spoke at some length about his friend. The manuscript was discovered in 2021.

He spent his later years in Shotover, near Oxford and began building Shotover Park there, where he died on 17 June 1718, though he is buried in the church in Oakley.

According to a memorial to him, "He was a man of rare integrity, gravity, and wisdom: had never polished himself out of his sincerity: nor refined his behaviour to the prejudice of his virtue. He was a warm and zealous lover of his country, & of that system of religion and law which he well knew could only support it."

== Works ==
His Patriarcha non monarcha (1681) was a reply to Robert Filmer's Patriarcha; it also included references to Thomas Hobbes, and was also influenced by Samuel Pufendorf. A Brief Disquisition of the Law of Nature was an English abridgment of Richard Cumberland's De legibus naturae. Bibliothetica politica was a huge compendium of Whig constitutional theory.

- Patriarcha non monarcha. The patriarch unmonarch'd: being observations on a late treatise and divers other miscellanies, published under the name of Sir Robert Filmer baronet. In which the falseness of those opinions that would make monarchy jure divino are laid open: and the true principles of government and property (especially in our kingdom) asserted. By a lover of truth and of his country, 1681
- A brief disquisition of the law of nature, according to the principles laid down in the reverend Dr. Cumberland's (now Lord Bishop of Peterborough's) Latin treatise on that subject. As also his considerations of Mr. Hobbs's principles put into another method, 1692
- Bibliotheca politica: or An enquiry into the ancient constitution of the English government; both in respect to the just extent of regal power, and the rights and liberties of the subject. Wherein all the chief arguments, as well against, as for the late revolution, are impartially represented, and considered, in thirteen dialogues. Collected out of the best authors, as well antient as modern ..., 1694
- The General History of England, both Ecclesiastical and Civil (5 volumes, published between 1700 and 1704). In which Tyrrell demonstrates that the liberties of the people are not concessions of kings.

== Sources ==
- Julia Rudolph, Revolution by Degrees: James Tyrrell and Whig Political Thought in the Late Seventeenth Century (Studies in Modern History), 2002.
