= Bevil Granville =

English soldier and politician

Sir Bevil Granville MP JP
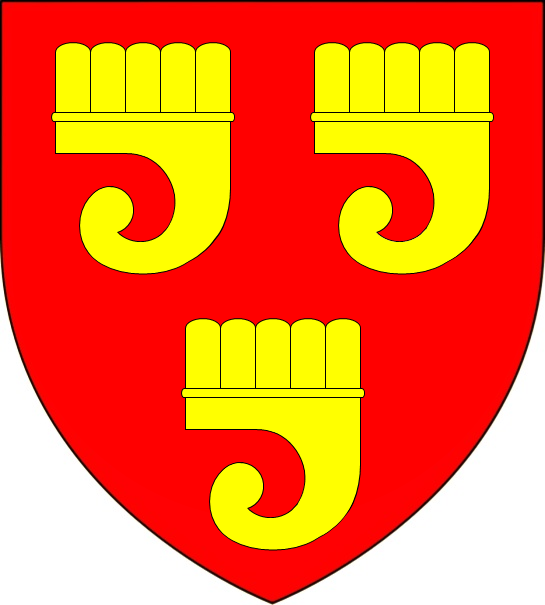
- Granville arms

Governor of Barbados
- In office 1703–1706
- Monarch: Queen Anne

Governor of Pendennis Castle
- In office March 1696 – 1703

Member of Parliament for Fowey
- In office 1695–1698

Member of Parliament for Lostwithiel
- In office March 1690 – July 1695

Personal details
- Born: 3 May 1665 (baptised) London
- Died: 15 September 1706 (aged 41) At sea, returning from Barbados
- Cause of death: Fever
- Relations: John Granville, 1st Earl of Bath (uncle);
- Parent(s): Bernard Granville (1631–1701); Anne Morley;
- Education: Trinity College, Cambridge
- Occupation: Soldier, politician and colonial administrator

Military service
- Allegiance: England
- Years of service: 1685 – 1703
- Rank: Brigadier General
- Unit: Granville's Regiment of Foot
- Battles/wars: Glorious Revolution; Nine Years War; Steenkerque; Siege of Namur

Sir Bevil Granville (3 May 1665 – 15 September 1706) was an English soldier and politician from Cornwall, who was MP for Fowey and Lostwithiel from 1690 to 1698. He also served as Governor of Pendennis Castle from 1693 to 1703 and Governor of Barbados from 1703 to 1706, and died at sea on his return voyage to England in September 1706.

== Personal details ==
Bevil Granville was born in London and baptised on 3 May 1665 at St Martin-in-the-Fields, eldest son of Bernard Granville (1631–1701) and his wife Anne Morley (died 1701). His grandfather was the Royalist hero Sir Bevil Grenville (1596–1643) who died at the Battle of Lansdowne, while his father was Groom of the Chamber to Charles II and MP for various constituencies from 1661 to 1698.

He had two brothers, George (1666–1735), Secretary at War in the 1710 to 1712 Tory government, and Bernard (1670–1723); both were suspected of Jacobitism after George I became king in 1714 and lost office as a result. Bevil never married and left his entire estate to his brother George.

== Career ==
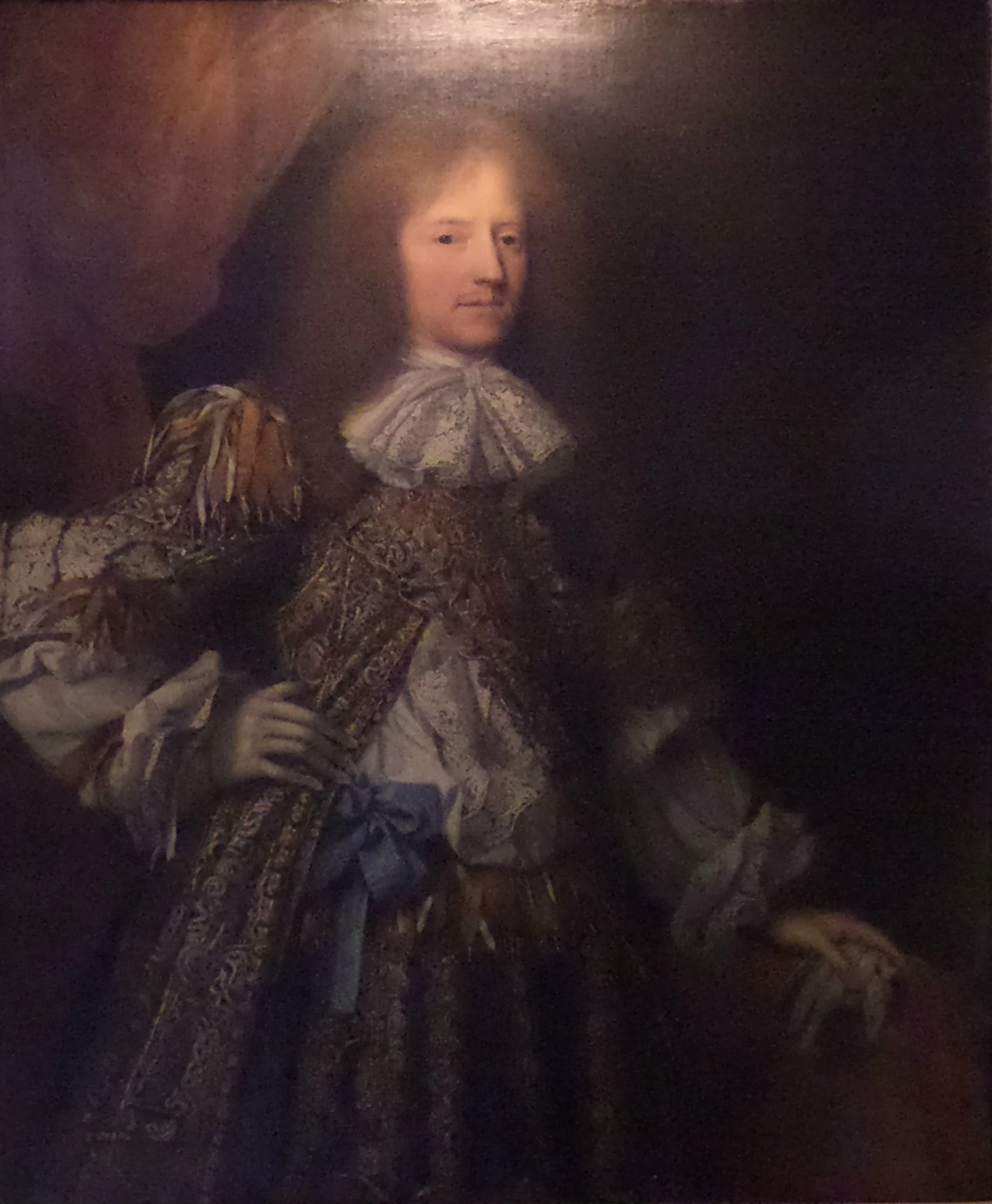
Granville's uncle and patron, the Earl of Bath

After graduating from Trinity College, Cambridge in 1679, he spent several years in Paris, before returning to England. In June 1685, he was commissioned as captain in a regiment raised by his uncle, the Earl of Bath, part of an expansion of the military by James II following the Monmouth Rebellion.

Knighted by James in 1686, he was promoted major in 1687 and in August 1688 his regiment was sent to garrison Plymouth, a key strategic port in the West Country. His uncle, who was Governor of the town, defected to William of Orange after his landing at Torbay during the November 1688 Glorious Revolution, while Granville was sent to secure Jersey.

In March 1690, he was elected MP for Lostwithiel, a borough controlled by his uncle, although he spent little time in the House of Commons. By now a lieutenant colonel, his regiment was transferred to Ostend at the end of 1691 to serve in the Nine Years War and suffered heavy casualties at Steenkerque in August 1692. He replaced the Earl of Bath as colonel of the regiment in October 1693, and returned to England in December, having transferred operational command to Sidney Godolphin. (Note: Holding a commission did not require actual service and particularly at senior levels, ownership and command were separate functions. Although many colonels played active roles, it was common to delegate operational duties to a lieutenant colonel, allowing them to combine political and military duties.)

During the Siege of Namur in June 1695, he fought a duel with the Marquis de Rade, a French Huguenot exile and Colonel of the 6th Foot, who died of wounds shortly afterwards. In November 1695, he was elected MP for Fowey, another borough controlled by the Earl of Bath. His regiment returned to England in early 1696 due to fears of a Jacobite invasion, and in a demonstration of his perceived reliability, on 21 March he was appointed Governor of Pendennis Castle in Cornwall. Although the invasion failed to materialise, he and his regiment remained in England until the war ended with the 1697 Peace of Ryswick.

Re-elected for Fowey in August 1698, at the next election in January 1701 he stepped down in favour of his cousin John Granville. When the War of the Spanish Succession began in July, his regiment was posted to Flanders; Granville did not accompany it, having been appointed Governor of Barbados in May 1702, with a salary of £2,000 per annum. This meant he would have to relinquish Pendennis Castle, ownership of his regiment and his army rank, which led to a complex series of negotiations and delayed his departure until March 1703. In the end, he sold his regiment to William North, 6th Baron North in January, , (Note: Regiments belonged to and were named after their current colonel and could be bought and sold; as one of the most senior units in the Army, the 10th Foot, or Granville's Regiment, was a valuable asset. Purchases were often driven by political considerations.) Marlborough approved his promotion to brigadier general and his brother George replaced him as Governor of Pendennis Castle.

Accompanied by his youngest brother Bernard, Granville reached Barbados in June, but his time there was marked by poor health and struggles with the Parliament of Barbados. A colonial governorship provided many opportunities for personal enrichment and the settlers began complaining to Parliament of his "tyranny and extortion". Although "honourably acquitted" at a hearing on 20 July 1705, Granville asked Marlborough to approve his recall, which he did; (Note: It is also suggested Parliament decided it was best to end his governorship in light of his quarrels with the settlers) on 15 September 1706, he died of fever on board the ship bringing him home.

== Sources ==
- Cannon, Richard (1847). Historical record of the Tenth, or the North Lincolnshire Regiment Containing an Account of the Formation of the Regiment in 1685 and of its Subsequent Services to 1847. CIHM/ICMH collection de microfiches no. 48345. Parker, Furnivall and Parker. ISBN 978-0-665-48345-5.
- Childs, John (1986). The Army, James II and the Glorious Revolution. Manchester University Press. ISBN 978-0-7190-0688-3.
- Crosette, JS (1983). Henning, Basil (ed.). GRANVILLE (GRENVILLE), Bevil (1665-1706) in The History of Parliament: the House of Commons 1690–1715. Boydell & Brewer. ISBN 978-1-107-00225-8.
- Cruickshanks, Eveline; Handley, Stuart (2002). Granville, George (1666–1735), of Stowe, Cornw in The History of Parliament: the House of Commons 1690–1715 (online scan ed.). Boydell & Brewer. ISBN 978-0-521-78318-7.
- Dalton, Charles, ed. (1904). English Army Lists and Commission Registers, 1661–1714. Vol. V. Eyre & Sporttiswoode. OCLC 857106805.
- Guy, Alan (1985). Economy and Discipline: Officership and the British Army, 1714–63. Manchester University Press. ISBN 978-0-7190-1099-6.
- Ledward, K, ed. (1920). Journal, February 1705: Journal Book I, in Journals of the Board of Trade and Plantations Volume 1, April 1704 – January 1709 (online scan ed.). HMSO. OCLC 847682292.
- Onnekirk, David (2017). Glozier, Mathew (ed.). War, Religion and Service: Huguenot Soldiering, 1685–1713. Routledge. ISBN 978-1-138-27575-1.
- Webb, Stephen Saunders (2012). Marlborough's America. Yale University Press. ISBN 978-0-300-17859-3.
- Zacek, Natalie (2004). "Granville [Grenville], Sir Bevil (1665–1706)". Oxford Dictionary of National Biography (online ed.). Oxford University Press. doi:10.1093/ref:odnb/11300. (Subscription, Wikipedia Library access or UK public library membership required.)

Military offices
Preceded by The Earl of Bath	Colonel of Granville's Regiment of Foot; 1693–1703	Succeeded by The Lord North and Grey
Preceded by The Earl of Bath	Governor of Pendennis Castle; 1696–1703	Succeeded by George Granville
