= Timothy Tyrrell (died 1632) =

Sir Timothy Tyrrell (also spelled Tirrell; c. 1575–1632) was an Englishman who served as Master of the Buckhounds to Henry Frederick, Prince of Wales, and King Charles I. His fee as master of the buckhounds in 1616 was £20 yearly.

== Family ==
Tyrrell was born in Oakley, Buckinghamshire, the son of Sir Edward Tyrrell, Member of Parliament for Buckingham, by his second wife, Margaret. He was the brother of politician and judge Thomas Tyrrell.

He married Eleanor Kingsmill, daughter of Sir William Kingsmill (died 1618) of Sydmonton and Anne Wilkes, on 22 August 1613 in Marsworth, Buckinghamshire. They had seven children:

- Sir Timothy Tyrrell (1617–1701), also Master of the Hounds to King Charles
- William, killed in the English Civil War at the Siege of Chester in 1644
- Henry, ranger of Whaddon Chase
- Charles, died unmarried, 1694
- Eleanor, married first to Sir Peter Temple; secondly to Richard Grenville of Wotton, with whom she had Richard Grenville, M.P.
- Bridget, died unmarried
- Mary, married to Sir Walter Pye

== Shotover Park ==
Tyrrell was granted the rangership of Shotover Forest after a freak hunting accident early in the 17th century, in which he was maimed by the teenaged Henry, Prince of Wales, eldest son of King James I. According to a chronicle of the unfortunate accident:

The estate belonged to the Crown. and was granted to the TyrreIls in recognition of the following incident. Sir Timothy Tyrrell, being Master of the Buck-hounds to Henry, Prince of Wales (son of James I), was shooting with the Prince in Shotover Forest, and, on holding the buck's head for the Prince to cut it off, the Prince cut Sir Timothy's hand in such a way as permanently to deprive him of the use of it. On Sir Timothy's next appearance at Court, the Prince granted him the Rangership of the Forests of Shotover and Stow Wood.

In 1613, following Prince Henry's death in 1612, King James confirmed the rangership of Shotover by letters patent for the duration of the lives of Timothy Tyrrell and his two sons, Timothy (Master of the Buckhounds to King Charles I) and William.

On 29 August 1624, King James knighted Tyrrell at Shotover while attending a sporting hunt. Tyrrell died in 1632.

Court offices
Preceded by Sir Thomas Tyringham	Master of the Buckhounds; 1612–1632	Succeeded by Sir Thomas Tyringham
