= Westcombe baronets =

Extinct baronetcy in the Baronetage of England

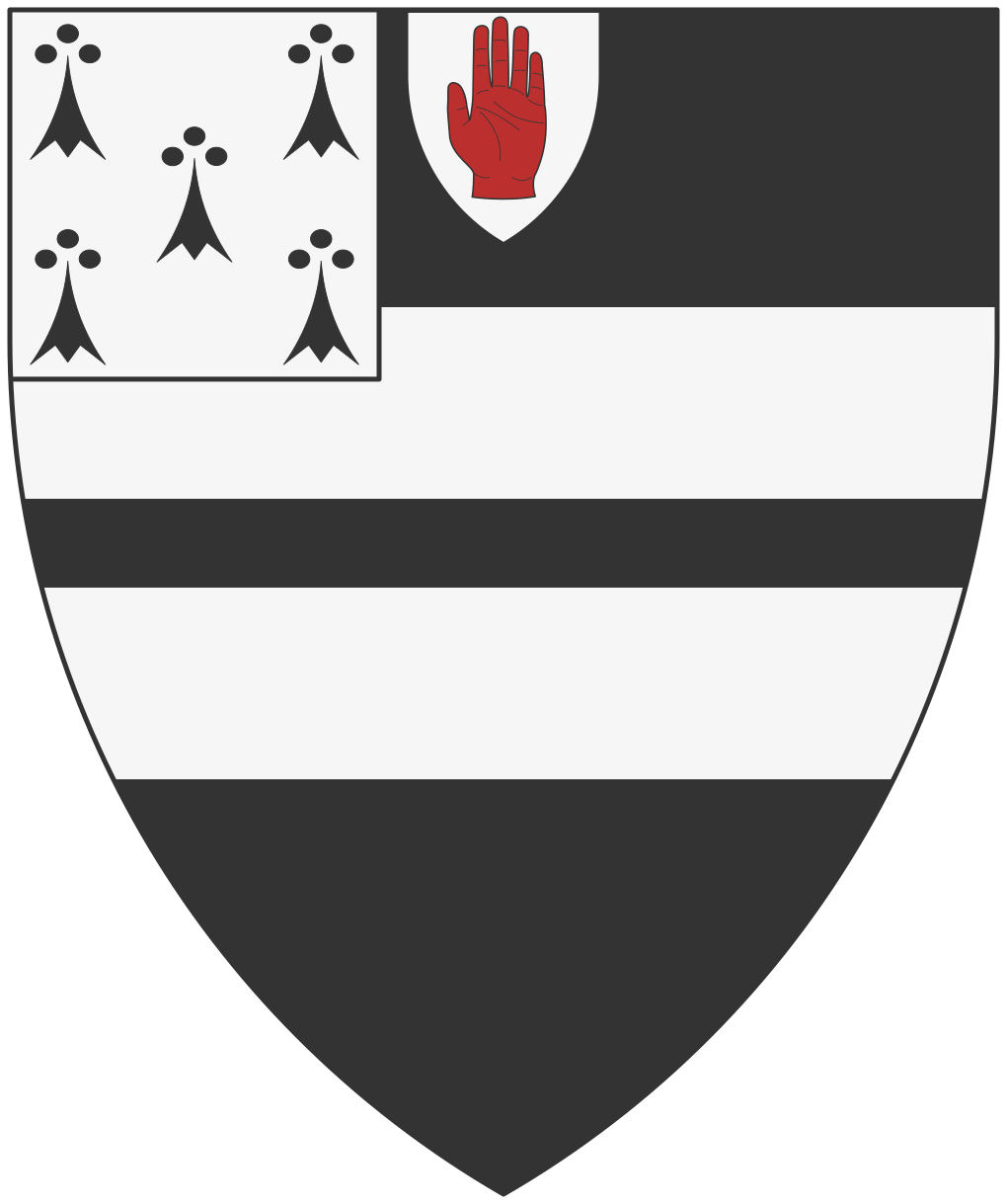
Arms of Westcombe of Cadiz

The Westcombe Baronetcy, of Cadiz in Spain, was a title in the Baronetage of England. It was created on 23 March 1700 for Martin Westcombe, English Consul at Cádiz, Spain. The title became extinct on the death of the second Baronet in 1752.

== Westcombe baronets, of Cadiz (1700) ==
- Sir Martin Westcombe, 1st Baronet (died before 1736)
- Sir Anthony Westcombe, 2nd Baronet (c. 1708–1752)
