= Archibald Christie (British Army officer, born 1774) =

Colonel Sir Archibald Christie, KCH of Riddry, formerly of Stenton, (1774–1847) was an army officer. He was the son of James Christie, an officer in the Royal Dragoons, and Lucy, daughter of John Beardsley of Glascott, Warwickshire.

Archibald Christie served in many important military engagements in Flanders and Holland, where he was wounded. In reward for his service, he was appointed a Knight of the Royal Guelphic Order (also known as the Hanoverian Guelphic Order). He was appointed as a Commandant-General of army hospitals in 1811 and as a Colonel of the 1st Royal Veteran Battalion in 1819.

He was commandant at Chatham for twenty years and was subsequently appointed Deputy Governor of Stirling Castle.

Christie married Jane (d. 1843) in Co. Limerick. She was the only child of George Dwyer, Esquire, son of John Dwyer, Esquire of Singland.

He died at Stirling Castle in August, 1847, and his remains were interred in Logie churchyard.
