= Governor of Stirling Castle =

Scottish military office

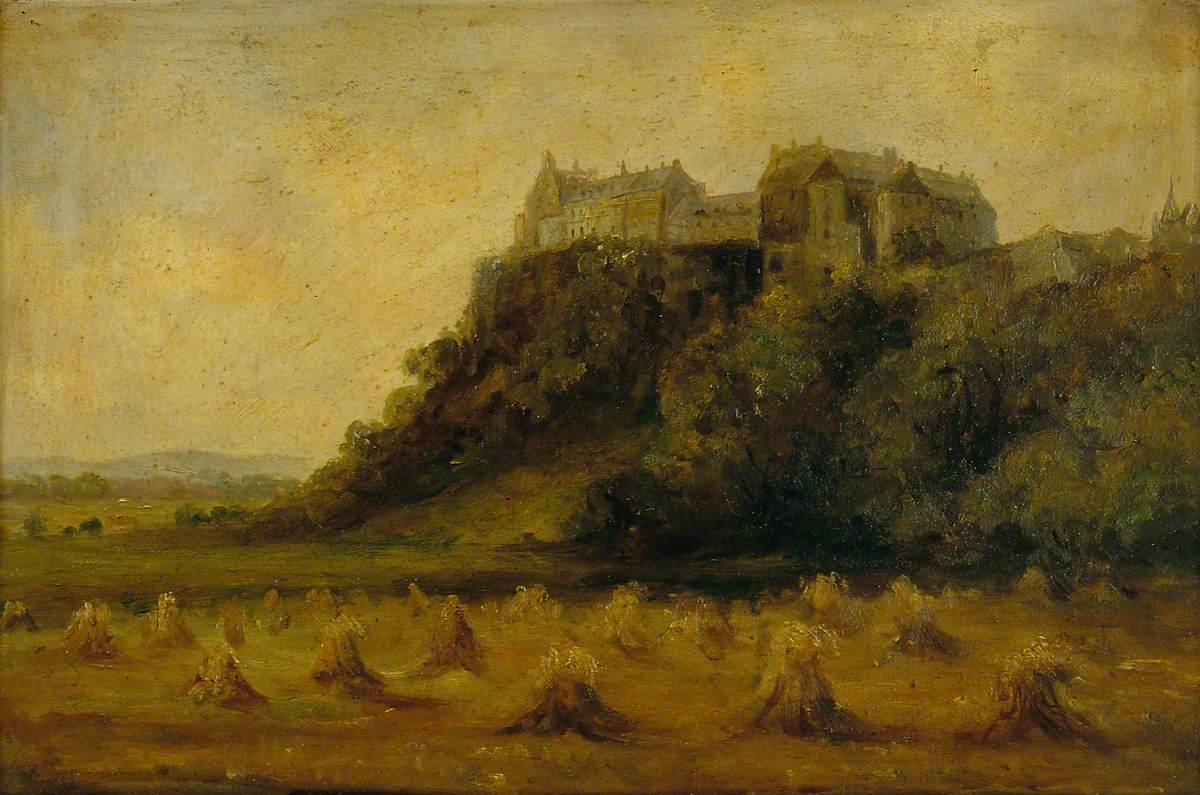
Sitrling Castle

The Governor of Stirling Castle was the military officer who commanded Stirling Castle, in Scotland. Control of the castle frequently passed between the Scots and the English during the Wars of Scottish Independence. The castle's military character was maintained for several centuries, the last siege occurring in 1746 during the Jacobite risings. It continued to be used as a military barracks until 1964.

== Governors of Stirling Castle ==
- 1715–1716: Sir James Campbell, 2nd Baronet, of Ardkinglass
- 1716–1722: John Hamilton-Leslie, 9th Earl of Rothes
- 1722–1741: John Leslie, 10th Earl of Rothes
- 1741–1763: John Campbell, 4th Earl of Loudoun
- 1763: Isaac Barré
- 1763–1788: Sir James Campbell, 3rd Baronet
- 1788–1789: Alexander Mackay
- 1789–1806: James Grant
- 1806–1832: John Hely-Hutchinson, 2nd Earl of Donoughmore
- 1832–1846?: Sir Martin Hunter

== Deputy Governors of Stirling Castle ==
- 1717–1729: Colonel John Blackadder (1664-1729);
- bef. 1739–1781: James Abercrombie
- 1781–1796: Thomas Musgrave
- 1796–1800: William Goodday Strutt
- 1800–1831: Samuel Graham
- 1831–1847: Colonel Archibald Christie
