= James Tyrrell (British Army officer) =

British Army officer and Whig politician

Lieutenant-General James Tyrrell (c. 1674 – 30 August 1742) of Shotover, Oxfordshire, was a British Army officer and Whig politician who sat in the House of Commons from 1722 to 1742.

== Background ==
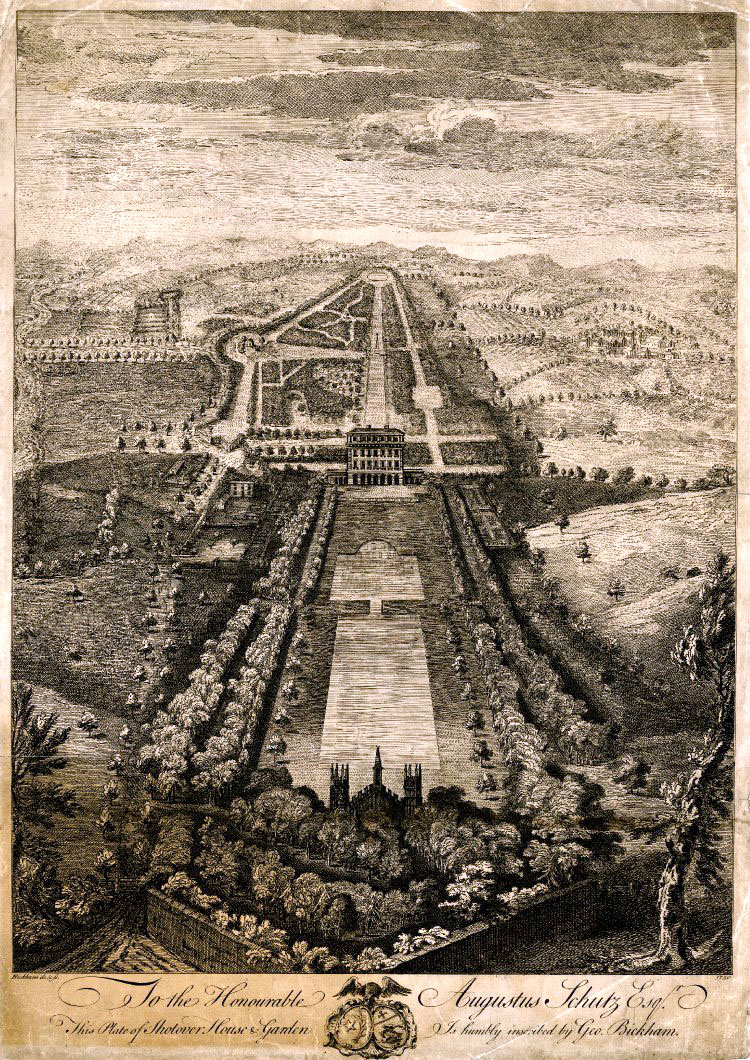
Shotover engraving by George Bickham the Younger, 1750

Tyrrell was the only son of James Tyrrell of Oakley, Buckinghamshire and his wife Mary Hutchinson, daughter of Sir Michael Hutchinson. His father began construction of Shotover Park in Oxfordshire in the early 18th century and James completed it after his father's death in 1718.

Tyrrell joined the army and was an ensign in a regiment of foot on 6 February 1694 and served under King William III in the Netherlands. He distinguished himself in the wars of Queen Anne and was promoted to the colonelcy of a newly raised regiment of foot in April 1709. At the peace of Utrecht his regiment was disbanded, and in 1715 he raised a regiment of dragoons for the service of King George I, which was disbanded in November 1718. On 7 November 1722 the King gave him the colonelcy of the 17th Regiment of Foot. Tyrrell was promoted to the rank of brigadier-general in 1727, to that of major-general in 1735, and lieutenant-general in 1739.

On the accession of King George I in 1714 Tyrrell was made a Groom of the Bedchamber, serving as a member of the royal household until the King's death in 1727.

At the 1722 British general election, Tyrrell was returned as Member of Parliament for Boroughbridge, one of the Duke of Newcastle's pocket boroughs. He voted consistently with the Government in that parliament and after he was returned in 1727, 1734 and 1741. He was appointed as Governor of Pendennis Castle and Gravesend and Tilbury in 1737 and as Governor of Berwick-upon-Tweed in May 1742.

Tyrrell died unmarried on 30 August 1742.

Parliament of Great Britain
Preceded by Sir Richard Steele; Sir Wilfrid Lawson	Member of Parliament for Boroughbridge; 1722–1742; With: Conyers Darcy 1722; Joseph Danvers 1722–1727; George Gregory 1727–1742	Succeeded by George Gregory; William Murray
Military offices
Preceded by Sir Roger Bradshaigh	Colonel of Tyrrell's Regiment of Foot; 1709–1713	Regiment disbanded
New regiment	Colonel of Tyrrell's Regiment of Dragoons; 1715–1718	Regiment disbanded
Preceded by Thomas Ferrers	Colonel of Tyrrell's Regiment of Foot; 1722–1742	Succeeded by John Wynyard
Preceded by John Hobart	Governor of Pendennis Castle; 1735–1737	Succeeded by William Barrell
Preceded by Sir Multon Lambard	Governor of Gravesend and Tilbury; 1737–1742	Succeeded by Adam Williamson
Preceded by Thomas Whetham	Governor of Berwick-upon-Tweed; 1742	Succeeded by Thomas Howard
