= John Miller (equerry) =

British Army officer and courtier (1919–2006)

Sir John Miller
- Sir John Miller at the Royal Mews, 1987 (photo by Kit Houghton)
- Born: 4 February 1919; Shotover Park, Wheatley, Oxfordshire
- Died: 17 May 2006 (aged 87); Wheatley, Oxfordshire
- Relatives: Brigadier General Alfred Douglas Miller (father)
- Military career
- Allegiance: United Kingdom
- Branch: British Army
- Service years: 1939–1961
- Rank: Lieutenant Colonel
- Service number: 85599
- Unit: Welsh Guards
- Commands: 1st Battalion, Welsh Guards (1958–61)
- Conflicts: Second World War
- Awards: Knight Grand Cross of the Royal Victorian Order; Distinguished Service Order; Military Cross
- Other work: Crown Equerry to Queen Elizabeth II (1961–87)

Lieutenant Colonel Sir John Mansel Miller, GCVO, DSO, MC (4 February 1919 – 17 May 2006) was a British Army officer and equestrian who served as Crown Equerry to Queen Elizabeth II from 1961 to 1987.

== Early life and education ==
Miller was born in 1919 at the family estate of Shotover Park in Wheatley, Oxfordshire, the third son of Brigadier General Alfred Douglas Miller and Ella Geraldine (née Fletcher). His mother was a descendant of political writer Andrew Fletcher, and of the Earls of Wemyss and March. His maternal great-grandfather Christopher Rice Mansel Talbot was Member of Parliament for Glamorgan for 60 years and Father of the House. His great-great grandfather was Richard Butler, 1st Earl of Glengall.

Miller grew up at Shotover Park, which had been purchased by his father in late 19th century. He was educated at Eton College, followed by the Royal Military College, Sandhurst.

== Career ==
=== Military service ===
On 26 January 1939, Miller was commissioned as a second lieutenant into the Welsh Guards, and was given the service number of 85599. He served with the British Expeditionary Force (BEF) after the outbreak of the Second World War that September. Serving with the regiment's 1st Battalion, part of the 32nd Guards Brigade of Major General Allan Adair's Guards Armoured Division, he was a courageous soldier who distinguished himself during the war, and was honoured for his bravery during and after the Allied invasion of Normandy in June 1944. He was awarded the Military Cross (MC) in December 1944, while serving as a major commanding a company in the 1st Battalion, Welsh Guards, with the citation noting, "that in the North Western Europe theatre of operations, after D-Day, in the face of heavy shelling, he kept his beleaguered men together, continually exposing himself to enemy fire, with complete disregard for his survival."

In March 1945, Miller was awarded the Distinguished Service Order for "re-establishing, again at great risk to himself, two companies of his regiment, scattered after a fierce enemy tank attack." Also same month, he commanded the first British troops to enter Brussels when it was liberated in September.

Followed the war, Miller served as aide-de-camp from 1945 to 1947 to Field Marshal Lord Wilson, head of the British Joint Staff Mission in Washington, D.C. From 1958 to 1961, Miller commanded the 1st Battalion, Welsh Guards.

=== Equestrian and crown equerry ===
Horses formed an integral part of Miller's childhood at the family estate, Shotover House, where he rode with the South Oxfordshire Hunt.

Miller was a contender to make the United Kingdom's equestrian eventing team for the 1952 Helsinki Olympics, but he suffered a fractured vertebra in a fall that prevented him from making the team. In 1972, he was a member of the first-place British team at the Equestrian World Driving Championships in Münster, where he also claimed an individual silver medal. He won a second gold medal with the British team at the 1974 World Championships in Frauenfeld, Switzerland.

In April 1961, Queen Elizabeth appointed Miller as Crown Equerry, a post he held for 26 years. As equerry, he took care of all of the Queen's horses, excluding her racehorses, and also looked after the fleet of royal cars. He was a key figure concerning all the coach and horses element of royal pageantry during his tenure, including Trooping the Colour, the opening of parliament, visits by foreign heads of state, royal weddings and the procession down the course at Royal Ascot. Miller led four royal wedding processions: those of Princess Alexandra of Kent to Angus Ogilvy in 1963, Princess Anne to Captain Mark Phillips in 1973, Prince Charles to Lady Diana Spencer in 1981 and Prince Andrew to Sarah Ferguson in 1986.

His expertise with horses rivalled that of the Queen herself, to whom he became both an adviser on all things horses and a loyal friend. During his tenure, he helped foster the royal family's interests in equine sports, including Prince Philip's competition and coach driving; Prince Charles' polo; and Princess Anne's equestrian career. The princess royal's eventing career began with the horse Purple Star, a foal among seven born to Stella, Miller's favourite mare. Miller helped oversee the princess's progress when she began riding Doublet, her partner in winning the 1971 European Eventing Championships.

In addition to his duties supervising the royal horses and motor transport from the Royal Mews, Miller worked to ensure that the Mews remained London's centre for equestrian life. The mews' indoor riding school was opened for disabled children and members of riding clubs, and equine societies and charities held meetings there.

Over the years, Miller served as president of many equine-relation organisations, including the British Show Jumping Association, the British Driving Society, the Coaching Club, the National Light Horse Breeding Society, the Horse Rangers Association, the Cleveland Bay Horse Society, and the Royal Windsor Horse Show Club.

He retired as crown equerry in August 1987, but remained an extra equerry to the Queen.

== Personal life ==
Miller was appointed a Commander of the Royal Victorian Order (CVO) in the 1966 Birthday Honours. He was knighted as a Knight Commander in the same order (KCVO) in 1974, and further honoured as Knight Grand Cross (GCVO) in 1987.

Miller never married. He died in Oxfordshire in 2006.

== Arms ==
Coat of arms of John Miller

Notes
Displayed on a stall plate at the Queen's Chapel of the Savoy.
Motto
Omne Bonum Superne
