= Shotover Park =

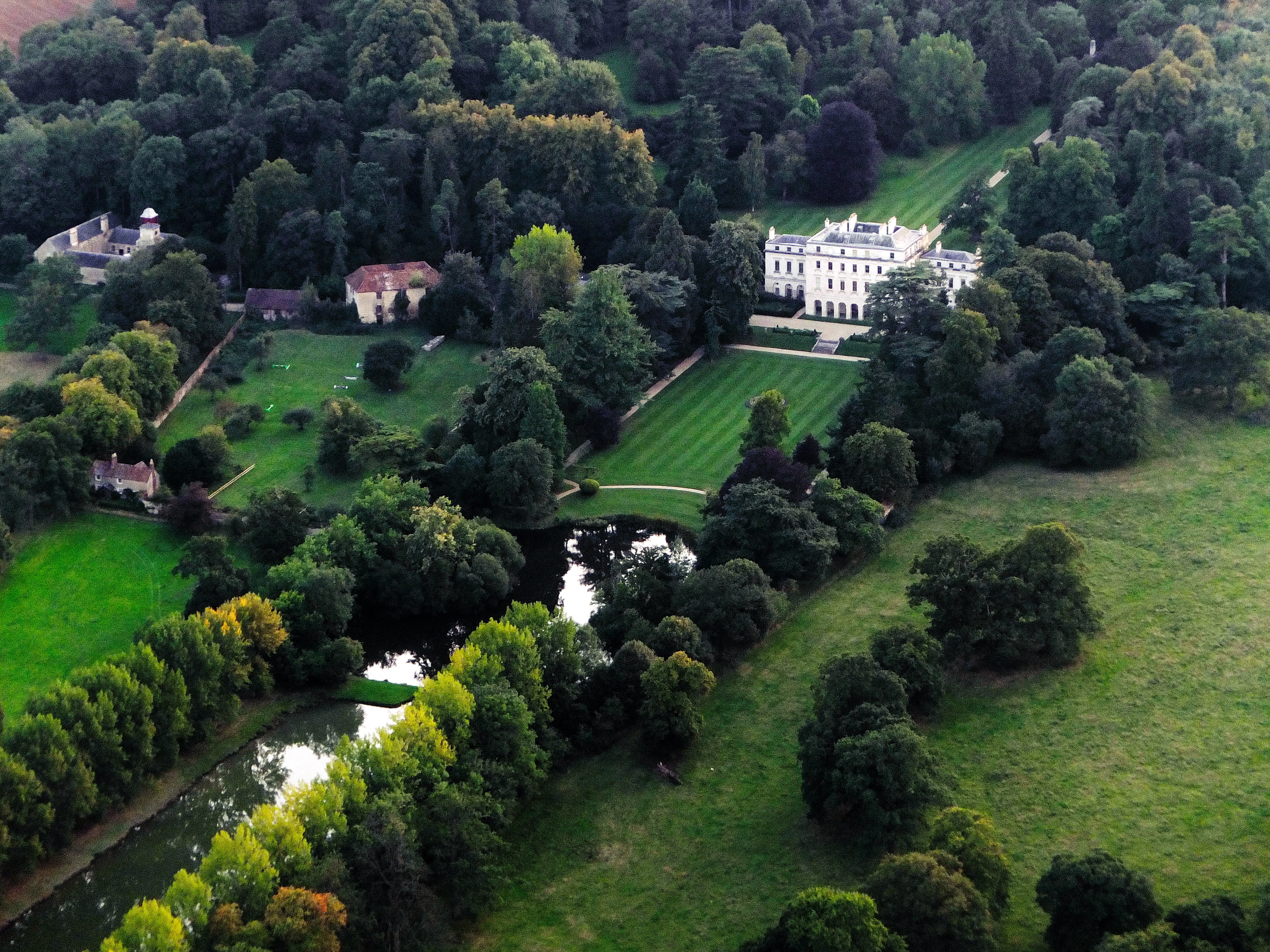
- Aerial view of Shotover Park, with the two large ponds in the foreground

- Location within Oxfordshire

General information
- Type: Country house
- Architectural style: Georgian
- Location: Wheatley, Oxfordshire
- Coordinates: 51.756071°N 1.155129°W
- Current tenants: Alexander James Sinnott Stanier
- Completed: c.1714–1720; 306 years ago
- Renovated: 1855; 171 years ago
- Client: James Tyrrell, Gen. James Tyrrell

Design and construction
- Architect: William Townsend (possibly)

Renovating team
- Architect: Joshua Sims

Listed Building – Grade I
- Designated: 18 July 1963
- Reference no.: 1284986

Shotover Park (also called Shotover House) is an 18th-century country house and park near Wheatley, Oxfordshire, England. The house, garden and parkland are Grade I-listed with English Heritage, and 18 additional structures on the property are also listed. Shotover House, its gardens, parkland, and the wider estate (known as Shotover Estate) are privately owned by the Shotover Trust. Shotover Park, which lies on the north and east slopes of Shotover hill, should not be confused with the more recently named Shotover Country Park, which is a public park and nature reserve on the southwest slopes of Shotover hill managed by Oxford City Council.

== Toponymy ==
The source of the name Shotover is uncertain. One suggestion is that it comes from Château Vert ("Green Castle"), a French Norman Royal hunting lodge on the site. Novelist Robert Graves was a proponent of this theory, mentioning it in his classic book A Wife for Mr Milton.

Another alternative is the Old English Scoet Ofer ("upper spur"). Shotover Hill is located 3 miles (4.8 km) to the east of Oxford, which rises to 557 feet (170 m) above sea level. In the Domesday Book of 1068, the location was identified as Scotorne. Up through the 13th century, patent rolls of King John and Henry III refer to Shotover variously as Scotore, Shotore, Shothore, and Shottovere.

== History ==
=== Shotover Lodge ===
The land encompassing Shotover Park was part of the Wychwood royal forest as far back as the Domesday Book. There was an "ancient" house on the site, celebrated as the location that Queen Elizabeth I selected for her reception to close her visit to Oxford in 1566. Oxford orator Roger Marbeck delivered a speech about Oxford University and the queen's valuable support for the university. The queen is recorded as saying upon her departure from Shotover, "Farewell the learned University of Oxford, farewell my good subjects there, farewell my dear scholars; and pray God prosper your studies."

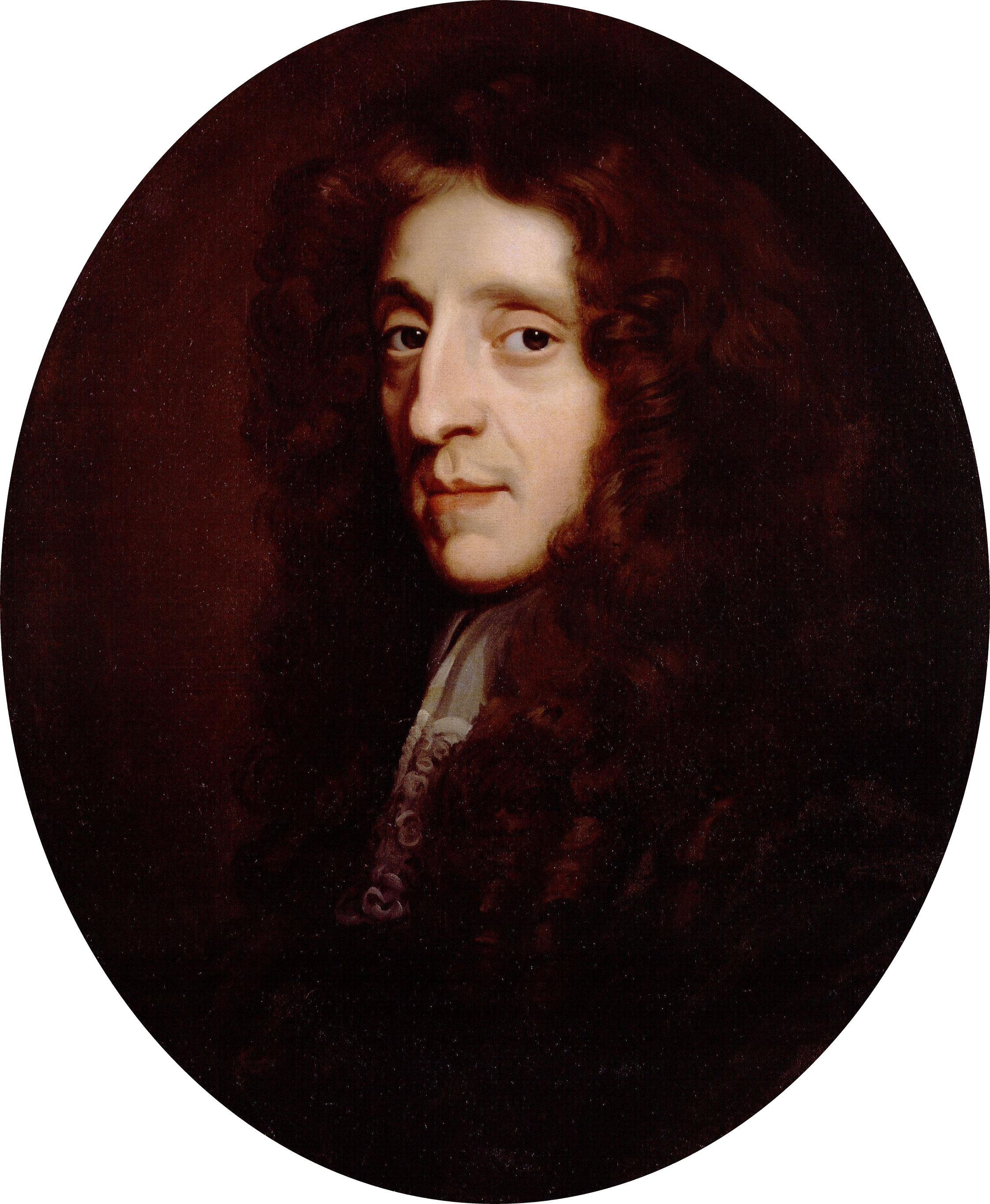
John Locke was a frequent visitor to Shotover in the late 1670s to the early 1680s, and he stored papers and books there for safekeeping when he was forced to flee to Holland in 1683.

Shotover came into the possession of the Tyrrell family after a freak hunting accident early in the 17th century. The story is that Timothy Tyrrell, Master of the Royal Buckhounds, was holding a dead stag for the teenaged Henry, Prince of Wales, eldest son of King James I. According to a chronicle of the unfortunate accident: "By his employment, [Tyrrell] held the Buck's head for the Prince to cut it off, in doing which His Highness cut the Master of the Buckhounds across the hand, which disabled him of the use of it forever." In compensation, the prince granted the rangership of the Forests of Shotover and Stow Wood to Tyrrell.

In 1613, following Prince Henry's death in 1612, King James confirmed the rangership by letters patent for the duration of the lives of Timothy Tyrrell and his two sons, Timothy (Master of the Buckhounds to King Charles I) and William. On 29 August 1624, King James knighted the elder Timothy Tyrrell at Shotover while attending a sporting hunt. He died in 1632.

Originally from Oakley, Buckinghamshire, the Tyrrell family grew extremely powerful in the 17th century. The royal forest in Oxfordshire extended over Headington, Marston, and parts of 10 other parishes. However, ongoing fighting among the local population, as well as trees felled by the Royalists during the English Civil War, caused the forest to fall into such disarray that in 1660 the woodland was disafforested – no longer subject to royal forest laws.

The Tyrrells lived in a house known as Shotover Lodge or Shotover House, although it is unknown if it was the same house visited by Queen Elizabeth or a different building. Historian and political theorist James Tyrrell, grandson of Sir Timothy the elder, grew up at Shotover before moving to Oakley in 1670 after his marriage. Tyrrell divided his time between Oakley and Shotover. Tyrrell was a close friend of John Locke, whom he met at Oxford in 1658. Locke was a frequent guest at Shotover in the late 1670s and early 1680s, and he stored papers and books there for safekeeping when he was forced to flee to Holland in 1683. Tyrrell eventually sold Oakley and moved back to Shotover after James II forced him out of local governance in Buckinghamshire for refusing to sign the Declaration of Indulgence in 1687.

=== Shotover Park ===
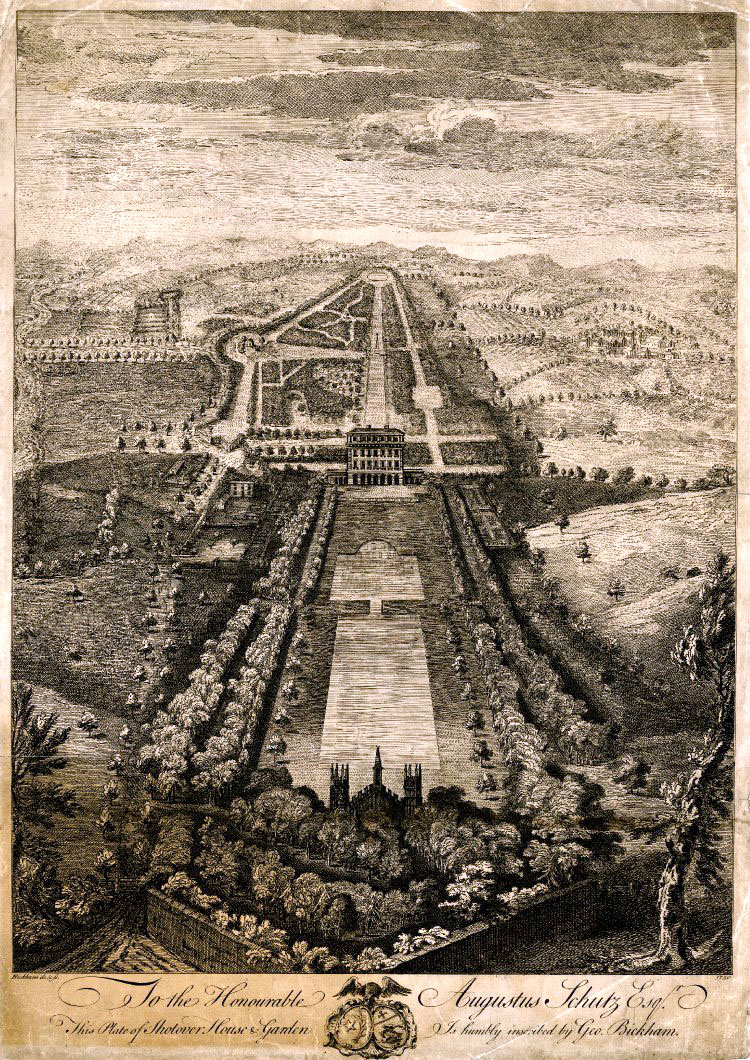
Shotover engraving by George Bickham the Younger, 1750, showing the house prior to the additional wings added in the 1850s expansion

Sir Timothy the younger died in 1701. The construction of the current Shotover Park began circa 1714–15 under his son James, and was located approximately 200 metres (660 ft) east of the site of the house visited by Queen Elizabeth. In 1717–18, he built a Gothic temple at Shotover. The temple, with corner turrets, arcaded loggia, and battlemented gable, is possibly the first intimation of the Gothic Revival architecture in England. James died the following year and the construction of the building was continued under his son, Lieutenant-General James Tyrrell, an Army officer and MP.

The architect of the new house commissioned by Sir Timothy is uncertain, but Shotover Park is believed to have been designed by William Townsend (or Townesend; 1676–1739), an Oxford architect and mason who worked on many buildings at Oxford University, and who was the son of Mayor of Oxford John Townesend. Sir Nikolaus Pevsner wrote in the Oxfordshire edition of his Buildings of England series that Shotover Park has strong similarities with The Queen's College, Oxford, linking it to Townsend. Construction was likely completed by 1720; the date 1718 does appear on rainwater heads. The design of the elder James Tyrrell's Gothic temple has been attributed to Townsend or to James Gibbs.

Shotover Park was constructed of colour-washed limestone ashlar with a roof made of Westmorland and Welsh slate with stone stacks. The house is built to a double-depth plan, consisting of two storeys, plus a basement and attics. The initial house featured a seven-window front. In 1855, it was extended to 15-windows with two wings added on either side in a renovation by Joshua Sims. The Ionic pedimented porch, the arched front doorway and flanking arched windows are likely from the mid-19th century additions. The windows on the ground and first floors feature floating cornices, moulded architraves and sills supported on consoles.

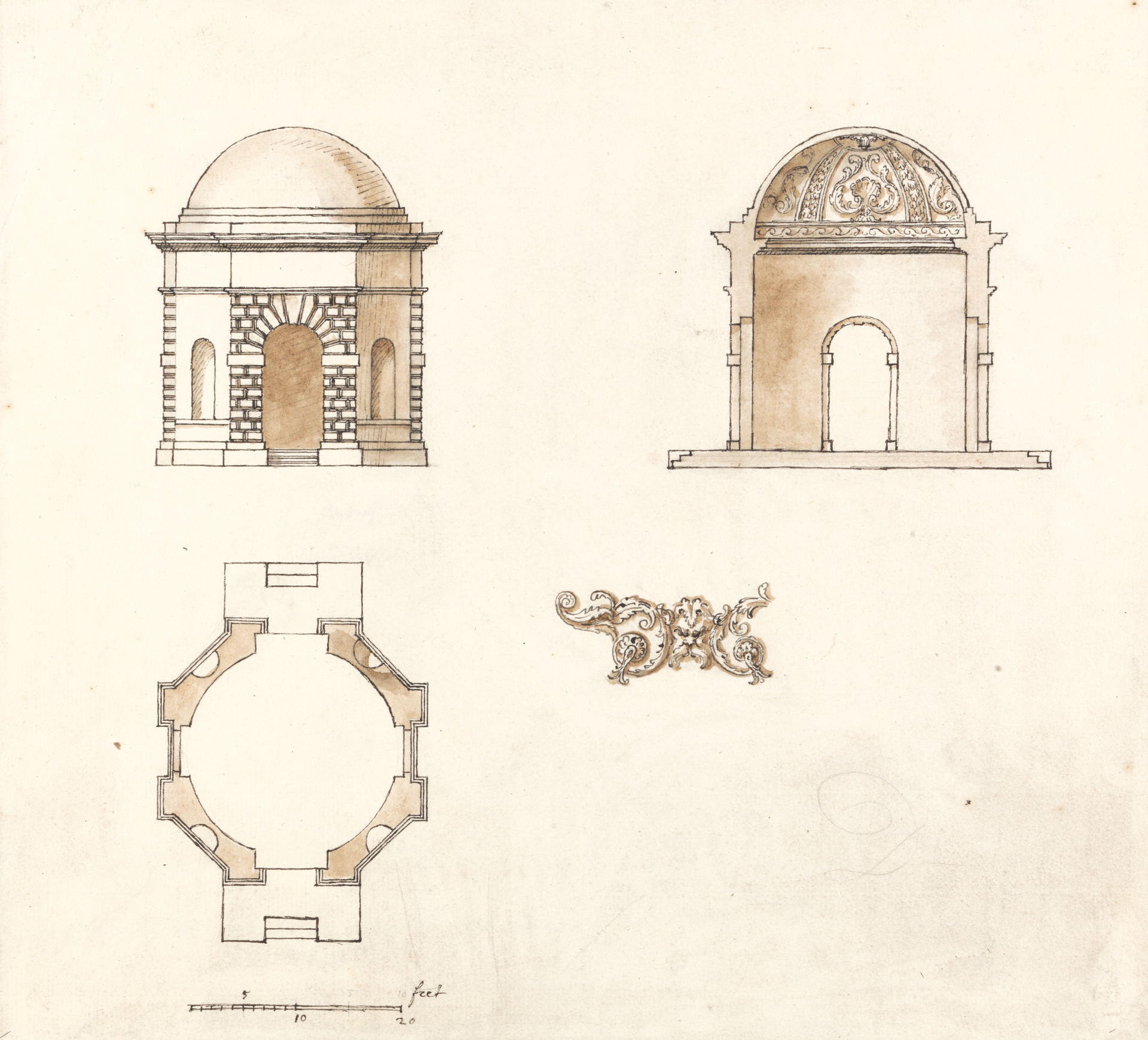
Octagon temple designed by William Kent, circa 1735

Early outbuildings and features at Shotover Park included three stables, a coach house, a granary, a barn, dairy, work house, a brewhouse, gardener's cottage, several gardens and nurseries with young trees, and six small fishponds. The formal garden on the site dates to 1718, which includes a Grade I-listed walled kitchen garden.

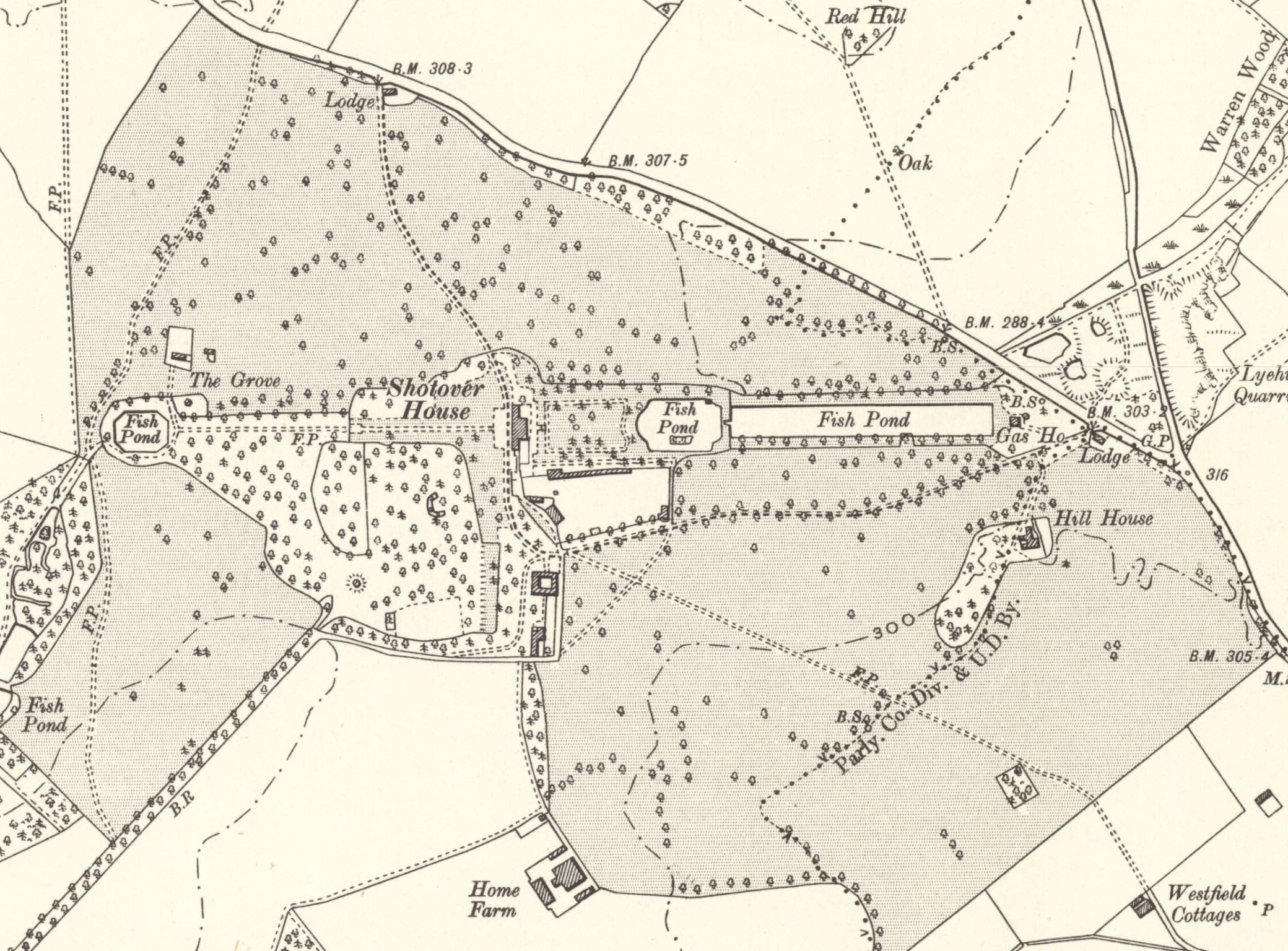
Map of Shotover from the Ordnance Survey Great Britain County Series, 1898

In addition to the Gothic temple built for Sir Timothy, the garden includes a large obelisk and another temple designed by William Kent circa 1735. The obelisk was built to honour the visit of Queen Elizabeth and stands on the site of the ancient house she visited. The Kent temple was badly damaged in the 1980s by falling trees, but it was restored in 1988 with assistance from the Historic Buildings and Monuments Commission.

James Tyrrell died in 1742 and left the estate to the family of his friend, the Baron Augustus Schütz, a Hanoverian favourite of King George I, who became Master of the Robes to King George II. It passed to his son, George Frederick Schutz, who was Groom of the Bedchamber to King George III, and in turn to his son, Thomas James Schutz.

When Thomas died, Shotover Park passed into the hands of the Drury family through his youngest sister Mary, who married Sir George Vandeput, 2nd Baronet. They left only one heir, a daughter Frances, who married Richard Vere Drury. Shotover passed to their son, George Vandeput Drury, who died without an heir in November 1849.

In 1850, George Gammie (later Gammie-Maitland) bought Shotover, reportedly with the proceeds of the sale of property he owned in Australia. (His business partner, William Gilbert Rees, named Shotover River in New Zealand for Gammie.) Gammie-Maitland went bankrupt in 1871, when the estate was sold to Colonel James Miller. It stayed in the Miller family until 2006, owned by Alfred Douglas Miller and his son Sir John Miller, Crown Equerry and friend of Queen Elizabeth II. The royal family were frequent visitors to the estate; Princess Anne suffered a broken nose falling off a horse while riding at Shotover at age 15.

== Today ==
Shotover Park has been held in a trust since 1964. More recent residents of the house include Major Alexander Alfred Miller (known as Alastair) and later his youngest brother Sir John Miller. Their nephew, Sir Beville Stanier, 3rd Baronet, is one of the trustees and his son, Alexander James Sinnott Stanier, now lives in the house. The park and estate cover 1,767 acres (715 ha).

== Gallery ==
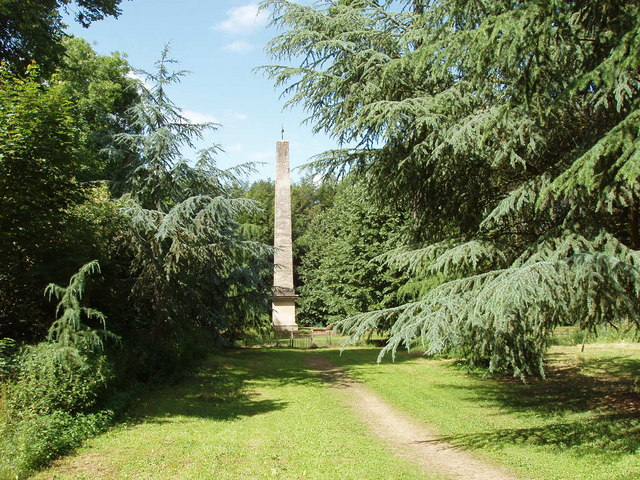
Obelisk, designed by William Kent, circa 1735

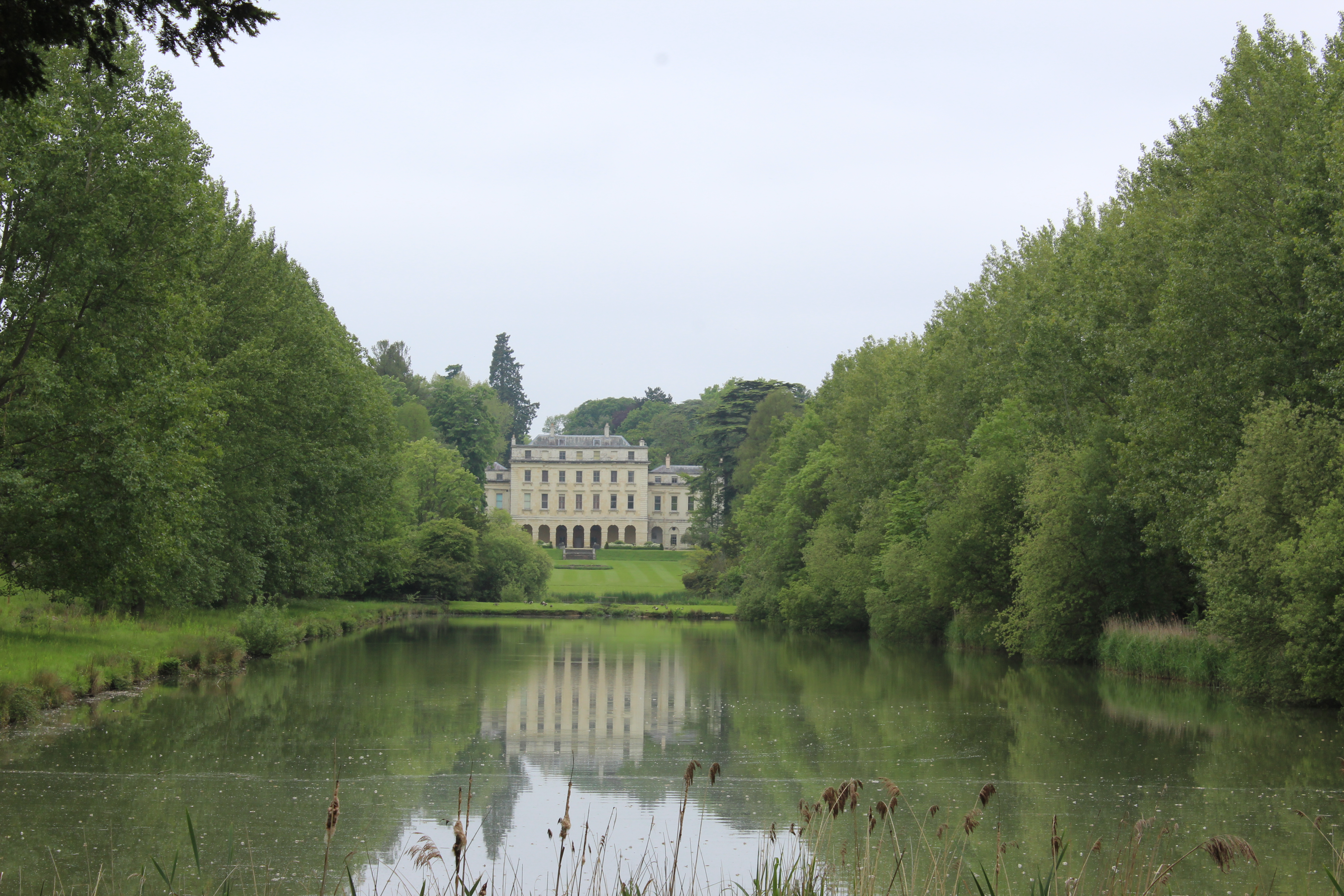
Shotover Park and pond

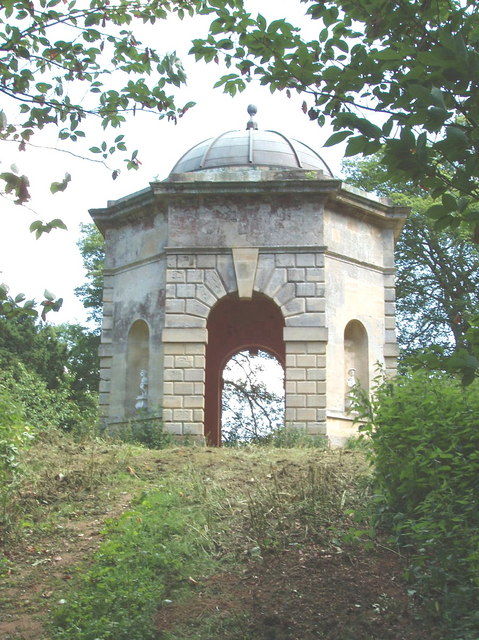
Octagonal temple, designed by Kent

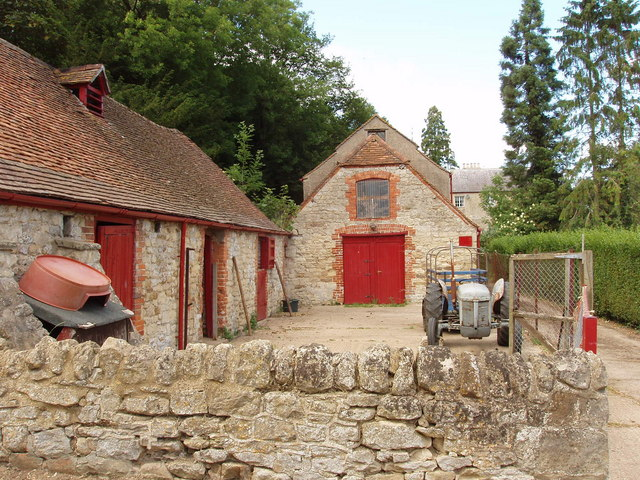
Outbuildings, with main house in the background

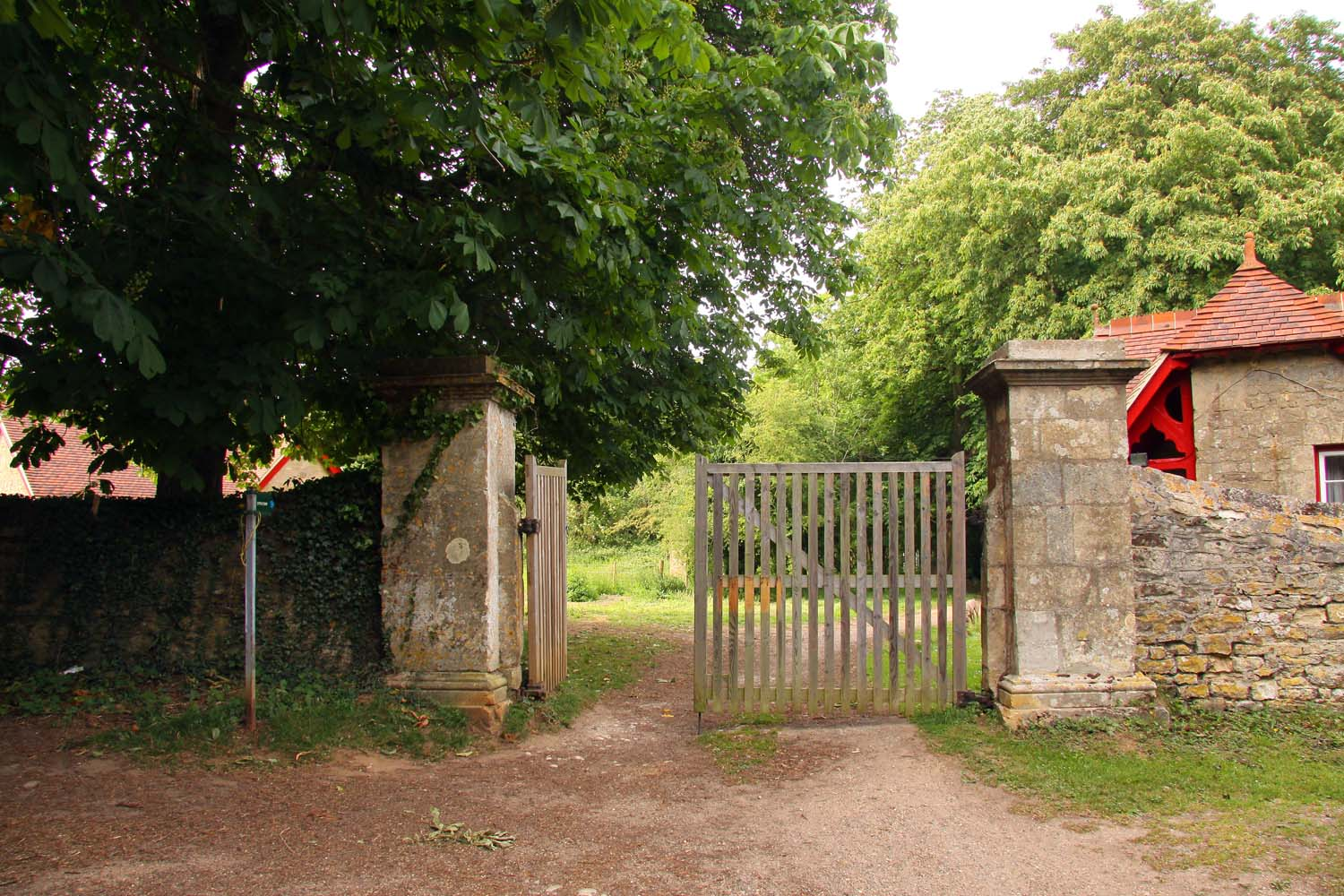
Gated entrance to Shotover Park

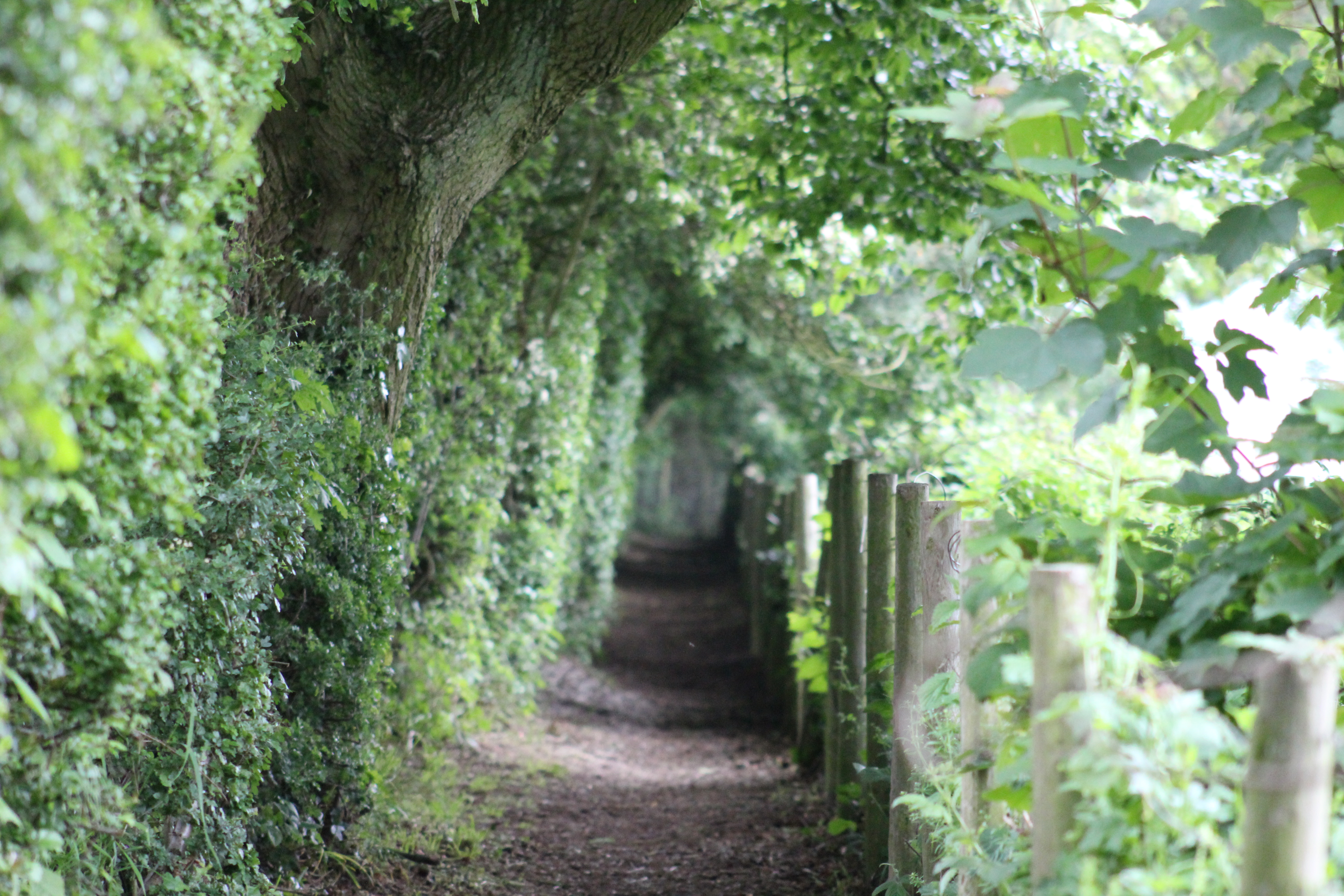
Natural archway

== Listed buildings ==
- Grade I: Shotover Park
- Grade I: Shotover park and garden
- Grade II*: Gothic Temple
- Grade II*: Obelisk
- Grade II*: Octagonal Temple
- Grade II: Oxford Gate
- Grade II: Oxford Lodge
- Grade II: Eastern Pier of Gateway
- Grade II: Home Farm, South Range
- Grade II: Home Farm, Central Range
- Grade II: Dovecote
- Grade II: Stables
- Grade II: Steps
- Grade II: Garden Seat
- Grade II: The Grove
- Grade II: Garden Walls and Gardener's Cottage
- Grade II: Ornamental Wellhead
- Grade II: Western Pier of Gateway
- Grade II: Stable Court

== See also ==
- Grade I listed buildings in South Oxfordshire
