= Anthony Hussey =

Member of the Parliament of England

Judge of the Admiralty Court of England and Wales
- In office 1542–1549
- Nominated by: Lord High Admiral of England
- Appointed by: Henry VIII
- Preceded by: John Tregonwell
- Succeeded by: Richard Lyell

Personal details
- Born: c. 1496 London
- Died: 1560 London
- Resting place: St Martin, Ludgate
- Spouse: Catherine Webbe

Anthony Hussey (also written Huse, Hussie, etc.; c. 1496 – 1560) was an English merchant and lawyer who was President Judge of the High Court of Admiralty under King Henry VIII, before becoming Principal Registrar to the Archbishops of Canterbury from early in the term of Thomas Cranmer, through the restored Catholic primacy of Reginald Pole, and into the first months of Matthew Parker's incumbency, taking a formal part in the latter's consecration. The official registers of these leading figures of the English Reformation period were compiled by him. While sustaining this role, with that of Proctor of the Court of the Arches and other related ecclesiastical offices as a Notary public, he acted abroad as agent and factor for Nicholas Wotton (Dean of Canterbury and royal ambassador to the Emperor).

During the reign of Queen Mary I he sat twice in her parliaments, in 1553 and 1558. Having promoted the first expedition of the Company of Merchant Adventurers to New Lands (the "Muscovy Company") during the time of Edward VI, in Mary's Charter of 1554/55 he was named one of the original four Consuls of the company, and in 1556 succeeded Sebastian Cabot as the company's governor. He was also simultaneously Crown Agent and Governor of the English Merchants Adventurers in Antwerp from 1556 to 1558. His long witness of the Reformation came to completion in his official role in the electing and consecration of Matthew Parker as the first Reformist Archbishop of the Elizabethan religious settlement.

== Early life ==
Hussey was born in London in either 1496 or 1497, the son of John Hussey of Slinfold in West Sussex. He had a sister named Margaret, probably somewhat younger than him. He was the nephew of Henry Hussey, MP (died 1541/44), and cousin of Sir Henry Hussey, MP (died 1557) of Slinfold. Confirming this identity, Anthony Hussey, Esquire, is named in the wills of Sir Henry (proved 1557) and of Henry's widow Dame Bridget (1558) (daughter of Sir Thomas Spring of Lavenham, Suffolk), in both cases as overseer, and Anthony's sons Laurence and William Hussey are also mentioned. Anthony may have attended Oxford University but, if so, he left no record of having obtained an academic degree there. Nonetheless, in 1525 he obtained the position of Notary public to the Diocese of London.

=== Marriage ===
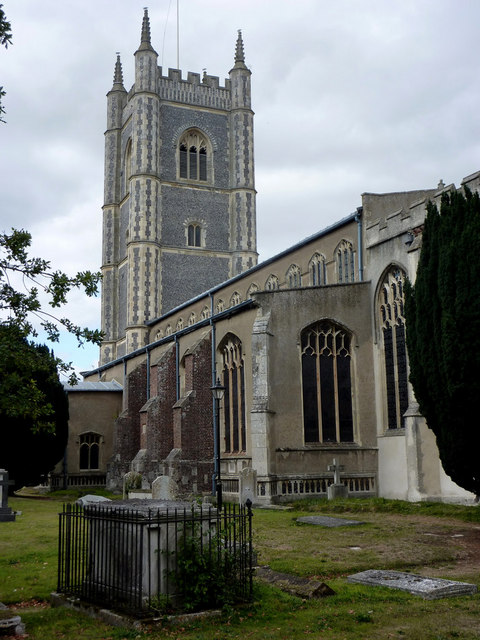
St Mary's church, Dedham, Essex

By 1526 Anthony Hussey married Katharine, daughter of John Webbe (died 1523) and his wife Joan Morse, of Dedham, on the northern border of Essex. John Webbe and his father Thomas were wealthy armigerous clothier merchants responsible for important work in the church at Dedham, including the splendid tower, and the substantial altar tomb raised by John for his father, who died in 1506. Dedham's cloth industry, traded into the ports of the Baltic a hundred years previously, had brought prosperity, but this declined after the middle of the fifteenth century. Katharine brought to the marriage lands at Abbot's Hall, Dedham (in the Stour valley, which issues at Harwich), and at Stanford-le-Hope (in southern Essex, beside Tilbury on the Thames). It was a lifelong marriage, by which they had three sons and a daughter. In July 1524 Edward Morce obtained licence to found a chantry at the altar of St Mary of Piety in Dedham church, for the good estate of the King and Queen Katherine, and for Thomas, Cardinal of York, and for the soul of John Webbe of Dedham, and to endow it with lands to the annual value of nine pounds.

Katharine Hussey's mother (Joan Webbe) held the small manor of Faites and Wades, in Dedham, Ardleigh and Lawford, between 1529 and 1537, though she lived for many years after, making her will in 1564. This was directly adjacent to Langham, Essex, where the manor of Langham Hall (sometimes called "Dedham Hall"), an hereditament of the Earls of Suffolk, belonged successively to Queen Katherine of Aragon and Queen Jane Seymour, and then to Charles Brandon until 1538. From 1541 to 1557 it was held by Anne of Cleves in acknowledgement of her acquiescence in her separation from the King.

=== Wolsey's monasteries ===
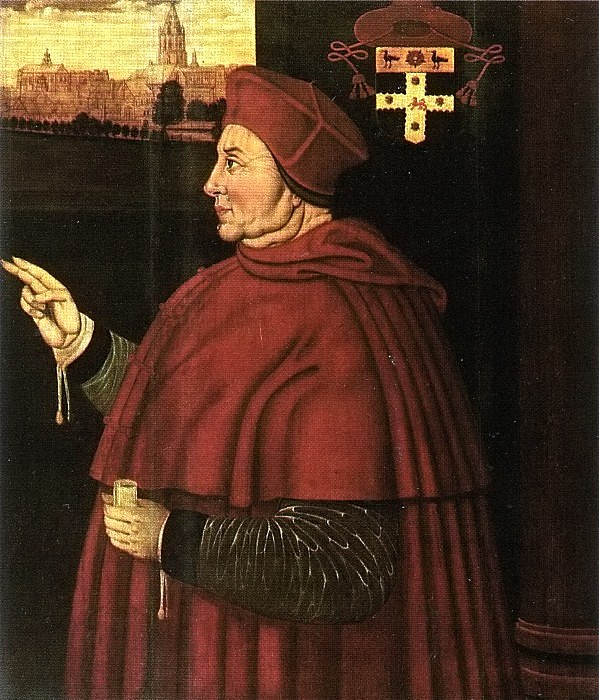
Cardinal Archbishop Thomas Wolsey

In the first months of 1524/25 Hussey was with Thomas Cromwell and John Alen as three notaries public assisting John Alen LL.D., (Canon of Lincoln), commissary to Cardinal Thomas Wolsey in Wolsey's early suppression of some of the smaller monasteries, including Blackmore Priory, Daventry Priory, Dodnash Priory, Little Horkesley Priory, Littlemore Priory, Snape Priory, Thoby Priory, Tiptree Priory, Wallingford Priory and Wix Priory. These closures, made under Wolsey's legatine powers, were the source of the income which he amassed to found Cardinal College in Oxford and The King's School, Ipswich. In 1530, at the time of Wolsey's fall, Hussey was one of sixteen men (including eight bishops and seven clergymen, beside himself) indicted for breaching laws against advocating Papal supremacy over the English church, for having abetted Wolsey in his role as Papal legate. These charges were pursued against them until Easter term of 1531, when the General Pardon released them from the proceedings.

He was called as a notary to Bishop John Stokesley's degradation of Richard Bayfield in St Paul's in November 1531. Hussey's career subsequently followed paths of advancement in both ecclesiastical and mercantile/maritime law. In 1533 he, with certain London merchants, was granted the next right of presentation (advowson) to the benefice of Bradninch in Devon.

== Notary, Proctor, Registrar, Judge ==
After the records of the University of Cambridge had been detained from the university by Thomas Cromwell for a year (as it is said, "to wean them from their former Fondnesse to the Pope"), they were collected from London by the junior Proctor and the Beadle: the Regent House (the university's governing body) then deputed Anthony Hussey and Thomas Argall to receive such records as concerned the university. Early in the archiepiscopate of Thomas Cranmer, Hussey was appointed registrar to the ecclesiastical court of the Archbishop of Canterbury, under the immediate direction of Dr Richard Gwent, the Archbishop's Commissary. Gwent, it appears, was appointed before Cranmer's induction and witnessed his private protestation, probably at Thomas Cromwell's instance. Hussey's place in Cranmer's official surroundings was similarly purposed. His name is associated with various Lambeth records of 1537, when he was apparently acting as First Clerk of the Faculty Office, and he was appointed successor to William Pottkyn as Principal Registrar in 1538.

The royal commission of February 1538 issued to Richard Ingworth to visit friaries (intending closures) prompted many houses to begin alienating their property before they were visited. To prevent this, in May another commission was issued enabling Ingworth to confiscate the friary seals as he went, and to make inventories in duplicate. To do this Ingworth needed second copies of the commissions themselves, and Cranmer's own team produced them. In July 1538 John Cockes received the originals at St Paul's and requested Anthony Hussey as principal registrar to publish them as public instruments. This was no doubt done with Cranmer's full approval, and reveals Cranmer's more active participation in the infrastructure of the Visitation than is sometimes attributed to him. In November 1539 Cranmer wrote to Cromwell about his investigations in Calais, "all such examinations, inquisitions and other such writings as I have concerning any matters of Calyce, be in the hands and custody of my register, Antony Hussey, unto whom I have direct my letters, that he shall with all expedition repair unto your lordship with all such writings as he hath concerning the said matters."

=== Convocation of 1540 ===
As Notary Public, Hussey read out the King's commissary letters for the annulment of his marriage to Anne of Cleves before the Convocation at Westminster in July 1540: On the same day, as "Principal Register of the Archbishop of Canterbury" he, with the King's Registrar and the King's Prothonotary, witnessed the oaths and testimonies of the noble, venerable and eminent witnesses given before the senior clergy at Westminster (and also that of Philip Hoby separately given).

On the next day all the Notaries were assembled at Westminster, together with four other Doctors of Law (including John Tregonwell), to witness all the Archbishops, Bishops and clergymen debate the depositions. Their conclusion was that the King's marriage to Anne of Cleves had been invalid, a pretended matrimony which did not bind either party but left them both free to marry whom they pleased. The two Archbishops with four bishops then sat down with all the notaries to perfect the letters testimonial or certificatory in the best way possible, which was accordingly prepared and witnessed by all and sealed by both Archbishops for presentation to the King. Hussey and Thomas Argall then notarized the Letters of Consent of Queen Anne, and the depositions taken in further proceedings at Hampton Court and Parlande Park on 29 July.

=== Consolidating roles ===
The execution of Cromwell in 1540 gave fresh meaning to official placements. John Darnall, Clerk (future Baron) of the King's Exchequer, called Master Anthony Hussey "my frende" in his will written in late July 1540. In 1542 Hussey acquired additional duties as Proctor of the Court of Arches, which at that time was still under the authority of Dr Gwent as Dean of the Arches until his death in 1543, when John Cockes succeeded him. In that year the restless enmity of Stephen Gardiner reached out through his creatures, the Prebendaries of Kent, to direct the charge of heresy against Cranmer.

The King responded by placing Cranmer in charge of a commission to investigate the accusations against him, and to appoint assistants of his own choosing. He chose his own officials, Anthony Hussey ("his publike scribe and messenger"), Dr John Cockes his chancellor, and Dr Anthony Bellasis, who all went to Canterbury to make their investigations. According to Ralph Morice's Anecdotes, Hussey and Cockes were "such fautours [i.e. favourers] of the papistes, that nothing wolde be disclosid and espied, but every thing colorablie was hidd". But (despite that surprising imputation) progress was made, including the temporary imprisonment of three of Cranmer's six preachers, and with the effective intervention of Dr Thomas Legh matters were laid open, and the King perceived the malice of the accusers.

From 1546 Hussey was also Registrar to the Dean of St Paul's, where Dean Incent's death in 1545 had removed an important presence sympathetic to Cromwell's policy, though succeeded by William May, also a vigorous reformer. Both as Proctor of the Arches and Registrar to the Dean of St Paul's, Hussey continued active until the end of 1555.

=== The Admiralty Court, 1536-47 ===
In 1536 Hussey also began to sit as a judge deputy in the Court of Admiralty, where John Tregonwell (died 1565) had been the principal judge since 1524. Anthony Hussey was a proctor in the Court until the time of his becoming a judge, and in 1537 both men are described as judges of the Admiralty. Hussey was called "President" of the Court in 1538, among other descriptors. Tregonwell was also a Master in Chancery, and in 1541 became Chancellor of Wells Cathedral for the term of a year. During that time Hussey was his deputy, until Tregonwell's re-appointment in 1542. (At a personal level, it was a lifelong association: in his will dated 12 January 1557/58, Hussey left a ring "to my good friend Sir John Tregonwell, Knight".) Hussey continued in this Admiralty office until at least 1547, after which his involvement with it led into troubled waters.

In May 1544 Stephen Vaughan, then royal agent and Governor of the English Merchant Adventurers in Flanders, wrote to William Paget concerning an instruction from Nicholas Wotton (Dean of Canterbury, and royal ambassador to the Emperor) to "Mr Hussey" to pay to Vaughan £244.10s. delivered to him at "Spire" (seat of the 1529 Protestation), which had been taken up on credit in Frankfurt. This is further explained where in March 1545 Anthony Hussey, factor and agent to Nicholas Wotton, acknowledges receipt of £336 from Sir John Williams, Treasurer of the Court of Augmentations, in respect of Wotton's diets from 11 February to 28 July 1545. Wotton kept his position as Dean of Canterbury until his death in 1567, and was one of Hussey's most constant associates.

Vaughan (who died in 1549) held the Governorship until 1545, when, being required in London in connection with the Mint, he was succeeded by Thomas Chamberlain (the diplomat), and by William Dansell in 1551. However, Vaughan's brother-in-law Thomas Lodge, who maintained communications with the Privy Council, remained active in Antwerp and became an important associate (and ultimately an executor) of Hussey's. The Governorship, to which Hussey himself came a decade later, required legal expertise in presiding over the courts at the marts, and in representing English merchants in their lawsuits in Antwerp and Brussels and in their dealings with the English authorities.

=== The King's service ===
The formation of the Council of the Marine Causes, prompted apparently by the death of William Gonson in 1544 and the consequent need to formalize the naval command, produced (among others) the appointments of Robert Legge, Treasurer of His Majesty's Marine Causes, and Benjamin Gonson (William's son) as Surveyor and Rigger of the Navy. Legge's tenure was brief, as he made his will in October 1548 appointing Anthony Hussey his sole executor, and binding him to perform the will truly under supervision of Oliver St John, Master of the King's Household. He made sundry gifts to officers of the Admiralty and many charitable bequests. Days later he added a Codicil associating Benjamin Gonson as co-executor, calling Hussey and Gonson his "most derest and faithfull frendes", but stipulating that Hussey alone should first see Legge's account to the King passed, tried, allowed and discharged in law, before Gonson should assist him in any way. The will reached probate on 28 October 1550, both swearing to administer.

Benjamin Gonson succeeded to Legge's office in 1549 and held it for life, and Admiral William Wynter succeeded him as Surveyor. Gonson also married Ursula Hussey, Anthony's daughter, by whom he had many children. Her first husband Michael Roberts of Neasden, dying in 1544, made Ursula and his father-in-law Anthony his co-executors, and left to Ursula a substantial inheritance of properties including his mansion at Willesden. Overseers were his uncle John Sadler, Alderman, and Thomas Godman, husband of Hussey's sister Margaret.

The conclusion of Wotton's diets in July 1545 coincided closely with a summons for Ant. Hussey to appear before the Privy Council (apparently for refusal to discharge an order of the council concerning restitution of goods), to appear by 4 August. If this refers to the same man, on 28 July he submitted to them a survey of ships in the Thames thought to be in readiness to serve the King. On 29 July he was concerned with the transportation of 1000 men from London to Boulogne, for which he later received £100 from the Augmentations. In the same year Ant. Hussey and Thomas Darrell received annuities out of Leeds Priory. A letter from the Viscount Lisle (John Dudley) to William Paget of 7 August 1545, which includes a recommendation that Anthonye Hussye should captain the Small Gallye, speaks of him as "the gentleman that was one of the Roodes and made means to serve the king", adding that he is "called a very hardy man and one that hath been brought up in the feat of the sea." Lisle requires a letter under the King's stamp to deliver to Hussey at his coming.

== Edward VI: Reform ==
=== Cranmer's Register ===
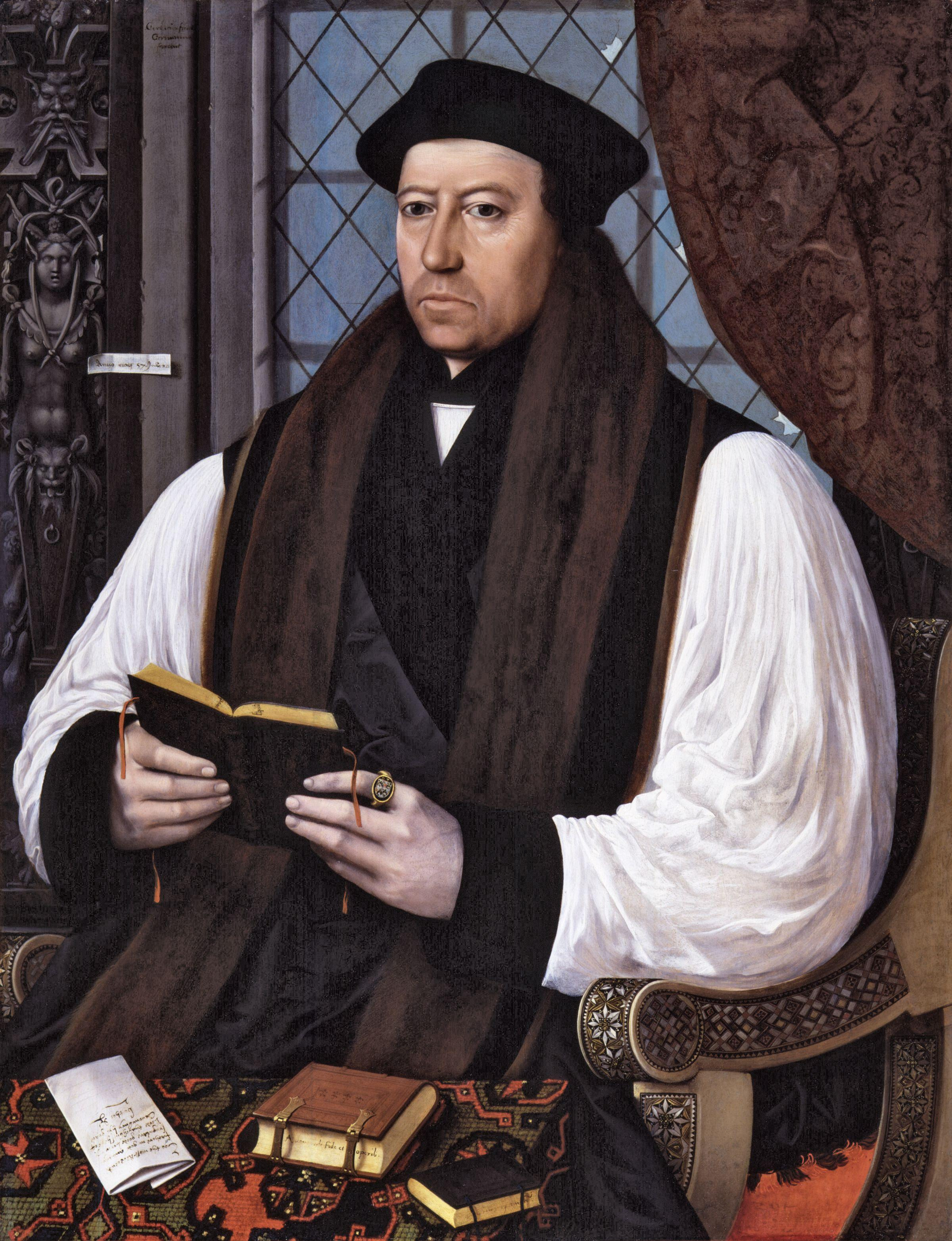
Thomas Cranmer

During the reign of King Edward VI and his regents, Hussey remained Registrar to Archbishop Cranmer through the years in which the reformed doctrines flowed into the English church and universities, the institutions were detached from their superstitious uses, the Book of Common Prayer and the Articles of the Reformed faith were promulgated, new English liturgies devised and implemented for the consecration of reformed bishops, Gardiner and Bonner removed from authority, and the ritualistic paraphernalia dispersed.

As Registrar, Hussey supervised the contents of Cranmer's archiepiscopal register, which he was careful to preserve after his master's death, and which Diarmaid MacCulloch has called "a central witness to the entire early Reformation". The register is organized in sections, opening with matter relating to the Boleyn divorce and Cranmer's own consecration, then royal writs for the Convocations, Memoranda of commissions and letters mainly concerning the Act of Supremacy (1534), Visitations, Heresy trials under royal commission, and other similar headings, rounding off with almost 90 folios of institutions and collations, and notes on clerks claiming benefit of clergy, 1538–1551.

After the fall of Somerset and the deprivation of Bonner, Cranmer was able to translate Nicholas Ridley to the bishopric of London, and to place John Ponet in Ridley's former bishopric of Rochester. With these and other deprivations, the Reform needed to sustain canonical procedures for its future legitimacy. It is stated that all the records of consecrations of bishops, which appear between fols. 321 and 334, were entered in Cranmer's register by Anthony Hussey. At the consecration of Ponet (which took place at Lambeth Palace on 29 June 1550) Cranmer decreed that he would write to the Archdeacon of Canterbury concerning the "investiture, installation and inthronization" of the bishop as was customary. The notarial presence included "Anthony Huse, Principal Register of the Archbishop", and Peter Lilly, John Lewis and John Incent, notaries public. On 8 March 1551 John Hooper was consecrated Bishop of Gloucester in the same way, and records, Acts and Mandates, of the consecrations of John Scory (April 1551), Myles Coverdale (August 1551), John Taylor (1552) and of John Harley (May 1553) follow.

Hussey's colleague Dr Anthony Bellasis, Prebendary of Westminster, died in autumn 1552 leaving to him his best gelding furnished with new bridle and saddle. Thomas Argall, uncle of the testator, was one of his executors: to Mrs Argall and to Mrs Hussey he left an old ryall each, and "to Mr Hussy's two sonnes twentie poundes betwene them". Nicholas Wotton (who received a bequest of plate) and Anthony Hussey were to be his overseers.

=== Horizons ===
Lawrence and William, the two sons of Anthony Hussey of whom anything is known, studied together in Padua in north Italy. They were tutored by Hugh Turnbull, a religious traditionalist of Corpus Christi College, Oxford, who had been lecturer of logic in that university before matriculating at Louvain in 1547, probably as a Catholic Edwardian exile. Laurence and William Hussey witnessed his doctoral examinations in theology at Padua, and those of George Dudgeon, in 1550, and Lawrence afterwards obtained his own doctorate in Civil Law in Bologna. Dudgeon and Turnbull refused to take an oath of allegiance to the Pope, for fear of the danger they would incur in England if they did so. The Hussey brothers received a letter from Roger Ascham while in Padua: they appear to have left later in 1550, William being described as "Consiliarius" (advisor) to the English nation in 1551–1552.

Early in Edward's reign, Hussey was put under notice of scrutiny by the Lord Protector Somerset, who accused him of injustice through slackness, at least in part concerning a judgement made in the Court of Admiralty. The Lord Admiral Seymour stood to his defence, but the Protector gave Hussey warning to be strictly upright in his proceedings, or he would be held to account for it. He is still found at the Admiralty Court in 1548, but appears to have been replaced in 1549. Hussey was one of a group of owners of the ship Anthony, which was engaged in trade between Antwerp and London. In 1552, in respect of a cargo of sugar being brought from Antwerp, a case for negligence was brought before an Admiralty justice against the ship's owners and was upheld against them.

=== The Stillyard and the Adventurers ===
The Company of the German or Hanseatic Merchants, which by ancient privileges had their London operation out of their Kontor, the Stillyard or Easterlings Hall in Thames Street, had, in recent increments, by 1552 engrossed much of the woollen trade in England. By their monopoly they had in the foregoing year exported some 44,000 pieces of cloth, in prejudice to the English, who had exported barely 1100. The Merchant Adventurers could not survive this unless the monopoly was broken, and made a complaint, to which the Stillyard men made answer, and the Adventurers replied. This fracture with the Stillyard was fomented by Sir Thomas Gresham and the Duke of Northumberland.

On 23 February 1551/52 the council decreed that the German merchants, whose name, number and nation were unknown, were not a properly constituted Company, and by certain practises had forfeited their Liberties: the contract was therefore broken, and they must trade with England on the same terms as other foreigners. Heavy duties were laid upon their goods, whether imported or exported. Despite immediate representations by ambassadors from Hamburg and Lübeck, the former decree was confirmed and the monopoly was broken, though the trade continued. King Edward himself drew up a paper concerning a Free Mart in England, identifying Southampton and Hull as suitable centres and considering methods for implementation.

As new opportunities immediately arose, Hussey, with many other investors, became involved in the project advanced by Sebastian Cabot to send an expedition in search of a Northeast Passage or northern sea route to Cathay. The voyage led by Sir Hugh Willoughby, Stephen Borough and Richard Chancellor which departed in April 1553 had been sponsored by "certain grave citizens of London... resolved upon a new and strange Navigation," paying £25 apiece for membership. "They first made choyse of certain grave and wise persons in maner of a Senate, or companie, which should lay their heads together and give their judgements" (etc.). Henry Lane, writing in later years to William Sanderson, made Andrew Judde, William Garrard, George Barne and Anthony Hussey the principal sponsors of the 1553 expedition. Edward VI intended a charter of incorporation for this Company under Sebastian Cabot as its governor, but the young king died not long after the expedition set off, and before his charter could be sealed.

== Queen Mary's reign ==
=== The reform reversed ===
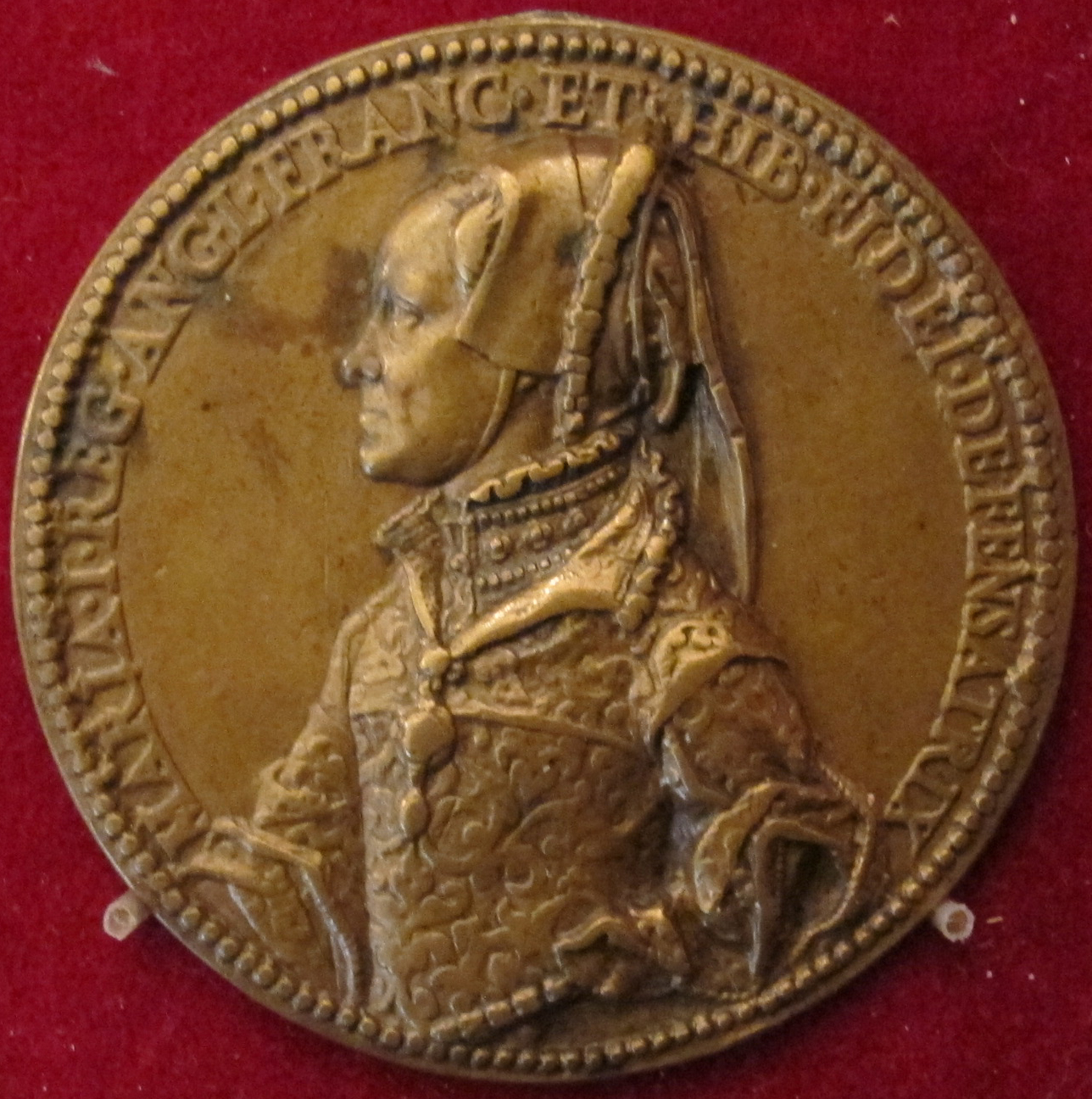
Queen Mary, 1554

Following the proclamation of Queen Mary (19 July 1553) and the city's submission to her authority, Bishop Ridley was immediately arrested and sent to the Tower, but Cranmer was not arrested until 14 September. Laurence Hussey, Anthony's son, was apprehended on 20 July carrying letters from Jane Grey's Council in the Tower to the Duke of Northumberland: at the time of the King's funeral, he was a Groom of the Chamber. Cranmer's arraignment and condemnation, together with Guildford Dudley and Jane Grey, occurred at the Guildhall in London on 13 November 1553, after which he was sent to the Bocardo Prison in Oxford to await execution. It was not until after Cranmer had been tried for heresy (under papal jurisdiction) in 1555 that Rome decreed him to be deprived of his archbishopric, and his execution occurred at Oxford on 21 March 1556.

Anthony Hussey's work as Registrar to the Archbishop thus took a different turn after 14 September 1553, but as Proctor to the Court of Arches, of which John Story now became Dean, he remained attached to the functions of the Canterbury Court. As registrar to the Dean of St. Paul's he served until 1554 with William May as Dean, when May was replaced by John Feckenham, who more readily served the purposes of Edmund Bonner, the reinstated Bishop of London. The London bishopric appears to have shared its Chancellory with London, and Hussey also kept registers for the bishop of London. But in October 1553 his attention was occupied by his election to the first parliament of Queen Mary, sitting for Horsham, West Sussex probably at the behest of the Duke of Norfolk, and in the circle of his cousin Sir Henry Hussey, who (having sat for Horsham in the first parliament of 1553) then sat for Lewes. In that parliament Anthony was not listed among those who stood against the reinstatement of the Roman Catholic religion.

In October 1554, at his house in Paternoster Row in London (but in his absence), Dr Henry Harvey and John Incent the notary issued in Hussey's name a form of restitution for a priest who had married under the reformed authority but now put aside his wife to continue in his vocation. His son Lawrence having been presented by Sir Andrew Judd to the prebend of Bishopstone (Salisbury diocese) in December 1554, in January 1554/55 Anthony Hussey was appointed one of the actuaries in Stephen Gardiner's condemnation of Bishop Hooper. He appears as Registrar to the Dean and Chapter of St Paul's, sitting with Harvey, on 10 March 1554/55. On 14 February 1554/55 Sir Henry Hussey made his will granting his manors to his brothers, but to his cousin Anthony Hussey of London and his heirs males in remainder, also requiring Anthony to ensure that his brothers made sufficient assurance of these estates and to act as their learned counsel in the entailing thereof. His witnesses included Sir John Tregonwell, Henry Harvey, Robert Johnson, Thomas Lodge (Alderman) and John Incent the notary: Sir Henry lived until 1557.

=== Inquisitions ===
At an uncertain date, Hussey appears in John Foxe's Acts and Monuments in the examination of suspected heretics, though his interventions are not of the most extreme nature. Thomas Green (by his own testimony) was taken up on the orders of John Story for having an heretical book called Antichrist in his possession, and Story was very stern against him and imprisoned him in the Lollard's Tower. After some time Hussey came in friendly guise to get him to say where the book had come from, but on having no satisfactory answer he grew angry and said he had come in friendship and hoped to have the truth from him. So Hussey sent him back to the Lollard's Tower, but at his going called him back and said he already knew who had given him the book. Green answered that Hussey knew more than he did himself.

Hussey called him again a week later and told him more of what he knew, not omitting to say that he knew Green had other copies of the book and demanding to know what he had done with them. Green then confessed that he had given one to an apprentice, and begged him not to harm the young man. Hussey promised this, provided that (because he had not at first confessed) Green himself would abide his judgement. To this Green assented, which was, that he should be whipped like a thief or a vagabond. After a further month in prison he was beaten with rods in the presence of Dr Story (who wanted to have his tongue cut out and his ears cut off), and was at last released.

Green did not, however, give up the name of his supplier, an Englishwoman named Elizabeth Young who came to England from Emden "with her diverse books and sparsed them abroad in London". She was taken and was subjected to nine separate examinations, the first of which was conducted by Anthony Hussey (as "one of the Arches"), who had her held in The Clink in Southwark. She confessed to him that she had absented herself from Mass for many years for sake of conscience. Was there not (asked Hussey) also a question of conscience in picking a flea off one's skin when it went to bite? That, she replied, was an easy [i.e., facile] argument to displace the Scriptures, upon which her salvation depended. He asked why she would not take an oath on the Gospels before a judge, and began to instruct her in it, but she refused to learn the oath as she could not understand it. Hussey replied that she did not want to understand it, and brought his examination to an end. The case was then passed to Dr Thomas Martyn, who with Dr Story mounted an examination for heresy, but through the mediation of the Dean she overcame the articles raised by the Bishop of London and was released.

=== Merchant Adventurers: Muscovy ===
The voyage in search of a Northeast Passage to Cathay, led by Sir Hugh Willoughby, departed in April 1553. The fate of Willoughby, who froze to death in January 1553/54 together with the crews of two ships, was not immediately known in England, but Richard Chancellor and Stephen Borough survived to return to England in the summer of 1554 in the Edward Bonaventure, having made diplomatic and commercial negotiations in first contact with Tsar Ivan IV in Moscow. Trade from central Europe into Muscovy (which then had no direct connection to the Baltic) was partly controlled by the Hanse, but the northern sea-route offered the means to circumvent this. Chancellor had carried letters of greeting from King Edward, and brought a reply from the Tsar offering friendship, trade and privileges in return, which, owing to Edward's death, was received by King Philip and Queen Mary.

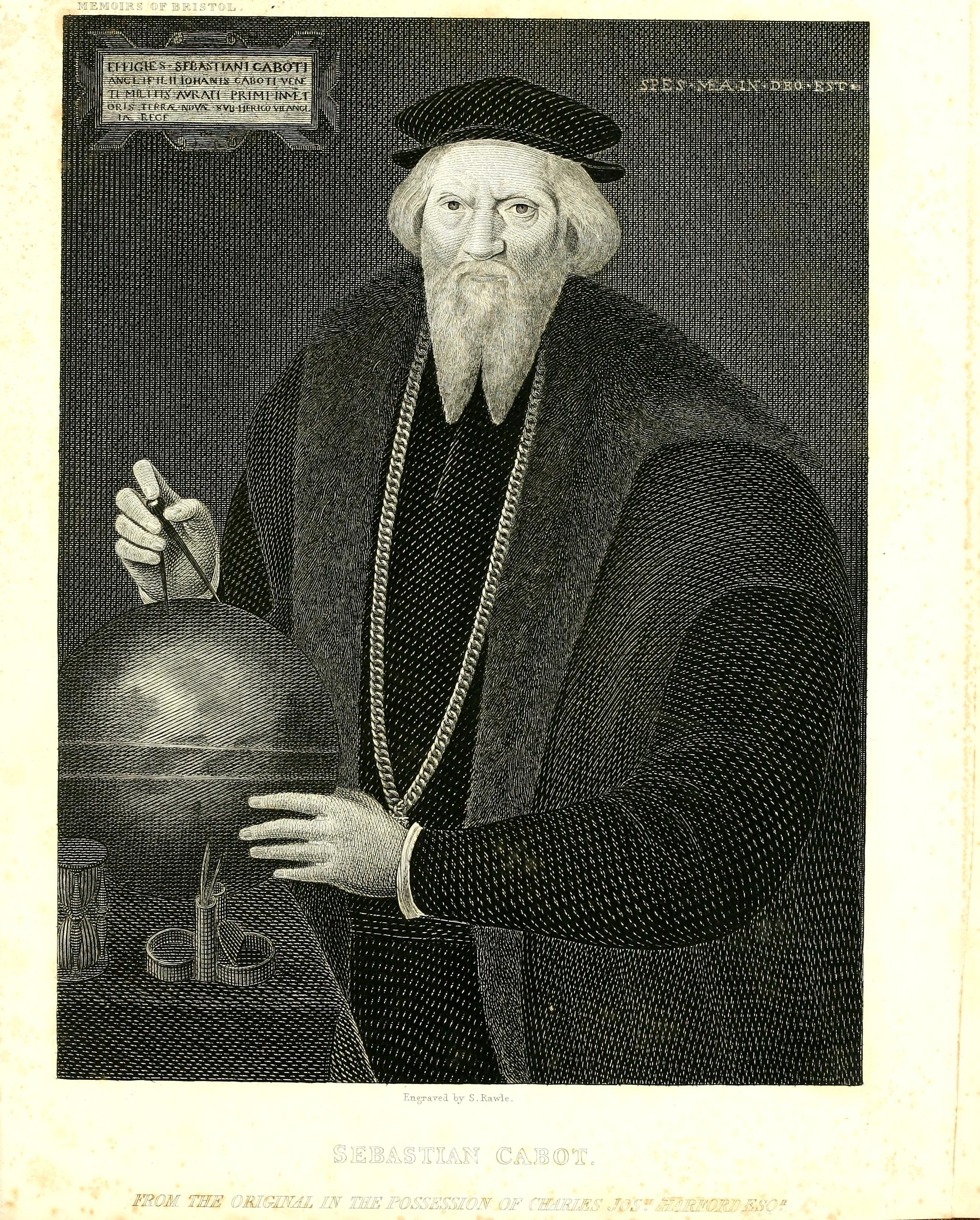
Sebastian Cabot

In February 1554/55, Mary issued the first fully ensealed charter to the Company of Merchant Adventurers to New Lands (later called the Muscovy Company). This opened by reciting the sponsors or adventurers already invested in the first voyage, among whom Anthony Hussey was one. Moreover, he was by name constituted one of the four founding Consuls (together with Sir George Barne, Sir William Garrard and John Southcote), under Cabot its governor. Barne and Garrard were respectively Lord Mayor and Sheriff of London through the year of Edward's death and Mary's accession, 1552–1553. Hussey's mercantile, Admiralty, notarial and archiepiscopal horizons suited the needed expertise, intelligence and polity; Southcote, a nephew of John Tregonwell's, was a respected lawyer of the Middle Temple, in middle life, who sat in both parliaments of 1553 and had a career of prominence in justiciary lying before him. Sir William Garrard became Lord Mayor of London late in 1555.

Philip and Mary composed a response to the Tsar on 1 April, and on 1 May 1555 Hussey was present as the whole Company assembled in open court to issue the articles for the second voyage. It was now intended for Russia, to be led by Richard Chancellor as Pilot of the fleet consisting of the Edward Bonaventure and the Philip and Mary. Richard Gray and George Killingworth were authorized to be agents and factors, and attorneys general and special for the company. After entering the Northern Dvina the ships returned to England while Chancellor and the agents left a party at Vologda in October and proceeded to Moscow. Killingworth's letter dated 27 November 1555 describes the success of their dealings with the Tsar, who addressed the grant of his first special privileges to the company, as to Cabot, the Consuls and Assistants, to Queen Mary.

Willoughby's frozen ships were found and refitted, and, the Edward Bonaventure leaving Orwell Haven again in April 1556 with Stephen Borough and the pinnace Searchthrift, in July 1556 Chancellor set off home in the Edward with the Bona Esperanza, the Bona Confidentia and the Philip and Mary, taking with him Osip Gregorejwitsch Nepeya as an ambassador from Moscow. The refitted ships were lost off the coast of Norway: in early November 1556 the Edward Bonventure was driven onto a rocky shore at Pitsligo, Aberdeenshire, where Chancellor with many of his crew were drowned. Nepeya, however, survived: Dr Laurence Hussey (Anthony's son) and George Gilpin were sent to bring him to London, where a narrative of his journey and his extensive reception in London through March and April was recorded for Anthony Hussey by John Incent. By April 1557 Lawrence Hussey was back in Scotland about the Queen's business on behalf of Lady Lennox.

On 21 February 1556/57 the council issued instructions to the officers of the Wardrobe to deliver "a bed of estate with furniture and hangings", and to the Jewel House for "two pairs of grete white silver pottes", to Mr Hussey, Governour of the Merchauntes Adventurers, or three of his deputies, for the chamber of the ambassador during his visit. The Philip and Mary limped into London on 27 February 1557, and Nepeya returned to Muscovy in the voyage led by Anthony Jenkinson for the company which set forth on 12 May 1557. The company's letter to the agents in Colmogro explained that Master Anthony Hussey had given to Jenkinson a commission for further travelling, and that they should deliver to him some "painefull young men" (i.e. painstaking) to continue in search of the route to Far Cathay. This letter was signed off by Hussey with Andrew Judd, George Barne, William Garrard and William Chester, the latter having taken Hussey's place as Consul when Hussey succeeded to Sebastian Cabot as governor. Hussey's governorship oversaw Jenkinson's remarkable expedition from Moscow to Bokhara between April 1558 and 1560.

=== Merchant Adventurers: Antwerp ===
The decree by which the Council of king Edward VI withdrew the Liberties of the Stillyard was upheld in the first parliament of Queen Mary, in October 1553. A body of Hanseatic merchants attended Mary's coronation procession at Gracechurch, and early in the following year Mary, to gratify the Hanse towns, suspended the operation of these Acts for three years and relieved the merchants from the extraordinary taxation which had been imposed upon them. A further deputation from the Hanse in 1555 gained little ground. From 1555 to 1556 the governor of the Merchant Adventurers was John Marshe, MP (1516–1579), who was married to a cousin of Thomas Gresham's and became father-in-law to Anthony Jenkinson. Marshe, who had an extended parliamentary career, has been called "the outstanding Governor of the century", and was sympathetic to the reformed religion. Hussey succeeded him, both as Royal agent and governor, from 1556 to 1559, and Marsh resumed from 1559 to 1560 and from 1562 to 1572, becoming a valued intelligencer.

By the time of Hussey's appointment, by June 1556, Ridley and Latimer had been burned to death in Oxford in the preceding October, and Thomas Cranmer had suffered there on 21 March 1556. Hussey went to Antwerp bearing royal instructions to stamp out Protestantism among the members of the English Company. When Thomas Mowntayne fled to Antwerp and lived there for eighteen months to avoid persecution, "than commys over mr. Hussy beynge than guvernor of the Inglyshe nasyon, and yt was gyven owte that he wolde sodeynly shype and send awaye ynto Inglande al soche as were come over for relygion, he namynge me hymselve for one..." In September 1556 Hussey obtained permission from the Select Council to return to London for six weeks, reporting that all the members of his Company were Catholics apart from four, against whom the Queen wished to proceed. From Ghent, King Philip himself granted this permission, referring the "four persons who obstinately maintain their absurd opinions" to the Inquisitor of Flanders. Nicholas Wotton was to be recalled from the French court, and Dr. Thomas Martyn to succeed him there as ambassador. Hussey delivered certain instructions to Dr Martyn on 14 October 1556: Lawrence Hussey was admitted an Advocate of the Arches on 27 October following.

In September 1557 Hussey, together with William Garrard and Randall Cholmeley, received a commission from the council to investigate the matter of three ships which had been captured by the French. It was suspected that the masters and mariners had betrayed the ships to their captors, by treachery or cowardice, and they were to be apprehended and imprisoned for examination. Anthony Hussey and Thomas Argall were also to search the house of the Queen's printer, John Cawood, for writings and evidences. More formally, on 2 December Hussey, "a Master of Chancery, and Governor of the Merchants Adventurers" was joined to a general commission led by the Bishop of Ely to seek out subtle practises by native and foreign merchants, by which gold and silver bullion and plate were being exported, counterfeit money was being brought into the realm, usury was practised, the value of merchandise imported by merchant strangers was not employed in the commodities of the realm, and the customs of wools and other staple wares were being concealed. They were to investigate all these matters from the commencement of the Queen's reign.

These were the usual complaints laid against the Merchants of the Stillyard, and arose in response to a fresh deputation in August on behalf of the Hanse seeking the restitution of their lost privileges. In the following year they obtained only the most recently discussed privileges and an assent that they should pay the same tolls as the English. At the beginning of January 1557/58 attention turned fully to the loss of Calais, and the council instructed the Lord Privy Seal to summon Mr Hussey, "and to wyll him to call suche marchauntes as he shall thinke mete to consulte and consyder amonge themselfes what porte is moste meteste for the common passage oute of this realme unto Flaundres", and to declare their opinions unto him. There followed a letter from the council to Hussey, considering that the ambassadors of the Stedes (the Hanse towns) had now departed, requiring him in the Queen's name to use all means at his disposal to find whether they went directly home to their country, or if they went by way of the King's Majesty. He is also required "to write hither from tyme to tyme suche occurrentes as he shall understande."

=== Cardinal Pole ===
The death of Stephen Gardiner, Bishop of Winchester and Lord Chancellor to Philip and Mary, on 12 November 1555 made way for Thomas Cranmer to be deprived of the See of Canterbury officially on the following day. On 11 December following, Reginald Pole was appointed cardinal-priest and administrator of the See of Canterbury by the pope. The University of Cambridge appointed Pole its chancellor in Gardiner's place, and in 1556 he succeeded Sir John Mason in the equivalent dignity at Oxford, so that he held both chancellorships at once. Although of a mild disposition, Pole had in 1554 negotiated the Revival of the Heresy Acts on behalf of the Queen, in exchange for the concession that confiscated former monastic properties should not be taken back from their new owners.

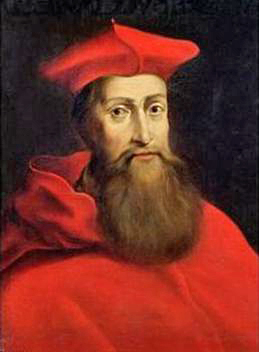
Cardinal Pole

The custody of the Great Seal and the title of Lord Chancellor were bestowed upon Nicholas Heath, Archbishop of York. His episcopal revenues were, however, appropriated to Pole, the Cardinal Legate, who, having sat in Convocation until its prorogation in February 1555/56, was consecrated as Archbishop of Canterbury on the first Sunday after the death of Cranmer, 22 March 1556. Pole's Consecration was drawn into Acts and attested by Anthony Hussey as Protonotary of the See, Thomas Argall Registrar of the Prerogative Court, Thomas Willett Apparitor-general, John Incent, public notary, and others. The pallium was presented to Pole in his Cardinal's robes at St Mary-le-Bow church (the Canterbury peculiar home to the Arches Court, in Cheapside), Bonner and Thirlby officiating, in the presence of dignitaries, witnessed by Hussey, Argall and Incent.

In 1869 the Librarians of Lambeth Palace made a formal affirmation that the handwriting of the Archiepiscopal Registers of Thomas Cranmer and of Reginald, Cardinal Pole was the same as in the opening section of Matthew Parker's Register, and that they believed them all to be from the pen of the Principal Registrar Anthony Huse. Hussey and Incent notarize the rehabilitation of Richard Kersey, a married priest renouncing his wife, on 10 July 1556, and on 12 July, as Registrar at Lambeth, he signs a Dispensation by Pole (and bearing his official seal) to Thomas Twysden, deacon of the Canterbury diocese, for Twysden to act as executor in his brother's will. These date shortly after Mary's instructions to Hussey as governor in Antwerp, and a week before Chancellor and Nepeya boarded the Edward Bonaventure for London.

At this time Hussey did great service to posterity by preserving Archbishop Cranmer's Register from the general destruction of writings devised against the Pope in the time of the late schism. Decrees for the gathering-in of such materials were issued in February 1555/56, December 1556 and February 1556/57. Hussey retained his office as Principal Registrar to the Archbishops of Canterbury until his death, but his enjoinder to John Incent "to binde upp in due forme the regester of the late Archebisshopp Cranmer, together with all bookes as well belonging to the Archebisshoppe as to the Deane and Chappiter of Caunterberie" was written in his will in January 1557/58, evidently referring to a danger then still present. As to London, an authentication dated 11 November 1557 describes him as "by holy apostolic authority notary of the Dean and Chapter of St Paul in London, registrar and sworn clerk of the said Chapter."

=== Testamentary affairs, 1557/58 ===
In Mary's last parliament (20 January 1557/58 to 7 March 1558, and 5–17 November 1558), Hussey was returned as Member for New Shoreham, a constituency represented in 1547 by his cousin Sir Henry Hussey. Sir Henry, who in 1553 sat consecutively for Horsham and Lewes, and in 1555 for Gatton, Surrey, had made his will in 1555, his overseers including Anthony Hussey, John Caryll and John Michell (of Stammerham). Sir Henry's sympathies were with the "true [i.e. reformed] religion". These arrangements came to fruition when his will was proved on 27 September 1557, making bequests to Anthony Hussey and to William his son. The executrix, his widow Dame Bridget, made her own will on 23 September 1557, mentioning both Anthony and Laurence Hussey and again appointing Anthony an overseer.

Hussey wrote his own will on 12 January 1557/58. Among various bequests (below) he restores a diamond to his "especiall good ladie" Dame Blanche Forman, as a remembrance of "the paines and travaile that I have taken in her affaires longe tyme paste": many of her legacies, in 1563, were dependent upon her "suit in Flanders". He needs to see the will of Robert Legge finally closed, of which he had been executor in 1550. On 1 February 1557/58 he was named executor in the will of Gabriel Donne, formerly abbot of Buckfast and now canon residentiary and stagiary of St Paul's Cathedral. Donne had pointed out to Hussey the place where he wished to be buried in St Paul's, and wished his will to be declared by Hussey "for that he best knowyth my mynde which I have declared unto hym." He makes gifts also to Mistress Hussey and to Lawrence and William, Anthony's wife and sons. Donne added a memorandum on the day of his death, 5 December, and his will was first proved on 14 December 1558.

=== William Hussey ===
A record is found in the Minutes of the Middle Temple, 6 February 1556/57, for the special admission of William Hussey, second son of one Hussey of London, Esquire, one of the Masters in Chancery, at the instance of his pledge Mr Richard Weston for a fine of 40 shillings. On 7 April 1558 Cardinal Pole announced the replacement of Anthony Hussey "our primary registrar for many years" by his son William Hussey and John Incent. This is said not to have taken effect, because his name is not found in Archbishop Parker's Register. The inference arose from a false supposition that the same William Hussey was alive and living in Wiltshire until 1581, with a wife and several children.

The true reason for his disappearance is that he was already dead before Archbishop Parker was consecrated. In 1633 Anthony Munday recorded Anthony Hussey's own statement carved in a stone monument that his son William Hussey, a bachelor, was Registrar of the Court of Canterbury but died on 27 October 1559 and was buried in St Martin, Ludgate by his grieving parents:

"Gulielmo Huseo, Cœlebi, Almæ Curiæ Cantauriensis Registro, literarum scientia vitæ probitate, morumque urbanitate claro, notis & amicis omnibus dilecto. Antonius et Katharina conjuges, Chari parentes, orbati filio, Monumentum hoc dolentes posuerunt. Obiit quinto Kalendas Novembris Anno Dom. 1559. vixit annos 28. menses 3. dies 7. Obdormiat in Domino."
[To William Hussey, Bachelor, Registrar of the Court of Canterbury, well-known for his knowledge of letters, probity of life and civilized habits, loved by all his friends and acquaintances: the espoused Anthony and Katharina, loving parents bereaved of their son, in grief placed this Monument. He died on 5 Kalends November [sc. 27 October], A.D. 1559. He lived 28 years, three months and seven days. May he have repose in the Lord.]

It therefore appears that the appointment did take effect, and may have continued for almost 8 months under Reginald Pole and perhaps well into the year following the accession of Queen Elizabeth, before he died in October 1559 leaving no issue.

== Elizabeth ==
The deaths of Sir George Barne on 18 February 1557/58, and of Sir Andrew Judde in October 1558, deprived the Merchants of Muscovy of two of their leading figures, leaving Garrard, Chester and Lodge to take up the helm of governance more directly; and in 1559 John Marshe resumed his governorship of the Merchant Adventurers in Antwerp. Archbishop Pole, in a letter dated 30 October 1558 to Nicholas Harpsfield (very soon after his appointment as Dean of the Arches), instructed him to fulfil the existing commission to make a Visitation of All Souls College, Oxford, granting him power to advoke the (Chancellorship) election dispute and to associate Anthony Huse "our principal registrar", or a surrogate for him, during the sede vacante of Oxford. The deaths of Queen Mary and of Pole himself, both on 17 November 1558, put an end to Rome's chance of re-establishing control over the Church in England. Queen Elizabeth's Pardon Roll of 15 January 1558/59 designated Anthony Hussey as "Governor of the merchant venturers in the lower parts of Italy, alias a master of Chancery".

=== The Accession ===
Through the alteration of religion which now arose, the accounts of Anthony Huse, Esq., "Collector for the institutions of benefices for the Dean and Chapter of Canterbury during the vacancy of the archiepiscopal see," 1558–1559, demonstrate that his offices were maintained. Dr Wotton, still the long-serving Dean of Canterbury, by an ancient Privilege at once put out a commission for Lawrence Hussey, as Dean of Shoreham and Croydon (the Canterbury peculiar attached to the Court of Arches), to visit the churches of the deanery. Letters written to Matthew Parker by Nicholas Bacon, Privy Seal, and William Cecil, Lord Secretary, in December 1558 show that Parker was immediately favoured for succession to the Archbishopric (though he resisted the royal invitation until the middle of 1559). Elizabeth's coronation in January 1558/59 was performed under Catholic authority by the Bishop of Carlisle. The Act of Supremacy, restoring the Queen's authority over the State Ecclesiastical and Spiritual, though passed by Parliament in April 1559 (at the time of the Westminster Disputation), was lawful as from the commencement of Parliament in January 1558/59. The legitimation of the reformed hierarchy of the English church awaited the consecration of its Archbishop to proceed with the consecration of the reformed bishops-elect, and to validate subsequent ordinations. Hussey's participation offered the reassurance of a notarial continuity.

=== Matthew Parker ===
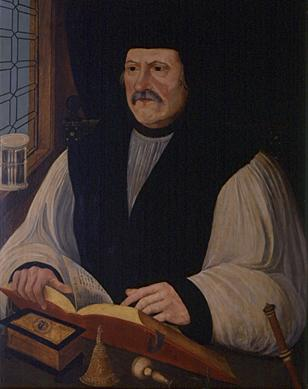
Matthew Parker

In this, the last great matter in Hussey's career, his long, intimate involvement in the Reform since the time of Wolsey reached its destination in the Elizabethan Religious Settlement. Several Roman Catholic bishops were deprived in June 1559. On 18 July 1559 Elizabeth sent her writ for the election of an archbishop to the Dean and Chapter of Canterbury, and they soon afterwards assembled and elected Parker, the Queen's candidate. On 3 August 1559 they reassembled and appointed proxies to attend upon Parker, choosing William Darrell, Anthony Hussey and John Incent, issuing to them a deed under the Common Seal of the Chapter, making them party to the Dean and Chapter. They accordingly attended upon Parker (who lay at Lambeth) on 6 August, presented the writ of proxy, explained the process of election, and prayed and required him to consent to it. This he did by a written instrument included in Hussey's record. On 9 September Elizabeth, in her right under the Act of Supremacy, sent a commission to bishops Cuthbert Tunstall (Durham), Gilbert Bourne (Bath and Wells), David Pole (Peterborough) and Anthony Kitchin (Llandaff), and to William Barlow and John Scory (who had been deprived of their bishoprics by Mary but were now newly elected), ordering them to confirm and consecrate Parker as Archbishop.

The Catholic bishops did not comply, and over the next two months Tunstall, Bourne and Pole joined the ranks of the deprived. Parker advised William Cecil that the Queen needed to direct her Patents to four bishops, or an archbishop, to confirm and consecrate him, so as to conform with the orders given by Henry VIII, and that the temporalities should not be transferred until the consecration was fully completed. As there were neither four active bishops nor an archbishop remaining, Cecil consulted six learned doctors of law, whose opinion was that the Queen, having supremacy, might empower bishops who had been deposed under Mary to perform the office. Meanwhile, on 27 October Gilbert Dethick, Garter King of Arms, reinforced Parker's position by making a grant of arms. Elizabeth, on 6 December, issued a new commission to William Barlow (elect of Chichester), John Scory (elect of Hereford), Myles Coverdale (formerly Exeter), John Hodgkins (suffragan of Bedford), John (suffragan of Thetford) and John Bale (Bishop of Ossory), adding a clause that if in any respect the procedure should be found faulty or uncanonical this would be remedied by a future Act.

=== Family affairs ===
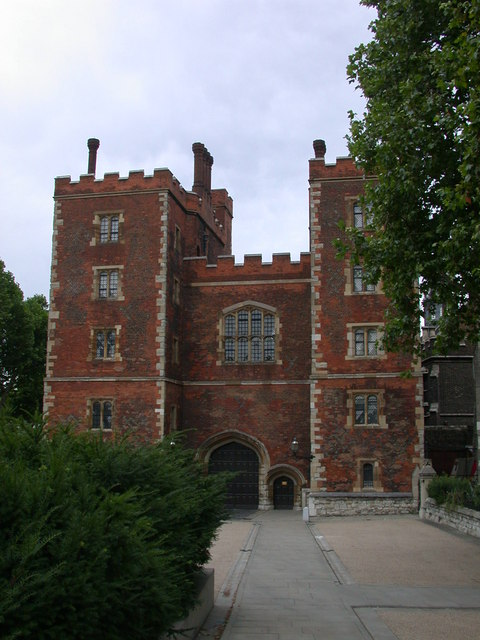
Lambeth Palace gatehouse

In the intervening period, Hussey suffered two deaths in his immediate family. His son William Hussey died on 27 October 1559, as his memorial inscription records. But also Hussey's brother-in-law Thomas Godman, citizen and Mercer of London, husband of Margaret Hussey, made his will on 1 September 1559 in Anthony's presence. Margaret, who had eleven children mostly in minority, Godman appointed his sole executor, enjoining her to follow the "wisdomes" of his overseers and "dere beloved frendes" Benjamin Gonson and Lawrence Hussey, son and son-in-law of Anthony Hussey. The will was proved in the Prerogative Court of Canterbury before Walter Haddon on 4 December 1559. On 7 December Parker appointed his proxies to the commissioners, who opened their Court at St Mary-le-Bow on 9 December, and proceeded to the Confirmation. These proceedings were recorded by William Clark, Notary Public, in place of Anthony Hussey, who was (for reasons not stated) absent on that occasion. Margaret Godman lived on until 1596.

=== Parker's Consecration ===
The Consecration of Matthew Parker as Archbishop of Canterbury took place in the chapel of Lambeth Palace on 17 December 1559, at which Barlow, Scory, Coverdale and Hodgkins were the four bishops required by the Statute to officiate, and in the presence of bishops-elect Edmund Grindal (London), Richard Cox (Ely) and Edwin Sandys (Worcester), and of Anthony Hussey Esquire, principal and primary Registrar of the said Archbishop, Thomas Argall Esquire, Registrar of the Prerogative Court of Canterbury, Thomas Willett and John Incent, Notaries, and several others. Of such importance was this event in the establishment of the new hierarchy, that it attracted the efforts of many Catholic scholars who wished to overturn its consequences. However, as Registrar to the Archbishop, Hussey had commenced the Register of Parker, inscribing a lengthy title declaring Parker's election, confirmation and consecration, and naming himself Principal Registrar of the said very reverend father. This is the official copy of the record, but a second copy also survives in manuscript in the Parker Library of Corpus Christi College, Cambridge from Parker's own papers. Parker was enthroned at the end of December.

On 4 February 1559/60 Hussey was associated in a commission to hear the grievances of the prisoners in London, in which he is designated "the Recorder of London for the time being." In Parker's Register, a note is interpolated after the title page noting the deaths of Anthony Hussey and of Archbishop Parker:

"Primo die mensis Junii Anno d'ni 1560 prefatus Anthonius Huse mortem obijt, cui successit Johannes Incent in officio Reg'rariatus predict"
[On the first day of the month of June A.D. 1560 the foresaid Anthony Huse died, whom John Incent succeeded in the said office of Registrar.]

== Death and testament ==
=== Funeral ===
Henry Machyn gives a description of Hussey's funeral:

"The first day in [the] morning of June (1560) died master Hussey Esquire, and a great merchant of the Muscovy and other places, and against his burial was made pennons of arms and a coat armour, and a six dozen of escutcheons of arms... The fifth day of June was buried master Hussey Esquire, and a great Merchant-adventurer and of Muscovy and Haberdasher, and with a hundred mourners of men and women; and he had five pennons of arms, and a coat armour, and two Heralds of Arms, master Clarenceux and master Somerset; and there was [St] Paul's choir and the Clerks of London, and buried at St Martin's at Ludgate by his son: and all the church hanged, and his place, with black and arms, and a six dozen and a half of escutcheons of arms; and master Alley the reader of Paul's preached both days; Sir William Garrett, Sir William Chester, master Lodge the sheriff, master Argall, master Bull, and master Hussey (his son), and diverse other mourners, and after to the place to dinner, a goodly place." [spelling modernized]

=== Monuments, epitaphs ===
Hussey's tomb, a "comely" monument at the east end of the choir of St Martin, Ludgate, was beside that which he had raised in 1559 to his son William. The inscriptions were recorded by Anthony Mundy:

"Hic situs est Antonius Huse, Armiger, Londini natus, Archiepiscopi Cantuariensis, atque Capitulis de Pauli Londinen. Registrarius primarius. Qui aliquot annos Judicis causarum Maritimarum officio integrè functus, ac etiam in Magistratorum Curiæ Cancellariæ confessum cooptatus, vergente demum ætate ad Præfectum Collegiorum Mercatorum Angliæ, tam apud Belgas, quàm apud Moscovitas, et Rhutenos commercia exercentium accitus, lingua facundus, memoria tenax, ingenio, prudentia, doctrinaque pollens, morum comitate et probitate gratiosus, Laurentio, Gulielmo, Gilberto, et Ursula liberis, ex Katharina conjuge procreatis, non infelix, sexagesimo tertio ætatis Anno è vita excessit, Kalendis Junii, An. Dom. 1560."
[Here lies Antonius Huse, Esquire, born in London, Principal Registrar of the Archbishop of Canterbury and of the Chapter of St. Paul's, London. Who for some years having worked fully in the office of Judge of maritime causes, and also appointed among the Masters in Chancery, and finally summoned in later age to the Governance of the Companies of English Merchants-Adventurers, both among the Belgians and equally among the Muscovites and Ruthenians, eloquent of speech, of tenacious memory, powerful in mind, prudence and teaching, gracious in the ways of courtesy and honesty, not unfortunate in his children Laurence, William, Gilbert and Ursula born of his wife Katharine, departed this life in the sixty-third year of his age on the Kalends of June, A.D. 1560.]

=== Will ===
Hussey's will, dated 12 January 1557 but with some short additions, styles him as "governor of the English nation", referring to the Merchant Adventurers abroad. For executors he appointed Thomas Lodge and Benjamin Gonson, whom he trusted above all other friends, "for a quyet to be had between my wife and my children". His wife, his son Laurence and his daughter Ursula Gonson are his principal beneficiaries, and the sons William and Gilbert are not mentioned (both presumably already dead). His widow is to enjoy the house in Paternoster Row for life, and the remaining term to pass to Laurence and his heirs, or in default to Ursula. Laurence is to have his best gold whistle and signet to wear as a remembrance. He adds, "I requyre and chardge my saide sonne that he be lovinge, tender obedient and gratefull to his mother not offendinge nor provokinge her wrath by any meanes but to be comfortable to her in all her necessities as to the dutie of lovinge Children appertaineth." Benjamin and Ursula Gonson and their children, and the children of Margaret Godman, receive legacies, and Dame Joan Webbe is not forgotten.

To his fellow notary John Incent he left £20 in money, "and the jointe patente of myne office in Powles, willing hym to bynde upp in due form the register of the late Archbushop Cranmer, together with all books, etc., for the Dean and Chapter of Canterbury". There are also small legacies or keepsakes to Thomas Argall, to Mr John Peires and Christopher Clarke his deputies, to Sir John Tregonwell and to Nicholas Wotton ("my old frende master Deane for Canterburie and York"). His advowson in Salisbury he gives to Anthony Hoby. Among his mercantile colleagues he makes gifts to William Chester, William Garrard, and notably to Thomas Lodge his "great game [i.e. flock] of Swans", if he has not by then sold them himself. Some exchange of diamonds has occurred between himself and Dame Blanche Forman, on whose behalf he has made considerable efforts. To his friend in business Mr Bulley he settles all account involving the Mary Katherine and the salt now standing at Ratcliff. His "adventure in Russia" was to be divided into parts between widow and children: Katharine issued an acquittance for one moiety of a double share in the Society of Merchant Adventurers for the Discovery of Lands in 1565.

There follow two short addenda, one of 8 August 1558 and another of 12 November 1559, the latter concerning the will of Gabriel Donne. The final addenda were declared by mouth in the three days preceding his death, suggesting a prolonged deathbed scene in which he could no longer write. On 29 May 1560 he declared in the presence of William Chester and Mistress Hussey that he had completed his work in the wills of Robert Legge and Gabriell Donne, and now gave £100 apiece to Ursula Gonson's children, to her 40 angells to make her a chain, and to Benjamin Gonson 100 angells and a basin and ewer bought from William Chester. Mr Bulley should have 20 angells and two old nobles. Mr Argall was to have one of the small salts brought lately from Flanders. The Merchants Adventurers, whom Hussey required to make a table of remembrance of him, received £100 Flemish. To his godson Anthony Marsh he gave his advowson of Wells.

Lastly on 31 May 1560, the day before he died, Hussey made a declaration in the presence of Sir William Garrard, William Chester, William Bull, Thomas Argall and William Merrick. He granted 40 shillings a year to Edmund Campion, Sir William Chester's scholar at Oxford, for as long as he was a student in Oxford, and 26s.8d yearly to each of his six scholars at Trinity Hall during the time that they were students there. Finally he gave £20 to each of Thomas Godman's children. The will was proved before Walter Haddon by Lodge and Gonson on 31 October following, and on 7 December 1560 as Hussey's executors they made a fresh probate on Donne's will.

In the 1626 monumental inscription to his granddaughter Katherine (daughter of Laurence Hussey and wife of William Jordan), at Charlwood church, Surrey, Anthony Hussey is described as "Agent. propter Reginam Angliae infra Germania, et in Negotiis Mercatorie Angliae apud Belgas et Muscovitas Prefectus." [Agent for the Queen of England within Germany, and Consul in the Mercantile Relations of England with the Belgians and Muscovites]. The funeral, the will and the inscriptions, taken together, leave no room for doubt that the Registrar to the Archbishops, the Admiralty judge, and the governor of the Merchant Adventurers in Flanders and in Russia, were all one and the same man.

=== Heraldry ===
Hussey is often styled "Esquire" or "gentleman" because (as indicated by his funeral) he was armigerous. The arms of Hussey of Sussex are given as "Ermine, three bars gules", or as, "Barry of six, ermine and gules". A mid-16th century carving of the arms in stone is re-set into the more recent walls of Legh Manor in Cuckfield, Sussex, the seat of John and Mary Hussey, with the name "huʃee" in black-letter above it.

== Children ==
Hussey married Catherine, daughter of John Webb of Essex, by whom he had three sons and one daughter. Of these,

- Laurence Hussey, (died after May 1602), took the degree of Doctor of Civil Laws in Bologna. He married Margaret (died before 1573), a daughter of Sir John White of Aldershot (Lord Mayor of London 1563–1564) by his first marriage to Sybil White (sister of Sir Thomas White, Keeper of Farnham Castle). Issue.
- William Hussey, (1531-October 1559), Registrar of Canterbury, buried at St Martin, Ludgate. Unmarried.
- Gilbert Hussey.
- Ursula Hussey (died 1602), married (1) Michael Robertes, of Neasden (died 1544), and (2) the Surveyor of the Navy Benjamin Gonson (died 1577). Issue.
