= Laurence Hussey =

English lawyer and diplomat (c. 1527 – after 1602)

Laurence Hussey, or Lawrence Hussey (c. 1527 – after 1602), was an English lawyer, messenger and diplomat.

Laurence was probably the eldest of the three sons of Anthony Hussey and his wife Catherine (Webbe, of Dedham, Essex), who were married by 1526. He was educated at Padua and Bologna.

Laurence Hussey was a groom of the chamber to King Edward VI. In September 1550 he was sent to Scotland to accompany the French former hostage François de Vendôme, Vidame de Chartres as his harbinger, employed to find his food and lodgings. Hussey was arrested in July 1553 for carrying letters concerning Lady Jane Grey.

== Diplomat in Scotland ==
In February 1557, Hussey received safe conduct letters to travel to Scotland with two English merchants George Gilpyn and John Lewis. They were involved in the case of shipwrecked Russian diplomats who were sailing to England and their cargo looted from the Edward Bonaventure in Pitsligo Bay near Rosehearty on 7 November 1556. They brought letters from Queen Mary I and were accompanied by an interpreter for Russian called a "Tolmach". In Edinburgh, with the Berwick Pursuivant Henry Ray, they had an audience with Mary of Guise who attempted to recover goods from the ship by legal action. According to Richard Hakluyt, the Russian ambassador Osep Gregorovitch Napea left Edinburgh for London on 14 February 1557 to complete his mission, although his diplomatic gifts of sable fur and a hawk were lost. Thomas Wharton wrote from Berwick that the ambassador was lucky to have escaped from Scotland with his life.

Hussey was still in Scotland in April 1557 and met Mary of Guise and Henri Cleutin at Stirling Castle. He wrote from Edinburgh on the international situation to the border warden Lord Wharton, including inaccurate news of a French military success in Italy, and reported the safe arrival at Leith of three English ships scattered from a northern fleet by a storm. England and Scotland were at war and soon after the ships made an unsuccessful attack on the town of Kirkwall in Orkney. Hussey was acting on behalf of Margaret Douglas to ask forgiveness for her husband Matthew Stewart, 4th Earl of Lennox, then judged a rebel to the Scottish crown.

== Later life ==
Laurence was a Master of Chancery, and was replaced in 1602 by Henry Hickman. An inscription in the Church of St Nicholas, Charlwood, Surrey, recorded the burial of his daughter Katherine in 1626, wife of Sir William (Edmond) Jordan of Gatwick, and that Laurence had a Doctor's degree, was a Master of Chancery, and was the son of Anthony Hussey, the queen's agent in Germany, Belgium and Russia.

Laurence Hussey married a daughter of Sir John White of Aldershot (Lord Mayor) (by his first marriage to Sybil White, sister of Sir Thomas White, Keeper of Farnham Castle); he was thus the brother-in-law of Mary White, wife of Henry Offley, son and heir of Sir Thomas Offley. His sister Ursula became the wife of Benjamin Gonson, Surveyor of the Navy; his brother William Hussey was briefly appointed Registrar to Reginald Pole, Archbishop of Canterbury, in 1558, but died unmarried in late October 1559, aged 27, and was buried in St Martin, Ludgate. Of their brother Gilbert little more than his name is known.

== Sources ==
- Edmund Lodge, Illustrations of British History vol. 1 (John Chidley: London, 1838)
- Agnes Strickland, Lives of the Queens of Scotland, vol.2 (Edinburgh, 1851)
