= Edward Bonaventure =

English sailing ship

Edward Bonaventure was an English ship under the command of Richard Chancellor that was forced to seek shelter in 1553 on the north coast of Russia near Nyonoksa due to weather conditions, leading to its crew coming into contact with the court of Ivan IV of Russia (Ivan the Terrible), the formation of the Muscovy Company, and diplomatic contacts between Elizabeth I of England and Russia.

== English trade with Russia ==
In 1553, Edward was one of a fleet of three ships under the command of Sir Hugh Willoughby, the other two ships were the command ship Bona Esperanza with Willoughby on it and the Bona Confidentia with its captain Cornelius Durforth. The fleet was financed by London's Company of Merchant Adventurers to New Lands and it was organized by Sebastian Cabot with the purpose of finding the northeastern passage to the Far East and left London on 10 May 1553. Richard Chancellor was the pilot for the voyage. The opening of the northeastern passage from England to India was desired to avoid conflict with Spanish and Portuguese ships. During a fierce storm, the Edward separated from the other ships and arrived at the Danish held Vardø which was the established rendezvous location in case of fleet separation but the other two ships did not arrive and thus Edward continued onward. It landed near the mouth of the Dvina River not far from the convent of St. Nicholas and its crew were taken to meet the first Russian tsar, Ivan IV ("the Terrible"). It remained for repairs during the winter near Nyonoksa, which produced salt for Tsar Ivan the Terrible, sailed on its return voyage to England in 1554 and robbed by Flemish pirates along the way. Chancellor brought to England letters opening trade with Russia removing the Hanseatic League's previous monopoly on trade with Russia.

At the end of May 1555, Edward sailed on a second mission from England to Russia financed by some former members of the Company of Merchant Adventurers to New Lands who now called themselves Merchant Adventurers for the Discovery of Lands, Countries, Isles, etc., Not Before Known or Frequented by any English also known as the Russia Company or Muscovy Company with Richard Chancellor in charge departing London also with the Philip and Mary which was to obtain fish oil at Vardø and then return to England. Edward arrived in Russia with English agents who, along with Chancellor, were to meet with Tsar Ivan the Terrible to officially open diplomatic relations and trade with Russia which were achieved. In 1555 before winter closed the shipping route, Edward returned to England joining Philip and Mary at Vardø leaving Richard Chancellor and the agents George Killingworths, Henry Lane and Arthur Edwards in Russia for the winter.

In 1556, Edward sailed from England to Russia again with Philip and Mary and Richard Chancellor in charge with additional crew who were to sail the Speranza and the Confidentia back to England. In 1556, Edward along with Philip and Mary left Russia and sailed for England with the first Russian Ambassador to England Osep Gregorovitch Napea, who had been the Governor of Vologda, Napea's wife, many Russians and the previously lost two ships Confidentia and Speranza which both had been found in 1555 anchored in the mouth of the Arzina River (Russian: Арзина река) east of the Pechenga Monastery with no one of the nearly seventy in the crews surviving the winter of 1553–4. On 10 November 1556, Edward was wrecked off Rosehearty on the east coast of Scottish coast. Among the hundred who died was Richard Chancellor, but Osep Gregorovitch Napea, the first Russian ambassador to England, survived as a widower. The other three ships had wintered in Trondheim and attempted to return in 1557 but only the Philip and Mary made it to London in July 1557 with both the Speranza and the Confidentia lost at sea.

== Further trade with Russia ==
Osep Napea stayed in Edinburgh for while. An English envoy Laurence Hussey and his Russian interpreter spoke to the ruler of Scotland Mary of Guise and there were efforts to recover his property salvaged from the wreck. He travelled by land to London in February 1557.

In 1557 and subsequent to the voyages of Edward Bonventura and its sister ships, Anthony Jenkinson, who became the first English Ambassador to Russia in 1566, led a fleet of ships financed by the Muscovy Company to Nyonoksa, Russia, consisting of the Primrose on which he sailed, John the Evangelist, Anne, and Trinity.

Dutch interests in trading with Russia began in the 1560s.
