= Company of Merchant Adventurers to New Lands =

English joint stock company, founded 1551

The Company of Merchant Adventurers to New Lands was an early joint stock association, which began with private exploration and enterprise, and was to have been incorporated by King Edward VI in 1553, but received its full royal charter in 1555. It led to the commencement of English trade with Russia, Persia and elsewhere, and became known informally, and later formally, as the Muscovy Company.

== First phase ==
The Company was formed in London in about 1551 by Richard Chancellor, Sebastian Cabot and Sir Hugh Willoughby. Some 240 adventurers (investors) purchased shares at £25 each and a royal charter was prepared for their company under King Edward in 1553, making Sebastian Cabot its governor. However the King died before the charter could receive the Seal. The circumstances are described at the opening of the Charter of 1566:

"divers very good Subiects of this Realme of England in the latter end of the reigne of the late right high and mightie prince our Soueraigne Lord king Edward the sixt, at the gracious incouragement and right good liking of the said king, and by his Maiesties liberall example, did at their aduenture, and to their exceeding great charges, and for the glory of God, the honor and increase of the reuenues of the Crowne, and the common vtilitie of the whole Realme of England, set forth three ships for the discoverie by sea, of Iles, lands, territories, dominions and Seigniories vnknowen, and by the Subiects of the sayd late king not commonly by seas frequented: and after that Almightie God [...] called to his mercie the said king, who died before the finishing and sealing of his most ample and gracious letters of priuiledges promised to the sayd Subiects..."

The purpose of the Company was to seek a new, northern trade route to Cathay (China) and the Spice Islands (the Moluccas, now part of Indonesia).

The first expedition of the Company was led by Willoughby seeking the Northeast Passage to China. Three ships were outfitted and crewed for the expedition, which departed from London's Deptford Docks on 11 May 1553. Willoughby was aboard the Bona Esperanza (120 tons), with Richard Chancellor in command of the Edward Bonaventure (60 tons) and Bona Confidentia (90 tons). The ships became separated in a storm in the North Sea: the Bona Confidentia and Bona Esperanza rejoined, rounded North Cape and sailed east to Novaya Zemlya. The Edward Bonaventure likewise sailed around North Cape and along the Kola Peninsula, entering the White Sea in August. On 24 August 1553, Chancellor cast anchor near the mouth of the Dvina River and was met by local Russians. While his crew wintered over near present-day Arkhangelsk, Chancellor travelled overland to Moscow, where he was received by Tsar Ivan the Terrible. Willoughby's two ships turned back from Novaya Zemlya in September and attempted to overwinter on the coast of Lapland. Every crew member soon died from cold and hunger.

Chancellor returned to the White Sea in March 1554 and arrived back in London in the autumn, bearing a letter from Tsar Ivan to the English king, welcoming trade between the two Christian nations. By this time King Edward had died and Queen Mary I was ruling in England.

== The Charter of Incorporation, 1555 ==
In 1555 the Company received its formal royal approbation in a Charter of Incorporation issued under the date 6 February 1554/5 (but long afterwards amended to 26 February) by King Philip and Queen Mary, of which the full name was

"The Marchants Adventurers of England for the Discovery of Lands, Territories, Iles, Dominions and Seigniories Unknowen, and Not before that Late Adventure or Enterprise by Sea or Navigation Commonly Frequented"

as one body and perpetual Fellowship and Commonalty. The promoters of this Charter are headed by William Marquess of Winchester (Lord High Treasurer), Henry Earl of Arundel (Lord Steward of the Household), John Earl of Bedford (Lord Keeper of the Privy Seal), William Earl of Pembroke, and William Lord Howard of Effingham (Lord High Admiral of England), who with others

"Haue at their own aduenture, costs and charges, prouided, rigged and tackled certaine ships, pinnesses and other meete vessels, and the same furnished with all things necessary haue advanced and set forward, for to discouer, descrie, and find, Isles..." (etc.)

The charter constituted the company under its governor, Sebastian Cabot ("the chiefest setter forth of this iourney or voyage"), with four consuls, Sir George Barne, William Garrard, Anthony Hussey and John Southcote, with 24 assistants named from among the principal adventurers, its many named investors becoming the Fellowship. The Fellowship was to meet annually to elect one or two governors and 28 of 'the most sad, discreete and honest persons' of their fellowship as assistants to the governor or governors, of whom four were to be chosen consuls. This became known (for short) as the "Muscovy Company" or Russia Company, and its members the Merchants of Muscovy or Merchants of Russia.

The Company sent Richard Chancellor again to the White Sea in 1555, in the Edward Bonaventura and the Philip and Mary, where he learnt of the fate of Willoughby and spent 1556 in further exploration and negotiations with the Tsar. Having recovered and refitted the Bona Esperanza and Bona Confidentia, he set out to return, taking with him the first Russian Ambassador to England, Osip Gregorjevitsch Nepeya. Three of the ships attempted to overwinter at Trondheim, where both of Willoughby's ships were lost, the Philip and Mary arriving in London in April 1557. Chancellor's ship went ahead but in November 1556 foundered off the east coast of Scotland near Pitsligo, and Chancellor was drowned. Nepeya however was rescued, and was conducted by Viscount Montagu to London, where in March 1557 he was met by a grand procession led by Sir Thomas Offley, Lord Mayor, and conducted through the City to his appointed lodging. Here during the months of March and April he was fêted by the City Companies, and with the exchange of royal gifts he returned safely to Moscow.

== Elizabeth's Charter of 1566 ==
In 1566 Queen Elizabeth I issued a new Charter of Incorporation to confirm the Company's privileges. This Charter, which was confirmed by Act of Parliament, reincorporated the Company as

"The Fellowship of English Merchants for the Discovery of New Trades".

Having referred to Mary's Charter of 1555, this continues:

"Since the making of which letters patents, the said fellowship haue, to their exceeding great costes, losses and expences, not onely by their trading into the said dominions of the said mightie prince of Russia, &c., found out conuenient way to saile into the saide dominions: but also passing thorow the same, and ouer the Caspian sea, haue discouered very commodious trades into Armenia, Media, Hyrcania, Persia, and other dominions in Asia minor, hoping by Gods grace to discouer also the country of Cathaia, and other regions uery conuenient to be traded into by merchants of this realme, for the great benefite and commodities of the same."

It continues to explain that there has since arisen unlicensed trade: "divers subiects of this realme... minding for their peculiar gaine, vtterly to decay the trade of the said fellowship, haue contrary to the tenor of the same letters patents, in great disorder traded into the dominions of the said mightie prince of Russia, &c., to the great detriment of this common wealth:" and therefore, that in future no part of these places "shall be sailed or traffiqued vnto, visited, frequented or haunted by any person being or that shalbe a citizen or denizen of this realme, by themselues, their factor or factors" other than by the order, agreement, consent and ratification of the Fellowship, on penalty of the forfeit ipso facto of their ships and goods so trafficking, half to the Crown and half to the Fellowship. Established merchants of York, Boston, Newcastle-upon-Tyne and Hull who were already continually involved in such trade and were invested before 25 December 1567 were to be accounted free of the Fellowship and bound by its statutes.

At this time Sir William Garrard and Sir William Chester were its governors. It continued to be referred to as the Muscovy Company. Further English ventures led to the creation of the Levant Company in 1581, the Venice Company in 1583, East India Company in 1600, Virginia Company in 1609, and the Hudson's Bay Company in 1670.

== See also ==
- Company of Merchant Adventurers of London
