= Nicholas Woodroffe =

English merchant

Sir Nicholas Woodroffe (Woodruff, Woodrofe, etc.) (1530–1598) was a London merchant of the Worshipful Company of Haberdashers, who, through the English Reformation, rose in the Alderman class to become a Master Haberdasher, Lord Mayor of London and Member of Parliament for London. Through the complexities of his family's relationships, and the position and security which they afforded, he lived to establish his family among the armigerous houses of late Elizabethan Surrey.

== Origins and early life ==
Nicholas Woodroffe's father David (c.1503–1563) was born of a merchant family of Uffculme, Devon, who are supposed to have derived from the Woodroffes of Wolley in Royston, South Yorkshire. Admitted to the freedom of the Haberdashers in 1526, he married within the Company soon afterwards, and like his father-in-law John Hill, Haberdasher, became a Merchant of the Staple at Calais. Hill, 'whose ancestors were of the north,' had married Agnes Mowsdale, a goldsmith's daughter of London. Nicholas was born to David and Elizabeth Woodroffe around 1530, the eldest of at least four sons, who were in time outnumbered by their sisters. John Hill died in 1534, and his son Rafe, uncle of Nicholas Woodroffe, was admitted a freeman of the Haberdashers in 1541.

The role of the great Livery companies in City governance under the Court of Aldermen faced extraordinary challenges. The reform of the Guilds or Crafts had proceeded with many new Charters of Incorporation during Henry VIII's reign. In the 1540s heavy demands were made upon them for subsidies, loans and military recruitments by the Crown. The disentangling of their endowments vested in dissolved houses, almshouses, and chantries of benefactors brought both disruption and opportunity. As the anticipation of Protestant succession to the English throne unfolded and then reversed, the Lord Mayor and aldermen steered through violent alterations to maintain civic and commercial interests.

== Family alliances ==
David Woodroffe, a prominent shipping merchant, having advanced in the Company was elected Alderman for the Bishopsgate ward in 1548, and in the same year his son Nicholas was admitted to freedom. From the 1530s Woodroffe's shipments in the wool trade in Calais were associated in cargoes with those of the Merchants Taylor Stephen Kirton, Master of that Company 1542–43 (who became Alderman for Cheap ward in 1549), and his brother-in-law Thomas Offley, Master 1547–48 (Alderman for Portsoken ward 1549–50, and from 1550 for Aldgate ward), and were a matter of consideration for competitors.

By the 1540s Elizabeth Woodroffe, sister of Nicholas, was married to Walter Leveson, son of James and nephew of Nicholas Leveson, all Staplers of Calais of Stafford and Wolverhampton origins. Walter's father had remarried around 1530 to Margery, sister of Thomas Offley, consolidating the Offley and Kirton family interests arising from the sphere of Sir Stephen Jenyns (died 1523).

The further alliance of these families occurred in 1553 through the union of Nicholas Woodroffe and Grizell, eldest daughter of Stephen Kirton and Margaret Offley. Kirton endowed the marriage richly with a great house which the Merchant Taylors had built at the north-west corner of Lime Street, near Leadenhall, and other tenements, adding a gift of £266.13s.4d. Here Nicholas and Grizell maintained their London residence thereafter. The match immersed Woodroffe fully in the conflicted allegiances of Mary's reign.

David Woodroffe purchased the 'fair house of old time' called the Green Gate, nearby, which Nicholas afterwards inherited. Between them stood the house of Lord Zouche. This was bought and rebuilt, with a high wooden tower, by Richard Whethill, Merchant Taylor and Stapler of Calais, who before 1552 married Jane Kirton, Grizell's sister. Having lived to see the accession of Queen Mary, Kirton died in August 1553, his Evangelical sympathies expressed in provision for thirty sermons, one to be delivered monthly from the day of his burial at St Andrew Undershaft. His distinguished armorial Achievements were set up there in 1554. His son Thomas Kirton, then 16, succeeded to Kirton's manor at Thorpe Mandeville in Northamptonshire.

== The Marian period ==
With the reversal of religious climate, Thomas Offley served honourably as Sheriff of London in the Mayoralty of Sir Thomas White, 1553–54. In the following year, David Woodroffe, of Catholic sympathy, served in the same capacity but made himself a conspicuous instrument of the Marian persecutions, dealing cruelly and scornfully at the burnings of John Rogers and John Bradford, in high contrast to the sentiments of his fellow Sheriff William Chester. To the Sheriffs fell the duty of conducting these executions. Soon after completing his term David Woodroffe was paralysed by a stroke, but remained Alderman until 1560. Offley served as Mayor in 1556–57, and was knighted together with William Chester, whose daughter was married to Offley's half-brother Richard. Thomas Kirton became Common Serjeant of the City of London.

Two of Grizell Woodroffe's sisters married sons of another Sir Thomas White, of South Warnborough, M.P., their father's maternal cousin, reinvesting their shared Gaynesford and (claimed) Hungerford lineage. Sir Thomas, strongly Catholic, was Keeper of Farnham Castle, Surrey, and Master of Requests to Queen Mary. By his marriage to Agnes White and that of his sister Sybill to Sir John White of Aldershot, M.P., Agnes's brother, he was closely identified with John White, the Marian Bishop of Lincoln (1554–56) and of Winchester (1556–59), (brother of Agnes and Sir John), to which diocese Sir Thomas was Treasurer. Nicholas Woodroffe progressed unhurriedly in the Haberdashers' Company through Mary's time, perhaps deterred by his father's example.

== Elizabethan prosperity ==
Elizabeth's reign brought his family better times. Richard Whethill was Master of the Merchant Taylors in 1562–63, and died in 1566. Stephen Woodroffe, Nicholas's brother, gained freedom of the Haberdashers in 1560, continued in commerce, and married Bridget, daughter of Christopher Draper (Lord Mayor 1566–67). Walter Leveson having died in 1554, Elizabeth Woodroffe remarried favourably to George Stonehouse, Purveyor for the Northern Army and Surveyor of the King's Victuals at Berwick in King Edward's time, and Clerk of the Green Cloth in the Queen's House. There were five children, and five from his previous marriage.

Nicholas Woodroffe was chief mourner at his father's heraldic funeral in 1563, Christopher Draper, Thomas Offley, William Garrard and William Chester being the four aldermen in the procession to St Andrew Undershaft. Properties in St Albans and East Barnet passed in time to his brothers, Stephen, and Robert, by remainder from their mother. Their sister Margaret, by her first marriage to Anthony Pargiter, Haberdasher, produced a family of eight children. On completing a term as treasurer to St Thomas's Hospital, 1569–71, in Chester's Presidency, Nicholas Woodroffe was elected Alderman of Bridge ward Without, and advanced immediately to be Sheriff in the mayoralty of Sir Lionel Ducket, 1572–73. Jane, the youngest of his six children, was born in 1572, the year in which his mother died: his mother-in-law Margaret Kirton and George Stonehouse both died in 1573, and his brother Stephen in 1577.

The expansion of the family's connections into the south and west country followed. Elizabeth Stonehouse, whose family was established at Radley, Berkshire, remarried to Richard Kingsmill of Highclere, M.P., (of a family of puritan sympathy), Attorney of the Court of Wards to Queen Elizabeth. Her sister Margaret had a second family by marriage to Edward Greville (of the Grevilles of Northend, Warwickshire, but lately of Charlton Kings, Gloucestershire), who bought a manorial estate at Shotteswell, Warwickshire, in 1576. Robert their brother settled with his wife Dionysia (Calthrop) in the neighbouring parish of Cropredy, Oxfordshire. There they were not far distant from Thorpe Mandeville, to which their brother-in-law Thomas Kirton in time retired. Nicholas Woodroffe, now the elder figure of the Woodroffes, prospered in London and continued to take apprentices.

== Mayoralty, and in parliament ==
In 1574 Woodroffe transferred to the aldermanry of the Dowgate ward, and in 1579–80 became Lord Mayor. The Sheriffs were customarily sworn at Michaelmas Eve (28 September), and the Mayor elected on St Edward's Day (13 October), though he did not assume office until November. Woodroffe's term began – or his predecessor's ended – with a cause celèbre, concerning a pamphlet by John Stubbs, The Discoverie of a Gaping Gulf, published in August. It was written against the negotiations then taking place towards the Queen's possible marriage to Francis, Duke of Anjou, and was considered seditious.

During September 1579 the Lord Mayor (Richard Pipe) was instructed to direct the members of the Livery companies to surrender all copies of the pamphlet. The whole edition was to be destroyed, and the names of people owning copies were to be taken. The Companies delayed, and on 27 September 1579 the Lord Mayor received a further most unequivocal Order of Council, signed by Bromley, Leicester, Hatton, Burghley, Hunsdon, Sidney and Walsingham. On 7 November 1579 the author and publisher had their right hands cut off. Although this affair has been assigned to Woodroffe's mayoralty his connection with it was incidental.

An earthquake in London on 6 April 1580 prompted some comment by Richard Tarlton, the Queen's jester; and Woodroffe was the addressee of the tenth "livelie Discourse" in Churchyard's Charge. Woodroffe is especially noted for a letter he wrote to Lord Burghley about the spread of infection in the city. He complained of there being too many Playhouses, which attracted unmanageable multitudes, encouraged the spread of plague, and distracted people from the service of God. He proposed various regulations, and an injunction against the 'haunting of playhouses'. He was knighted in February of that year. A letter of that date declining the Freedom of the City to a candidate proposed by Sir Christopher Hatton illustrates the exercise of his office.

In 1581 Woodroffe purchased the manor of Poyle in Tongham (parish of Seale), near Guildford, Surrey, and established his family seat there. The manor took its name from the de la Poyle family, from whom Dame Grizell was descended through her Kirton, White and Gaynesford ancestors.

He remained active in London, and in 1582 was a Commissioner of Subsidies. In 1584–85 he was elected Member of Parliament for London, and served on various committees, including the second reading of a Bill for suppressing Pirates and Piracy. He was simultaneously Governor of the Company of Merchant Adventurers of London during the attempts of the Hanseatic League to have the English interests at Emden extinguished. (The household of a fictionalised Woodroffe engaged in shipping ventures through Calais and Middelburg is portrayed in the Jacobean comedy A Cure for a Cuckold, written possibly around 1620.) In 1585 he was elected Master of the Haberdashers' Company, and was also President of St Thomas's Hospital 1584–86. Details of his connections with a lawsuit involving a bond for £400 made in 1587 are reproduced in a study of an episode in William Shakespeare's life. He continued his work as Alderman until 1588, when he obtained leave to stand down on the grounds of diminishing health, and gave up his cloak.

== Landed respectability ==
In his last years Sir Nicholas busied himself with the affairs of a gentleman of the shire in Surrey. Some letters of 1588 and 1596–97 addressed to Sir William More among the Loseley manuscripts concern military levies and musters, and show his association with George More and Francis Aungier. In one he protests to Sir William that the high cost of levies might better be met by sending equipment, when the parishioners were struggling for subsistence. Then he writes again, hoping to have given no offence.

By inheritance or purchase he had acquired various estates which he conserved on behalf of his children despite shrinking disposable means. When his sister Mrs Gracie Baynes died in 1597, Mrs Kingsmill and Mrs Greville, and brother Robert, were all living. Father of three sons and three daughters, Sir Nicholas Woodroffe died in May 1598 entailing lands to his heirs, appointing a marriage portion for his youngest daughter and a lifetime jointure for his eldest son's wife. Dame Grizell survived him, living until 1607. It is said that he and she maintained their Lime Street houses in good order and at low rents for their tenants, without crowding them, until the end of their lives. They were buried in the chancel of Seale church.

A pair of large stoneware presentation bowls with repoussé silver mounts and lids, and with engraved armorials and inscriptions identifying Sir Nicholas as donor, 1579, was sold in America in 1911 from the collection of Robert Hoe III. The coat of arms engraved on the foot of the bowls is not described in detail in the catalogue, but the accompanying motto "God be our Friend" is that of the Staple Merchants, to whom Sir Nicholas may have presented them.

== Children ==
The children of Sir Nicholas Woodroffe and Dame Grizell, née Kirton, were as follows:

- (Sir) David Woodroffe (d.1603), of Poyle, married (c.1594) Katherine (1567-after 1636), daughter of Sir John White of Aldershot by his second wife Katherine Sodaye (daughter of John Sodaye, royal apothecary, and widow of alderman Ralph Grenway). Katherine (the younger) had first married William Harding of Wyke in Worplesdon, Surrey, by whom she had children, and he died in 1593. She had a son Robert (c.1601–1639) and four daughters by David Woodroffe. Some years after his death she married (c.1610) Sir George Wrottesley (d.1636), previously husband to Cecily Ridley, widow of Thomas Jervoys.
- (Sir) Robert Woodroffe (d.1609) of Alvington, Gloucestershire, married Mary, sister of Edmund Fox. There were no children. Mary survived him, but died before June 1610, when her brother swore to administer Sir Robert's provision for his nephew, Sir David's son, of which he became an executor by his sister's death. A similar grant of administration made in April 1610 to Sir George Wrottesley, as the younger Robert's guardian, was thereby revoked.
- Stephen Woodroffe of Tongham (living 1639).
- Mary Woodroffe, married first (1591) Richard Cotton (1570–1607) of Horsendon, Buckinghamshire (son of John Cotton of Whittington, Gloucestershire), a co-executor of Sir Robert's will. She married secondly Sir Thomas White of Farnham (1561–1640), son of Sir John of Aldershot and full brother of Dame Katherine Woodroffe. A godson of Sir Thomas Offley, he was previously married to (Matilda) Vernon.
- Elizabeth Woodroffe, married William March, who died probably c.1605. They had two sons and six daughters.
- Jane Woodroffe (born 1572), married (1599) John Machell (1580–1647), son of Mathew Machell of Shacklewell, Middlesex (c.1547–1593) and Mary Lewknor (sister of Edward Lewknor of Denham). (Machell's wardship and marriage were granted to Francis Harvy in 1597.) They had four sons and at least three daughters. John Machell remarried to Lady Elizabeth Aungier (daughter of Francis Aungier, 1st Baron Aungier of Longford, and widow of Symon Carryll) in 1624, and the bloodlines of both houses were united in the succeeding generation.

Civic offices
Preceded by Richard Pype	Lord Mayor of London; 1579–1580	Succeeded by John Branche
