= Canonical provision =

Catholic practice

In the canon law of the Catholic Church, canonical provision is the regular induction into a benefice.

== Analysis ==
It comprises three distinct acts - the designation of the person, canonical institution, and installation. In various ways a person may be designated to fill a vacant benefice: by election, postulation, presentation, or recommendation, resignation made in one's favour, or approved exchange. In all cases confirmation by the proper ecclesiastical superior of the selection made is required, while letters of appointment, as a rule, must be presented.

Reception of administration by a chapter without such letters brings excommunication reserved to the pope, together with privation of the fruits of the benefice; and the nominee loses ipso facto all right to the prelacy. Ordinarily greater benefices are conferred by the pope; minor benefices by the bishop, who as a rule has the power of appointing to all benefices in his diocese. The pope, however, owing to the fullness of his jurisdiction, may appoint to any benefice whatsoever.

=== History ===
In England, since a charter of 1214, bishops had been appointed by free canonical election of cathedral chapters. Therefore in the thirteenth century, it was unusual for a bishop to be appointed by papal provisions, however by the fourteenth century it had become much more common. When the Hundred Years War between France and England started in 1337, the papal court sat in Avignon and favored France, so relations between England and the papacy became increasingly tense. The pope filled many of the English vacancies with his own appointees. These appointees did not reside in England, but collected revenues from their benefices anyway. When some of these revenues found their way into the French royal treasury, many Englishmen complained to Parliament about the abuse, and an English statute (Statute of Provisors) was enacted in 1351 to prevent the pope from exercising several of his prerogatives. Similar enactments were made in 1390 and in later years. These statutes were finally repealed by the Statute Law Revision Act 1948.

At present, the Pope makes use of this right only in certain defined circumstances. The bishop's power is further restricted at times to confirming an election or postulation; or to approving candidates presented by one who enjoys the right of presentation by privilege, custom, or prescription.

== Canonical institution ==
Canonical institution or collation is the concession of a vacant benefice by one who has the authority. If made by the sole right of the prelate, it is free; if made by legal necessity, for example, after due presentation or election, or at the command of a superior, it is styled necessary. An ecclesiastical benefice cannot be lawfully obtained without canonical institution.

== Installation ==
Installation, called corporal or real institution, is the induction into the actual possession of a benefice. In the case of a bishop it is known as enthronization or enthronement. Corporal institution, according to common law, belongs to the archdeacon; by custom to the bishop or his vicar-general. It may take place by proxy: the rite observed depends much on custom.

To installation belong the profession of faith and oath, when prescribed.
