= Thomas Offley =

Mayor of London in the 1500s

Sir Thomas Offley (c. 1500/05 – 1582) was a Sheriff of London and Lord Mayor of London during the reign of Queen Mary I of England. A long-serving alderman of London, he was a prominent member (and once Master) of the Worshipful Company of Merchant Taylors, thrice Mayor of the Staple, and a named founding Assistant of the Muscovy Company.

== Origins and early life ==
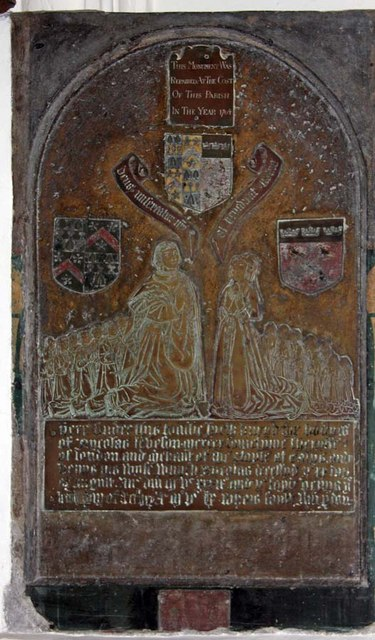
Brass (1539) to Nicholas Leveson the elder, Sheriff of London 1534–35, and wife Dionysia Bodley (died 1560): St Andrew Undershaft.

Thomas Offley was the elder of two adult sons of William Offley, a mercer of Stafford, by his first wife, probably of the Dorrington family of Stafford, whose sister (aunt of Thomas) was married to a member of the Cradock family prominent in Stafford. William Offley was Bailiff of Stafford in 1510–11, and after the family moved to Chester he was alderman of that city, and Sheriff in 1517. William Offley remarried to a widow Elizabeth Wright (née Rogerson), and had altogether 26 children, many by his second wife, several of whom made careers in London.

When aged about 12 Thomas was sent to London to study under William Lily at St Paul's School. Under Lily he acquired an excellent understanding of Latin and was taught to sing pricksong with the choristers of St Paul's. Thomas became bound for 13 years to Merchandize of the Staple with the Merchant Taylor John Nechylls, Merchant of the Staple at Calais, who was 'of great acquaintance' with Lily. Nechylls was married to Katherine, daughter of Sir Stephen Jenyns (Lord Mayor 1508–09, founder of the Wolverhampton Grammar School 1508–15), who in 1501–02 married Margaret, sister of lawyer and M.P. John Kirton. Nechylls, Master of the Merchant Taylors in 1522, was elected alderman of London in 1525 for the Broad Street ward but made suit to be discharged of office, and was not admitted.

Offley summoned his sisters to London, one of whom, Margaret, was in service in Nechylls's household. On Katherine's death Nechylls married her, and promised his daughter and sole heir Joan in marriage to Thomas. Offley was still in Nechylls's service when he died in 1530, and married Joan at about the time of her father's death. Margaret his sister remarried to the Merchant Taylor and Merchant of the Staple of Calais Stephen Kirton, John Kirton's son, who had been Jenyns's apprentice and godson. John Offley, Thomas's full brother, married Alice Rogerson, his own step-sister, and kept house for John Nechylls at his country residence, the Brick House at Hackney. The wealthy brothers Nicholas Leveson (died 1539), Stapler of Calais and Mercer, and James Leveson (died 1547), of a prominent Wolverhampton mercantile family, were engaged in the same circle: Margery Offley, sister of John, Thomas and Margaret, having gained a fortune by a first marriage to Thomas Michell, Ironmonger, remarried to James Leveson around 1530.

== Civic office ==
Offley prospered in business, and his eldest son (of three), Henry, was born in around 1536.

Despite being disfranchised in May 1546 by certain merchants of the Staple for colouring of wools, Thomas rose steadily in the Merchant Taylors, becoming Master of the Company in 1547. In that year he purchased the manor of Madeley, North Staffordshire, from Sir Edward Bray (then Lieutenant of Calais Castle) and Dame Joan, daughter and heiress of Sir Matthew Brown, and this remained the family's country seat for several generations.

The many-gabled Tudor manor house, since demolished, is illustrated by Michael Burghers as it appeared in 1686 in Plot's History of Staffordshire, together with the formal gardens and a later east frontage. He received a grant of arms on 3 May 1547.

=== Alderman and sheriff ===
Offley was elected alderman for Portsoken ward in 1549, and transferred to Aldgate ward in 1550, which he represented continuously thereafter until his death in 1582. In 1553 he was (as one of six aldermen required of the Mayor George Barne) summoned by the Duke of Northumberland to sign the King's Letters Patent for altering the royal succession. In the first year of the reign of Queen Mary I, 1553–54, he served as Sheriff of London, together with William Hewett, Clothworker, in the mayoralty of Sir Thomas White, a foremost figure among the Merchant Taylors. He was the Mayoral nomination of George Barne on 23 July 1553, immediately following the death of King Edward VI, the reign of Lady Jane Gray, the proclamation of Queen Mary and the arrest of the Duke of Northumberland.

Offley's shrieval year commenced with the condemnation of Guildford Dudley, Thomas Wyatt's rebellion against the Spanish marriage, the many subsequent executions in London, and the overturning of the reformed Church establishment. Dudley was delivered to Offley by the Lieutenant of the Tower for his beheading at Tower Hill: but it is said that Offley saved many who should have died for Wyatt's conspiracy. Queen Mary sent him as Sheriff a gilt and engraved armour and twelve gilt and engraved partizans from the Tower of London. Late in the year he witnessed the visit of Philip of Spain to London.

=== Family matters ===
The Sheriffs of the following year were both Offley's kinsmen, William Chester, whose daughter was married to his half-brother Richard Offley, Merchant Taylor, and David Woodroffe, whose son Nicholas Woodroffe was husband of Margaret Kirton's daughter Grizell (Stephen Kirton having died in 1553). The fortunes of his half-brethren had been carefully advanced by Thomas Offley and Margaret Kirton (who remained a widow), each taking one as apprentice. The eldest, Robert, served his apprenticeship with a wealthy widow in Cheapside, who in time married him. Alderman Offley purchased Robert's Freedom of the Staplers, and Robert prospered in trade through Calais and later through Bruges in Flanders. William Offley and Thomas Offley junior also became very wealthy and successful Merchants Taylor and Merchants of the Staple, and Hugh Offley, Draper, who maintained the family connection with Hackney, dabbled in conspiracy, but successfully developed his own civic career in London. It is suggested that Thomas Offley may have assisted Hugh's flight to France after his entanglement in the Henry Dudley conspiracy.

=== Mayoralty, 1556–57 ===
Offley was named one of the 24 Assistants to Sebastian Cabot, Governor, and his four Consuls in the 1555 charter of the Company of Merchant Adventurers to New Lands (the Muscovy Company). He proceeded to the Mayoralty of London in 1556–57, his sheriffs being William Harpur, Master Merchant Taylor, and John White, Grocer. Henry Machyn described the inauguration: "The 28 day of October (1556) the new mayor took his oath, and so went by water to Westminster with trumpets and the waites royal, and a gallant pinnace decked with streamers and guns and drums; the new mayor Master Offley, merchant taylor, and merchant of the Staple of Calais, and the two henchmen in crimson velvet imbrodered with gold an ell broad; and 40 poor bachelors, and they did give 40 blue gowns, cap, doublet and hose to the 40 poor men; and there was a godly pageant; and the trumpets had scarlet caps, and the waites." On 7 February following the river journey was made again to Westminster, where both Offley and William Chester were knighted on the same occasion.

Among the notable events of his mayoralty was the arrival and visit of King Philip in March 1557, with a royal procession through the city from Tower Wharf, which Offley escorted. He led the civic welcome to the first ambassador of Tsar Ivan IV, Osip Gregorjevitsch Nepeya, who, having survived the last ill-fated voyage of Richard Chancellor, was in London throughout March and April. Offley, with all the aldermen in their scarlet, met him with the Viscount Montagu at Smithfield Bars, and they rode together (preceded by a host of merchants and dignitaries and followed by the apprentices) through the thronged streets of the City to the ambassador's lodgings in Fenchurch Street. Among the many ceremonies and honours accorded to Nepeya he was banqueted at the Mayor's House, and Offley no doubt took an important role in his conducted inspections of the great places of the City.

In a raging fever which afflicted London a number of aldermen died, making way for new elections, and several heretics were burned at the stake during the summer months. In August Offley represented the city as chief mourner at the memorial ceremony in London for King John III of Portugal. News was brought of the military victory against the French at St Quentin. Offley, himself a merchant of Calais, was able to complete his mayoral term before the loss of Calais in January of the following year, by which he personally suffered considerable losses of goods and lands, and England the loss of her last continental territory. At that time his half-brother Richard Offley, Merchant Taylor, was his very efficient factor in Calais.

== Offley the Elizabethan ==
Offley's son Henry, who had been brought up with a command of French and Latin, acted as his factor in Bruges, selling wools, keeping accounts and receiving money for exchange into sterling. He married Mary, a daughter of John White the Grocer and alderman, who (having been Sheriff in Offley's mayoralty) served as Lord Mayor in 1563–64. Offley became godfather to Mary's half-brother Thomas White at his baptism in February 1560/61. Thomas and his sister Katherine White later married two of the children of Sir Nicholas Woodroffe. Thereby the familial alliances of the Marian period (themselves expressive of more ancient kinships) were continued and carried down into the 17th century. At three important civic funerals of the 1560s Offley was among the leading mourners, for Sir Rowland Hill in November 1561, for alderman David Woodroffe in March 1563 and again for Ranulph Cholmley (Recorder of London since 1553) in April 1563.

The names of Sir William Chester, Sir Thomas Offley and Sir Thomas Leigh head the list of those incorporated as Merchants of the Staple of England in Elizabeth's Charter of 1561. From 1559 Offley (by now a very wealthy man, but given to much charity and simple in his private tastes) served as president of Christ's Hospital, the house established in the former Grey Friars at Newgate for the reception and education of poor men's children. In 1565 he was among the substantial donors to Thomas Gresham's fund for the building of the Burse at the Cornhill. In 1568–69 he joined with Sir Thomas Rowe (Mayor), Sir Thomas White, Sir Roger Martyn, Lionel Duckett and others in formulating a policy of retaliation against Spanish traders following the Duke of Alva's provocation.

Offley was Mayor of the Staple both of England and of Westminster at various times during the 1560s, and helped to draw up new ordinances for the Staplers. The Offley Manuscript states that he was repeatedly chosen as a man most worthy of that trust and dignity, because, in the absence of the Lord Chief Justice, the recognizances of the Staple were acknowledged before the Mayor of the Staple and the Recorder of London. He served into the 25th year of Elizabeth as alderman, becoming chief alderman and Father of the City of London (from 1571). When kneeling before the Queen at the knighting of a Lord Mayor, "she commanded two of her gentlemen pensioners to take him from kneeling and set him upon his feet. 'I know you well (said she) Mr Alderman, and I knew you in my father's time.' " He was Surveyor-General for Hospitals from 1567 to 1572, and Comptroller-General for Hospitals from 1572 until his death. His sister Margaret Kirton died in 1573: her will refers to her brothers and sisters, and to her Cradock cousins in Stafford.

In his late years Offley played a role in a dispute over lands in the Lime Street ward between St Augustine Papey and Bishopsgate. Some dwellings there having been improved by the removal of certain unruly inhabitants, the residents of Aldgate ward encouraged Sir Thomas to claim them for Aldgate. The contrary case, on behalf of Lime Street, was brought by Sir Rowland Hayward, and the matter was resolved at the wardmote (in Lime Street's favour) by the intervention of John Stow, who produced an ancient ledger formerly belonging to the dissolved Priory of Holy Trinity in Aldgate. In 1579 Richard Pype successfully claimed them for Bishopsgate ward.

== Death and exequies ==
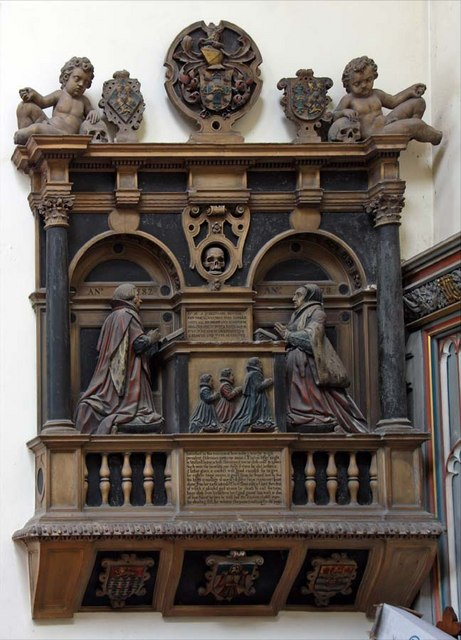
Monument to Sir Thomas and Dame Joan Offley in the church of St Andrew Undershaft, 1582.

Dame Joan Offley died late in 1578, and Sir Thomas Offley made his will in August 1580. He desired to be buried in Madeley church, or (if dying in London) in the middle aisle of the choir of St Andrew Undershaft, near to the graves of his wife and of David Woodroffe. He left about half of his wealth in charitable bequests, and made his son Henry his heir. A bequest was made to the daughter of John Dorrington, Haberdasher, late of London, presumably a member of his mother's family. He also acknowledged his brother John and his half-brothers Robert, Thomas, Richard, Hugh and William Offley and their wives, and his brothers-in-law then living, Gyles Jacob and Robert Bowyer. The will was proved on 24 October 1582, and an Inventory survives: he died on 29 August 1582 and was buried on 17 September following at St Andrew Undershaft.

The wall-mounted monument at his tomb, by Cornelius Cure, which survives in St Andrew Undershaft, shows fully sculpted figures of Thomas and Joan kneeling at prayer in arched recesses either side of a central altar, in front of which are shown their three sons, two of whom (as the inscription records), 'it pleased god above by death to call for'. The scene is enclosed by free-standing pillars at either side, over a balustrade. Sculpted cherubs recline upon skulls above the cornice, and in addition to Offley and Nechylls heraldry there are shields for the Merchant Taylors, The Muscovy Company, and the Merchants of the Staple. The memorial verse gives his age as 82. The architectural detailing of the monument has been compared to the Offley Chest, made for his half-brother alderman Hugh Offley perhaps at about the same time.

== Family and descendants ==
Thomas Offley married Joan, daughter and heir of John Nechylls and Katherine Jenyns, in c. 1530. Their children were:

- Henry Offley (c. 1536–1613), of London, Madeley and Bruges, who married in 1567 Mary, daughter of Sir John White (Lord Mayor 1563–64) by his first wife Sibell, sister of Sir Thomas White of South Warnborough, Hampshire (Keeper of Farnham Castle).
- Robert Offley, who died young. It is claimed that he married Dorothy, daughter of John Smith, Baron of the Exchequer.
- --------- Offley, died in infancy.

Civic offices
Preceded by William Garrard	Lord Mayor of London; 1556–1557	Succeeded by Thomas Curtis
