= Robert Baker (explorer) =

Robert Baker (fl. 1562–3), was an English voyager to Guinea.

Nothing is known of Baker's family, but according to Hair he may have been related to the Bakers of Sissinghurst.

Baker started on his first voyage "to seek for gold" in October 1562. The expedition consisted of two ships, the Minion and the Primrose, and was "set out by Sir William Garrard, Sir William Chester, Mr. Thomas Lodge, Anthony Hickman, and Edward Castelin" (members of the Company of Merchant Adventurers of London). Baker's efforts to traffic with the natives on the Guinea coast were not very successful, and he was wounded in a fight. But he returned home in safety early in 1563. In November of the same year he made a second voyage to "Guinie and the river of Sesto" as factor in an expedition of two ships, the John Baptist and the Merlin, sent out by the same London Merchant Adventurers. On arriving in Guinea, Baker landed with eight companions to negotiate with the natives, but a storm drove the ships from their moorings, and Baker and his companions were abandoned. After suffering much privation six of the nine men died. The three survivors were rescued by a French ship, and imprisoned in France as prisoners of war; but they appear to have been subsequently released.

Baker wrote an account in verse of both voyages. It was printed by Richard Hakluyt in the first edition of his Voyages in 1589, but was not included in the second edition, with the result that it was 'long overlooked in studies of the period'.
