= William Chester (mayor) =

English merchant

Sir William Chester (1509 – c. 1574) was one of the leading English Merchants of the Staple and Merchant Adventurers of the mid-16th century, five times Master of the Worshipful Company of Drapers (and twice more for part-years), Lord Mayor of London in the year 1560–61 and Member of Parliament for the City of London. He should not be confused with his contemporary, William Chester, merchant of Bristol, M.P.

== Origins and early career ==
=== Parentage ===
Born about 1509, William Chester was the second son of John Chester, citizen and Draper of London, and his second wife Joan, née Hill, sister of the London citizen and Haberdasher John Hill (died 1516). By his first marriage John Chester had a daughter Alice (Grene), living in 1542 a widow and nun. Joan had previously been married to Richard Welles, Mercer, who died in 1505, and she had a son Anthony Welles, living in 1513. John and Joan Chester had two sons, Nicholas and William. John died in 1513, his annual obit being kept by the Drapers on 26 May at St Thomas of Acon, and by 1515 Joan remarried to Sir John Milbourne, Master of the Drapers' Company in that year, who had been Sheriff of London in 1510 and became Lord Mayor in 1521. There were no children by the marriage of Sir John and Dame Joan Milbourne.

=== In business: Drapers and Merchant Adventurers ===
William was educated at Peterhouse College in the University of Cambridge, but did not proceed to a degree. On leaving the University he entered at once into trade as a draper and Merchant of the Staple. He was made free of the Drapers' Company by patrimony in 1529, and in the path set by his stepfather (who died in 1536, his obit being kept on 5 April at the Crutched Friars) he and his brother Nicholas built their position within it, appearing as Freemen Householders of the Company in the Chapterhouse list of 1537. A Warden first in 1542-43, William Chester with Thomas Blower assisted William Roche (then Lord Mayor) in taking possession from Sir Edward North of the mansion of Thomas Cromwell, Earl of Essex, which had been purchased by the Drapers for their Company Hall following Cromwell's attainder.

In 1544 the art of refining sugar was first practised in England by Cornelius Bussine and four partners, of whom Chester was one. These adventurers set up two sugar bakeries which continued without rivals for twenty years and brought great profit to the proprietors. Dame Joan Milbourne dying in 1545, she was buried in St Edmund's, Lombard Street, where her son erected a monument in 1563. By his mother's will (of which he was executor and chief beneficiary) Chester received a considerable addition to his fortune. This probably enabled him to weather the storm which befell the English Merchant Adventurers in that year, when the Emperor Charles V placed an embargo on English merchandise. Secretary William Paget, writing from Brussels early in 1545, remarked: 'Some in dede shall wynne by it, who owe more than they have here, but Mr. Warren, Mr. Hill, Chester, and dyvers others a greats nombre are like to have a great swoope [i.e., loss] by it, having much here, and owing nothing or little'. His second term as Draper Warden was in 1546-47, and his third in 1549-1550, on each occasion in the Masterhood of John Sadler.

=== Civic responsibilities ===
The Act for suppression of Chantries having been revived in the first year of Edward VI's reign, in March 1551 Mr. Chester reported to the Drapers that the repurchase of the lands and benefits of their obitts would amount to £1402.6s. payable to the City's Trustees (Richard Turke, William Blackwell and Augustine Hynde). Closely involved in the refoundation of the Hospitals, and serving as Treasurer of St Thomas' Hospital, he was appointed in 1552 one of twelve persons, led by Sir Martin Bowes and Bishop Ridley, to petition the King on behalf of the City for the grant of Bridewell Palace for the reception of vagrants and mendicants. Chester made generous private benefactions towards the reconstruction of Christ's Hospital, making "the bricke wals and way on the backe side, which leadeth from the said new Hospitall, unto the Hospitall of Sainte Bartholomew".

Chester was elected an Alderman of London for Farringdon Ward Without in January 1552-3. It was however as a senior Merchant of the Staple or Merchant Adventurer that he was among those summoned by the Duke of Northumberland to countersign the Letters Patent for the Limitation of the Crown, when the death of King Edward was anticipated.

== The Marian period ==
=== Masterhood and shrievalty ===
Chester was elected on 5 August 1553 to his first term as Master of the Company, and (with the alteration of religious policy on the accession of Queen Mary) was for 1554–55 Sheriff of London with David Woodroffe as his colleague, in the mayoralty of Sir John Lyon. In their term the Marian persecutions began in earnest: they were obliged to superintend executions of Reformers, in first place the distinguished divines John Rogers and John Bradford. Chester's humanity towards the sufferers was highly praised by John Foxe and contrasted with Woodroffe's harshness. Before giving Dr Rowland Taylor into the custody of the Sheriff of Essex, Chester intervened to allow him a leave-taking from his wife, and offered her his own house in which to await.

In 1541 Chester had taken as apprentice Lawrence Saunders, a Cambridge graduate, who longed to return to his religious studies. Chester released him from his bond, and during Edward's reign Saunders preached in the Midlands until appointed to All Hallows, Bread Street in 1553. Although warned against taking up his benefice he did so, and preached against the Roman errors. He was arrested on Bonner's orders, imprisoned in London, condemned as a heretic at St Mary Overie, and burned at Coventry in February 1555. Chester, a governor of Christ's Hospital, also took a sustained interest in the career of Edmund Campion, and sponsored him as a scholar to St John's College, Oxford. In December 1557, John Bury, his wife's nephew, dedicated to him a translation of the Parænesis to Demonicus by Isocrates.

=== Muscovy and Antwerp ===
Although not named an officer or assistant in King Philip and Queen Mary's 1555 Charter to the Muscovy Company, Chester was of the founding fellowship under Sebastian Cabot as Governor and George Barne, William Garrard, Anthony Hussey and John Southcote as Consuls. Chester was a joint owner of the ships Primrose (with Andrew Judde, William Castelin and Anthony Hickman) and John Baptist (with Andrew Judde). He witnessed the exchange of royal gifts with the Russian ambassador in London in 1557, and afterwards with Judd, Hussey, Garrard and Barne sent report of the death of Richard Chancellor to George Killingworth and others in Russia by a mercantile fleet in which both ships sailed.

In 1556 Chester was elected to his second term as Master of his Company, and transferred to the ward of Billingsgate. On 7 February 1556/7 he was knighted, together with Sir Thomas Offley, Lord Mayor, by Queen Mary at Greenwich. This unusual honour for an alderman (especially one being of contrary religion) is said to have been bestowed because he was a merchant of great account in the city of Antwerp, whereby he furnished King Philip with great treasure and sums of money upon his arrival in England. In that year his eldest son William Chester was made free of the Drapers' Company. Following the fall of Calais it fell necessary for Mary to license Chester and other Merchants of the Staple (including aldermen Judd, Offley, Woodroffe, Leigh and Lodge) to ship to Bruges in Flanders, and to pardon their disregard of the statutes during the previous year.

== Chester the Elizabethan ==
At the onset of Elizabeth I's reign Chester, now a very wealthy man, with various others participated in a loan of £30,000 to the Crown and was granted rights to receive interest at ten per cent. With them he received grants of reversions and rents in 1560. He transferred to the ward of Bassishaw in 1559, vacant by the death of alderman John Machell, and embarked upon his third term as Master of the Drapers' Company. Chester and his Wardens brought to Chancery decree a claim concerning a twenty-year-old legacy in the Company's trust of 12,000 gold ducats, provision for the orphaned kin of a Welsh merchant in Seville. The case was still in progress in 1566.

He was appointed a royal commissioner (1559 and 1562) to implement Acts of Parliament for uniformity of prayer, to regulate the grievances of prisoners in the Ludgate, and to restore the ecclesiastical supremacy of the Crown. For the City he was made a commissioner for purchasing the site of Gresham's Royal Exchange, and contributed £10 towards the fund. In June 1560, with Sir William Garrard and Thomas Lodge (then Sheriff), he was among the principal mourners at the public funeral of Anthony Hussey. Hussey's will (in which he further endowed Edmund Campion) shows his closeness to Chester, before whom his final codicil was declared in 1560, but his executors were Thomas Lodge and Benjamin Gonson.

=== Mayoralty ===
On 23 July 1560 occurred the funeral of his first wife, Dame Elizabeth Chester, daughter of Thomas Lovett of Astwell Castle, Northamptonshire. By her he had six sons and eight daughters, three of whom died in infancy. It was a very grand ceremony, with a procession of 100 men in new gowns and women likewise, aldermen and heralds with pennons, and singing clerks to St Edmund, Lombard Street, the street and church hung with black cloth and armorials. Thomas Becon gave her funeral sermon. For her monument Chester composed Latin verses of valediction. Amid these solemnities he was elected Lord Mayor (in succession to Sir William Hewett), assuming office towards the close of that year, and on 3 October his sons Thomas and John were admitted to freedom of the Drapers' Company by patrimony. In April 1561 obsequies were resumed when Dame Alice Hewett died and was buried at St Martin Orgar with an immense procession of mourners, heralds, the livery of the Clothworkers, and the aldermen with Chester the Lord Mayor in their midst.

Sir William Chester, Sir Thomas Offley and Sir Thomas Leigh head the list of those incorporated as Merchants of the Staple of England in Elizabeth's Charter of 1561, and John Marshe, Emanuel Lucar, Leigh, Garrard and Chester lead those newly reincorporated to the freedom of the Merchant Adventurers of England in July 1564. The commission upon uniformity of prayer, and for right religious observance and the reinstatement of deprived ministers, was renewed, and Chester was appointed to another to investigate the counterfeiting of currency. In Elizabeth's second parliament, which met on 11 January 1562/3, he sat as one of the representatives of the City of London. In March 1563, with Sir William Garrard, Sir Thomas Offley and Sir Christopher Draper, he represented the aldermanry at David Woodroffe's funeral. His fourth term as Master Draper was in 1563-64.

=== Mercantile activities ===
He was an investor in the 1562–63 and 1563 trading adventures to Guinea, led by the factor Robert Baker, and also in the 1564–65 expedition, all of which were for mercantile trade returning to England. His son, John Chester, took part in this expedition. In these ventures he was associated with Sir William Garrard, Sir Thomas Lodge, Anthony Hickman, Lionel Duckett and others, but he is not named by Richard Hakluyt as being among the promoters of the voyages involving human trafficking from Guinea to the West Indies in the same years. The Guinea mercantile trading voyages met with various misfortunes. With Martin Bowes and William Garrard Chester led a royal commission to inquire into the petition of Sir Thomas Lodge, Lord Mayor, at the time of his bankruptcy. Anthony Jenkinson obtained for Garrard, Lodge, Chester and others safe conduct and privileges for trading by Obdowlocan of Tabaristan in 1563. Their names recur in the grant of privileges by the Shah of Persia, communicated by Arthur Edwards from Astrakhan in 1566 and 1567 to Garrard and Chester as Governors of the Muscovy Company, then receiving its new Charter. Queen Elizabeth spoke of Chester in a dispatch of 27 September 1571 as one of her greatest and best merchants trading with the Shah.

=== Last years ===
His last move as alderman, from 1566 to 1573, was to the Langbourn ward, in which stood his house in Lombard Street close by the George Inn. On 2 May 1567 the Senate of the University of Cambridge awarded him an honorary M.A. degree. In 1567 he served out the incomplete term of Draper Mastership for William Beswick (who died in that year), and in November, at St Lawrence Pountney, took to his second wife Beswick's widow Joan, daughter of John Turner of London. This union affirmed their Offley kinship, since Joan's daughter Agnes had married William Offley and Chester's daughter Jane was wife of Richard Offley, Merchant Taylors, both half-brothers of Sir Thomas. He then served his own fifth full term as Master of the Drapers in 1567–68, and lastly in 1568–69 completed the term of Richard Champion, who died in November 1568.

In 1571 he was appointed to the special commission of oyer and terminer for the trial for high treason of John Felton, who had published the Papal bull of Regnans in Excelsis against Queen Elizabeth. Dame Joan died in 1572 and was buried on 23 December in St Lawrence's church beside her first husband. Chester became a Fellow-commoner of his college, and subscribed to a petition to amend the university statutes on 6 May 1572. Soon afterwards he retired from business and resigned from the aldermanry. He devoted his last years to the pursuit of classical and theological learning at the University of Cambridge.

=== Departure ===
The date of his death is not exactly known, and was formerly thought to have been during the 1590s, but is now known to have been before 1574. A litigation noted in the King's Remembrancer, Barons' depositions, dated in the Hilary term of 16 Elizabeth (1574) refers to 'the goods of Sir William Chester deceased, late alderman of the city of London.' (Nicholas Mewes, who became free in 1576, had served William Chester junior: William Wilmer, who had served with one William Chester, completed his term that year with Ambrose Saunders, brother of the martyr Lawrence.) His mansion in Lombard Street, which he had leased to Richard Offley, was later sold to Sir George Barne (who died in 1593) by William Chester, his son and heir. In 1595 a grant of Administration of Sir William's estate was made to his son John Chester. Sir William Chester died at Cambridge, but was buried in London in his vault in St. Edmund's, Lombard Street.

== Family ==
The children of Sir William Chester and his first wife, Elizabeth Lovett, are shown as follows. They had sons:

- William Chester of London, son and heir, Constable of Wisbech Castle, married Judith, daughter and coheir of Anthony Cave of Chicheley, Buckinghamshire. They had one son and heir, Anthony Chester. William and Judith were married in 1558, the year after William was made free of the Draper's Company. Judith (born 1542) was cousin to William on the Lovett side: her grandfather Thomas Lovett (1495–1523) was elder half-brother to William Chester's mother. William and Judith resided mostly in London but Anthony became master of Chicheley, which remained in the Chester family for many generations. Judith died in 1570, and William remarried to Anne, daughter of Robert Frere, of the family of the manor of Blanketts, Claines, Worcestershire: they had two further children.
- Thomas Chester, B.A. in the University of Oxford, was made free of the Draper's Company on 3 October 1560 by patrimony. He was appointed Bishop of Elphin in the reformed Church of Ireland in 1580 or 1582, and died at Killiathan in 1584.
- John Chester, was made free of the Draper's Company on 3 October 1560 by patrimony. In 1664-5 he took part in John Hawkins' slaving voyage to Africa and the Americas. He married in 1566 to Elizabeth. She died without surviving issue and was buried at Quainton, Buckinghamshire in 1593, and John Chester died at St James, Clerkenwell in 1603. John was granted administration of his father's estate in 1595.
- Daniel Chester (living 1568), died unmarried.
- Francis Chester (living 1568), died unmarried.

and daughters:

- Francisca Chester, married (before August 1550) Sir William Chester's apprentice Robert Tempest, citizen and Draper of London, Merchant Adventurer and Merchant of the Staple of Calais, who died without issue in 1551. Among his bequests he left £300 for the foundation of a school for the poor children of Calais. His will is an important source of genealogical information, and he is named in Sir William Chester's inscription on his wife's tomb. Francisca died in 1559, in which year Sir William Chester challenged the claim of Anna Harrison, alias Adeson, Tempest's natural sister, in the administration of Tempest's will.
- Emme Chester, married (January 1562) John Gardener of London, grocer, a colleague of Sir William's in the sugar refinery business.
- Jane Chester, married before 1568 Richard Offley 'the Merchant', Merchant Taylor (Master of that Company in 1572 and 1582), younger half-brother and factor in Calais to Sir Thomas Offley at the time of its loss to the French. Richard was 'a great shipper of wools', and obtained good sales worth £5000 on the eve of the fall. They are said to have had several children who were brought up in godly fashion and in good manners of life, and received instruction from their grandfather Chester. Richard died soon after his brother Sir Thomas and was survived by his wife.
- Susannah Chester, married John Trott of London, citizen and Draper. They had two sons and numerous daughters. John died in 1601 and Susannah survived him.
- Frances Chester married Francis Robinson, citizen and Grocer of London.

== Credit ==
This article incorporates text from a publication now in the public domain: Welch, Charles (1887). "Chester, William". In Stephen, Leslie (ed.). Dictionary of National Biography. Vol. 10. London: Smith, Elder & Co.
