= Canonical institution =

Technical term in Catholic canon law

Canonical institution (from the Latin institutio, from instituere, to establish) is a technical term of the canon law of the Catholic Church, meaning in practice an institution having full recognition and status within the Catholic Church.

== Benefices ==
In its widest signification, canonical institution denotes any manner, in accordance with canon law, of acquiring an ecclesiastical benefice. In its strictest sense, the word denotes the collation of an ecclesiastical benefice by a legitimate authority, on the presentation of a candidate by a third person (institutio tituli collativa). The term is used also for the actual putting in possession of a benefice (institutio corporalis), and for the approbation requisite for the exercising of the ecclesiastical ministry when an authority inferior to the bishop has power to confer an ecclesiastical benefice (institutio auctorisabilis).

== Institutio tituli collativa ==
The institutio tituli collativa (that which gives the title), sometimes also called verbalis (which may be by word of mouth or by writing, as distinguished from the institutio corporalis, or realis), is the act by which an ecclesiastical authority confers a benefice on a candidate presented by a third person enjoying the right of presentation. This occurs in the case of benefices subject to the right of patronage (jus patronatus), one of the principal prerogatives of which is the right of presenting to the bishop a titular for a vacant benefice. It also occurs when, in virtue of a privilege or of a concordat, a chapter, a sovereign, or a government has the right to present to the pope the titular of a bishopric or of an important ecclesiastical office. If the pope accepts the person presented, he bestows the institutio canonica on the titular, The effect of this act is to give the candidate who has been presented (and who until then had only a jus ad rem, i.e. the right to be provided with the benefice) a jus in re or in beneficio, i.e. the right of exercising the functions connected with the benefice and of receiving revenues accruing from it. The right of institution to major benefices rests in the pope, but in the case of minor benefices it may belong to a bishop and his vicar-general, to a vicar capitular, or even to other ecclesiastics, in virtue of a foundation title dating from before the Council of Trent, or of a privilege, or of prescription. In all these cases the bishop has the right to examine the candidate, excepting candidates presented by universities recognized canonically; even this exception does not apply to parishes. Institution ought to be bestowed within the two months following the presentation, in the case of parish churches, but canon law has not specified any fixed time with regard to other benefices. However, if the bishop refuses to grant institution within the time appointed by a superior authority, the latter can make the grant itself.

== Institutio corporalis ==
The institutio corporalis, also called investitura, or installatio, is the putting of a titular in effective possession of his benefice. Whereas canon law permits a bishop to put himself in possession of his benefice (see canonical provision), in the case of minor benefices it requires an actual installation by a competent authority. The bishop may punish any one who takes possession of a benefice on his own authority, and the violent occupation of a benefice in possession of another ecclesiastic entails on the guilty party the loss of all right to that benefice. The right of installation formerly belonged to archdeacons, but is now reserved to the bishop, his vicar-general, or his delegate, ordinarily the dean (decanus christianitatis or foraneus). It is performed with certain symbolical ceremonies, determined by local usage or by diocesan statutes, such, for instance, as a solemn entry into the parish and into the church, the handing over of the church keys, a putting in possession of the high altar of the church, the pulpit, confessional, etc. In some countries there is a double installation: the first by the bishop or vicar-general, either by mere word of mouth, or by some symbolical ceremony, as, for instance, presenting a biretta; the second, which is then a mere ceremony, taking place in the parish and consisting in the solemn entry and other formalities dependent on local custom. In some places custom has even done away with the institutio corporalis properly so called; the rights inherent to the putting in possession are acquired by the new titular to the benefice by a simple visit to his benefice, for instance, to his parish, with the intention of taking possession thereof, provided such visit is made with the authority of the bishop, thus precluding the possibility of self-investiture. When the pope names the titular to a benefice, he always mentions those who are to put the beneficiary in possession.

The following are the effects of the institutio corporalis:

- From the moment he is put in possession the beneficiary receives the revenues of his benefice.
- He enjoys all the rights resulting from the ownership and the possession of the benefice, and, in particular, it is from this moment that the time necessary for a prescriptive right to the benefice counts.
- The possessor can invoke in his favour the provisions of rules 35 and 36 of the Roman Chancery de annali, and de triennali possessione. This privilege has lost much of its importance since the conferring of benefices is now a matter of less dispute than in former times. Formerly, on account of various privileges, and the constant intervention of the Holy See in the collation of benefices, several ecclesiastics were not infrequently named to the same benefice. Should one of them happen to have been in possession of the benefice for a year, it would devolve on the rival claimant to prove that the possessor had no right to the benefice; moreover, the latter was obliged to begin his suit within six months after his nomination to the benefice by the pope, and the trial was to be concluded within a year counting from the day when the actual possessor was cited to the courts (rule 35 of the Chancery). These principles are still in force. The triennial possession guaranteed the benefice to the actual incumbent in all actions in petitorio or in possessorio to obtain a benefice brought by any claimant whatsoever (rule 36 of the Chancery).
- The peaceful possession of a benefice entails ipso facto the vacating of any benefices to which the holder is a titular, but which would be incompatible with the one he holds.
- It is only from the day when bishops and parish priests enter into possession of their benefices that they can validly assist at marriages celebrated in the diocese or in the parish. Furthermore, in some dioceses the statutes declare invalid any exercise of the powers of jurisdiction attached to a benefice, before the actual installation in the benefice.

== Institutio auctorisabilis ==
The institutio auctorisabilis is nothing but an approbation required for the validity of acts of jurisdiction, granted by the bishop to a beneficiary in view of his undertaking the care of souls (cura animarum). It is an act of the same nature as the approbation which a bishop gives members of a religious order for hearing confessions of persons not subject to their authority, and without which the absolution would be invalid; but there is this difference that in the case of the institutio auctorisabilis the approbation relates to the exercise of the ministerial functions taken as a whole. It is the missio canonica indispensable for the validity of acts requiring an actual power of jurisdiction. This institution, which is reserved to the bishop or his vicar-general and to those possessing a quasi-episcopal jurisdiction, is required when the institutio tituli collativa belongs to an inferior prelate, a chapter, or a monastery. The institutio tituli collativa given by the bishop himself implies the institutio auctorisabilis, which, therefore, needs not to be given by a special act.
