= Little Horkesley Priory =

Priory in Essex, England

Coordinates: 51.951552°N 0.851741°E

Little Horkesley Priory was a priory of Cluniac monks in Essex, England.

It was an alien priory, a daughter house of Thetford, Norfolk and dependent on Lewes, Sussex. It was founded before 1127 by Robert Fitz Godebald (Robert of Horkesley) and his wife Beatrice. It became independent from 1376 but was finally dissolved in 1525. The priory church was destroyed by bombing in 1940

== See also ==
- Cluniac priories in Britain
