= Richard Chancellor =

English explorer and navigator (c. 1521 – 1556)

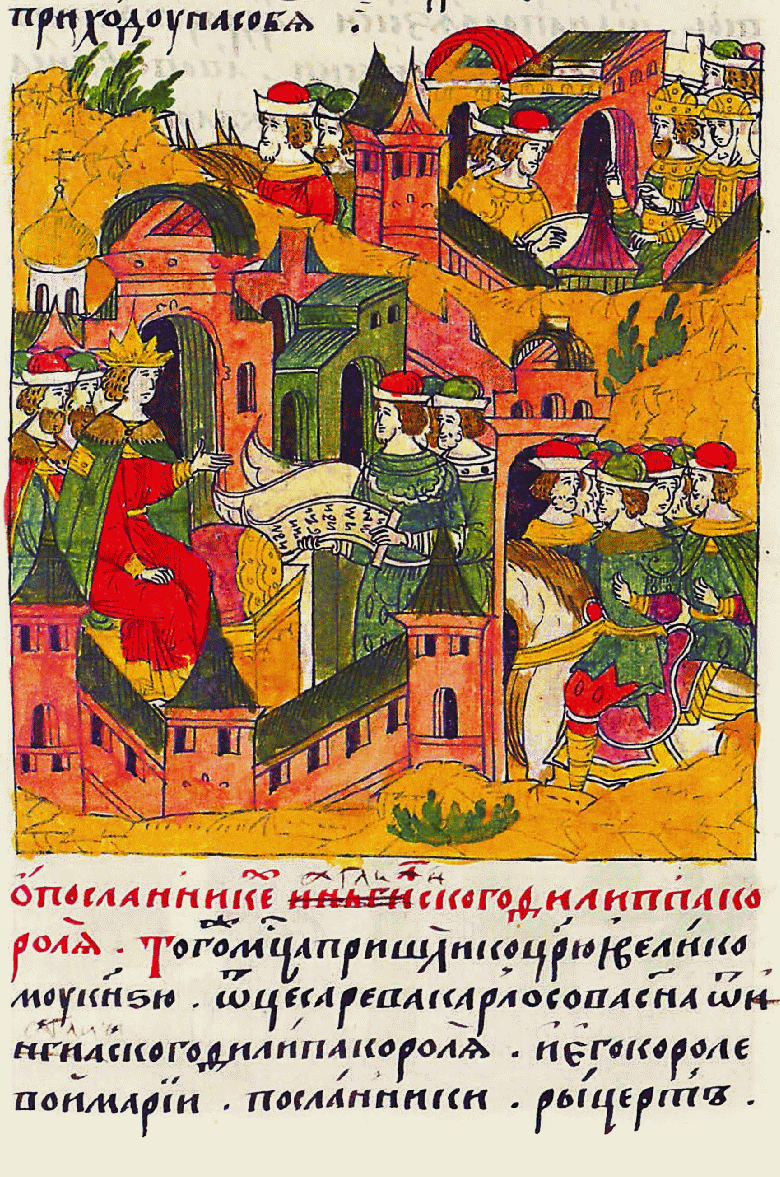
- Chancellor's reception in Moscow, as depicted in the Illustrated Chronicle of Ivan the Terrible
- Born: c. 1521; Bristol
- Died: 10 November 1556

Richard Chancellor (c. 1521 – 10 November 1556) was an English explorer and navigator; the first to penetrate to the White Sea and establish relations with the Tsardom of Russia.

== Life ==
Chancellor, a native of Bristol, was brought up in the household of Sir William Sidney, an influential English gentleman. In 1550 Chancellor sailed as an apprentice pilot to the eastern Mediterranean in the bark Aucher commanded by Roger Bodenham. He acquired additional geographical and maritime proficiency from the explorer Sebastian Cabot and the geographer John Dee. Cabot had always been interested in making a voyage to Asia through the Arctic, and for this purpose an association of London merchants chartered the Company of Merchant Adventurers in 1552–1553, with the Duke of Northumberland as principal patron. They hoped not only to discover a north-east passage but also to find a market for English woollen cloth.

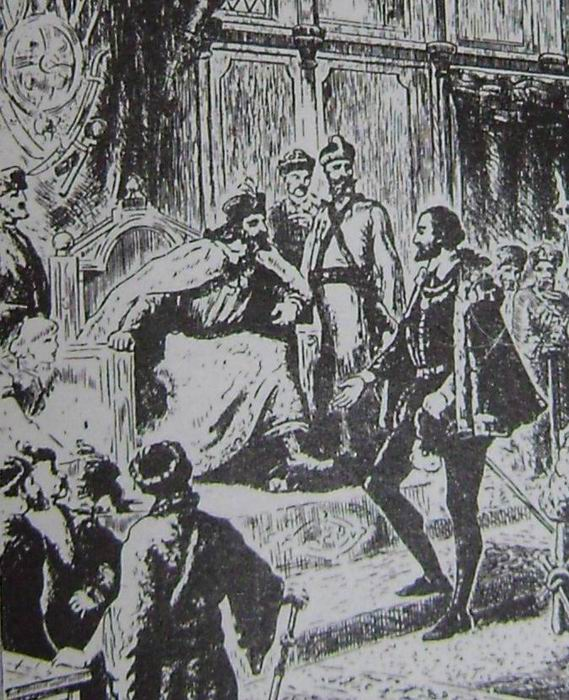
Richard Chancellor (1553)

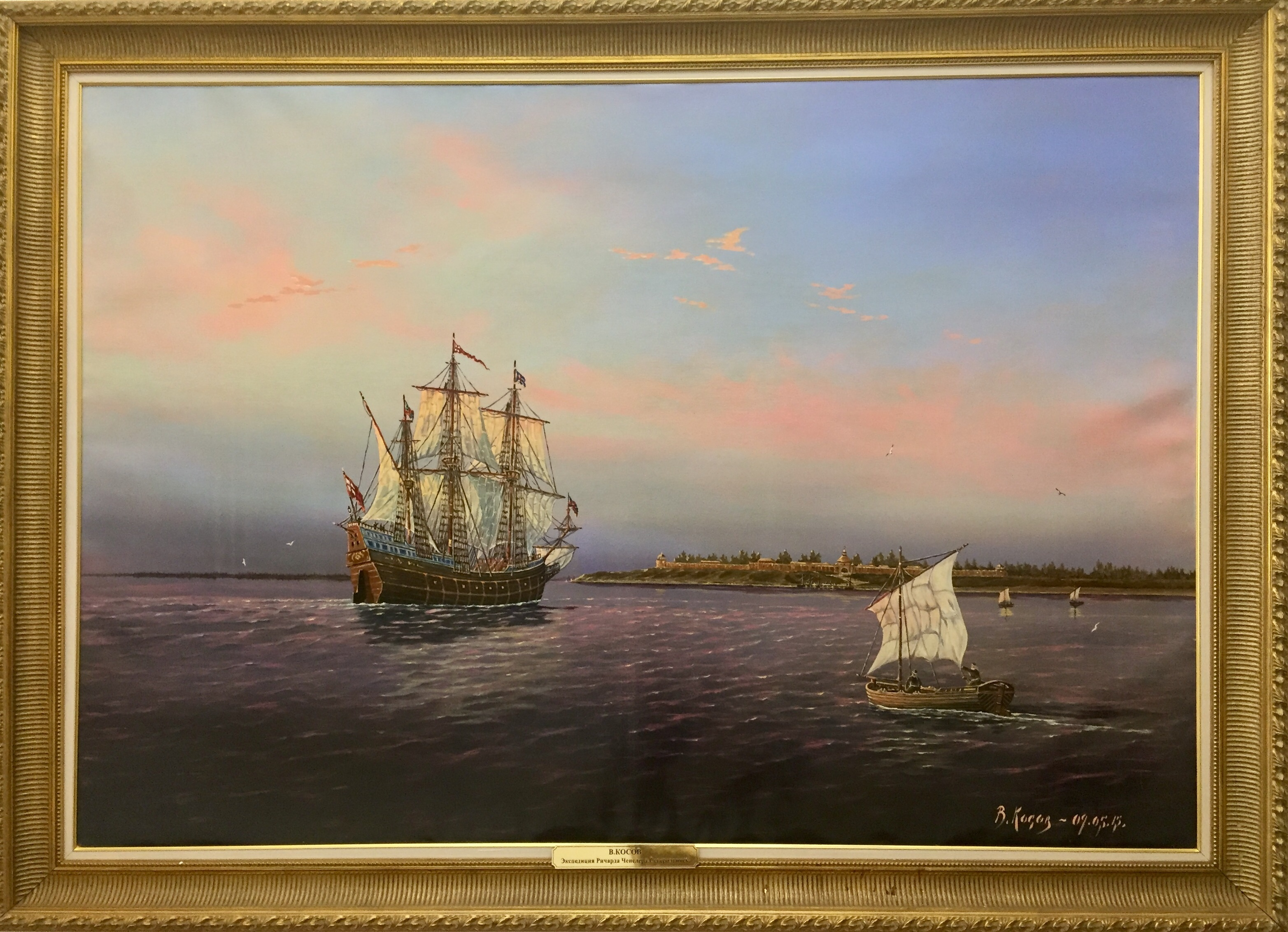
Richard Chancellor's 1553 expedition to Nyonoksa and Yagry V. Kosov 137х198 2015

Sir Hugh Willoughby was given three ships for the search, and Chancellor went as chief navigator and second-in-command. Their orders from Cabot included behaving peaceably towards any people they met and keeping a regular journal. According to David Howarth contrary winds delayed the expedition seriously but they eventually arrived off the North Cape as autumn set in, and were separated by a violent storm; Willoughby, with two ships, sailed east and discovered Novaya Zemlya but died during the winter with all his men on the Kola Peninsula some distance east of Murmansk. The bodies and journals were discovered by Russian fisherman in the spring. Meanwhile, Chancellor noted and named the North Cape and with his ship Edward Bonaventure called at the Norwegian port of Vardø, the last town in Scandinavia before the inhospitable arctic coast of Russia; here they met Scottish fishermen who warned them of the dangers ahead. However continuing eastwards they found the entrance to the White Sea and after obtaining directions from local people dropped anchor at the mouth of the Dvina River, where the port of Archangel now stands.

When Tsar Ivan the Terrible heard of Chancellor's arrival, he immediately invited the exotic guest to visit Moscow for an audience at the royal court. Chancellor made the journey of over 600 miles (over 1000 kilometres) to Moscow by horse-drawn sleigh through snow and ice-covered country. He found Moscow large (much larger than London) and primitively built, most houses being constructed of wood. However, the palace of the tsar was very luxurious, as were the dinners he offered Chancellor. The tsar was pleased to open the sea trading routes with England and other countries, as Russia did not yet have a connection with the Baltic Sea at the time and the entire area was contested by the neighbouring powers of the Polish–Lithuanian Commonwealth and the Swedish Empire. In addition, the Hanseatic League had a monopoly on the trade between Russia and Central and Western Europe. Chancellor was no less optimistic, finding a good market for his English wool, and receiving furs and other Russian goods in return. The Tsar gave him letters for England inviting English traders and promising trade privileges.

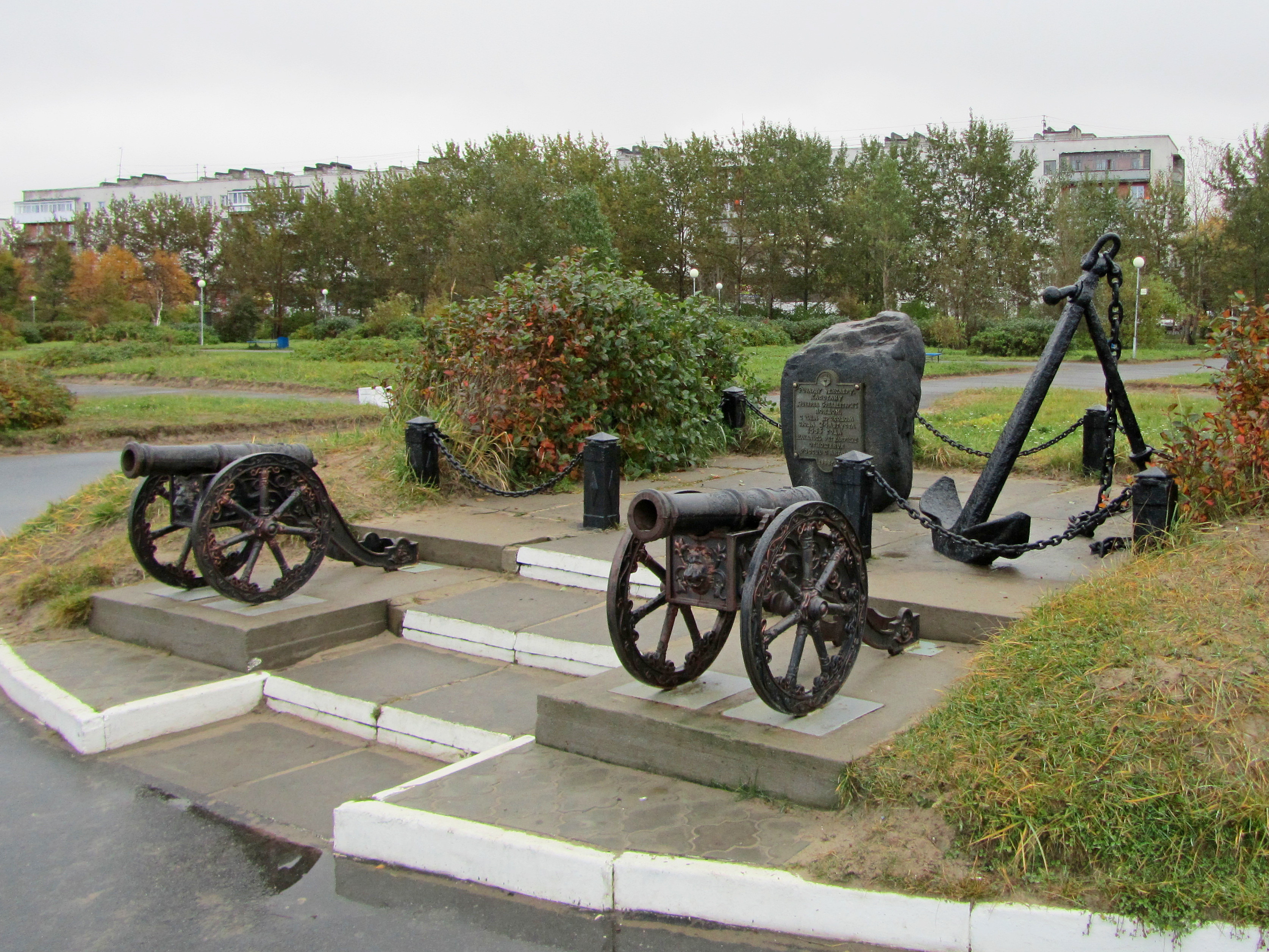
Monument to Richard Chancellor at Yagry Island

When Chancellor returned to England in the summer of 1554, King Edward was dead, and his successor, Mary, had executed Northumberland for attempting to place Lady Jane Grey on the throne. No stigma attached to Chancellor, and the Muscovy Company, as the association was now called, sent him again to the White Sea in 1555. On this voyage he learned what had happened to Willoughby, recovered his papers, and found out about the discovery of Novaya Zemlya. Chancellor spent the summer of 1555 dealing with the tsar, organising trade, and trying to learn how China might be reached by the northern route.

In July 1556 Chancellor departed for home, taking with him the first Russian ambassador to England, Osip Nepeya. The fleet consisted of four ships, the Philip and Mary, the Edward Bonadventure and Willoughby's relaunched ships, the Bona Confidentia and the Bona Esperanza. Along the coast of Norway the weather turned bad and the fleet sought shelter in Trondheim. The Bona Esperanza sank and the Bona Confidentia appeared to enter the fjord but was never heard of again. Only the Philip and Mary successfully wintered in Trondheim and arrived in London in April 1557. The Edward Bonadventure did not attempt to enter the fjord, instead they reached the Scottish coast and were driven ashore by a storm at Pitsligo near Aberdeen on 10 November 1556. Most of the crew, including Chancellor, lost their lives. Only the Russian envoy and a few others survived and reached London the following year.

== In fiction ==
Chancellor appears as a major character in the novel The Ringed Castle (1971), fifth of the six novels in Dorothy Dunnett's historical fiction series, The Lymond Chronicles.

== See also ==
- List of foreign observers of Russia
- Society of Merchant Venturers
