= Martin Bowes =

Civic dignitary and treasurer

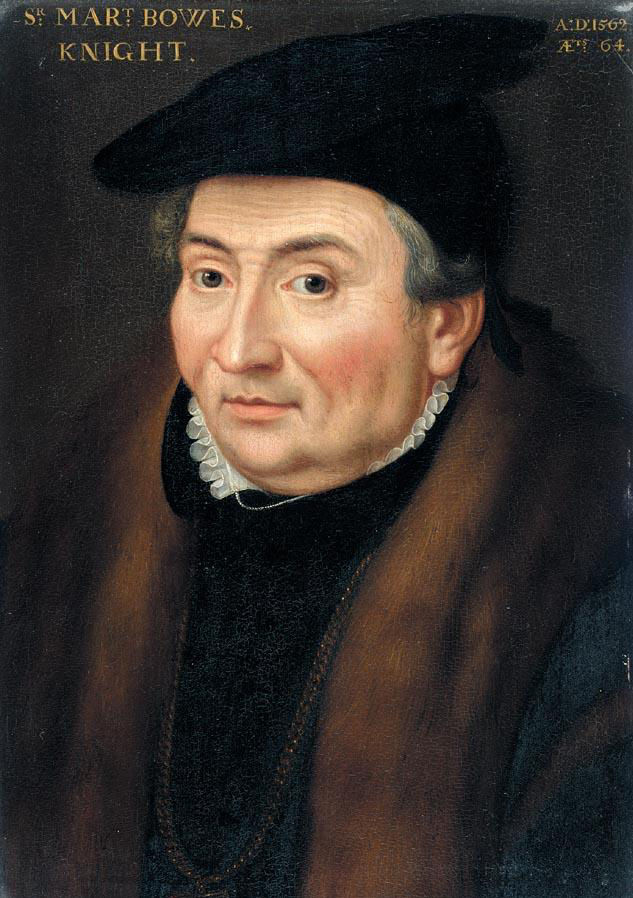
Sir Martin Bowes in 1562 (Broke Hall portrait)

Sir Martin Bowes (1496/97 – 1566) was a very prominent and active civic dignitary of Tudor London whose career continued through the reigns of Henry VIII, Edward VI, Mary I, and Elizabeth I. Born into the citizenry of York, Bowes was apprenticed in London and made his career at the Royal Mint, as a master-worker and under-treasurer, and personally implemented the debasement of English currency which became a fiscal imperative in the later reign of Henry.

Through a lifetime's association with the Worshipful Company of Goldsmiths, of which he was many times Upper Warden, he progressed to be a Sheriff of London in 1540–1541 and to be Lord Mayor of London for 1545–46, the last full term of mayoralty in Henry's reign. A survivor through the changes of national religious policy (and attendant persecutions), in the term of his mayoralty fell the second interrogation and condemnation of the Protestant Anne Askew, who was burnt at the stake for heresy in 1546. In 1547 and 1553, (during the reign of Edward VI), and later in 1554 and 1555 and again in 1559, he represented the City of London in Parliament.

The Catholic Queen Mary was dependent upon the stability, wealth and compliance of the City in its central role in the governance and commerce of the capital, while the City itself, desirous of reform, looked to its elders for guidance and opportunity through the dangerous alterations of policy. Bowes's flexibility in religious matters, his reforms of the London Hospitals and his continuing involvement with them, his various benefactions (not least to the Langbourne ward of which he was alderman for twenty years), and his long representation of his Company's interests, which he carried safely through to the Elizabethan era, characterize one of the great (if controversial) London city fathers of his age.

== Origins ==
Martin Bowes was born into a family well-established in the civic life of the city of York in earlier generations. The merchant William Bowes the elder, MP for York in 1413 and 1417, was Lord Mayor of York in 1417 and 1428, and in around 1430 rebuilt the parish church of St Cuthbert at Peaseholme Green; in 1443 a younger William Bowes was also mayor. Reputedly, Martin was born in the old timbered house, the Bowes family home in Peaseholme Green, at the sign of the Black Swan.

Although Bowes's father Thomas Bowes was not engaged in civic office, he was probably the same Thomas Bowes, goldsmith, to whom the Freedom of the City of York was granted in 1498. By his own account Martin Bowes, who was born in the parish of St Cuthbert's, was brought up by his parents in York until the age of 14, when (in 1511) he was sent up to London as a youth of limited means, and was apprenticed to the citizen and Goldsmith, Robert Amadas (died 1532).

His master was a Deputy Master of the Mint, and Master of the Jewel Office, and this career path for Martin was no doubt foreshadowed by a former Thomas Bowes, also born in Peaseholme, who had died in 1479 while holding office in the London Mint. The Goldsmiths' Company had produced several luminaries and benefactors a generation previously, including Sir Edmund Shaa and Sir John Shaa, Thomas Wood and Henry Worley, and also John Mundy who, having witnessed the Evil May Day riots in Cheapside in 1517 (as Bowes must have done), served as Lord Mayor in 1522. Martin Bowes became a liveryman of the Goldsmiths in 1524/25, immediately following the obit of Sir Edmund Shaa.

== In Henry's time ==
=== The London mint ===
In 1526 (by which year Bowes had already embarked upon his first marriage, to Cecily Eliott) Amadas appointed Bowes his deputy at the Royal Mint, of which he became one of the three or four master-workers. These men, together with the Treasurer William Blount, 4th Baron Mountjoy, were entitled to equal shares of the Mint's profit. The arrangement caused friction between the master-workers and their superior, who claimed to have been denied his fair share. The official allowances paid to the master-workers were considerably lower than they had formerly been, during the Yorkist period, and the managers made up for this by "seizing every opportunity to make the Mint pay". In 1530 Lord Mountjoy attempted to hold the two Deputy Masters, Robert Amadas and Ralph Rowlett (died 1543), to account, but they brought counter-claims at law: by 1533, Amadas having died (buried in St Mary Woolnoth), Mountjoy had resigned his patent and Bowes and Rowlett became joint Masters of the Mint.

=== Civic opportunities ===
Bowes was, meanwhile, advancing in civic affairs, progressing through two Warden-ships of the Goldsmiths' Company in 1532–33 and 1534–36, and in 1536, having served as auditor, was chosen an alderman for the Aldgate ward. Accepting this, his petition was granted that he should not be called upon to serve as Sheriff for three years to come. His status as alderman gave him a special importance within the Company of Goldsmiths, and he served his first term as Prime Warden (a role which he resumed under Edward, Mary and Elizabeth) in 1537–38. He had built, and now occupied, that distinguished residence mentioned by John Stow in Lombard Street, near the parish church of St Mary Woolnoth, among the "diverse faire houses, namely one with a verie faire forefront towards the streete, builded by Sir Martin Bowes, Goldsmith." The back gate opened towards the conduit in Cornhill. In 1539/40 the advowson of this church, which had belonged to the Priory and convent of St Helen (Bishopsgate), was granted to him, and later remained to his descendants.

=== Wives and lands ===
His first wife Cicely having died leaving him with two, perhaps three sons, she was buried at St Mary Woolnoth: Bowes remarried by 1538 to Anne Barrett of Aveley (Essex), upon whom he sired several more children through the 1540s, including Joan (1541), Francis (1542), William (1543/44), another Francis (1545), Charity (1548) and Henry (1550). However, in 1541 he lost a daughter Elizabeth, and in 1543 he lost his ward Elizabeth Strong, a gentlewoman; one Francis was buried on the day of the second Francis' baptism.

By grants and alienations of land, Bowes was already acquiring estates in Kent during the 1530s. He had lands at Plumstead, having been granted Suffolk Place Farm (formerly property of Charles Brandon) at Bostall from the king in 1535/36: by which means Plumstead, Bostall and Woolwich later descended in capite to George Barne. By the king's grant he also had the manor of North Ash (at Ash, Axtane Hundred), with the advowson of Ash which had belonged to the Order of St John of Jerusalem (suppressed 1532), and the manor of Halywell, formerly a possession of the Priory of St John Baptist at Shoreditch.

=== Shrievalty, 1540–1541 ===
In 1540, transferring to the Castle Baynard ward, he was appointed Sheriff together with the eminent citizen and Grocer William Laxton, in the mayoralty of Sir William Roche. It was a big year for executions (an important part of a sheriff's work): although the beheading of Thomas Cromwell and the royal marriage to Katherine Howard had already occurred before these sheriffs took office at Michaelmas, it is particularly recorded that Bowes and Laxton as Sheriffs attended Lord Dacre of the South at the Tower of London on 29 July 1541 and accompanied him on foot to Tyburn where he was to be hanged. As the summer of 1541 approached, the executions of the Countess of Salisbury and of Lord Leonard Gray took place at the Tower. During the course of that year Bowes received knighthood.

He was again Upper Warden of the Goldsmiths, serving for two years together in 1540–1542, and in 1542 transferred to the ward of Farringdon Within. During this period he was negotiating with the king for a reform to the governance of the company, which was still constituted as "Four Custodes and the Commonalty", and the progress of these discussions was brought before the Wardens on various occasions. In 1542 his sons Thomas and Martyn Bowes were sworn to membership of the company: the two brothers had a double marriage at St Mary Woolnoth on 1 September 1544, Thomas marrying Thomasin Wilkinson and Martyn taking to wife Frances Scrope. The children of Martyn Bowes jnr., Thomas, Anne, Patience and Joan, were baptized in the parish during the later 1540s.

=== Coinage debasement and reforms ===
Whereas Henry VII had maintained close control over the Mints, under Henry VIII the Crown "did little more than making the ends meet", leaving the master-workers to manage their own work. Investigations leading to reorganization of the Mint in 1544 showed that Bowes and Ralph Rowlett (died 1543) were responsible for systematic unauthorized debasement of silver supplied by the Crown. Thousands of pounds in "surplus" coinage remained unaccounted for; but Bowes survived the scrutiny. Official indentures from 1542/43 forwards, directed to Bowes and his officers, specified the required degrees of adulteration of the metal. The debasement of French coinage had resulted in large quantities of finer English currency being exported, so by this method the price of English gold and silver was raised.

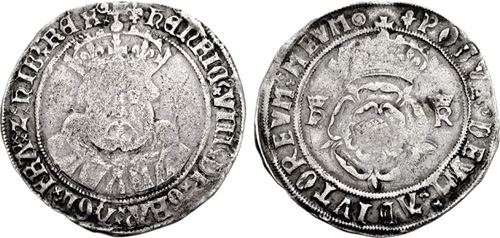
Debased testoon 1544–1547

Bowes emerged strongly in the reform of the Mint. He was promoted to under-treasurer in March 1544, retaining control of the Tower Mint (Tower I), though a second under-treasurer, Stephen Vaughan, was also named in the indenture of May 1544 in response to the need for increasing capacity. However, Vaughan, a special Crown agent in the Low Countries, was detained by his duties there until November 1546. Therefore, in April 1545 Thomas Knight was appointed under-treasurer to manage a second Tower Mint (II), and was named with Bowes and Vaughan in the indentures of 1545–1547. Knight died in February 1548, and Vaughan then became active until his own death in 1549 (the Exchequer receiving the balance of his moneying profits from his executor John Gwynneth) when he was replaced by Sir Nicholas Throckmorton. Through these changes Bowes remained in control of what was now the authorized debasement of the English currency.

In 1544–1551 the Tower I facility managed by Bowes produced silver coinage valued at £957,067 and gold coins valued at £767,362, or 43% of the total national output (£3,985,591). Bowes was responsible for around one quarter of the debased testoon production, in which £385,000 worth of good silver currency were reworked into £547,000 (face value) of "base testoon" currency. In total, he generated around a third of Crown's profits from the debasement of currency – £421,693 (33% on top of input metal value, or 24% out of face value produced). His production overheads, at 1/26 of net profits, were higher than those of Thomas Knight (Tower II), because Bowes bore the costs of management, engravers and potmakers for both facilities.

== Mayoralty, 1545–1546 ==
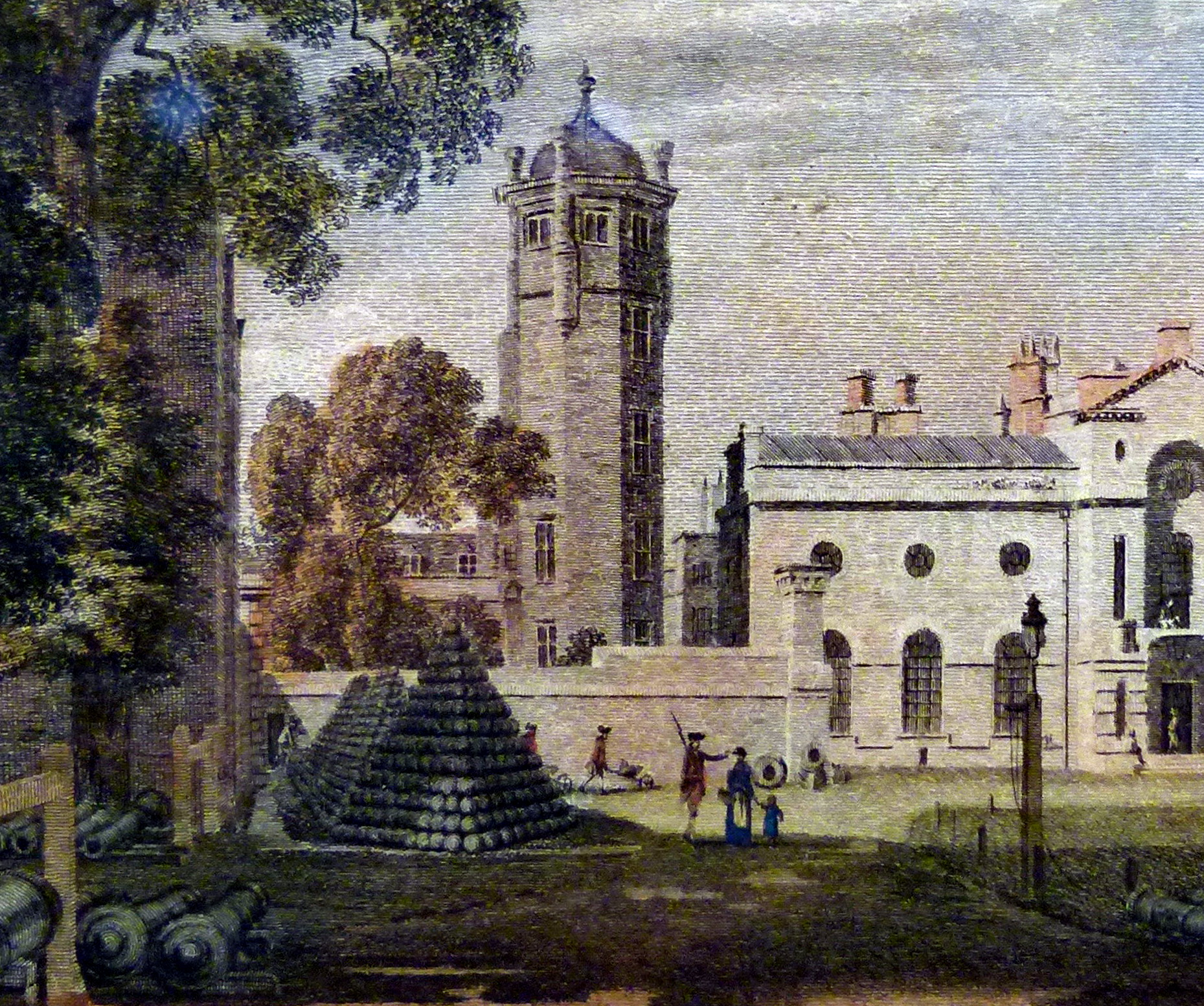
Tower Place in Woolwich, built by Bowes in the 1540s

Sir William Laxton having served as Lord Mayor of London for 1544–1545, Bowes succeeded him, transferring at the same time to the Langbourn ward: the election on St Edward's Day (13 October) 1545 was the occasion when the new gold mayoral Livery collar presented to the city by the late Sir John Alleyn was worn, for the first time, by Laxton as outgoing mayor. The month of June 1546 was a particularly busy one. Bowes, fearing food shortages in the city, had a large quantity of corn imported from overseas, which arrived in London in that month. At the same time the king required the city to take in 20,000 quarters of barley and rye which he had laid in against his foreign wars, and Bowes was obliged to raise a great sum of money to pay for it, and to commandeer every mill within seven miles of the city for the grinding thereof.

In 1546 Bowes added to his Kentish landholdings by acquiring for himself the manor and advowson of North Cray, Kent, from Sir Roger Cholmeley: to this the king added the manor and advowson of the adjoining parish of Ruxley (in the Hundred of Ruxley), and other lands in Kent, in capite, to be held by fealty only. These lands were disgavelled early in the succeeding reign.

=== Proclamation of peace ===
However, on 13 June a solemn peace was proclaimed in the city for the Treaty of Ardres, involving a great ceremony in St Paul's in which the Mayor was prominent, with full representation of the Crafts, and a heraldic and ecclesiastic procession into Cheap to the Cornhill and to Leadenhall corner, and so back to St Paul's. (It was the last great show of the rich crosses and copes in London, for they were soon afterwards called into the King's Wardrobe.) Fires were lit in the street, banquets held, and hogsheads of wine and beer with spicebread were set out before the Lord Mayor's gate for passers-by to enjoy. The next day was a sumptuous feast at the Lord Mayor's place, where Oudard du Biez, Marshal of France and captain of the fortress at Boulogne, and other French Captains, were the guests. On that occasion, while "at waffers and ipocras", Bowes (to illustrate his authority) chose alderman Richard Jerveys to be sheriff for the next year, and drank the health of one of the current sheriffs who was present with his wife: which much impressed the French Captain.

=== Midsummer Watch ===
The Court of Aldermen permanently set aside the Midsummer Watch procession, but Sir Martin Bowes performed it at his own expense on Midsummer Eve, riding to St Peter's with a hundred constables with cresset lights and bearers going before him, all his servants and officers in cassocks and jerkins of yellow satin, three squires in yellow damask, the sword-bearer riding in a cassock of yellow velvet: the mayor's footmen in doublets of yellow velvet embroidered with his arms on the breast and back, the two sheriffs and their officers following, and lastly forty more constables with their lights: "which was a proper sight". The Sheriffs were George Barne and Ralph Alleyn. The Goldsmiths were put to some expense during the mayoralty as it was necessary for Bowes to be accompanied by his sheriffs and other officers at corporate events, such that in 1547 they stipulated that these additional payments should not be taken as a precedent except when a member of the company should be Mayor.

=== Anne Askew ===
On 18 June 1546 the Protestant gentlewoman Anne Askew was brought once more to the Guildhall of London to be arraigned for heresy, before a daunting board of ecclesiastical and secular justices led by Sir Martin Bowes. She had been acquitted, after a period of imprisonment during which she was questioned by Laxton, on a similar charge in the previous year, but had now resumed her offence by perfecting herself in faith. She was taken to the Tower on 19 June, and her inquisition and torture followed, ending in her burning for heresy at West Smithfield on 17 July. This was the notorious occasion of her interrogation under torture on the rack, not only in the presence of Chancellor Wriothesley and Richard Rich, but actually at their own hands. Her denial of the Real Presence, her refusal to believe that God was in the piece of bread which they called the Sacrament, left her condemnation inevitable under the prevailing system of law. The secular authorities had responsibility for pronouncing the condemnation and carrying out the sentence.

=== Welfare ===
As Lord Mayor, Martin Bowes had imposed a tax of two fifteenths on the inhabitants of London to bring a supply of fresh water from Hackney, and an improved supply was brought from Finsbury by the end of his term. He sought to arrange with the King for the purchase of St Bartholomew's Hospital in Smithfield, and the former London Greyfriars, for the purpose of rebuilding the former in its continuing role as Hospital, and founding Christ's Hospital on the site of the latter. He was succeeded as Mayor by Henry Huberthorn at Michaelmas 1546. The grant to the Mayor and citizens of these two sites and of the Hospital of Bedlam was agreed on 27 December 1546 and issued on 13 January following, the reform of the Court of Augmentations and of the Court of General Surveyors of the King's Lands ("in which there has been great disorder") having intervened on 1 January 1546/47.

These were the King's last days. After Henry's death at the end of January 1546/7, in February his body was borne from London to Windsor. The procession rested a night at Sion House. Ten Aldermen, Sir William Laxton and Sir Martin Bowes each with a retinue of four and the others with three, all in their black coats, rode in the company, their harness and bridles muffled in black cloth.

== Edwardian and Marian dignitary ==
Bowes kept his cloak for the ward of Langbourn for another twenty years, until his death. As Edward VI took the throne, Bowes was chosen one of the four MPs to represent London in the parliament of 1547–1552, and was returned again for its successor parliament in March 1553.

=== Iconoclasm ===
Bowes made his own distinct contribution to the iconoclasm, or dismantling of superstitious uses then enacted. Appointed a commissioner for chantries in London, Westminster and Middlesex in 1546, in October 1547 at an assembly of the Goldsmiths he was instructed by them to break up the company's image of its patron, St Dunstan, and to sell it for the best profit, and also to have the company's standing cup (with an image of St Dunstan on its lid) broken up and converted into some other piece of plate. A Chantry Certificate for St Mary Woolnoth for 1 January 1547/48 declares a rent charge of £13.13s.04d (for the maintenance of a priest) going out of "a capital messuage in Lumbard Street wherein Sir Marten Bowes, Knight, inhabiteth." Bowes made his first presentation to St Mary Woolnoth in April 1549 in Humfry Edwards, M.A. (of the University of Oxford), who was installed by Bishop Bonner.

He was again Senior Warden for two years in 1549–1551, and in September 1549 presented the City of York with a ceremonial sword, "a fayre sworde with a sheathe of crymeson velvet garnyshyd with perle and stone sett uppon sylver and gylte", taking the opportunity to recall his early years and upbringing there. (The Bowes sword is still held by the mayor and commonalty of York and is displayed in the Mansion House there: it was frequently depicted in portraits of the Lords Mayors.) His term as under-treasurer of the Tower I Mint concluded at the king's request in January 1550/51, when he was persuaded to pay £10,000 to balance his account, but was also granted a continuance of his fee of £200 per annum as a life pension. The debasement policy was then discontinued. The detachment of the Livery Companies' chantries and other religious foundations from their superstitious uses went on through the same period.

=== Hospital foundation ===
Appointed Treasurer of St Bartholomew's Hospital in 1547, in seeking to fund his hospital projects he had the tombs of the Greyfriars utterly ransacked for their stone slabs and brass plates. Sir Martin Bowes and Sir Andrew Judd headed a great meeting of hospital governors in October 1552 at Christ's Hospital: he also headed a deputation, accompanied by Bishop Ridley, to petition the king for the use of the Bridewell Palace to provide shelter for vagrants and mendicants, against whom severe prohibitions had been proclaimed in the king's first year. King Edward VI's Foundation Charter of the hospitals of Christ, Bridewell and St Thomas was issued on 26 June 1553.

John Stow, having mentioned how 400 poor fatherless children were admitted to Christ Church Hospital in November 1552, then listed more than two pages of despoiled monuments at the Greyfriars, starting with the foundress Lady Margaret (1317/18), wife of Edward I, and concluding: "All these and five times so many more have bin buried there, whose Monuments are wholly defaced: for there were 9 Tombes of Alablaster and Marble, invironed with Strikes of Iron in the Quire, and one Tombe in the body of the Church, also coped with iron, all pulled downe, besides seven-score gravestones of Marble, all sold for 50 pounds, or thereaboutes, by sir Martin Bowes, Goldsmith and Alderman of London..."

At the time of the succession crisis in 1553, Bowes warned the assembly of the Goldsmiths not to talk or meddle with the Queen's affairs.

=== A civic funeral ===
Late in 1553, when the succession had been decided in favour of Queen Mary, and Sir George Barne's mayoralty was drawing to a close, Dame Anne Bowes died and was accorded a full heraldic funeral on 22 October, described by Henry Machyn. The house, the street and the church of St Mary Woolnoth were hung with black cloth decorated with armorial bearings. The Heralds accompanied 100 men and women in gowns in the procession: great gilt candlesticks, tapers and branch-lights were borne along, with the company of priests and the singing clerks, leading the corpse with four pennons of arms around her and 12 servants bearing torches. The chief mourners followed, and after them the Lord Mayor with his swordbearer, Sir Henry Huberthorn and Sir Rowland Hill, many other mourners, and lastly the Craft of the Goldsmiths. Having sung the dirige in the evening, on the morrow was the mass, the sermon, and the dinner.

=== Status and acquiescence ===
Bowes did not sit in the winter parliament of 1553, but he was returned again for London in April 1554 and again in November of that year. Dame Anne leaving him with several children, in 1554 he remarried to Elizabeth Harlow, widow of the assay-master at the Tower and Southwark mints William Billingsley, citizen and Haberdasher, who had died in 1553. Elizabeth had sons including Henry Billingsley, the third son (then studying in Cambridge), who later translated the works of Euclid and became Lord Mayor of London. There was at least one son, William Bowes, from her marriage to Sir Martin, and he was baptized on 8 December 1556. From 1553 Bowes entered upon his longest term as Upper Warden of the Goldmiths, holding for consecutive years through to 1557, and then intermitting only for one year. During this term he continued also as a Member of Parliament for London in Mary's time, sitting in the parliaments of November 1554 and of October–December 1555.

Bowes was apparently adaptable to the variations of religious policy. In London he had his own chaplain, John Siddell, who died in October 1557 and was buried at St Mary Woolnoth. In August 1556 Bowes had caused the rood, the figures of St Mary and St John and the Cross in that church to be painted and gilded, at his own expense: at Easter 1557 and in following years he gave a textile of cloth of gold, with four fair gilt buttons, for the Sacrament. An original letter survives, dated February 1556/57, in which Bowes thanks the Lord Mayor and Aldermen of York for their approval (signified in December 1556) of his plan to found a perpetual chantry in the church of St Cuthbert's at Peaseholme. In May 1557 Bowes presented John Morris to the rectory of St Mary Woolnoth, which was vacant through Edwards's death. In that year, also, he obtained by petition to Cardinal Pole a faculty to demolish his church of Ruxley in Kent and to unite its parish with that of North Cray.

At the indictment (but not the condemnation) of Francis and Edmund Verney for their part in the Henry Dudley conspiracy against Mary, held before Sir William Garrard as Lord Mayor at the London Guildhall on 11 June 1556, Sir William Laxton, Sir Martin Bowes and Sir Andrew Judd also sat as justices. Laxton died soon afterwards, devoting his last energies to the foundation of Oundle School.

=== Hospitals 1557 ===
At a General Court held at Christ's Hospital on 27 September 1557, in the mayoralty of Sir Thomas Offley and under the authority of the Mayor, commonalty and citizens of the City of London, the governors of St Bartholomew's, Christ's, the Bridewell and St Thomas's Hospitals agreed that the Hospital of St Bartholomew should be united with the others; that for the government of these hospitals Sir Martin Bowes should be Controller General and Sir Andrew Judd Surveyor General; and that three aldermen, a treasurer and eight other citizens named in their agreement were to be governors for each of the individual hospitals. On the next day the Ordinances and Rules for the governance of the hospitals, which had been devised by Sir Martin Bowes and Sir Rowland Hill assisted by various other city leaders, were read before the court, entered into record, and ordered to be put into execution. The arrangements so continued down to 1564, when on 21 September (St Matthew's Day) a President, Treasurer and other governors were chosen at Christ's Hospital for each of the hospitals, after which elections were kept annually.

== Elizabethan ==
In 1558 Martin Bowes embarked on his final, four-year term of service as Upper Warden of the Goldsmiths' Company. He did not sit in the parliament of 1558, but following its automatic dissolution in the second session on 17 November 1558, owing to Queen Mary's death, on 6 December following he was summoned to the first parliament of Queen Elizabeth I's reign, which sat from 23 January to 8 May 1559. In its aim to re-establish a Protestant religious statehood, the new Act of Supremacy 1558 and Act of Uniformity 1558 were passed (those of Henry VIII having been repealed by Queen Mary), which became the foundation of the Elizabethan Religious Settlement. This was Bowes's last parliamentary term.

=== St Mary Woolnoth ===
In the meantime his newly presented rector for St Mary Woolnoth had died, and on 30 November 1558 his replacement, Miles Gerard, was installed by Edmund Bonner (who hung on as Bishop of London until 1560). Little time was lost in removing the roodloft (and presumably the recently repainted and gilded figures), the timber of which was delivered in 1560, at Bowes's order, to the governors of the Bridewell and Bethlehem Hospitals, which had been brought under united administration in 1557. The brass candlesticks and the Latin service-books were sold, with the approval of the congregation, a table of the Ten Commandments was set up, and in May 1562, at Bowes's bidding, the old leaden organ pipes were sold off, 102 lbs weight at twopence the pound. This however was not wholesale destruction, but rather a renovation of the existing organ. In April 1561 the child choristers of St Paul's were brought in to assist the church choir at the marriage of Lady Bowes's daughter Cicely Billingsley. Cicely's sister Elizabeth Billingsley had died in late February 1560/61.

Bowes wrote again to the Mayor and aldermen of York in 1561, setting aside his project for a chantry (which was not now possible), and asking them to apply his £60 endowment to the welfare of the poor instead: to this they assented.

=== The Bowes Cup, and other gifts ===
It is as a civic figure, the continuing alderman for Langbourn ward, Comptroller-General of the Hospitals, and Upper Warden of the Goldsmiths's Company, that Bowes features most prominently in his last years. In 1559 the Queen addressed a Proclamation to the Company concerning its apparel, reforms and other matters, which Bowes was particular in advising them to weigh most carefully. In the following year, it was agreed that the Wardens of the company should be chosen on the feast day of St Dunstan by the use of garlands, to which end Alderman Bowes had given them four fair garlands of crimson velvet, garnished with silver and gold and set with pearls and stones. At the same time he gave them "a fair silver gilt standing cup of 80 ounces, with beryl in the body and the cover, with a mannekin on the cover holding an escutcheon bearing Bowes's arms in an annealed [enamelled] plate of gold".

A standing cup now still in existence, topped by the mannekin with armorial escutcheon, is among the company's finest plate. It does not much resemble the standing cup shown in the company's portrait of Sir Martin, which may be merely a token representation. The existing cup is reputed to be a "Coronation Cup", the unique vessel from which the monarch drank during the coronation feast, which by tradition was presented to the Lord Mayor, who customarily served the monarch as Chief Butler on that occasion. Henry VIII, for example, had presented such a cup to Stephen Jenyns at the feast of 1509, who was assisted by twelve men of the Livery Companies: he presented another to the King's Champion. Bowes himself was not Lord Mayor at the time of any of the coronations: his mayoralty ended about three months before the coronation of Edward VI (February 1547). William Chaffers stated that Bowes was Butler at Queen Elizabeth's coronation. The cup itself is dated in catalogues to 1554.

During the later 1550s and early 1560s Bowes was in negotiation with the Goldsmiths to arrange their administration of a number of benefactions which he intended to make by his will (see "Charitable bequests", below).

=== Civic matters ===
Elizabeth's coinage reforms of 1561 were supervised (under Sir Edmund Peckham, High Treasurer of the Mint) by her Comptroller (1559) and Under-Treasurer (from 1561), the Goldsmith Thomas Stanley, who as Assay Master had advised on standards in 1551 as the debasement was halted. Elizabeth was suspicious of her advisers, including her coinage commissioners the Marquess of Winchester and Sir Richard Sackville, while Secretary Cecil and Sir Thomas Parry (Comptroller of the Household) advised Sir William Hewett, stamping existing currency with marks of standard, and Thomas Lodge in managing the Easterling moneyers.

Bowes, Prime Warden (and presiding genius) of the Goldsmiths but closely associated with the debasement which the present reforms sought to unravel, was no doubt present at most of the great civic events, but he is particularly noticed by Machyn at the Grocers' Company feast on 16 June 1561, in company with (among others) the Lord Mayor William Chester, Sir Roger Cholmeley, Sir John Lyon, Sir William Hewett, Sir William Garrard and Thomas Lodge, a robust gathering of mayors and luminaries. He presided at the Goldsmiths' feast on 30 June following, with "dyvers worshephull gentyllmen and gentyllwomen."

On 5 November 1561 he was among the principal mourners, including also Sir Richard Lee, Sir Thomas Offley, Sir William Cordell and alderman Richard Chamberlain (constituted Master of the Ironmongers' Company in their 1560 Charter), at the heraldic funeral procession of Sir Rowland Hill, at St Stephen Walbrook, followed by a dinner at the Mercers' Hall.

In June 1562 the Lord Mayor, Sir William Harpur and the two sheriffs dined with Sir Martin Bowes and alderman Edward Gylbert at the Goldsmiths' feast. They met again on 1 July 1562 at the Merchant Taylors' feast, together with the Earl of Sussex and the Earl of Kildare, Sir Thomas White, Sir Thomas Offley, Sir William Hewett and others. On 6 August 1562 Sir Roger Cholmeley, Sir Richard Sackville, Sir William Hewett, Sir Martin Bowes and Sir William Garrard were among the principal justices sitting in the Guildhall for the arraignment of seven men for forging coin, four of whom were condemned to death. Whether dining or judging, they sat together.

== Charitable bequests ==
It appears that Bowes appointed two trustees during the 1550s, both members of the Goldsmiths' Company, to manage various bequests which he intended should be administered by the company after his own death. Both, however, predeceased him, leaving wills containing instructions for the performance of the trusts which Bowes had reposed in them.

=== Southwood: The "Remembrance" ===
The first of these was William Southwood, whose will dated 23 October 1557 was proved in 1560. Through him, Bowes had left messuages, lands and tenements in Scalding Alley (in St Mildred in the Poultry) worth £16.13s.04d per annum, and rents from tenements in St Matthew's Alley, Westcheap (St Matthew Friday Street) worth £1.13s.2d to the Goldsmiths' Company. This was to provide for a learned preacher to preach an annual sermon in St Mary Woolnoth on or near St. Martin's Day (11 November), for what was called "Sir Martin Bowes's Remembrance". The preacher was to have 6s.8d; four Wardens of the Company and 12 of the Assistants were to attend, having 1s.4d and 1s. each respectively: the clerk and beadle were to have 1s.4d, the clerk was to toll the bell for 8d, and the renters, who had 2s. each, were to arrange a dinner costing £3. The churchwardens were given 9s. year for a potation (a "drynkyng").

Furthermore, one almsman (called "Sir Martin Bowes's almsman") was to be kept forever at Goldsmiths' Hall, to be given 1s.4d per week, and 7s. towards his blue gown every three years. The parson and churchwardens of St Mary Woolnoth were to have £2 a year to distribute as twelve halfpenny-loaves to twelve poor parishioners each Sunday, and 10s. yearly for reparations to the church. Two pounds per year each was similarly to be given by the company to St Mary's church at Woolwich and to St James's church at North Cray for distribution in loaves. The surplus of this bequest was for the Wardens and commonalty of the company for reparations, and for maintenance of their poor. The "Remembrance of Sir Martin Bowes" began to be held during his lifetime, after the making of his will. It was held on 18 November 1563, 13 November 1564 and 12 November 1565.

=== Mundie: the Langbourne fifteenths ===
The will of Roger Mundie, dated 12 August 1562, also a grantee in trust for Sir Martin Bowes, gave to the Wardens and commonalty of the Goldsmiths a great messuage or tenement, with stables, courts, gardens and hereditaments, in St Botolph-without-Bishopsgate, together with 22 gardens and a small tenement and garden in the same parish, of annual rent value of £13.6s.8d. In the ward of Langbourne, charges of fifteenths periodically granted by parliament to the Crown were at the rate of £20.10s, which was a great burden to the poor, and this bequest was to defray that sum for any future such charges to Langbourn ward rising after Sir Martin's death. For receiving these rents the two Company renters were to be given 3s.4d yearly, and any surplus was to be divided between the poor of the Goldsmiths and the maintenance of the Company Hall. By a codicil dated 10 October 1562, in respect of Bowes's feoffment to him of the same day, two further messuages or tenements in St Botolph-without-Bishopsgate were added to the same uses. Roger Mundie's will was proved on 6 November 1562.

=== The Bowes almshouses, Woolwich ===
On 28 September 1560 Bowes made a deed of feoffment to 24 trustees granting them his five messuages with gardens in Woolwich for the occupation of five poor parishioners of Woolwich aged over 50, for term of their lives without charge, or (in default) to five poor members of the Goldsmiths' Company. The houses were to be placed under the management of the Goldsmiths' Company, and in Bowes's will of 1562, giving lands and tenements to the company for various charitable uses, he specified that each of the occupants should receive an annual pension of £1.10s.05d, and that on the occasion of the annual inspection by the company a sermon should be preached at Woolwich parish church. His feoffment of the almshouses to the company was made on 20 September 1565. The houses (which no longer exist) were always occupied by widowed almswomen.

Bowes gave £600 for charitable uses to the mayor and commonalty of York, appointing a St Martin's Day sermon at St Cuthbert's church. On that day it became a custom for the lord mayor and aldermen to go in procession to hear the sermon, and afterwards for each of them to go to the altar and lay down a penny, and so to take up twelvepence to give to the poor.

== Death and burial ==
=== Wills ===
Bowes made a will in September 1562 which carries a codicil dated 29 July 1565, and was enrolled in the Court of Husting in 1595. The will contains various bequests of his properties and estates to his children and grandchildren.

Bowes made his will in its final form in August 1565. If Catholic sensibilities are perhaps expressed in his reference to "the holy and blessed company of heaven" in the opening formula, his request that the twenty parish clerks conveying his body to burial should wear the surplice was in accordance with the existing conformity. Conversely, he left instructions for an extensive series of hour-long sermons, exhorting people to new life through repentance for sin, to be preached by three radical proto-Puritan (and anti-vestiarian) clergymen: he named particularly Robert Crowley (vicar of St Giles Cripplegate), John Gough (rector of St Peter, Cornhill), and John Philpot (of St Peter le Poer), all of whom regularly spoke from the pulpit of St Antholins. These requirements (no doubt intentionally) bridged the divide which opened in the Vestments controversy of 1563–1570.

Bowes appointed his elder sons Thomas and Martin the executors, and Sir William Cordell and Justice Southcott the supervisors, of his will. To Martin he left his leasehold mansion, with remainder to Thomas, together with his lease at Moorfield and his household stuff at North Cray, Woolwich and Mile End. (Thomas had already squandered more than four times the value of his portion of goods.) Dame Elizabeth received one third of his goods, and his youngest children William and Charity, for whom he appointed guardians under the auspices of the mayor and aldermen, had another third. It was in respect of these arrangements that he had presented the pendant for the mayoral chain.

He left money to the Goldsmiths for a funeral feast, and for another funeral feast at his house for the mayor, aldermen and parishioners. He made charitable gifts to poor prisoners, 24 gowns to poor men, to poor maidens' marriages, to the poor of Woolwich and Plumstead, and for the mending of roads. As tokens, he gave to Sir Percival Hart, to his son Henry Hart and his wife (Bowes's daughter) Cecily, a golden ring with a death's head between bent "Bowes": Charity and Thomas Bowes received gilt cups shaped like acorns, and William received a double cup, all gilt, "of a mulberry fashion", called a "brid cupe".

=== Sepulture ===
It was then on 4 August 1566 that Sir Martin died, and on 19 August he was buried, as the St Mary Woolnoth church register records earthily, "...in the vault in the highe quere, and the mouthe of the vault is a foote within the ende of the Marble stone or tombe straighte downe closed up with bricke, and the bricke to be broken down with a pickaxe before you can see the coffyn."

Anthony Munday's 1633 edition of Stow's Survey of London records the more outward arrangements of Bowes's tomb, which has long since disappeared: 'A goodly Marble close tombe under the Communion Table: "Here lyeth buried the body of Sir Martin Bowes, Knight, Alderman and Lord Maior of London, and also free of the Goldsmiths Company: with Cicilie, Dame Anne and Dame Elizabeth, his wives. The which Sir Martin Bowes deceased the 4. day of August, An. Dom. 1566".' Munday added that "His will also is there kept in a faire table", meaning that extracts from his will relating to his charitable benefactions to the parish were displayed on painted panels near the tomb.

John Strype recorded that Bowes's "streamers and cognizances" were still visible in St Mary Woolnoth in his time, and were to be renewed from time to time by the Goldsmiths. In 1828 Thomas Allen observed that three pennons were suspended from the walls, which had been renewed by the Goldsmiths "about twenty years ago". He added that "in the north gallery is the helmet, crest, sword, gloves, spurs and surtout of Sir Martin Bowes, lord mayor 1545."

The reference to his wife Dame Elizabeth, or indeed the entire epitaph, may have been composed later than 1566, for Elizabeth was still very much alive, and remarried (at St Mary Woolnoth on 5 February 1566/67) to the Master of Requests, Thomas Seckford, Esquire, of Woodbridge, Suffolk. She lived until 1586, when, on 8 October, Sir Martin Bowes's vault was re-opened to receive her body. Thomas Seckford died in the following year and his body rested at Clerkenwell before being conveyed to Woodbridge for burial. He devoted his last year to the foundation of almshouses there.

=== Heraldry ===
Edward Hasted gave the following blazon for Sir Martin Bowes:

- Ermine, three bowes in fess erect gules, on a chief azure a swan argent billed and membered gules having in its bill an annulet or, between two leopards faces of the last.

The east window of North Cray church displayed the Bowes arms with the date 1565. Also a monument of 1657 at North Cray to Elizabeth Buggin (née Bowes), daughter of William Bowes (Sir Martin's youngest son), includes heraldry representing Sir Martin Bowes and Dame Elizabeth his third wife. Among the six quarterings in the arms shown above the monument are:

- (2: Bowes): Ermine, three long bows bent gules, cords sable, paleways in fess, on a chief azure, a swan argent, membered and beaked of the second, in the beak a gem ring or, stone of the fourth, between two leopards' faces or, langued gules.
- (3: Harlowse): Per saltire or and azure, two doves in pale, and as many cinquefoils in fess, counterchanged.

Thomas Allen in 1828 described the pennons in St Mary Woolnoth emblazoned as follows:

- Ermine three bows in pale gu. on a chief az. a swan arg. in her beak a dish and cup between two leopards faces, or. Crest: demi-lion rampant gu. spotted, or. holding in his paws a sheaf of arrows, ar.

=== Portraits ===
A portrait is said to have been painted by William Faithorne (1616–1691), and presented by him to the Goldsmiths' Company.

The portrait of Sir Martin Bowes long in the keeping of the Goldsmiths' Company appears to be an "official" image of the benefactor concocted posthumously. It shows him at three-quarter length, in civic robes over a vest of purple silk, wearing the mayoral collar first worn at Bowes's election by his predecessor as Mayor, Sir William Laxton in 1545. (This chain still exists and is worn by the Lords Mayors.) Attached to it (in the portrait) is a pendant jewel said to have been given by Sir Martin in 1558, but which was replaced with another pendant in 1607, after which Bowes's pendant was lost sight of. In his will, however, the pendant given for the mayoral chain is described as "a goodly cross of gold sett with perell and stone".

On the table near his right hand (in which he holds his gloves) is a standing cup possibly intended to represent the Bowes Cup, but not very like it. In the upper corner is an inscription "Effigies Martini Bowes Equitis Aurati Aetat[is] Suae 66, Ob[i]t Anno D[omi]ni 1566." The Latin word "Effigies" (i.e. effigy) indicates that this is a constructive representation of the subject with his attributes as benefactor, a patron image. The inscription, which states the year of his death, is posthumous, though the statement that the likeness was made when Bowes was 66 (about 1564) might suggest it was based on an earlier (lifetime) original.

The Broke Hall portrait

The primary image is the portrait of head and shoulders only (wearing a furred robe with a simple chain, and a very minimal ruff at the collar), which is inscribed "Sr: Mart: Bowes, Knight. A:D:1562, AETS:64". This painting in oil on panel, of English school, was held by family descent into the Broke family at Broke Hall, Nacton, near Ipswich, where it was recorded by the antiquary Edmund Farrer in his survey of portraits in East Suffolk houses. It was illustrated in the Goldsmiths' Review in 1975. It was sold at Sotheby's in 2005. If this lively and spirited image was the exemplar for the features of the Goldsmiths' painting, as might be the case, something was lost in the transmission.

== Family ==
Martin Bowes made three marriages:

- first, by 1526, Cecily Eliott. They had at least two sons.
- secondly, by 1538, Anne (died 1553), the daughter of John Barrett of Belhus in Aveley, Essex.
- thirdly, in 1554, Elizabeth (died 1586), the daughter of Thomas Harlow and widow of William Billingsley.

In February 1556/57 Bowes stated that he had fathered eighteen children, of whom five sons and two daughters were then surviving. The living children were Thomas, Martin and William, Cecily and Charity: Joan had already died, and two other sons pass unmentioned in Sir Martin's will.

There were at least two sons by the first marriage, including Thomas and Martyn, who were admitted to the Goldsmiths' Company in 1542.

- Thomas Bowes (died 1591), eldest son and heir, married (1) (on 1 September 1544 at St Mary Woolnoth), Thomasin Wilkinson. During the 1540s he worked at the Mint with his father. He married (2) (in 1555) Cecily, the widow of Thomas Haynes (overseas factor of Sir William Bowyer (Lord Mayor 1543), and Merchant Adventurer). According to his father's will, Thomas Bowes was a spendthrift.
- Martin Bowes (died 1573), married (1) (on 1 September 1544 at St Mary Woolnoth), Frances Scrope, granddaughter of Robert Amadas, who brought him the manors of Jenkins and Malmaynes at Barking. She was buried on 29 December 1556. Some of their children were baptized at St Mary Woolnoth during the 1540s. He married (2) Frances (died 1619), daughter of Richard Clopton (of Kentwell, Long Melford) by his second wife Margery Playters (of Sotterley). Frances had a half-sister, Mary, who was the wife of Sir William Cordell, a supervisor of Sir Martin's will. After Martin Bowes's death his widow remarried to Matthew Hutton, Archbishop of York, as his third wife.
- Cecily Bowes married Henry Hart (died c. 1578), son of Sir Percival Hart (c. 1496–1580) (Chief Server and Knight Harbinger to four monarchs) of Lullingstone Castle, Kent. After Hart's death she married (2) (as his second wife) Richard Covert (died 1579/80) of Slaugham, West Sussex.

The following, christened at St Mary Woolnoth, were certainly children of Dame Anne Bowes:

- Joan Bowes (baptized 22 July 1541). A daughter of this name married George Heton, citizen and Merchant Taylor, and Chamberlain of London 1563–1577. By him she was mother of Thomas Heaton, MP, and of Martin Heton (c. 1554–1609, afterwards Bishop of Ely), in giving birth to whom she died.
- Francis Bowes (baptized 3 November 1542 – presumed dead by 1545)
- William Bowes (baptized 10 March 1543/44)
- Francis Bowes (baptized 1 July 1545) (one of these names buried 1 July 1545)
- Charity Bowes (baptized 25 December 1548). She married John Covert, MP, of Ewhurst, East Sussex (died 1589), third son of Richard Covert of Slaugham. Charity died in 1583 and was buried at Ifield, West Sussex.
- Henry Bowes (baptized 1 May 1550). Not mentioned in his father's will, 1565.

There was at least one son by the third marriage:

- William Bowes (baptized 8 December 1556, and therefore born about two months before Bowes mentioned his 18 children), of St. John Street, Clerkenwell, is named in the (1587) will of his mother's third husband, Thomas Seckford of Woodbridge, Suffolk. He inherited the manor and advowson of North Cray. He married (1) (December 1577, at St James's, Clerkenwell) Mary, daughter of Robert Harrys (died 1588), M.P. and Master in Chancery, (also of St. John Street). He married (2), ------. He died in 1633.
