= Francis Aungier =

Francis Aungier may refer to:

- Francis Aungier, 1st Baron Aungier of Longford (1558–1632), Anglo-Irish judge
- Francis Aungier, 1st Earl of Longford (c. 1632–1700), Anglo-Irish politician

== See also ==
- Aungier (surname)
