= George Barne (died 1558) =

English businessman

Sir George Barne
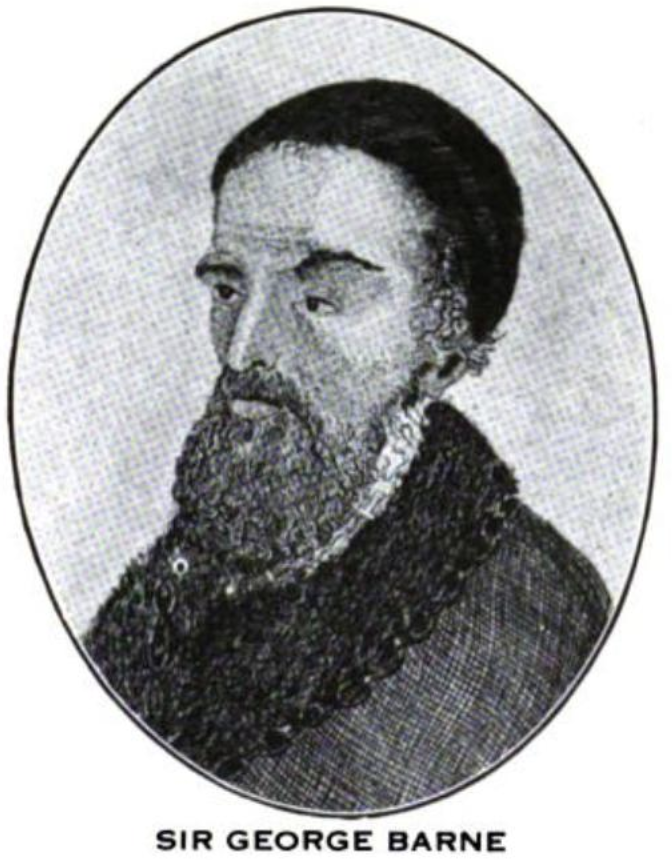

Lord Mayor of London
- In office 1552–1553
- Preceded by: Richard Dobbes
- Succeeded by: Thomas Whyte

Sheriff of London
- In office 1545–1546

Personal details
- Born: about 1500
- Died: 18 February 1558
- Occupation: merchant

Sir George Barne (died 1558) (also called Barons or Barnes) was an English businessman in the City of London who was active in developing new trading links with Russia, West Africa and North America, far outside what had been traditional English trading patterns. Created a knight in 1553, he served as Sheriff of London and Lord Mayor of London. He was the father of Sir George Barne (died 1593) and grandfather of Sir William Barne. Nicholas Culverwell was probably a nephew.

== Origins and early life ==
His father was George Barne, whose family had links with Wells, Somerset, a citizen and Haberdasher of the City of London.

Barne was admitted to the freedom of the Worshipful Company of Haberdashers. He married Alice Brooke of Shropshire, the sister of Roger Brooke. She had previously been married to Richard Relff, citizen and Vintner of London, who died in 1528 and was buried at All Hallows Honey Lane. Relff's will affords various details of his circumstances: his wife Alice was his executrix. Barne's eldest son, George, was born around 1532. Between 1536 and 1548 Barne acquired leases and tenements around All Hallows Honey Lane. Barne followed his father in his conventional trading business, such as exporting cloth and importing wine to and from Spain. In 1538/39, in the Admiralty Court, Anthony Hussey gave a sentence against George Barnes (citizen and Haberdasher of London) and his factor Philip Barnes (defendants), on a bond in the sum of £25 lent by Roger Hurst of London for the purchase of wines at St Lucar in Spain. Barne progressed his career within the Company of Haberdashers, whose Master Stephen Pecocke had been Lord Mayor in 1532-33 and, dying in 1536, had left legacies to be administered by the Company's Masters and Wardens.

=== The Shrieval year, 1545-1546 ===
Barne had prospered and risen sufficiently in civic life by 1542 that he was in December of that year installed as alderman for the ward of Portsoken. Less than three years later he was selected, and at Michaelmas 1545 was installed, as Sheriff of London together with Ralph Aleyn (three times Master of the Worshipful Company of Grocers), to coincide with the mayoralty of Sir Martin Bowes (citizen and Goldsmith) for the term 1545-1546. This was the last full term before the death of King Henry VIII in January 1546/47.

The year was marked by the celebrations for the Treaty of Ardres and the great Midsummer Watch conducted through London by the Lord Mayor; there were also various executions for heresy and treason which it was the Sheriffs' duty to see performed, not least the burning of the Protestant martyr Anne Askew. Ralph Aleyn died in January 1547, and after this "George Barons, alderman of London and Master of the Haberdashers", with Richard Aleyn and the other wardens of the Company, were defendants in Chancery against Anne and Thomas, executors of Ralph Ale[y]n, alderman, in a case concerning the legacies of Stephen Pecocke. In 1546 he exchanged the aldermanry of Portsoken ward for that of Coleman Street, which he retained until 1558.

=== Edwardian opportunities ===
Through the middle years of the reign of King Edward VI, Barne became an important figure in promoting expeditions for the expansion of English overseas trade. The failing influence of the Hanseatic League freed English trade to take independent steps of its own. English contacts with the North American coast and Newfoundland had arisen in 1497 and 1498 with John Cabot's voyages out of Bristol under the commission of Henry VII. His son, the explorer Sebastian Cabot, among his many and varied endeavours sought to discover the Northwest Passage, and dreamed of finding sea-routes to Cathay.

In 1550-1551 Cabot assisted King Edward in the settlement of certain disputes between the English and German merchants, and was granted £200 for his trouble. In December 1551 he, with Sir Hugh Willoughby and Richard Chancellor, and "with certain grave citizens of London", formed a "Company of Merchant Adventurers for the Discovery of Regions, Dominions, Islands, and Places unknown" (later called the "Company of Merchant Adventurers to New Lands", or the "Muscovy Company"), to which King Edward intended to grant a Charter of Incorporation, but died before it could be sealed. George Barne and William Garrard are commonly held to have been among the principal movers in promoting the company's first expedition, in 1553.

This led on the one hand to Willoughby's discovery of Novaya Zemlya, but the loss of himself and his crews in search of the Northeast Passage to China, but on the other hand to Richard Chancellor's successful journey from the mouth of the Northern Dvina to Moscow and his negotiations there with Tsar Ivan IV.

== The Mayoral year, 1552-1553 ==
As was customary, the election of the new Mayor occurred on Michaelmas day (29 September 1552) and a sermon was made in the Guildhall Chapel, the use of Communion for that occasion having been discontinued. On 17 October (St Luke's Eve) the Mayor and aldermen with Sir Robert Broke (Recorder of London) rode from the Lord Mayor's house through Friday Street, Cheapside and Newgate all in their scarlet gowns, up to the Serjeants' feast at Gray's Inn. There were four tables: at the first, the Lord Chancellor and other lords; the Lord Mayor, aldermen and sheriffs at the second, about twenty; the judges and the old serjeants sat at the third, and the new serjeants at the fourth. There were 10 dishes to the first, and eight to the last course, followed by wafers and hippocras.

Barne's mayoralty spanned a most dramatic course of events: he was the Lord Mayor who held his nerve and protected the City through it all. The sheriffs in his term were John Maynard and William Garrard. Maynard, a Mercer, was chosen after three previously selected persons, beginning with the citizen and Master Clothworker John Crymes, had refused the office and paid fines of £200 each to avoid it. Maynard had been living in Venice and had many contracts due to be paid to him whenever he should become Sheriff: so he did not lose by it. He assisted the midwinter and Easter festivities. It was an age of civic pageants and revels, in which the operations of the powers of the state were mimicked.

=== The Lords of Misrule ===
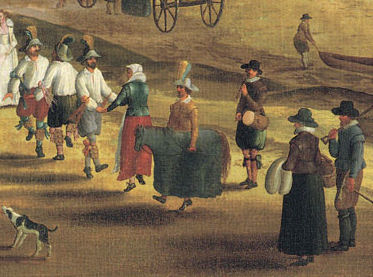
A hobby horse with morris dancers at Richmond, London (painting, c. 1620)

King Edward spent Christmas at Westminster, and had George Ferrers as his Lord of Misrule. On 4 January 1553 Barne attended an alderman's funeral before noon. On the same day the King's Lord of Misrule came to Tower Wharf with his company and met with the Sheriff's Lord of Misrule with all of his, and all attired in velvet suits and embroidered costumes with ribbons and spangles with horse riders, fools and hangmen and prisoners, and morris men dancing as they went, they processed in a pageant through Gracechurch Street and the Cornhill, making proclamations with their heralds.

At a prepared scaffold the King's lord knighted the Sheriff's lord, giving him a rich gown and dubbing him thrice on the shoulder with his sword. They drank to one another, and the cofferer cast gold and silver around as they went on through Cheap, the two lords of misrule turning up Wood Street to dine with the Mayor, and thence to the Sheriff's house, to the Old Jewry and the Treasurer's house at London Wall, stopping for drinking and banqueting. So by the evening they came through Bishopsgate, Leadenhall, Fenchurch Street and Mark Lane: the Sheriff's lord accompanied the King's lord by torchlight down to Tower Wharf, where the King's lord went into his pinnace with a great shot of guns, and the Sheriff's lord took his leave of him.

=== Civil welfare ===
On 21 November 1552 the poor children of the City were taken into Christ's Hospital (formerly the Greyfriars), and other sick and poor people were taken into St Thomas' Hospital in Southwark, where they were to have lodgings, food, drink and clothes from the City's alms. On Christmas Day, when the Lord Mayor and aldermen rode to St Paul's, the street through Cheap was lined with the children (some 350 of them) and their keepers, the masters of the Hospitals, all in their liveries. Barne promptly set about reforming trading standards: he sat in judgement on one Fowlkes who had cheated his customers, and had him set in the pillory in Cheap with his ear hard nailed to it. He set others in the pillory for selling by false measures, he punished bawds and whores by having them driven around in carts, and he had the vagabonds whipped out of the city, "so that all malefactors feared him for his good executinge of justice." He is regarded by some as having been a stern moralist. Mary, the king's sister, came to London in February, and in March 1553 the Parliament sat.

=== The Lenten play ===
On 17 March 1553 John Maynard rode in through Aldgate with a standard and drums, followed in procession by giants and hobby horses, with great men and horses with coats of velvet and gold chains on their necks: then followed the morris dancers, and many minstrels, and he who had lately been lord of misrule rode in, arrayed gorgeously with chains of gold about his neck and many valuable rings in his hands. The serjeants followed in coats of velvet with chains of gold. These were followed in by a Devil and a Sultan, after whom there came in a priest, shriving the Jack o' Lent on horseback, followed by the Jack's physicians. There was a short pageant-play, for Jack o' Lent's wife brought his physicians to him, offering to pay them a thousand pounds if they would save Jack's life. A carriage came in draped with cloth of gold, with banners, and minstrels playing and singing.

=== Willoughby sets forth ===
Barne was knighted by the King at Westminster on 11 April 1553. Henry Machyn tells that on that day the king went from Westminster to Greenwich by water, passing the Tower, all the ships firing off salutes of guns as he passed. At Ratcliff "the iij shypes that was rygyng [there, to go] to the New-fouland, and the ij pennons [pinnaces] shott guns and chambers a grett nombur." At this time the Edward Bonaventure, the Bona Esperanza and the Bona Confidentia were being prepared for their Expedition in search of the Northern Sea Route to Far Cathay, or at least to northern Muscovy, under the command of Sir Hugh Willoughby and Stephen Borough, with the navigator Richard Chancellor. It was the start of the great project, the dream of Sebastian Cabot, to whom a consortium of distinguished persons (led by the Duke of Northumberland) and many merchants brought their personal investment and sponsorship.

Hugh Willoughby was not only a highly experienced naval commander, he was moreover closely related to that side of the royal lineage traced through the descendants of Mary Tudor, which in the spring of 1553 was favoured as the most likely to produce a Protestant succession. Having the particular support (as it is said) of George Barnes and William Garrard, the society of adventurers promoting this voyage was now to receive a Charter from King Edward to incorporate them as a Company of Merchant Adventurers to New Lands, "for the discoverie by sea, of Iles, lands, territories, dominions and Seigniories vnknowen, and by the Subiects of the sayd late king not commonly by seas frequented" (so it is related in Elizabeth's charter of 1566), but that the said king "died before the finishing and sealing of his most ample and gracious letters of priuiledges promised to the sayd Subiects".

But in this expectation, and under this authority, the three vessels weighed anchor at Deptford on 10 May 1553. It is likely that the governance of this Company (known commonly as the Muscovy Company), which in Philip and Mary's Charter to them of February 1554/55 was granted to Sebastian Cabot as Governor, with four Consuls, Sir George Barne, William Garrard, Anthony Hussey and John Southcote, and twenty-four named Assistants, reflected the intention of the Edwardian Charter.

=== Church vessels, and the Bridewell grant ===
Soon after receiving his knighthood, Sir George sat in the Guildhall with Nicholas Ridley, Bishop of London and the Chief Justice Sir Roger Cholmeley, as Commissioners, to receive certificates from all the churchwardens listing the remaining money, plate, jewels and other metals in their churches, which, together with all copes and vestments of cloth of gold, were now to be surrendered to the King, reserving only a chalice and paten, the bells, and a small number of necessaries for each church. The Mayor attended only one sermon at St Paul's at Whitsuntide, given by Bishop Ridley on 21 May, and on 25 May the Commissioners suppressed the plate of St Paul's itself. Evidently this was to be done urgently because the King's health (and with it the Protestant succession) now threatened to fail.

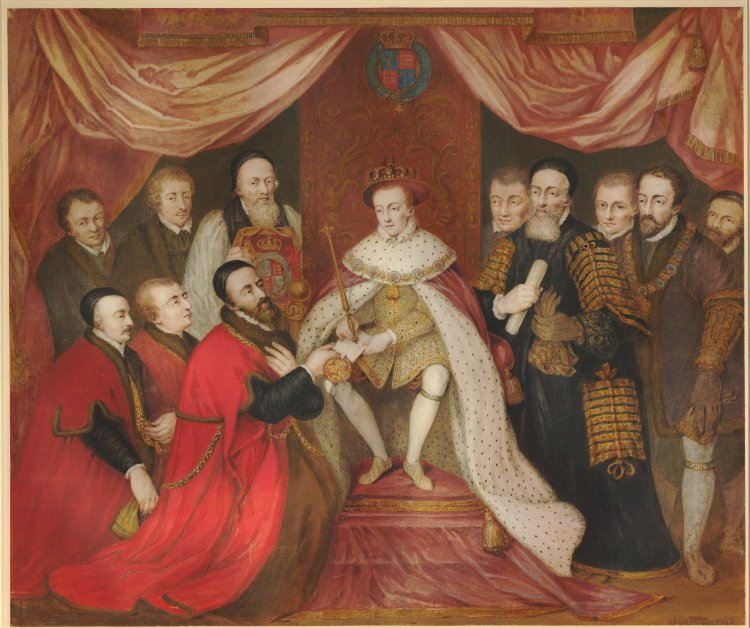
Edward VI granting the Bridewell Charter to Sir George Barnes in June 1553 (Coloured print by George Vertue, 1750)

In April 1553 Edward granted his Charter for the Bridewell Palace, presenting it to the City Corporation as a Hospital for poor children and a House of Correction for wanton women. Bishop Ridley (who had himself played a central role in obtaining this), shortly before he was burned at the stake in October 1555, wrote:

"And thou, O Sir George Barnes, thou wast in thy year not only a furtherer and continuer of that which before thee by thy predecessor [sc. Sir Richard Dobbs] was well begun, but also thou didst labour so to have perfected the work that it should have been an absolute thing and a perfect spectacle of true Charity and Godliness unto all Christendom. Thine endeavour was to have set up an house of occupation, both that all kind of poverty, being able to work, should not have lacked profitably whereupon they might have been occupied, to their own relief and to the property and commodity of the commonwealth of the City, and also to have retired thither the poor babes brought up in the Hospitals, when they had come to a certain age and strength, and also all those which in these hospitals aforesaid have been cured of their diseases. And to have brought this to pass thou obtainedst, not without great diligence and labour, both of thee and thy brethren, of the godly King Edward, that Christian and peerless prince, that princely palace of Bridewell, and what other things to the performance of the same, and under what conditions, it is not unknown."

A print representing this grant was made by George Vertue around 1750. It shows Sir George Barnes as Mayor, with two aldermen, receiving the Charter on behalf of the City. It was drawn after a large painted original at the Bridewell, formerly thought to be by Hans Holbein the Younger, but no longer credited as such.

=== Queen Jane ===
The young king died on 6 July 1553, and on 8 July the Lord Mayor was summoned by letter to the Council, ordering him to bring six or eight aldermen, six Merchant Staplers and six Merchant Adventurers. The Duke of Northumberland disclosed the news secretly to them, and required them to countersign the Letters Patent for the Limitation of the Crown of England and Ireland, the purpose of which was to exclude the Catholic, Mary, and his sister Elizabeth from the throne and to nominate Lady Jane Grey as the legitimate successor. Edward did prepare a brief declaration to that effect, from which this lengthy document was evolved under the date of 21 June 1553. The head officers and guard were sworn to Jane on 9 July. Jane's claim was laid for her as the granddaughter of Mary, sister of Henry VIII. Jane, who was brought from Greenwich to the Tower and was received there as queen on 10 July 1553, was proclaimed at four usual places in London by William Garrard the sheriff with two heralds and their trumpeters. The next day a man had both his ears cut off for saying that Mary had the better claim.

As many rallied to Mary in East Anglia and proclaimed her the rightful successor, the Duke of Northumberland went off to forestall her approach to London, taking many of the lords and knights with him and many of the men of arms. The Tower was stocked with armaments, and a close watch was kept on the City gates. The distinguished old alderman and twice former Mayor, Sir Ralph Warren, died in Bethnal Green on 11 July. He had been instrumental in the acquisition of the Hospital of St Thomas of Acre for the Mercers' Hall. A full civic heraldic funeral became necessary. On 16 July at Paul's Cross, Bishop Ridley gave his sermon on the death of King Edward, and declared that neither Lady Mary nor Lady Elizabeth were lawfully begotten heirs of their father.

Sir Ralph's funeral occurred on 17 July: in his procession to St Benet Sherehog were borne five pennons of arms and a standard, his coat armour, helmet, mantle and crest with twelve dozen escutcheons. Sir George Barne was the senior mourner, followed by his sword-bearer, the four Esquire mourners, many aldermen, and a long procession of others including fifty poor men to whom Warren had left gowns of rat's colour. The Lord Mayor and aldermen dined at the funeral feast, which was a considerable one. John Machell, citizen and Master Clothworker, was sworn alderman in place of Warren on 20 July.

Mary's succession soon became inevitable, and Northumberland's expedition failed at Cambridge and Bury St Edmunds. It was therefore necessary for the City to perform a rapid about-turn when Mary arrived in London, and the speed with which that was done probably saved the City from a more difficult outcome.

=== Proclamation of Queen Mary ===
Charles Wriothesley, in his Chronicle, relates that on 19 July 1553 Barne had a secret meeting with the Earl of Shrewsbury and Sir John Mason (Clerk to the Council) at Paul's Wharf, who summoned him to meet privately with the Council an hour later at the Earl of Pembroke's place at Baynard's Castle, with his sheriffs and whichever of the aldermen he thought best. The Lord Mayor accordingly summoned his sheriffs and aldermen, and Mr Recorder, at St Paul's, and went with them to the Council. They informed him that they must ride with the Council to Cheapside to proclaim Queen Mary. As they came to the Cross in Cheap the Garter King at Arms (Sir Gilbert Dethick), in his coat of arms, was announced by his trumpeter and made the proclamation before a joyous crowd.

The mayor and the Council then went straight into the choir at St Paul's and sang the Te Deum (with all the organs playing). Then the Council sent the Herald and his trumpeter, and William Garrard the Sheriff, to make the proclamation in all the usual places in the city. The bells were rung continuously in every parish church until ten o'clock at night, bonfires were lit in the streets and tables were set out for banqueting: and as the Queen was escorted around the city with 30 horse, wherever she went the people cried out "God save Queen Mary". The following day the Lords of the Council, the Duke of Suffolk, Archbishop Cranmer and Bishop Thomas Goodrich (the Chancellor) all dined at the Lord Mayor's house and continued in conference for several hours. Thus Queen Mary gained the City of London and made her succession decisive.

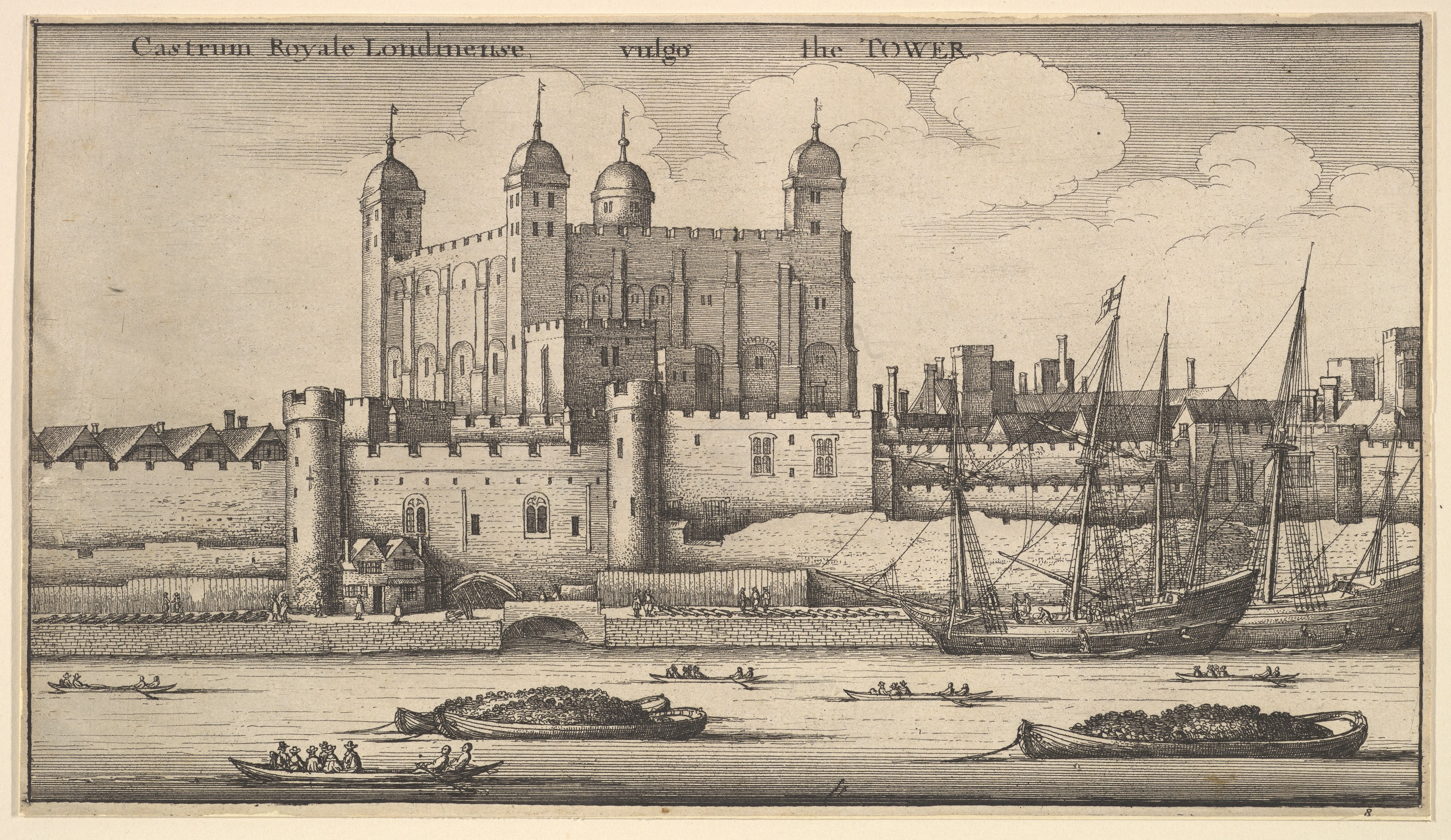
The Tower of London in 1625 (Hollar)

On 23 July 1553 Barne made the selection of Thomas Offley to be a sheriff for the coming year. (Thomas Lodge was chosen by the Commons on 1 August for the other sheriff: but he delayed in Flanders, and the office fell eventually upon William Hewett.) Then followed the arrests of the Duke of Northumberland and his entourage, of the Marquess of Northampton, Bishop Nicholas Ridley, Lord Robert Dudley, Sir Roger Cholmeley, Sir Edward Montagu, the Duke of Suffolk and Sir John Cheke, most of whom were "had to the Tower". On 29 July Sir Martin Bowes and others, with William Garrard the Sheriff, rode to New Hall in Essex to present to Mary a "benevolence" of £500 in gold half sovereigns, on behalf of the Lord Mayor, Aldermen and Commons of the City of London (levied upon all the Companies, assisted by the aldermen). This was graciously accepted by the Queen. Sir John Yorke was imprisoned and his property sequestrated (his house being sealed up with the Mayor's seal).

=== Mary is received ===
Matters being so settled, on 3 August 1553 Queen Mary made her formal entry into the City from Whitechapel, on a palfrey, fully costumed, with more than five hundred lords, knights, ladies and gentlemen in velvet coats, and all the king's trumpeters, heralds and serjeants-at-arms riding with her in procession.

Where barrs were set up at Aldgate, the Lord Mayor and Mr Recorder (Sir Robert Broke) were kneeling, and Mr Recorder, speaking for the Mayor, his brethren and the commons, presented their duty to her Highness, in token whereof they offered to her the Lord Mayor's sceptre of office, welcoming her into her City and Chamber of London. Sir George Barne then kissed the sceptre and delivered it to the queen. Her Highness held it and smilingly said, "My Lord Mayor, I heartily thank you and all your brethren the aldermen of your gentleness showed unto me, which shall not be forgotten, for I have known you ever to have been good toward me," before presenting it back to the Lord Mayor in token of acceptance of his homage.

The streets were gravelled and richly draped with cloths of Arras, and filled with the liverymen of all the Companies: there were four great stages set up for the waites and musicians, as they progressed through Leadenhall, down Gracechurch Street, up Fenchurch Street, down Mark Lane, and so to the Tower of London. All this way the Lord Mayor, bearing his sceptre, rode before the queen with the Garter King of Arms beside him, and the Earl of Arundel behind, bearing the mayoral sword before the queen. An oration was made by the children of Christ's Hospital. The Lord Mayor took his leave as Queen Mary entered the Tower.

=== Scandal at Paul's Cross ===
Following the funeral of King Edward on 8 August, on 13 August a preacher appointed by the Queen declared that Edmund Bonner, Bishop of London, had been imprisoned falsely. This so angered the crowd that, amidst the shouting and commotion, one man threw a dagger at the preacher, which struck part of the pulpit. Lord Courtenay, the Lady Marchioness of Exeter and Bonner himself were positioned near the Lord Mayor and aldermen, who rose up and tried to clear the crowd, which was calling for the preacher's blood. The disturbance was so laid to the Mayor's charge to the Queen, that Mayor and aldermen were summoned to Westminster the next day before the Queen's Counsel, where it was threatened that the Mayor would be deposed and the liberties of the City taken away. They were required to give answer on 16 August whether they would rule the city in peace and good order, or have other rulers set over them.

Barne accordingly had all the Commons of the Livery appear at the Guildhall on 15 August, where Mr Recorder asked them to state whether they would stand by the Lord Mayor, and see these malefactors punished and reformed, or whether they would prefer to have their liberties taken away. The answer was given that, with the good help and means of the Lord Mayor and his brethren, they would be aiding and assisting so that the queen should have no further complaint against them, and that the malefactors should be punished. Accordingly the Lord Mayor and aldermen gave this answer to the Council on 16 August, and it was "well accepted and taken". The Lord Mayor then made a proclamation offering five pounds reward for information as to who threw the dagger.

=== Consequences ===
On 18 August the Duke of Northumberland, the Marquess of Northampton and the Earl of Warwick were arraigned for treason and condemned at Westminster before the (rehabilitated) Duke of Norfolk, and on the next day Sir Andrew Dudley, Sir John Gates (late Captain of the Guard), Henry Gates and Sir Thomas Palmer were arraigned and condemned before Sir William Paulet. On Sunday 20th at Paul's Cross Sir George Barne sat next to Paulet, with the Lord Privy Seal (the Earl of Bedford), Earl of Pembroke, Lord Rich, and Sir Henry Jerningham, who as Captain of the Guard had 200 halberdiers ready to suppress any disturbance. The Lord Mayor and aldermen had all the Companies in their livery standing present to keep order. The next day the Mayor received instruction from the queen to bring 50 of the leading city commoners and Common Council to the Tower of London, to hear the Duke of Northumberland, at a Roman Mass of Holy Communion in the Tower Chapel, confess his long error from the true Catholic faith and his wish that his hearers should avoid such ill doctrines as his. On 22 August Northumberland, Gates and Palmer were beheaded on Tower Hill.

When the Queen had given the Great Seal of England into the hands of Bishop Stephen Gardiner, on 1 September she demanded a prest of £20,000 from the City Companies at a week's notice, to be repaid three weeks after Michaelmas. On 30 September her Highness rode in a carriage with cloth of gold to Westminster, followed by Anne of Cleves and Lady Elizabeth, and on 1 October she was crowned in Westminster Abbey by Bishop Gardiner. On 29 September 1553 (Sir) Thomas White was elected Lord Mayor for the coming year, and so the arraignment and condemnation for High Treason of Archbishop Thomas Cranmer, Guildford Dudley, Lady Jane his wife, Ambrose Dudley and Henry Dudley, Esquiers, fell to White's superintendence at the Guildhall on 13 November 1553. White was knighted in December.

== Russia and Guinea ==
Barne helped to finance the first Guinea voyage in 1553, commanded by Thomas Wyndham. When the Company of Merchant Adventurers for Trade with Unknown Lands received its foundation charter from Queen Mary in February 1554/1555, Barne was named as one of the four Consuls for the Company's governance, together with Anthony Hussey, William Garrard, and John Southcote. He remained a chief proponent of increasing trade with Russia.

== Death and legacy ==
Barne died on 18 February 1557/58 and, in a heraldic civic funeral, was buried on 24 February in the church of St Bartholomew-by-the-Exchange. As he was then the chief merchant of the Muscovy Company, a pennon of the Muscovy arms was borne in the procession. Eighty poor men went clad in black gowns, and the Lord Mayor (Sir Thomas Curteys) and his swordbearer wore black gowns. A standard and five pennons of arms were borne, and a coat of arms, sword, target and helmet. There was a goodly hearse of wax, two great branches of white wax, four dozen torches and eight dozen penselles, and nine dozen escutcheons. The heralds supervising were William Harvey, Clarenceux, and the Lancaster Herald. A sermon was preached by Dr. Chadsey the next day, after which was the funeral feast.

His will was dated 15 February 1557/58, and was proved on 21 March 1557/58. His inquisition post mortem was held at the Guildhall on 1 April 1558. As well as in London, he also owned property in Surrey and Hertfordshire.

Dame Alice Barne survived her husband and wrote her will on 20 September 1558, and it was proved on 5 July 1559. She was buried beside her husband at St Bartholomew-the-Less, and she, also, received a civic funeral, on 2 June 1559. The funeral was directed by Mr Clarenceux, and twenty singing clerks (all singing in English) preceded her body to the church. The house, the streets for the procession, and the church were all draped in black cloth with escutcheons of arms. Sir William Garrard was the chief mourner, with Master James Altham and Master (Richard?) Chamberlyn, and her sons and daughters. After a sermon at the church, the clerks sang the Te Deum laudamus in English, and there was singing as the body was lowered into the grave.

=== Heraldry ===
Sir George Barne the elder's arms were formerly "Argent, on a chevron wavy azure between three barnacles proper, three trefoils slipped of the first." But, according to J.G. Nichols quoting a source dated 1605, those arms were taken down after his death by his son and these set up instead, "Azure, three leopards' heads, argent."

The Barne arms are shown in the 1568 Visitation of London as, Quarterly:

- (1 and 4, for Barne): Azure, three leopards' heads argent.
- (2 and 3): Argent a chevron azure between three Cornish choughs sable.

Crest: On a mound vert an eagle rising argent, beaked and ducally gorged or.

=== Posterity ===
Their son George continued many of his father's trading ventures, though some have questioned how far the father or the son should be credited with commercial innovations. Barne's descendants became associated with Sotterley Hall, Suffolk, which was sold to Miles Barne in 1744.

== Family ==
He married Alice Brooke from Shropshire, who died in 1559. Of their children:

- Sir George Barne (died 1593) married Anne Garrard, daughter of Sir William Garrard.
- John Barne (living 1591) of Willesden married Jane Langton, daughter of Thomas Langton and stepdaughter of Sir Andrew Judd.
- Elizabeth Barne married Sir John Rivers, Lord Mayor of London in 1574.
- Anne Barne married first Alexander Carleill, becoming the mother of Christopher Carleill; and secondly, in 1562, she married Sir Francis Walsingham.
