= Aungier =

Aungier is a surname. Notable people with the surname include:

- Gerald Aungier (1640–1677), English colonial governor
- Francis Aungier, 1st Baron Aungier of Longford (1558–1632), Anglo-Irish judge
- Francis Aungier, 1st Earl of Longford (c. 1632–1700), Anglo-Irish politician

== See also ==
- Aunger
