= John Phillips (fl. 1570–1591) =

English writer and poet

John Phillips (fl. 1570–1591) was an English writer and poet.

He was educated at Queens' College, Cambridge but took no degree. He was a student of the classics, but in one place he describes himself as "student in divinitie" and in another as "preacher of the Word of God". He inclined to puritanism, and was patronised by noble ladies of known puritan proclivities. It is doubtful if he were a beneficed clergyman.

To A Sermon of Calvin … upon Heb. xiii. 13 (London, 1581), Phillips appended An Answere to the Slanders of the Papistes against Christe's Syllie Flock … quod J. P., and to George Gascoigne's Dromme of Doomes Daye, he added A Private Letter the which doth teach Remedies against the bitternesse of Death, by I. P. to his familiar Friend, G. P..

On the Stationers' Registers appear entries of two books by Phillips, not otherwise known: Precious Pearles of perfecte Godlines to be used of every faythfull Xpian, begonne by the Lady Fraunces Aburgavenny, and finished by John Phillip (7 December 1577) (Lady Abergavenny was first wife of Henry Neville, lord of Abergavenny, and daughter of Thomas Manners, 1st Earl of Rutland); and The Rudimentes of Reason gathered out of the Preceptes of the worthie and learned Philosopher Periander, by John Philips, Student in Divinitie (26 April 1578). Abraham Fleming, in his Bright Burning Beacon (1580), mentions "John Philippes" among those who wrote on the earthquake of 6 April 1580, but no book by Phillips on this topic is accessible.

Phillips was equally energetic as a writer of elegiac verse, and he is responsible for the four epitaphs, published in single folio sheets, all extant in unique exemplars, which respectively celebrated the wife (d. 7 July 1570) of Alexander Avenet, lord mayor of London (London, by Richard Johnes), in the Huth Library; Alderman Sir William Garrat (d. 27 September 1571), London (by Richard Johnes), at Britwell; Margaret Douglas, countess of Lennox (d. 9 March 1577–8), London (for Edward White), at Britwell; Henry Wriothesley, 2nd Earl of Southampton (d. 4 October 1571), in the Huth Library.

== Works ==
- A Friendly Larum or Faythfull Warnynge to the True-harted Subiectes of England. Discoueryng the Actes and Malicious Myndes of those obstinate Papists that hope (as they term it) to haue theyr Golden Day [1570] n.d.
- A Balad intituled “A cold Pye for the Papistes.” n.d.
- A Fruitfull Exhortation given to all Godly and Faithfull Christians n.d.; dedicated to Lettice, countess of Leicester.
- A rare and strange Historicall Nouell of Cleomenes and Sophonisba surnamed Juliet. Very pleasant to reade (1577), dedicated to George Fiennes, lord Dacre.
- A Commemoration of Margaret Douglas, Countess of Lennox (1578).
- The Wonderfull Worke of God shewed upon a Chylde, whose Name is William Withers, being in the Towne of Walsam … Suffolk, who, being Eleuen Yeeres of Age, laye in a Traunce the Space of Tenne Days … and hath continued the Space of Three Weeks (1581), dedicated to Edward Denny.
- The Life and Death of Sir Phillip Sidney, late Lord Gouernour of Flushing. His Funerals solemnized in Paules Churche, where he lyeth interred; with the whole Order of the Mournfull Shewe as they marched throwe the Citie of London on Thursday, the 16 of February 1587, dedicated to the Earl of Essex.
- The Perfect Path to Paradice, containing divers most ghostly Prayers and Meditations for the Comfort of Afflicted Consciences … also a Summons to Repentance (1590), dedicated to the Earl of Essex.
- A Commemoration of the Life and Death of Sir Christopher Hatton, knight, Lord Chancellor of England (1591).
