= Henry Hart (died c. 1578) =

English politician

Henry Hart (1531 – c. 1578) of Lullingstone, Kent was an English member of parliament.

He was the eldest son of Sir Percival Hart of Lullingstone Castle and his wife Frideswide, the daughter of Edmund Braye, 1st Baron Braye and was educated at King's College, Cambridge

He was a member (MP) of the parliament of England for Old Sarum in 1559.

He died before his father c.1578. He had married Cecily, the daughter of Sir Martin Bowes, but had no children. The family seat of Lullington Castle therefore passed on his father's death to his younger brother George.
