= Richard Onslow (Solicitor General) =

English politician and lawyer (1528–1571)

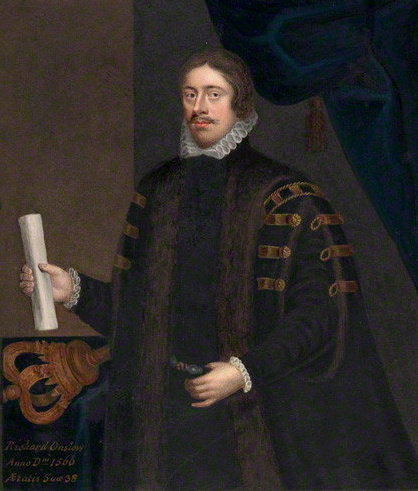
Possibly fictitious portrait of Richard Onslow

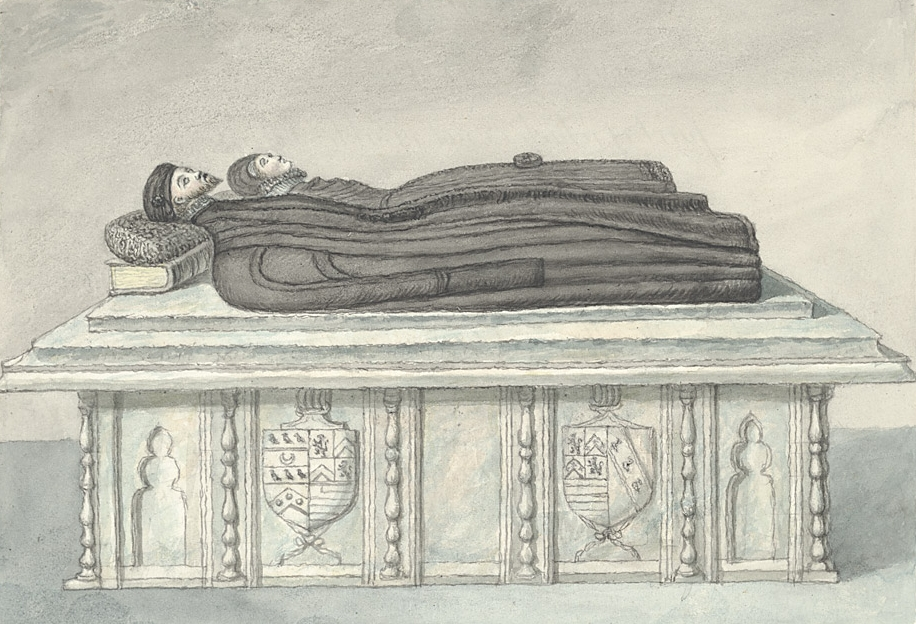
Monument of Richard Onslow in old St. Chad's Church, Shrewsbury, drawn 1796

Richard Onslow (1528 – 2 April 1571) was a 16th-century English lawyer and politician who served as Solicitor General from 1566 to 1569 and Speaker of the House of Commons of England. (He was the first of two Richard Onslows and three Onslows to be elected Speaker.) He was born in Shrewsbury, a younger son of Roger Onslow and his first wife Margaret Poyner.

Onslow entered the Inner Temple in 1545, from which he was briefly expelled in 1556 with several other members for involvement in an affray but was readmitted after an apology and a spell in the Fleet Prison and was a Bencher (giving power to call graduates to the bar) in 1559, and Governor from 1564 to 1566. He was Recorder of London in 1563. From 1557 to 1558 and 1562 to his death in 1571 he was Member of Parliament for Steyning, a tiny borough in Sussex. In 1559 he was elected MP for Aldborough, north Yorkshire. His religious sympathies were with the Puritan party, and the Spanish ambassador described him as a "furious heretic".

In 1566 he was appointed Solicitor General, and was summoned to attend the House of Lords by a writ of assistance. However, later the same year the Speaker of the Commons died, and the Privy Council chose Onslow to succeed him. At this period the appointment was effectively a Crown nomination, though theoretically the House of Commons had a free choice; Onslow was the royal candidate but was opposed, the only occasion on which this happened during the Elizabethan period. As is the convention, Onslow spoke in opposition to his own appointment, and argued that the independence of the Speakership was incompatible with the Solicitor General's oath to the Queen; this gave his critics good excuse to oppose, but he was nevertheless eventually approved by 82 votes to 70, and became Speaker on 2 October 1566. He was Speaker until its dissolution in January 1567.

Onslow may have been the author of Arguments Related to the Sea Landes and Salt Shores.

He married Catherine Harding, by whom he had two sons and five daughters, including Edward, ancestor of the Earls of Onslow, and Cicely, who married Sir Humphrey Winch.

Onslow died from 'pestilential fever' at Harnage near Shrewsbury, after visiting a relative in the town, in April 1571 and was buried in the then St Chad's Church in Shrewsbury where a tomb monument was erected, that was restored in 1742 by his descendant, Arthur Onslow, himself a past Speaker. After the fall of the church in 1788, the monument was moved to the Abbey Church in Shrewsbury, where it remains.

Legal offices
| Preceded by William Rosewell | Solicitor General for England and Wales; 1566–1569 | Succeeded by Sir Thomas Bromley |
Parliament of England
| Preceded by Thomas Williams | Speaker of the House of Commons; 1566–1571 | Succeeded by Sir Christopher Wray |
