= William Garrard =

Tudor magnate of London (1518–1571)

Sir William Garrard
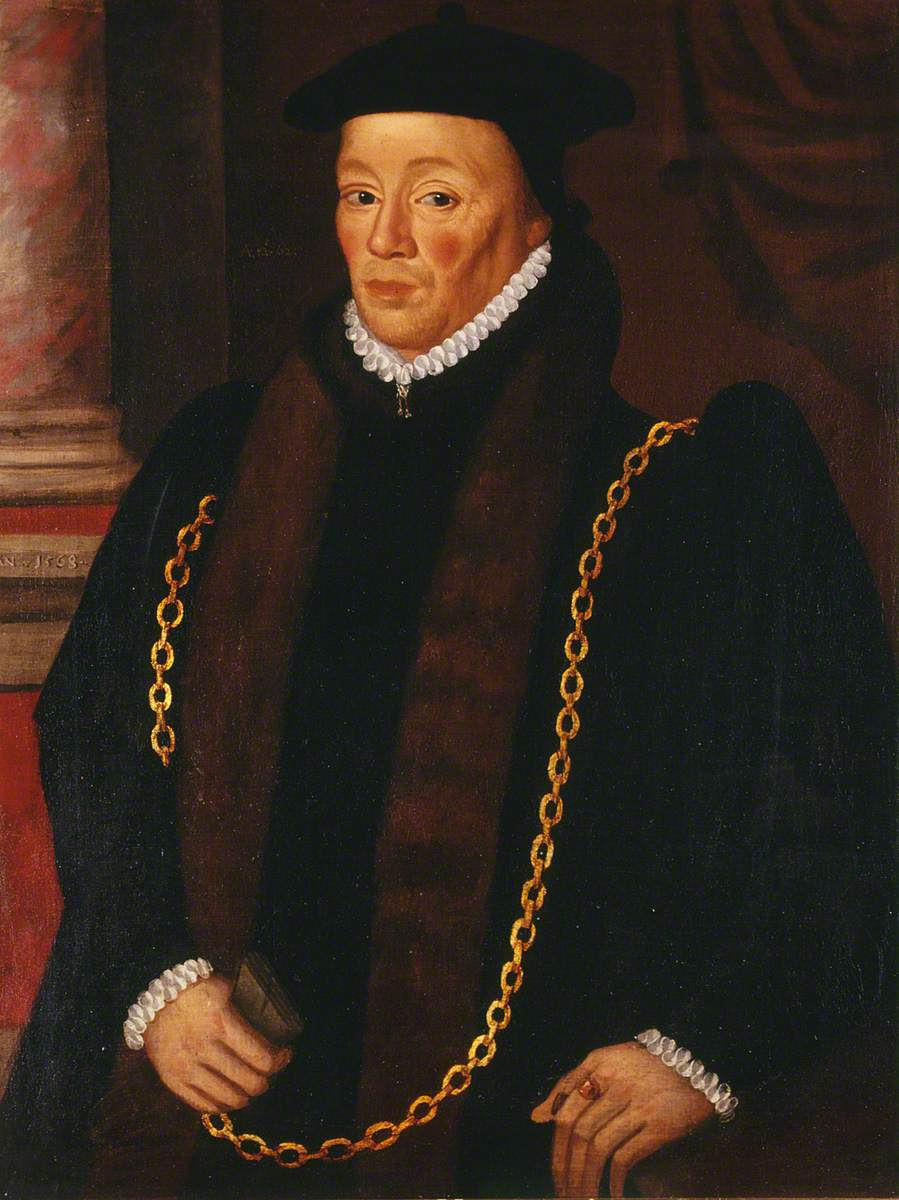

Lord Mayor of London
- In office 1555–1556
- Preceded by: John Lyon
- Succeeded by: Thomas Offley

Member of Parliament for London
- In office 1557–1558

Sheriff of London
- In office 1552–1553

Auditor of London
- In office 1556–1557

Personal details
- Born: 1507
- Died: 1571 (aged 63–64)
- Occupation: Merchant

Sir William Garrard (1507–1571), also Garrett, Gerrarde, etc., was a Tudor magnate of London, a merchant citizen in the Worshipful Company of Haberdashers, who became alderman, Sheriff (1552–1553) and Lord Mayor of London (1555–1556) and was returned as an MP for the City of London. He was a senior founding officer of the Company of Merchant Adventurers to New Lands (The Muscovy Company) in 1554/55, having been involved in its enterprises since the beginnings in King Edward VI's time, and for the last decade of his life was one of its permanent governors. He worked hard and invested largely to expand English overseas trade not only to Russia and the Levant but also to the Barbary Coast and to West Africa and Guinea.

In his late years Garrard and his Company or Society of Adventurers promoted mercantile trading expeditions to Guinea. Under the command entrusted to John Hawkins the expedition of 1567–1568 became the infamous (and disastrous) third slaving voyage to the West Indies. Garrard is also remembered for his labours on behalf of the London hospitals and for his efforts in practical help for poor and sick inhabitants of London. John Stow called him "a grave, sober, wise and discreete cittizen, equal with the best, and inferior to none of our time."

== Early life ==
William Garrard was descended from an old gentry family of Sittingbourne, Kent, which had formerly gone by the name of Attegare. Sir Simon Attegare, born 1365, was the father of Stephen, who altered the name to Garrard. Their mansion appears to have been the manor of Fulston in Sittingbourne, as suggested by their various tombs or burials in the part of the parish church relating to that place.

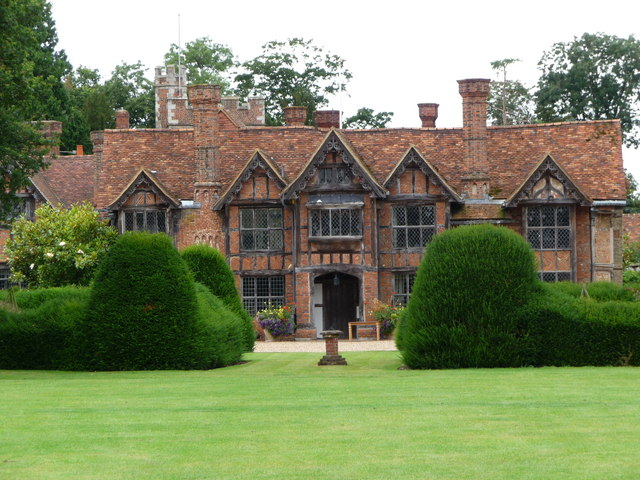
Dorney Court, Sir William Garrard's country residence near Windsor, 1542-1571

William was born in London, the son of John Garrard, citizen and Grocer, a prominent London businessman. He grew up in the parish of St Magnus-the-Martyr near London Bridge; he was admitted to the Worshipful Company of Haberdashers, and was married to Isabel Nethermill by 1539, when he was named an overseer in the will of his father-in-law Julian Nethermill of Coventry, who made small bequests to each of Garrard's children. In 1542 he purchased the manor of Dorney (in the far south of Buckinghamshire just west of Windsor) from the son of Richard Hill, who had held the manor from 1530 to 1540. Dorney Court remained his principal country seat throughout his life and became the inheritance of his eldest son. In 1545 he purchased the manor of Southfleet, in Kent, from Sir William Petre, which also became a family hereditament.

== Henrican and Edwardian ==
In 1545, he was appointed by the Court of Aldermen to be a Surveyor of the Poor, with the duties of trying to find ways to combat poverty, and continued in that work until 1549. He was chosen an alderman (for the London ward of Aldgate) in 1547, and served a term as Treasurer of St. Bartholomew's Hospital in 1548–1549. In 1550 he transferred to the Broad Street ward, and in 1556 to Lime Street, which he represented at the time of his death in 1571.

=== The shrieval year, 1552–1553 ===
In 1552 William Cecil, on behalf of King Edward VI, negotiated a £40,000 loan from the Merchant Adventurers through Garrard. In August Garrard was nominated to be one of the Sheriffs of London for 1552–1553 by the Lord Mayor (Richard Dobbs), while his elected counterpart, the Master Clothworker John Crymes, and after him two others, declined their election by the Commons: by a fourth election, John Maynard (Mercer) was successfully chosen to be Garrard's fellow sheriff, whereupon both were sworn to office on 28 September 1552. On the next day George Barne was elected Lord Mayor. As Barne was also a Haberdasher, this was a year of special influence for the company.

The shrievalty term spanned the death of Edward VI, the brief reign of Lady Jane Grey and the succession of Queen Mary I. Garrard was one of the signatories to the Letters Patent for the Limitation of the Crown. His official role in these memorable events appears in the narratives:

"The 10 of July at v of the clock in the afternone was proclamation made, with a trompetter, and 2 of the harouldes Kinges of Armes, and Mr Garret, the sheriffe, rydinge with them, of the death of our late soueraigne Edward VIth, and howe he had ordeyned by his letters patents, bearinge date the 21 of June last, the sayd Quene Jane to be heyre to the crowne of England and the heyres males of hir body lawfully begotten; which proclamation was made in 4 partes of the City of London, under the greate seale of England, bearinge date the 10 daye of July, in the Tower of London, and the first yeare of the raigne of Quene Jane, Quene of England, Fraunce and Ireland, Defender of the Fayth, and of the church of England and Ireland the supreme head".

On the next day he supervised the setting of a man in the Cheapside pillory, with both his ears nailed to it, which were then cut off as a herald read out his offence of having uttered seditious words during the proclamation. But then on 19 July, the Council seeing which way the wind was blowing, they called the mayor and sheriffs to Westminster, and rode with them up to the Cross in Cheap, where the Garter King of Arms, in his rich coat of arms and with his trumpeter, proclaimed Mary to be Queen. After singing the Te Deum in St Paul's, "the Council departed and commaunded Mr Garret the sheriffe with the Kinge of Armes and the trumpetter to see the proclamation made immedyately in other accustomed places within the City." On 29 July he rode with Sir Martin Bowes and Sir Henry Hubberthorne to New Hall in Essex to deliver a benevolence from the city to Queen Mary, and on 31 July it was his duty to hold Sir John Yorke under house arrest and to seal up his house.

Garrard was among the original developers of the Moroccan trade. He was, with John Yorke, Thomas Wroth and others, one of the promoters and investors in the second voyage to the Barbary Coast, which made its expedition in a small fleet led by Thomas Wyndham in May to October 1552. In 1553 the Merchant Adventurers of London sent out a first voyage to Guinea and the Kingdom of Benin, and in that voyage Wyndham became irrational, and died.

At this time Garrard was among the original Fellowship of the Merchant Adventurers to New Lands (the incipient Russia Company), for whom a royal charter was prepared under Edward VI but never sealed. According to Henry Lane, writing 33 years later, Garrard helped to finance the first voyage of the Merchant Adventurers to New Lands, the expedition of April 1553 promoted by Sebastian Cabot and led by Sir Hugh Willoughby in search of a Northeast Passage to Cathay, which failed in its declared objective, but resulted in Richard Chancellor's first diplomatic contacts with Tsar Ivan IV in Moscow. The succession crisis of 1553 drove Thomas Wroth into exile in Europe and found John Yorke in the Tower of London, but Queen Mary soon grasped the importance of the company to her rule and issued her own charter in February 1554/55.

== Marian ==
Among the first of Queen Mary's provisions was a commission of December 1553 to the Lord Mayor and the Bishop of London, together with various aldermen and others including William Garrard, to assist the poor prisoners in the Ludgate gaol by inspecting the cases of the debtors and their creditors and reaching equitable terms. In February 1555 he was one of a small group, led by Nicholas Hare, similarly commissioned to resolve the cases of debtors in the King's Bench Prison.

The second Guinea voyage, which set out in October 1554, was promoted by Sir George Barne, Sir John Yorke, Thomas Lok, Anthony Hickman and Edward Castelin, under the captaincy of John Lok. Their expedition was trading in Guinea when, in February 1554/55 Queen Mary, in her Charter of Incorporation for the Company of Merchant Adventurers to New Lands (Muscovy Company), constituted its governance under Sebastian Cabot as Governor, with Sir George Barne, William Garrard, Anthony Hussey and John Southcote as Consuls, and with twenty-four Assistants. (Two more Guinea voyages were made by William Towerson of London, in 1555 (Hart and Hinde both of London) and 1556 (Tyger and Hinde both of London).) The Muscovy Company was, meanwhile, busy with its own adventures.

=== The mayoral year ===
Having served as President of Christ's Hospital in 1553–1554, in 1555–56 Garrard was Lord Mayor of London, and, as was customary for that office, was knighted. Henry Machyn provides an account of the Lord Mayor's Pageant of 29 October 1555, as the Mayor, sheriffs and aldermen went by barge to Westminster for the oath-taking, and returned to St Paul's for festivities in customary fashion.

"... there were two goodly pinnaces decked with guns, flags and streamers, and a thousand pensells, the pinnaces painted, one white and blue, and the other yellow and red, and the oars and guns [of] like colour; and with trumpets and drums, and all the Crafts in barges and streamers; and at the 9 of the clock my new lord mayor and the sheriffs and the aldermen took barge at the Three Cranes with trumpets and shawms, and the waites playing; and so rode to Westminster, and took his oath in the Exchequer, and all the way the pinnace shooting off guns, and plying up and down; and so after came back to Paul's Wharf, and landed with great shooting of guns and playing; and so in Paul's Churchyard there met the bachelors and a goodly pageant, and a sixty-six men in blue gowns, and with goodly targets and javelins, and a devil; and four tall men like wodys [wild men] all in green, and trumpets playing afore the mayor." (spelling modernized).

The sheriffs for this term were Thomas Leigh (Mercer) and John Machell (Clothworker). This proved to be one of the bloodiest years of the Marian persecutions, placing a heavy burden upon the sheriffs. The first months of the mayoral year were occupied with the death and obsequies of Bishop Gardiner. Then followed the discovery of a treasonable plot, which occupied the Guildhall through the spring and early summer of 1556.

=== The Dudley treason trials ===
In March 1556 the Henry Dudley conspiracy to depose Mary was discovered, leading to a series of trials for high treason at the Guildhall over which the mayors presided as justices for oyer and terminer. On 29 April Sir William Garrard, as Lord Mayor, presided at the general indictment at the Guildhall, with Sir Rowland Hill, Sir Roger Cholmeley, and Mr Recorder Sir Ralph Cholmley. In June Sir John Gresham of Titsey took the place of Hill on the bench for the indictment of Silvestra Butler, in the same matter. William West, Lord la Warr, was indicted on 27 June before Garrard, Roger Cholmeley, John Gresham and George Barne, and on 2 July 1556 Garrard was still presiding at the indictments of Andrew Foster and Henry Smythe. Edmund and Francis Verney were indicted on 11 June before Garrard, sitting with William Laxton, Martin Bowes, Andrew Judd and Ralph Cholmley.

All these received pardons, but several others were tortured, condemned and executed. Sir Anthony Kingston is thought to have taken his own life in April, and Edward Lewknor, condemned with Francis Verney on 9 June, died a prisoner in the Tower of London in September. The monarch's suspicions were more generally aroused, and in November 1556 Garrard sat with Thomas Offley (then Lord Mayor), Martin Bowes and Ralph Cholmley, at the indictment of Sir John Braye, 2nd Baron Braye, who had failed in his duty of respect to the sovereign upon the day of coronation by voicing the wish that Elizabeth were reigning instead.

In 1556 Garrard transferred his aldermanry to the Lime Street ward (which he continued to represent up to the time of his death in 1571), and served as Auditor. He was the Master of the Haberdashers Company in 1557, and in that year was returned as Member of Parliament for City of London. In June 1557 Sir William and Lady Garrard were present as mourners (and executors) at the funeral at St Benet Sherehog of Mistress Hall (Katherine Geddyng), mother of the historian Edward Hall, author of Hall's Chronicle.

== Elizabethan ==
=== Bangor grammar school ===
William Garrard, together with Sir William Petre and Simon Lowe, were mourners at the funeral of Maurice Griffith, Bishop of Rochester at St Magnus-the-Martyr church (where Griffith was parson) on 30 November 1558, very soon after the death of Queen Mary. Griffith's will contained bequests intended for the foundation of a grammar school in Bangor (in Gwynedd). These endowments had originated with Geoffrey Glyn, who died in Cheapside in 1557, making his brother Dr William Glyn, Bishop of Bangor, and Bishop Griffith, responsible for implementing the foundation. William Glyn, however, died soon after his brother, and Griffith, feeling the approach of mortality, made William Garrard, William Petre and Simon Lowe his executors, leaving to them the matter of founding a school. Thus they became the founding trustees of the Friars School, Bangor.

=== Civic service ===
The former commission for the City and Diocese to regulate the grievances of the poor debtors in Ludgate was renewed in 1558, naming Garrard, Roger Cholmeley and William Chester among the principal commissioners. Garrard devoted much attention to drawing up constitutions for new hospitals. He was President of Bridewell Hospital in 1558–1559, and of St. Bartholomew's Hospital from 1559 to 1571.

Henry Machyn records Garrard's presence as a senior mourner at several civic funerals of this time, notably as chief mourner for Dame Alice Barne, widow of Sir George Barne, at St Bartholomew-the-Less in June 1559; and, together with Sir William Chester, Thomas Lodge and others at the June 1560 funeral of Anthony Hussey at St Martin, Ludgate. Both Barne (died 1558) and Hussey had been his fellow Consuls in the Muscovy Company charter. In March 1563 he was with Thomas Offley, William Chester and Christopher Draper among the mourners to St Andrew Undershaft for Alderman David Woodroffe, all original promoters of the company.

=== Loan to the Crown ===
In 1561, Garrard, along with Sir William Chester (Draper and Lord Mayor 1560–61), Thomas Lodge (Grocer and Lord Mayor 1562–63), and Humfrey Baskerville (Mercer and Sheriff 1561–62), and other prominent aldermen representing various Livery companies, loaned £30,000 to Queen Elizabeth. Regarding this, she exempted them from usury laws, allowing them to receive 10% interest on their loan. This was secured in August 1560 by a grant of rents and reversions upon leased lands, to the value of £33,000, which was surrendered by the grantees in February 1561/62. The management of the interest on the loan was licensed to the Fellowship of Merchant Adventurers in December 1561.

In 1563 one of the lenders, Thomas Lodge (then Lord Mayor), caused a scandal by falling heavily into debt "through losses by sea and land and evil debtors and otherwise", and, having his offers to negotiate repayment to his creditors refused, made petition to have his affairs determined by commission (effectively filing for bankruptcy). In April 1564 Martin Bowes, William Garrett and William Chester, with others, were appointed to resolve his affairs or to certificate their findings. The Lords of the Council at Windsor allowed an appeal to the Queen, who approved a stay of Lodge's credit and advanced £6000 to him to relieve his circumstances.

=== Judicial commissions ===
In November 1561 Garrard received a commission to work with Edward Warner (Lieutenant of the Tower), Sir William Hewett (Lord Mayor 1559–1560) and Thomas Seckford (Master of Requests) to restore to their proper uses the archery practise grounds within two miles of London (which were being unlawfully enclosed), with powers of enforcement. The same commission was renewed in April 1570.

In July 1562 he was enlisted in a great commission, under the bishops and chancellors, for the putting into effect of the new Acts of Uniformity (1558) and of Supremacy in the Church, to establish the Elizabethan Religious Settlement. They received powers to seek out and deal with heresy and sedition, with disrupters of divine service, absenters, vagrants and quarrelsome or suspicious types, and people using matrimony or religious pleadings unjustly to deprive others of their rights and property, and with notorious adulterers and fornicators. The commissioners were empowered to gather evidence, make investigations, to summon, examine and punish offenders, to inspect the statutes and ordinances of all religious foundations including cathedrals, colleges and grammar schools founded since the time of Henry VIII and to amend them as necessary, and to certificate their defects. Any three of the commissioners were to be a quorum, provided one were the archbishop, a bishop, or Walter Haddon, Thomas Seckford (both Masters of Requests in Ordinary), Sir William Garrard or Sir Thomas Smith.

In June 1563 he was among the commissioners appointed for the finding-out of forgery, murders, felonies and burglaries throughout the realm (a commission renewed in 1565), and from 1564 to 1570 he was included annually in commissions for sewers, usually in Middlesex.

== Later voyages and trade ==
=== Muscovy Company ===
In the first years of Elizabeth's reign Garrard was also closely involved in the continuing development of trade and diplomatic relations with Russia. The exploratory voyages led by Anthony Jenkinson, with Arthur Edwards and others for the Muscovy Company rapidly enlarged the understandings which had been begun through the voyages of Richard Chancellor and through the relations with the Russian Court developed by the dramatic arrival of the Russian ambassador in England during Thomas Offley's mayoralty of 1556–1557. They now extended through Persia, the Caspian Sea and Astrakhan (as the Khanate was suppressed) northwards towards Moscow as well as through the northern routes. In these continuing affairs Andrew Judd, Thomas Lodge, William Chester and others shared with Garrard the governance of the company, in which Garrard himself remained continuously from 1561 until his death.

Queen Elizabeth granted to the Company of Merchant Adventurers of England a new Charter of Incorporation in July 1564, in which Garrard's name appeared twice, as one of the principals of the Fellowship, and as first-named among the assistants to the governor of that Company. The Company of Adventurers to New Lands in turn received their own second Charter of Incorporation, as "The Merchants Adventurers for the Discovering of New Trades", in 1566. This charter was confirmed by act of Parliament.

In Jenkinson's successful expedition, in 1567 Tsar Ivan IV was persuaded to grant exclusive trading rights to Garrard and his Company, naming Garrard personally in his letter to Queen Elizabeth I, and closing the northern routes through the White Sea to Colmogro to all other trade. "We for our sisters sake Elizabeth have granted, out of what kingdome soever it be, England or other, that none besides sir William Garrard and his company shall not come in trade or merchandise nor otherwise to Colmogro, nor to the river Ob, nor within Wardhouse... nor to any mouth of the [northern] river Dwina, nor to any part of the north countrey of our coast." The document names the other principal representatives as William Chester, Rowland Heyward, Lawrence Hussie, John Marsh, Anthony Jenkinson and William Rowly.

In the (Muscovy) Company's trading expedition led by Christopher Hoddesdon in 1569, Garrard responded effectively when Hoddesdon, arriving at Narva, at once recognized the insufficiency of capacity in his three ships both for their return freight and their protection. Garrard sent out a fleet of thirteen sail in September 1570, led by William Borough, to support him against freebooters. They successfully captured 83 of the pirates and delivered them with a letter to the Emperor of Russia, reserving only one, Captain Haunce Snarke, who had shown leniency towards the English mariners.

=== West Africa ===
Garrard also resumed his mercantile ventures in Africa. The five adventurers proposing a voyage to Guinea in 1561, Garrard, William Wynter (Surveyor of the Navy and Master of Navy Ordnance), Benjamin Gonson (Treasurer of the Navy since 1549), Anthony Hickman and Edward Castelin, looked for John Lok to lead the expedition, but Lok declined the offer. Following the Queen's charter-party for the Minion and the Primrose to engage in African trade in 1562, Sir William Chester took Winter's place among the promoters of the Guinea voyage of February 1562/63 to August 1563, for the ivory trade, described in William Rutter's report from the Primrose. This was not the same as the Guinea expedition led by Sir John Hawkins in October 1562 in the Salomon, the Swallow and the Janus, on behalf of Gonson and Wynter, Lionel Duckett, Thomas Lodge and Mr. Bromfield, in which Hawkins "purchased" Africans and carried them off as slaves to the West Indies.

The same company of chief adventurers (Garrard, Chester, Gonson, Hickman and Castelin) promoted a further Guinea trading expedition in 1564, in the Minion, the John Baptist of London, and the Merlin: this is sometimes confused with John Hawkins's second slaving voyage, because Hawkins (after setting out in the Jesus of Lubeck, the Tiger, the Salomon and the pinnaceSwallow) ran into a heavy storm which also dispersed the other expedition. He was able to accompany them safely to Tenerife before the two parties went about their separate affairs. The meeting at Garrard's house in 1564 was to top-up funds for the Guinea expedition, which lost a number of men to hostile action but limped home with a cargo of gold and ivory. In 1565 Hawkins was awarded heraldic arms: the crest was a demi Moor in his proper colour, bound and captive, with annulets in his arms and ears, in acknowledgement of his role in the Atlantic slave trade.

=== Voyage of 1567–1568 ===
John Hawkins, in his account of his third slaving voyage of 1568, implicated Garrard and his Company in his expedition. It was overtly prompted by reports of large gold resources in the Guinea hinterland, a region under a Portuguese trading monopoly. Upon these matters William Garrard, William Wynter, Benjamin Gonson and Lionel Duckett deliberated how to venture, and Queen Elizabeth and William Cecil pondered in responding to Hawkins's request for a licence. They were well aware that he had used two previous Guinea expeditions as opportunities to convey "negro" slaves to the West Indies, but assured Diego Guzmán de Silva, the Spanish ambassador, that no Indies expedition was intended. Hawkins himself, who openly denied any such intention, had laid in a very great quantity of dried beans suitable to feed a human cargo for the transatlantic crossing, and dainty textiles more suited to the Hispanic than to the African trade.

Hawkins, by his testimony, stated that the "articulate" (i.e. contracting) Sir William Garrard, Rowland Hayward and others of their Society and Company furnished a fleet of six ships for a voyage to the coast of Guinea and other foreign regions, for merchandize to be had with the inhabitants of those countries. Sir William Garrard and Company provided, prepared and laded into the ships suitable merchandize to the value of about £16,500. He said that Garrard and others of the company had the direction of the voyage, and by their authority committed to Hawkins not only the command of the fleet but to consider for himself the "state of the Traffic" in the places they came to. By a letter of September 1567, waiting to depart from Plymouth, Hawkins notified the queen of his intention to "lade negroes in Genoya and sell them in the West Indyes, in truck of gold, perles and esmeraldes".

Hawkins arrived on the Guinea coast in November 1567, and, with other merchants appointed by the company, captured and purchased "a good quantity of Negroes" and set off with them for the West Indies. Whether this was the intention of the promoters or not, the expedition ended in disaster, inaugurated the Anglo-Spanish trade war of 1568–1573, cost Garrard £21,000 and damned his historical reputation.

=== Civic apotheosis ===
At the chartering of the Company of Mineral and Battery Works in May 1568, Garrard was named the first Governor of the Society, jointly with alderman Rowland Hayward, who became Lord Mayor in 1570.

Garrard became Surveyor-General of the hospitals for 1566–1567, and Comptroller-General of the city's hospitals from 1568 (succeeding Sir Martin Bowes) until his death in September 1571. In both roles he was succeeded by Sir Thomas Offley.

In 1566, he contributed finance toward the creation of Sir Thomas Gresham's first Royal Exchange. He was named a commissioner of the undertaking. In February 1565/66 there was a meeting at Sir John Rivers's residence to witness and celebrate the finalization of the plans for the exchange, at which Gresham personally shook hands with Garrard before the assembled company. The building was opened in 1570 during a celebration by the Queen.

Garrard sat with Alexander Avenon, John Southcote and Thomas Wroth in an inquisition at the Guildhall into a case of coin-clipping in January 1570/71; and as Governor of the Muscovy Company he received a royal licence for certain freights for urgent causes on 6 August 1571. Less than two months later he was dead.

== Death and burial ==
According to John Stow, "Sir William Garrard, haberdasher, maior of London in the year of Christ 1555, deceased 1571, in the parishe of Seint Christofer by the Stok Market, but was buried in this parishe church of Seint Magnus, because he was borne in that parishe, and there babtized." On 4 November 1572 his son William received licence to enter upon his father's lands. Garrard was the subject of one of the epitaphs of John Phillips.

== Will ==
William Garrard, by his will written 15 April 1570 requested burial with a monument and vault at St Magnus on the south side of St Katheryn's chapel between the vestry door and the east end. He first made provision for the completion of arrangements concerning the school at Bangor, including various contributions towards stipends and other endowments. The main body of his will is concerned with the distribution and entail of his lands and properties, principally his London and Dorney residences and his estates at Sittingbourne, Longfield, Southfleet, Bermondsey, Bexley and in the Isle of Sheppey, between his wife, his four sons and his daughter. Provision is also made for various nephews and nieces, and there is an extensive list of gifts to the Hospitals and Prisons, to the poor of Dorney, to the Lord Mayor and civic officials, and notably to John Southcote, Sir Thomas and Lady Offley, Sir Thomas and Lady Leigh, to Sir William Petre, Dr Lawrence Hussey, and to the Haberdashers' Company. His widow Dame Isabelle Garrard is his sole executrix and his overseers are his eldest son William and his son-in-law George Barne (the younger). The will was proved by Dame Isabelle on 12 January 1571/72.

Dame Isabelle did not live long to enjoy the benefits of the estate. She made her will on 22 February 1572/73 with a further date of 22 March, and it was proved on 4 May 1573 by her executors, her son John Garrard and daughter Anne Barne. Her sons William, George and John are married with children, and her daughter Anne has eight sons who are listed by name. Both wills refer to silver plate given to the family by Katheryn Hall. Isabelle desires to be buried in her husband's vault at St Magnus, though she is living in St Christopher's parish. The lease of the house where she dwells, and other houses in the alley adjacent, and also the reversion of the house at the sign of the Swan in Bucklersbury, are to be sold for the performance of the will. She gives the advowson of the rectory of Frindsbury in Kent to her son Peter Garrard. The overseers are her son George Garrard and William Widnell, citizen and Merchant Taylor of London.

=== Portrait ===
A portrait from life of Sir William Garrard in oil on canvas, dated c. 1568 (artist unknown), shows him in his fur-trimmed robe and wearing a long gold chain. This was presented to the City of London Corporation in 1959 by a Garrard family member. It is held in the Guildhall Art Gallery, London, and measures about 3 ft by 2 ft.

=== Heraldry ===
Arthur Collins cited for John Garrard, father of Sir William, arms as follows: "Argent, on a fess sable a lion passant of the first." The 1634 Visitation of Buckinghamshire shows for Sir William the same arms, adding a Crest awarded by Robert Cooke, Clarenceux, on 26 October 1570: "A leopard seijant proper". The arms of Garrard and Nethermill quarterly, with the leopard crest, are shown centrally upon the monument to Sir John Garrard (grandson of Sir William) and Elizabeth Barkham at St Helen, Wheathampstead, Hertfordshire.

== Family ==
Before 1539, William Garrard married Isabel Nethermill (died 1573), sister of the Coventry MP Sir John Nethermill and daughter of Coventry draper Julian Nethermill (died 11 April 1539) and his wife Joan. Of their children:

- Sir William Garrard (c. 1538–1607), eldest son, married Elizabeth, daughter of Sir Thomas Rowe (Lord Mayor of London), in 1568. Elizabeth died in 1624.
- Sir George Garrard, 2nd son, married Margaret, daughter of the MP George Dacres.
- Sir John Garrard (c. 1546–1625), 3rd son, married (c. 1573) to Jane (died 1616), daughter of Richard Partridge (Haberdasher). According to an inscription on a monument formerly in the south aisle of the chancel of St Magnus's church, they had 13 children of whom five died young, and of whom two sons and six daughters were living at the time of his death in 1625. Sir John Garrard, or Gerrard, citizen and Haberdasher, was Lord Mayor of London in 1601. He was progenitor of the Garrard baronets.
- Peter Garrard, 4th son.
- Anne Garrard married Sir George Barne (died 1593). In 1573 her sons were William, George, Frances, Thomas, John, Mark, Peter and Richard.
