= Edward Onslow (died 1615) =

English landowner

Sir Edward Onslow or Anslow of Knowle Park, in the parish of Cranleigh, Surrey (1562–1615), was an English landowner. The son of a Speaker of the House of Commons, and the father of a very notable Parliamentarian, he was the first of his family to be knighted.

== Parentage and Estates ==
He was a son of the lawyer and Recorder of London Richard Onslow (1528–1571) and Catherine Harding (died 1574). His parents are buried at St Chad's Church, Shrewsbury. His elder brother Robert died young. Richard Onslow, who became Speaker of the House of Commons for 1566–67, acquired a very substantial estate at Cranleigh, and also had large possessions in Middlesex, Shropshire, Gloucestershire, Sussex and Wiltshire. When in London his residence was at the Blackfriars Convent, granted to him by Queen Elizabeth.

In 1549 William Harding of London, Mercer, died making a bequest of Knowle to his daughter Catherine. Richard Onslow married her in 1559 and the manor passed to the Onslows early in 1561. The adjoining manor of Holdhurst was conveyed to Richard Onslow at the end of 1568, and a moiety thereof was again conveyed to Edward Onslow in the autumn of 1584. The transepts of the church of Cranleigh contain two family chapels, that in the south transept being the Onslow chapel.

Edward Onslow is said to have been a childhood friend of Philip Sidney's, during his youthful days at Shrewsbury. He inherited Knowle around 1606. It was said of him, that he was "eminent for his virtue, and sanctity of life." Sir Edward died on 2 April 1615, making his will on the previous day, making bequests to his eldest son Thomas and his youngest son Richard. His widow Elizabeth survived until August 1630 and also left a will mentioning a daughter married to John Duncombe, and a daughter married to Edward Carr, and various other family relationships.

It is told that a portrait of Sir Edward Onslow formerly hung at Knowle.

== Marriage ==
Edward Onslow married Elizabeth or Isabel Shirley (died 1630) at St Ann Blackfriars on 23 November 1584. She was a daughter of Sir Thomas Shirley of Wiston or Westmeston, West Sussex. Their children included:

- Thomas Onslow (1596–1616), who married Mary daughter of Sir Samuel Lennard in 1616, but died soon after without issue.
- Richard Onslow (born 1601), of West Clandon, married Elizabeth, daughter of Arthur Strangways of London, and was the grandfather of Arthur Onslow, Speaker of the House of Commons.
- Elizabeth Onslow, married Christopher Gardner of Dorking
- Jane Onslow, married (1) to Sir Edward Carr of London and of Hillingdon, Middlesex, and (2) in February 1637/38, to Gerald Aungier, 2nd Baron Aungier of Longford, of East Clandon.
- Mary Onslow, married John Duncombe (c. 1600–1640) of Weston in Albury, Surrey, son of George Duncombe (Steward of Bramley, died 1646), and his wife Judith Carrill. Mary died in 1668.
