= Aunger =

Aunger is a surname. Notable people with the surname include:

- Robert Aunger (fl. 1390s), English politician
- Geoff Aunger (born 1968), Canadian soccer player
