= Francis Aungier, 1st Baron Aungier of Longford =

British lawyer (1558–1632)

The Right Honourable The Lord Aungier of Longford
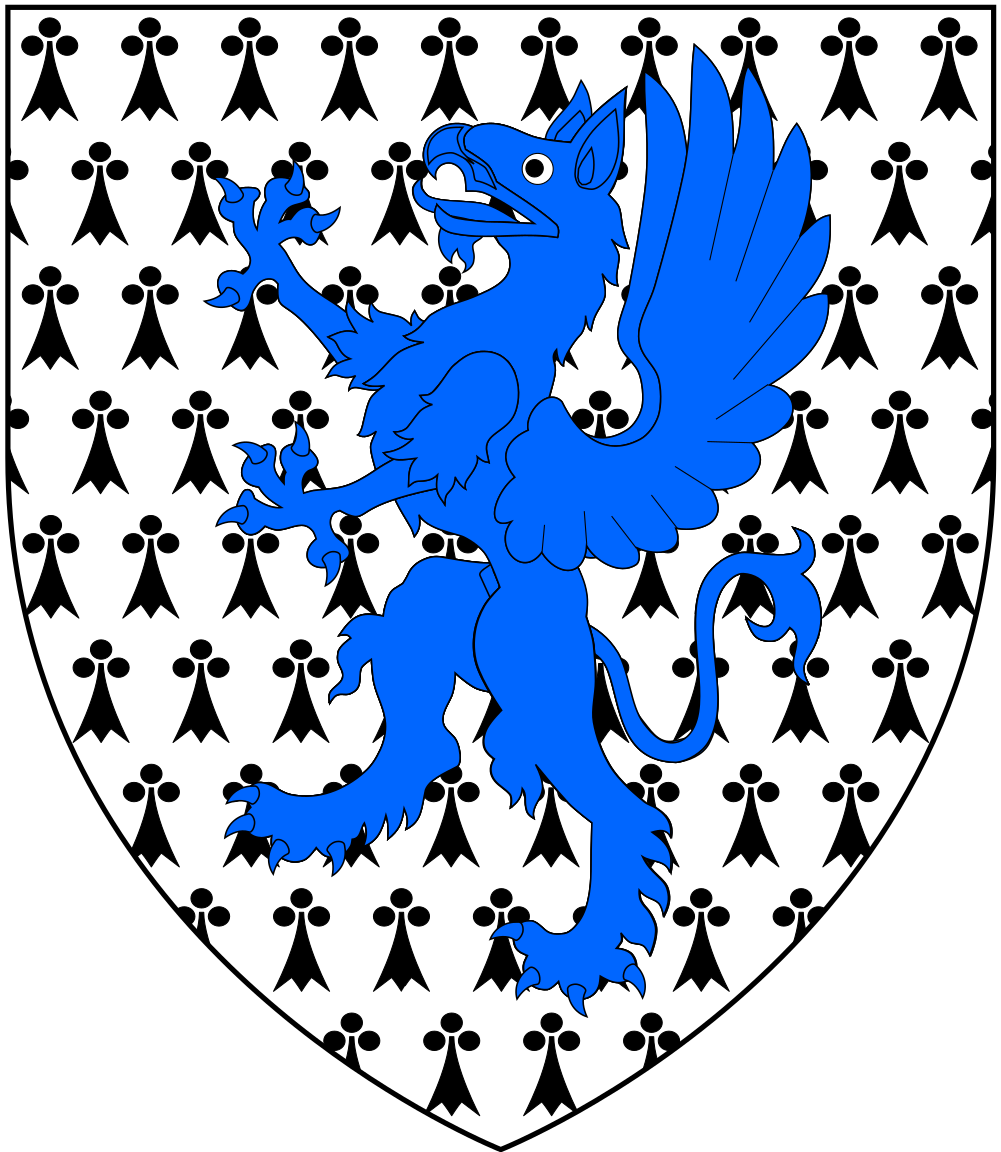
- Arms of Aungier: Ermine, a griffin segreant azure

Master of the Rolls in Ireland
- In office 1609–1632
- Monarchs: James I, Charles I

Member of House of Lords
- In office 1614–1614

Justice of Assize

Personal details
- Born: Francis Aungier; 1558 Cambridge, England
- Died: 1632 (aged 73–74) Dublin, Ireland
- Occupation: judge
- Profession: lawyer

Francis Aungier, 1st Baron Aungier of Longford (1558–1632), also known as Lord Aungier, was the progenitor of the Earldom of Longford, member of the House of Lords, Privy Councillor for Ireland and Master of the Rolls in Ireland under James I and Charles I.

== Career ==
=== Youth and education, 1558-1584 ===
Francis was born in 1558 (baptized 14 May) in Coton, Cambridgeshire, the eldest son (of six) of Richard Aungier, Esq. of Cambridge and his wife Rose, daughter of William Steward. His father Richard matriculated from Pembroke College, Cambridge in 1545, becoming an original Fellow of Trinity College, Cambridge in the following year: he was a barrister and a member of Gray's Inn (admitted 1551), as well as a substantial landowner. Richard, one of the executors of Thomas Butts in 1592, was a benefactor of Corpus Christi College, contributing to the glazing of the old chapel there: his arms (Ermine a griphon segreant azure beaked and membered or) appeared in glass later relocated to the oriel window of the college hall. Francis Aungier, his eldest son, attended Westminster School, where he was a Queen's Scholar in 1570; he was elected to Trinity College, Cambridge in 1573, where he matriculated and was admitted scholar in 1574. Admitted to Gray's Inn in 1577, and allowed admittance to his father's chambers in his absence in 1579, he was called to the bar on 17 June 1583. (His brother John Aungier followed in his footsteps to Westminster and Trinity, where he became a Senior Fellow.)

=== Career in England, 1584-1609 ===
Francis, following his first marriage (at Rushbrooke, West Suffolk in 1584) to Douglas, sister of Gerald FitzGerald (future 14th Earl of Kildare), became member of parliament for Newcastle-under-Lyme (1588-1589). By token of his marriage, in 1590 he received the bequest of the rectory of Woking and other property thereabouts from the Countess of Lincoln ("The Fair Geraldine"), proprietor of Hatchlands Park in Surrey, who appointed him executor of her will. He settled at East Clandon, where he became a friend of Sir William More of Loseley. His signature can be seen as a commissioner, with William and George More, Laurence Stoughton and John Agmondesham, in a 1591/92 warrant for the summons of a Surrey recusant. The children of his first marriage were baptized at East Clandon during the 1590s, and he was elected to the "graunde company" (i.e., a Bencher) of Gray's Inn in 1593.

In November 1597 his father, very soon after having been elected Treasurer of Gray's Inn for the third time (previously in 1578 and 1585), and being a governing member of that Society of long standing, was murdered in his own chambers. The body, which had been thrown into the Thames, was recovered and was buried in the chapel of St Thomas of Canterbury at East Clandon on 17 December 1597. Richard Aungier, a younger brother of Francis, was hanged for the crime at Tyburn on 25 January 1598. Francis Aungier's youngest child of his first marriage was baptized at very much the same time, and Francis sat in parliament for Haslemere from September 1597 to February 1597/98.

His first wife (Douglas FitzGerald) died in 1600, a year after her brother Gerald had succeeded as Earl of Kildare and member of the Council of Sir George Carew, Lord President of Munster. She was buried in the chapel of St Thomas of Canterbury at East Clandon (according to the register), where, however, John Aubrey found no memorials to the Aungiers. After various negotiations, in August 1600 Aungier sold his freehold lands and properties around Coton, Whitwell, Cambridge, Barton and Madingley to King's College in Cambridge. In his own profession, Francis became a member of several jurisdictions, justice of the peace for Surrey from 1592/93, and, after becoming Reader of Gray's Inn in 1602, j.p. for Guildford in 1604-1609 . He was a sufficiently gifted lawyer to earn the praise of Francis Bacon. His second marriage, to Anne Barne, a daughter of Sir George Barne the younger and granddaughter of Sir William Garrard, wove into his kinship the most prominent maritime-mercantile and civic families of Elizabethan London, and produced further offspring who were baptized at East Clandon between 1605 and 1609.

=== Career in Ireland, 1609-1632 ===
In May 1609 he was knighted at Greenwich by King James I, and towards the end of that year the King appointed him to the office of Master of the Rolls in Ireland. He was a commissioner for the Plantation of escheated lands in Ulster proclaimed in August 1610, and in 1611, with Sir John Denham and others, he compiled the Judges' Report of existing statutes against the extolling, advancement or maintaining of the See of Rome within the Kingdom of Ireland. By 1611, he was sworn to the Privy Council for Ireland. Early in 1612 the Earl of Kildare died: the King appointed that when Gerald, his newborn heir, should reach the age of five, then Sir Francis Aungier and Donogh O'Brien, 4th Earl of Thomond should have care of his education.

Aungier became very assiduous and indefatigable in the circuits of the Assizes, being noted for his attention to detail and, where necessary, for his severity, by which he helped to implement and enforce the Plantations of Ireland. In March 1613/14, for example, he appears as Justice of Assize and Gaol Delivery for the trial of prisoners in County Cavan, province of Ulster, including one case of treason resulting in execution, but also with many acquittals. He attended the House of Lords in 1614; he served as commissioner for the Plantation of Munster in 1616 and for County Longford in 1620. In March 1615, with Sir John Davies, Attorney-General for Ireland, he conducted that important inquisition by which the spoliation of the liberties and endowments of the city of Limerick (which had been leased among themselves at low rents by members of the Corporation, at the cost of the citizenry), was identified and exposed. He advised in the inquiry begun under Arthur Chichester into the Earl of Ormonde's title in the liberties of Tipperary in 1615-1616, finding that title to be very weak: under Lord Deputy Oliver St John, as a Council signatory in February 1617 he approved commissioners for the seizure of the liberties of Waterford in readiness for its new royal charter.

Sir Francis made his third marriage in or after 1614. Margaret, a daughter of Sir Thomas Cave (died 1613) of Stanford-on-Avon, Northamptonshire, was first married to (Sir) John Wynn (c. 1584-1614), eldest son of Sir John Wynn, 1st Baronet, of Gwydir Castle (1553-1627). That marriage is said to have been unhappy, and John Wynn, who took to travelling in Italy, died at Lucca in Tuscany at a young age. Margaret then took Sir Francis Aungier as her second husband, and was his consort through his career in Ireland, but the union brought no further issue. (Having survived him, she afterwards married Sir Thomas Wenman of Dublin, provost-marshal of Munster 1629-1637.) Aungier was granted proprietorship of the town of Longford by James I around 1615; in 1617-1618 he purchased the manor of Granard in the Annaly of County Longford from Dame Mary Shane, and was granted licence to hold a second market and two fairs there.

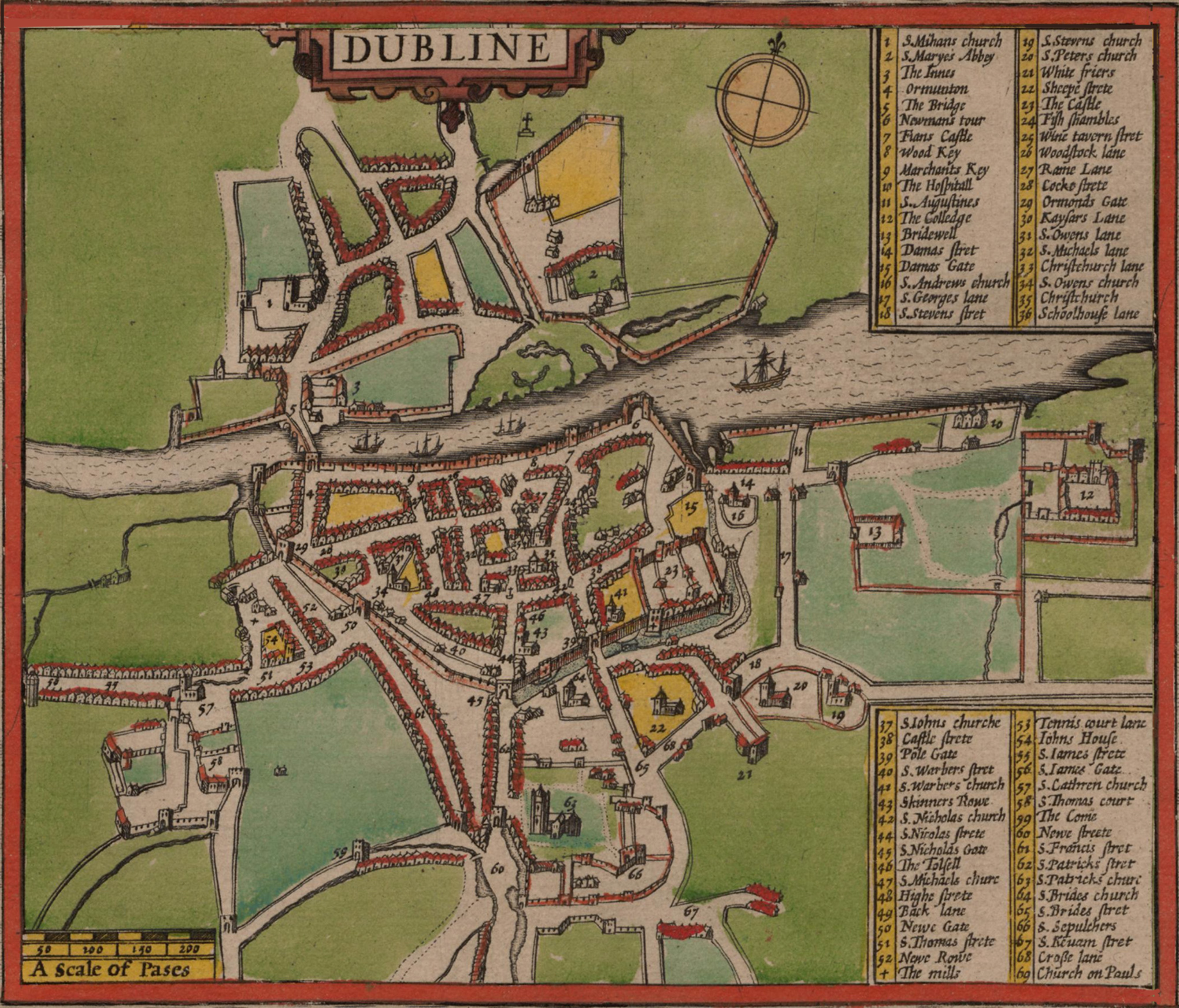
Dublin in 1610, as represented by John Speed.

In Dublin, Aungier's residence was in a mansion at the site of the White Friars, the dissolved Carmelite Friary. Although many accounts state that he held this in the time of Queen Elizabeth, the patent of licence for alderman Robert Ball to alienate the house and all its hereditaments to Aungier's nominee of choice, to the use of Sir Francis and his heirs forever, is dated to 1 February in the 14th year of James I (i.e. 1617/18). In 1619, briefly, during the vacancy created by the death of the Lord Chancellor of Ireland Archbishop Thomas Jones, he was jointly a commissioner of the Great Seal of Ireland with Sir William Jones and Sir William Methold, until the appointment of Adam Loftus, 1st Viscount Loftus as Chancellor.

His responsibilities towards his nephew Gerald, the 15th Earl of Kildare, ceased when the child died in 1620. In 1621, he was created Lord Aungier, Baron of Longford by patent, in which it was stated that he descended from the Counts of Aungier, of France; the grant was made in recognition of his loyal and assiduous service in the state offices and affairs of Ireland, and not least for his efforts on behalf of the Plantations of Ulster, Leitrim, Longford and Leinster. As a member of the Council of Lord Deputy Henry Cary, 1st Viscount Falkland, he subscribed to the Proclamation of 1623 for the banishing of Jesuits and priests from Ireland.

He was re-appointed Master of the Rolls for Ireland by King Charles I in 1625, who made him a further grant of lands in County Longford and County Leitrim in 1626. He was deputized Lord High Steward of Ireland in June 1628 to preside in the trial by his peers of Lord Dunboyne, who was acquitted of his indictment for manslaughter. Also in 1628 Aungier's second son Ambrose was appointed Treasurer of St Patrick's Cathedral: the next year Ambrose was inducted to a Cathedral prebend, and at about this time married Archbishop Bulkeley's daughter Grisell.

Late in 1628 Aungier took offence at the King's disparagement, before the Council in Westminster, of his testimony concerning the Earl of Cork's behaviour in Chancery: Charles, advised of Aungier's special worth, reconsidered his own words and sent him assurances of princely favour. In 1629 Lord Aungier was called to administer the oaths of governance and supremacy to Adam Loftus and Richard Boyle as Lords Justices. In 1629 and 1630 Aungier was occupied in the suit of Sir James Barrett of Castlemore, County Cork, seeking restitution of his lands at the Cork Assizes, where the jury found a corrupt verdict against him upon wholly inadequate premisses: Aungier relocated the hearings to Waterford, to obtain an acceptable verdict.

=== Death and estate ===
Lord Aungier died in Dublin in 1632, leaving a will dated 1628. Subject to his wife lady Margaret's free enjoyment of estates and hereditaments designated as her jointure (including lands at Marsland in Cambridgeshire), he entailed his manors and estates in England and Ireland (in Dublin and Longford) upon his sons, first upon Gerald and upon his lawful male issue, and in default of such issue upon his son Ambrose and his male heirs; or in default, upon his son George and his male heirs; or in default, upon Francis and his male heirs. Gerald was to ensure a good conveyance was to be made to this effect, even though some of the four sons were of half-blood to the others (George and Francis being sons of his second wife). Gerald was to have all his history books and "books of discourse", Ambrose to have his divinity books, and Francis all his law books: it was evidently a worthwhile library.

He drew up a schedule of plate, textiles and hangings, household goods and utensils which were by a bond of agreement to be bequeathed to Margaret, including all the household stuff at Longford, the fireplace equipment from the dining room at Whitefriars, and his new coach and four coach-horses lately brought out of England, on condition that she accept these for her claim on his goods and chattells. He appointed his sons Gerald and Ambrose, and his trusty servant Ralph Leventhorpe, his executors, and (mentioning particularly the Lord Deputy, the Lord Chancellor and the Archbishop) he called upon the entire Privy Council of Ireland "in the waie of Justice to patronize and defend my wife and children against all wrongs." Gerald swore to administer probate, the other executors deferring, in London on 27 February 1632/33. In 1637 one Ralph Leventhorpe, Esq., was a landowner and churchwarden in St Werburgh's parish, Dublin, living in Gun Alley, and from 1639 to 1649 he was M.P. for Ennis.

Lord Aungier requested a simple burial "in the little Chappell neere my dwellinge house in Dublin privately without funerall pompe", and was first interred there; but later in the same year his body was translated to St Patrick's Cathedral, where he received an heraldic funeral with a grand formal attendance. He was succeeded in 1633 as Master of the Rolls by Christopher Wandesford, and as 2nd Baron Aungier by his son Gerald, who died in 1655.

== Aungier estate in Dublin ==
An urban development was laid out in the seventeenth century on the Dublin estates given by his grandson and namesake Francis Aungier, 1st Earl of Longford (1632-1700). In 1677, Aungier Street in Dublin was dedicated in honour of his family.

== Marriage and issue ==
Aungier was married three times, and had several children through his marriages.

He married first, on 12 August 1584 at Rushbrooke, West Suffolk, to Douglas Fitzgerald ("Douglas Garret"), (died 1600), sister of the future 14th Earl of Kildare. The East Clandon register, recording her burial there on 1 June 1600, describes her as "mulier pietate, virtute et stemmate honoris florens", a woman flowering in piety, virtue and honourable descent. (Sir Ambrose Copinger (died 1604), of Dawley Court, Middlesex, a grandson of Sir Thomas Jermyn of Rushbrooke, had married Douglas's sister Lettice FitzGerald weeks previously. The names Lettice and Ambrose derived from this example, as the East Clandon register shows.) They had issue:

- Elizabeth Aungier (baptized 12 December 1585). She married (1) in January 1607/08, to Simon Caryll (c. 1577-1619), son of John Caryll and Lettice Lane, (2) in February 1619/20, to Richard Barne, son of Sir George Barne (died 1593) and Anne Gerrard, and (3) in February 1624/25, to John Machell (c. 1580-1647), (son of Mathew Machell and Mary Lewknor) of Great Tangley, Shalford, Surrey. Elizabeth died in 1650.
- Lettice Aungier (baptized 25 May 1591), who married (1) Edward Cherry of Dublin, son and heir of Sir Francis Cherry, (2) Sir William Danvers, and (3) Sir Henry Holcroft, Secretary for the Irish Causes. She was living in 1639, when addressed in a printed funeral sermon for her niece, and apparently so in 1649 when Holcroft made his will, of which she was an executor.
- Frances Aungier (baptized 2 November 1592, buried 11 November 1604), daughter.
- Gerald Aungier, 2nd Baron Aungier of Longford ("Garret"), (baptized 23 March 1594/95), heir, died 1655, who married in February 1637/38 to Jane, daughter of Sir Edward Onslow and Elizabeth Shirley, and relict of Sir Edward Carr of Hillingdon. Gerald was an accomplished student of antique and oriental languages, and both a patron and student of his near kinsman William Oughtred, who wrote very highly of him.
- Ambrose Aungier (baptized 12 September 1596), of Westminster School, Trinity College and Clare College, Cambridge. He became Chancellor of St. Patrick's Cathedral, and married Grisel Bulkeley, daughter of the Archbishop of Dublin, Lancelot Bulkeley. He was the father of Francis Aungier, 1st Earl of Longford (c. 1632-1700), Gerald Aungier the first Governor of Bombay (c. 1640-1677), and Ambrose Aungier, 2nd Earl of Longford (c. 1649-1704). Ambrose Aungier died in 1654.
- Thomas Aungier (baptized 27 November 1597). He died 5 May 1626.

He married secondly Anne Barne, daughter of Sir George Barne (died 1593) and Anne Garrard, and relict of Walter Marler, citizen and Salter of London, and had issue:

- George Aungier, living in 1628 (third of the four sons named in Lord Aungier's will, written 1628).
- John Aungier (baptized 7 July 1605, buried 24 February 1606/07).
- Francis Aungier (baptized 3 August 1607), son, of Clare College, Cambridge (1622), and Gray's Inn: he died in 1652.
- Robert Aungier (baptized 6 April 1609).

He married thirdly Margaret Cave, daughter of Sir Thomas Cave (died 1613) of Stanford Hall and Eleanor St. John. Margaret Cave married first, Sir John Wynn (eldest son of Sir John Wynn, 1st Baronet), who died 1614; second Sir Francis Aungier (died 1632); and third Sir Thomas Wenman of Dublin, provost-marshal of Munster. They had no issue.

Peerage of Ireland
New creation	Baron Aungier of Longford; 1621–1632	Succeeded by Gerald Aungier
