= George Barne (died 1593) =

Lord Mayor of London (c.1532–1593)

Sir George Barne

Lord Mayor of London
- In office 1586–1587
- Preceded by: Wolstan Dixie
- Succeeded by: Sir George Bonde

Member of Parliament for London
- In office 1588–1589

Sheriff of London
- In office 1576–1577

Auditor of London
- In office 1574–1574

Personal details
- Born: 1532
- Died: 1593 (aged 60–61)
- Occupation: merchant

Sir George Barne (c. 1532–1593) was a prominent merchant and public official from London during the reign of Elizabeth I, and son of Sir George Barne (died 1558) and Alice Brooke.

== Life ==
Barne, a haberdasher of London, was an Alderman of the London ward Bridge between 1574 and 1576, Tower between 1576 and 1583, Langbourn between 1583 and 1587, and Bassishaw between 1587 and 1593. Barne served as Auditor of London in 1574, Sheriff of London between 1576 and 1577, Lord Mayor of London between 1586 and 1587, and was knighted by Lord Chamberlain in 1587. He was a Master of the Haberdashers' Company between 1586 and 1587, represented London in the Parliament between 1588 and 1589, and was President of St. Thomas' Hospital between 1592 and 1593. Barne was also the Governor of the Muscovy Company several times, and a founder of the Spanish Company, in 1577, and the Turkey Company.

In 1580, he helped finance a voyage to discover a Northeast Passage, as his father had done decades previously. Barne supported the voyage of Edward Fenton in 1582 and John Davis' voyage in 1586, both of which sought to find the Northwest Passage.

He was related to several families of the London oligarchy, had shares in the Company of Mineral and Battery Works, and was well connected, considered one of the most influential people of his times in London municipal affairs. Sir Jerome Horsey wrote that Barne was his dear friend, and it is noted that Barne was a contemporary of Henry Hudson.

John Stow dedicated his work "The Chronicles of England" to Barne. It was during Barne's mayoralty, in February 1586/87, that the celebrated funeral procession of Sir Philip Sidney took place in London, and the Lord Mayor with his two Sheriffs and his Sword-bearer are shown riding on horseback in the 20th Plate of Thomas Lant's contemporary depiction.

Upon his death, Barne left a will which revealed his financial success, holding land and estates in several countries. He lived on Lombard Street, London and was buried at St Edmund, King and Martyr nearby.

== Anti-Catholicism ==
He was noted for his excessive zeal against Catholics when he was the sheriff, resulting in a breach of diplomatic etiquette when he stormed a private residence hosting the Portuguese ambassador for mass. As a result, he was imprisoned in the Fleet for a few days. It is noted that he was the brother-in-law of Queen Elizabeth I's Secretary of State, Sir Francis Walsingham, who was responsible for breaking up the Catholic plot to overthrow the Queen during the following decade.

== Marriage and issue ==
Barne married Anne Gerrard, daughter of Sir William Garrard, who was Lord Mayor of London in 1555. They had nine children:

- Sir William Barne, who married Anne, daughter of Dr. Edwin Sandys, Archbishop of York
- George Barne
- Francis Barne
- Thomas Barne
- John Barne
- Mark Barne
- Peter Barne
- Richard Barne, who in February 1619/20 married (as her second husband) Elizabeth Aungier of Great Tangley, Shalford, Surrey, daughter of Sir Francis Aungier, 1st Baron Aungier of Longford by his first wife, Douglas FitzGerald.
- Anne Barne, who married (1) by licence dated 17 July 1584, to Walter Marler, citizen and Salter of London, and (2) about 1602, (as his second wife) to Sir Francis Aungier, 1st Baron Aungier of Longford.
