= Robert Aunger =

14th-century English politician

Robert Aunger or Angre (fl. 1388–1397) of Bath, Somerset, was an English politician.

He was a member of the Parliament of England for Bath in January 1397 and Mayor of Bath in 1396.
