= John Southcote (died 1585) =

16th-century English politician and judge

Sir John Southcote (1510/11–1585) was an English judge and politician.

== Life ==
He was the second son of William Southcote and his wife Alice Tregonnell, and grandson of Nicholas Southcote of Chudleigh, Devon. He was a member of the Middle Temple, where he was autumn reader in 1556, and again on his call to the degree of serjeant-at-law, April 1559. In 1553 he sat in Parliament for Lewes, and then Steyning.

Southcote was appointed justice of the Queen's Bench on 10 February 1563. He sat alongside Chief Justice Sir Robert Catlin during the trial of Robert Hickford on 9 February 1572, a retainer of the Duke of Norfolk who was indicted for supporting the queen's enemies. He also served as assessor to the peers during the trial of Thomas Howard, 4th Duke of Norfolk. In addition, he participated in the November–December 1577 conference on the legal approach to handling recusants.

In May 1584 Southcote retired and was succeeded by John Clench. He died on 18 April 1585.

== Family ==
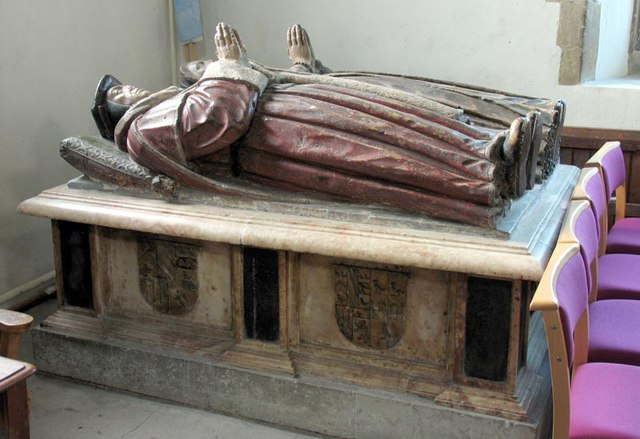
Tomb of John and Elizabeth Southcote in St Nicholas Church, Witham, Essex

With his wife Elizabeth, daughter of William Robins, alderman of London, Southcote had a son John and two daughters. His remains were interred in the church of Witham, Essex, near his seat.

While Southcote conformed to the Elizabethan settlement of the Church of England, his children were Catholic recusants. His son John is known to have attended mass. His daughter Martha married Francis Stonor (1551–1625), Member of Parliament for New Woodstock. His daughter Ann(e) married Francis Curson of Waterperry: she sheltered John Gerard in the periods 1589–1595 and 1597–1605.

A descendant, George Southcote of Blyborough, Lincolnshire, became Sir George Southcote, 1st Baronet on 1 January 1662. The baronetcy became extinct in 1691. A great-great-grandson of the judge, Sir Edward Southcote of Witham Place, wrote a family memoir that was published in the 19th century. His descent was via John (died 1637), son of the judge, who married Magdalen Walgrave; their son Edward who married Elizabeth Seaborne; their son Sir John who married Elizabeth, daughter of Walter Aston, 2nd Lord Aston of Forfar. He himself married Juliana Tyrwhitt, daughter of Sir Philip Tyrwhitt, 4th Baronet.

== Coat of arms ==
Coat of arms of Sir John Southcote
Crest A Coot sable. Helm of a Knight Escutcheon Quarterly of Five. -1. Argent, a chevron engrailed gules between three black coots sable. (Southcote) 2. Azure, a bend wavy between two bundles argent. (Keynes) 3. Argent, on a fess sable with three mullets or, between three markets sable. (Pury) 4. Azure, thee bird-bolts argent. (Bozome) 5. Argent, a lion rampant gules, a chief azure. (St. George)
