= Thomas Lodge (Lord Mayor of London) =

British politician

Sir Thomas Lodge
- Born: c. 1509
- Died: 28 February 1584 (aged 74–75)
- Buried: St Mary Aldermary
- Spouses: Mawdlyn (Magdalene) Vaughan; Margaret Parker; Anne Luddington
- Issue: Sara Lodge; Susan Lodge; William Lodge; Thomas Lodge; Nicholas Lodge; Benedict Lodge; Henry Lodge; Thomas Lodge; Joan Lodge; Anne Lodge
- Father: William Littleton alias Lodge

Sir Thomas Lodge (c. 1509 – 28 February 1584), was Lord Mayor of London.

== Family ==
Thomas Lodge was born around 1509 and was the son of William Littleton alias Lodge and born at Cound, Shropshire a manor owned by the Earls of Arundel from antiquity down to 1560.

His paternal grandfather was Sir William Littleton (d. 8 November 1507), knighted after the Battle of Stoke, eldest son and heir of Sir Thomas Littleton (d.1481), justice and author of Littleton's Tenures. According to Bernard:

Sir William Littleton (1450–1507) eldest son of the judge, had issue by his second marriage one son John, his heir, and one daughter Anne, the wife of Thomas Rouse of Ragley in Warwickshire. She was mother of the Lady Abbess of Ramsey. Sir William had likewise a natural son called William Littleton alias Lodge, afterwards of Cressage in Shropshire. He [i.e., Sir William] was the first of the family who bore the triton as a supporter. He sealed many deeds with the same crest as the judge, his father, and spelled his name Littleton. He lived in great splendor at Frankley till his death November the 8th 1508, and was interred in the great church of the abbey of Hales-Owen.

Sir William Littleton's legitimate son, John Littleton (c.1499 – 17 May 1532), married Elizabeth Talbot, one of the three daughters and coheirs of Sir Gilbert Talbot (d. 22 October 1542) of Grafton by Agnes Paston, by whom he had seven sons and two daughters, including his eldest son and heir, Sir John Littleton.

Sir William Littleton's illegitimate son, William Littleton alias Lodge, was the father of Sir Thomas Lodge.

== Early career and marriages ==
Thomas Lodge was apprenticed in March 1528 to the London Grocer William Pratt, of All Hallows, Honey Lane, and served for about ten years, gaining his freedom of the Worshipful Company of Grocers between 1537 and 1539. By his mother Emma (Bodley)'s second marriage, William Pratt became the stepson of Sir Christopher Askewe, Draper, Lord Mayor 1533–34, and alderman for Cheap ward 1534–39: and in the latter year both Askewe and Pratt died. Pratt, who left a widow Mawde and young children Christopher and Emma, refers to Stephen Vaughan as his brother.

Lodge's first marriage was to Mawdleyn, sister of Stephen Vaughan. Travelling much for mercantile purposes, in February 1545 he was acting for Vaughan in England and abroad in the surveillance of suspicious persons, and the delivery of secret letters to the Privy Council. His London residence was then in St Michael, Cornhill, which as churchwarden he rented from the parish: when Mawdleyn died in 1548 she was buried within that church. In 1549 Vaughan appointed his 'trustie friend' Thomas Lodge one of the two overseers of his will.

Pratt and Vaughan were of Reformist sympathy, and Lodge was with them. The reign of Edward VI advanced his expectations. He served as Warden of the Grocers' Company in 1548, in Sir William Laxton's sixth term as Master. Sir William and Lady Laxton were particularly remembered in Pratt's will, a connection no doubt favourable to Lodge's progress. He soon remarried to Margaret Parker, his former maidservant, and daughters were born to them in 1549 and 1551 before Margaret also died and was buried at St. Michael's in 1552. Therefore, upon the death of the wealthy Grocer William Lane in 1552 (whose first wife had been the sister of Peter Osborne), Lodge took to his third wife Lane's widow Anne, née Loddington, Laxton's elder stepdaughter, and became stepfather to her two sons and two daughters.

== Alderman and Sheriff ==
Lodge was among the Merchant Adventurers and Merchants of the Staple co-opted as signatories to the Letters Patent for the Limitation of the Crown on 21 June 1553. Following the proclamation of Queen Mary on 19 July, he was among the proposers of John Machell as alderman for the Vintry ward, made vacant by the transfer of William Hewett to Candlewick on 18 July, and Machell was sworn on 20 July. Three days later George Barne named Thomas Offley to be a Sheriff for the coming year, and Lodge, who was then in Flanders and not yet an alderman, was chosen by the Commons on 1 August to serve as Sheriff with him. The death of Stephen Kirton made way for Lodge's election as alderman to the Cheap ward on 23 August, but he was not sworn until 24 October, after the swearing of the Sheriffs at Michaelmas and the Coronation of Queen Mary on 1 October 1553. William Hewett therefore served as Sheriff with Offley for the year 1553–54.

Lodge became Master of the Grocers' Company for his first term in 1554–55.

Lodge engaged in foreign trade in Antwerp, and was an enterprising supporter of schemes for opening new markets in distant countries. On 25 November 1553 a sum of £15,426. 19s. 1d. sterling was paid to him and other merchants in consideration of money advanced to the Queen by them at Antwerp. In 1555 he was one of the 24 named Assistants to the Governor and Consuls in Queen Mary I's Charter to the Company of Merchant Adventurers to New Lands (Muscovy Company). He received Mary's thanks in a letter dated from Richmond 9 August 1558, for his willingness to become surety for redeeming Sir Henry Palmer, prisoner in France.

Lodge was principal mourner, and his brother-in-law John Machell (husband of Joan, Anne Lodge's sister) second mourner, at the funeral of William Laxton in August 1556, in the late summer of Machell's shrievalty, and both were overseers of Laxton's will. Lodge and Dame Joan Laxton were therefore involved in the making of Laxton's grave in the violated and dis-endowed Keble chantry in St Mary Aldermary, where both were later buried. Lodge and Dame Joan worked with the Grocers' Company for Laxton's will in the foundation of Oundle School, and Lodge continued to occupy under lease a house on the Cornhill, London which was among the school's endowments, into the 1570s.

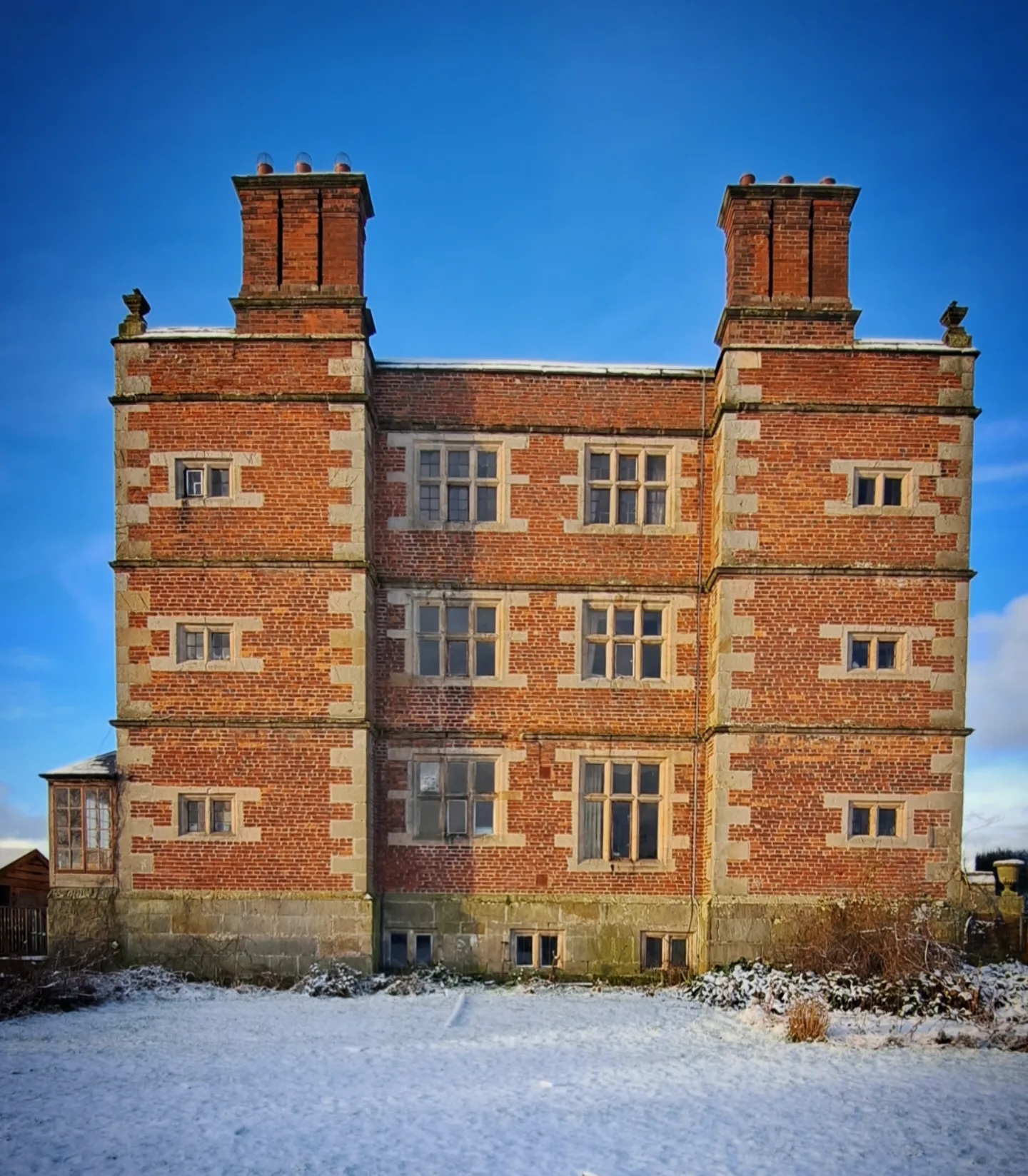
The manor of Soulton Hall, sold by Lodge to Sir Rowland Hill, publisher of the Geneva Bible, a possible inspiration for setting of Shakespeare's 'As You Like It' via Lodge's son Thomas. The hall building shown narrowly post-dates Lodge's ownership

Also in 1556 Lodge sold the manors of Hawkstone and Soulton, near Wem, to Sir Rowland Hill and Sir Thomas Leigh. There are indications that the Lodge family's familiarity with the manor and the statecraft of Sir Rowland Hill who published the Geneva Bible, were memorialized in Shakespeare's play As You Like It, itself inspired by Lodge's son Thomas Lodge's book Rosalynde.

In 1558 Lodge was among the principal overseers for John Machell's will, a duty which occupied him until at least 1568.

The death of Mary and accession of Elizabeth I made way for Lodge's election, with Roger Martyn, as Sheriff for 1559–60 in the Mayoralty of William Hewett. In 1559 he headed a commission to survey for the improvement of the river Lea for navigation and water supply between Ware and London (and was further consulted about his findings seven years later). In the same period he served his second term as Master of the Grocers' Company. In 1561 he was Governor of the Muscovy Company, and on 8 May in that capacity signed a 'remembrance' to Anthony Jenkinson on his departure to Russia and Persia. He also traded to Barbary, and on 14 August 1561 he offered, jointly with Sir William Chester and Sir William Garrard, to defray the charges of a Portuguese mariner for a voyage of discovery to that coast, and to present him with one hundred crowns.

== Lord Mayor (1562–63) ==
As his servant John Wanton was gathering military intelligence in Dieppe, Lodge entered office as Lord Mayor of London on 29 October 1562. Henry Machyn described his inauguration. He went by river to Westminster, with the aldermen and Crafts in barges decked with streamers: so to Westminster Old Palace, attended by drums, trumpets and guns, to take his oath: then he and all the aldermen returned to Baynard's Castle. He was met by the bachelors in St Paul's Churchyard, wearing their crimson damask hoods, with drums, flutes and trumpets blowing, with 60 poor men in blue gowns and red caps, and with targets, javelins, great standards, and four great banners of arms. A goodly pageant with music followed, after which a great dinner was held at the Guildhall, with many of the council, the judges, and noblemen and their wives. Then the mayor and aldermen proceeded to St Paul's, with much music. Lodge was knighted in 1562.

=== Mercantile ventures in Guinea ===
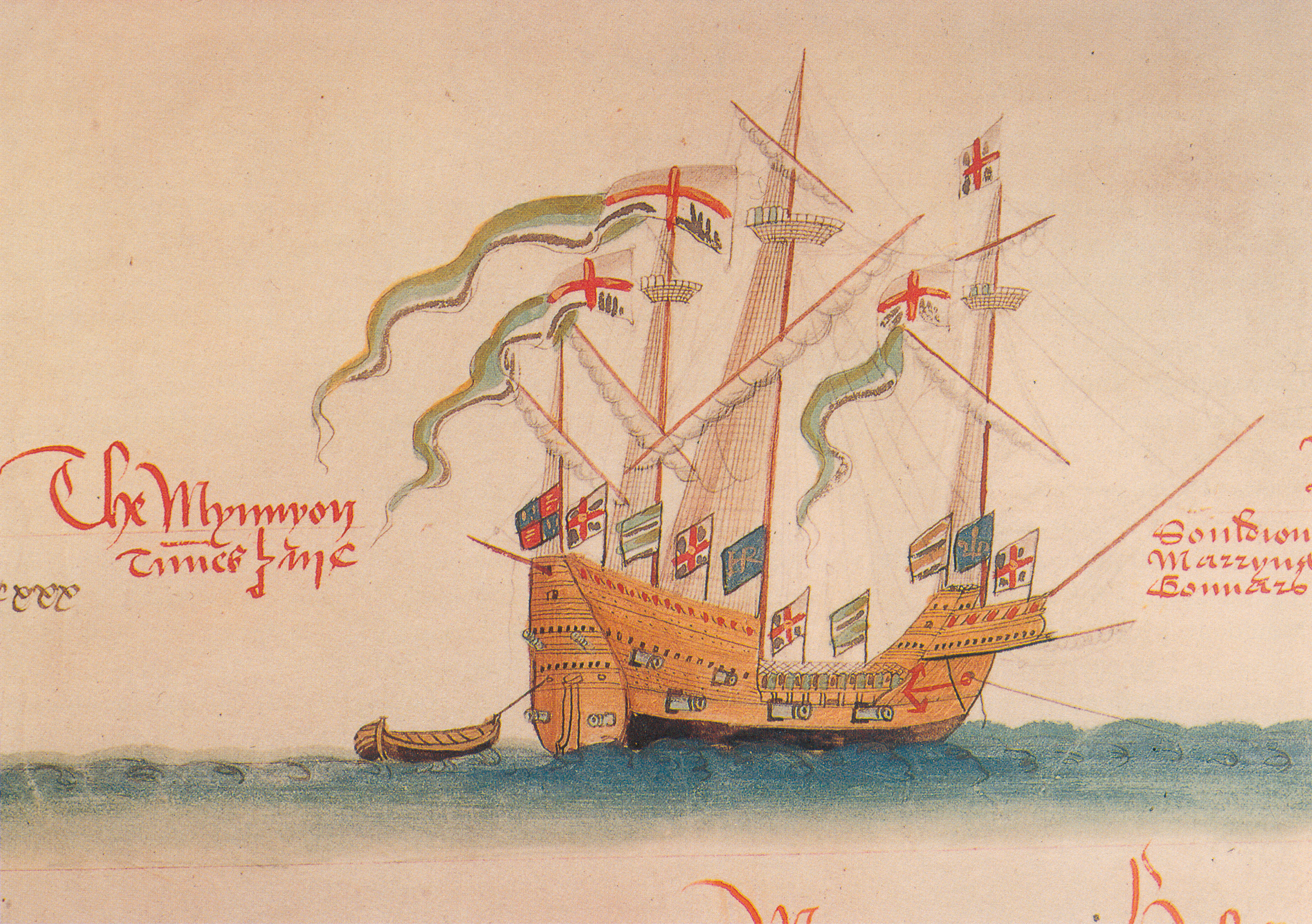
The carrack Minion (from the Anthony Roll)

During 1562 Lodge, with other citizens, executed an indenture of charter-party with the queen for two ships, the Minion and the Primrose, to 'sail and traffic in the ports of Africa and Ethiopia'. This has mistakenly been thought to represent the inauguration of the infamous traffic in slaves, countenanced by Elizabeth. That unenviable distinction belongs to the same year of 1562, to the initiative of Sir John Hawkins, and to a similar group of investors who furnished money to enable Hawkins to fit out three ships to trade in the capture of slaves in Guinea. Richard Hakluyt associated Sir Lionel Duckett, Sir Thomas Lodge, Benjamin Gonson (Hawkins's father-in-law), Sir William Winter and Mr Bromfield, 'his worshipfull friendes of London', with the funding venture.

Hawkins's first voyage for slave traffic to the West Indies set off with about 100 men in October 1562 in the Salomon, the Swallow and the Jonas. Having landed at Tenerife they made for Sierra Leone where they obtained a cargo of 300 Africans, and then proceeded across the ocean to Hispaniola, and other ports, where their traffic was eagerly taken up. So Hawkins returned to England 'with prosperous successe, and much gaine to himself and the aforesayde adventurers', in September 1563. The voyage of the Minion and the Primrose did not connect with this: William Rutter's account shows that they set out in February 1562 (civil year 1563) and after an eventful expedition, including violent altercations with the Portuguese, returned to England in August 1563 with 1578 lbs of ivory and 22 buts of graines (chillis), having lost 21 men. No mention is made of human traffic.

=== Home affairs ===
Lodge broke with tradition by being the first Lord Mayor to wear a beard. Although this was considered uncomely, he was outdone by his successor Sir John White, who wore a long flowing beard.

In Lodge's mayoralty London suffered a severe outbreak of plague. As illustration of his character, John Stow tells of a man Skeggs, formerly a Purveyor to Queen Mary, who was deprived of the freedom of the city for some fault but, on appeal, reinstated. During this plague he seized a number of capons provided for the Mayor's table, to supply them to Queen Elizabeth, but Lodge made him restore some of them. Skeggs complained to the Earl of Arundel, Lord Steward, and Sir Edward Rogers, Comptroller of the Household, that Lodge had threatened him with imprisonment for performing his duties: they wrote outrageously to Lodge, promising to chastise him for his misdemeanours and to teach him his duty. Lodge wrote prudently to his friends Lord Robert Dudley and William Cecil, Secretary of State, denying the truth of it, questioning what such hostility towards his office and its dignity might mean, and mildly doubting his own worthiness to occupy it if his word were less valued than that of a servant with a grudge.

Lodge is said to have brought Easterlings to England from the silver and copper mines in Germany, to reduce and refine 'the diversity of coins into a perfect standard.' Lodge further told Agarde that the men who 'fell sick to death with the savour' of the base coins in melting, found relief by drinking from human skulls, which he procured from London Bridge, under a warrant from the council.

Lodge's term as Mayor ended in scandal. His finances broke, and he was obliged to declare himself bankrupt. Either during the last months of his mayoralty, or more probably soon afterwards, he spent time in the Fleet Prison as a debtor, so that in December 1563 his debts were reckoned at around £5000. He was permitted to approach the Lords of the Council at Windsor, who made an appeal on his behalf (and in consideration of the unusual circumstances) to the Queen. Her Majesty agreed to permit a stay of his credit and that the Lords should advance him ready money of £6000 to supply his urgent need.

== Continuing investments ==
In November 1563, under the same sponsors (including Lodge), the Merlin and the John Baptist of London set off with Robert Baker as principal factor, as he had been with the Primrose and Minion. Their experiences were unhappy: after various encounters with the Portuguese and the African peoples, Baker and his surviving companions were captured and abandoned ashore, while the two ships returned separately to England. Baker himself was rescued by a French ship, which returned him to France as a prisoner. He gave notice of his plight by sending a versified account of the voyage as a message, and was so brought home.

Lodge was again among the adventurers who in July 1564 promoted a further Guinea expedition with the Minion, the Merlin and the John Baptist. This put out in October 1564, and coincided with the departure from Plymouth of Sir John Hawkins's second slaving voyage in Jesus of Lübeck, with the Salomon the Tiger and the Swallow. Soon after setting off they hit a storm in which the Merlin became separated from her companions, who by chance were met by Hawkins. The Minion went to find the Merlin, which was unluckily sunk by a powder explosion in the gunners' room. Hawkins accompanied the remaining two craft to Tenerife, and then parted from them to collect his human cargo at Cano Verde, Sierra Leone, and thence across the ocean to Burburoata. The Guinea expedition failed in April 1565.

Lodge had various investments in land estates and in his trading speculations, but through a series of suits or challenges to title or profits he was drawn into frequent, costly litigation and, being over-invested, constantly struggled to find ready money, and ran through his capital assets. In 1567-8 he was obliged to resign from the Aldermanry, and was again under arrest until 1570, when various suits or causes which had been deferred by declaration of bankruptcy were revived. His City friends and Companies made several efforts to relieve his circumstances, holding him to be a very trusted man and considerable trader, but his fortunes waned.

Dame Joan Laxton survived until 1576, and it may have been with her help that Sir Thomas Lodge was able to acquire the manor of Rolleston, Nottinghamshire, which descended to Lodge's heirs. It was vested in the family of Nevill of Holt (Medbourne, Leicestershire) until at least 1570, after which it was sold to Sir Thomas, and therefore was not a Kirkby hereditament by descent, as C. J. Sisson suggested.

== Death and legacy ==
Lodge died 28 February 1584, and was buried near his wife and parents-in-law in St Mary Aldermary Church. The stone memorial to Sir Henry Keble, Lord Mayor 1510 and Grocer, and a great benefactor to the rebuilding of that church, was laid over his vault by the testamentary instructions of his son-in-law William Blount, 4th Baron Mountjoy, who died in 1534. The tomb having been rifled and the chantry suppressed, the benefits of Keble's endowment were restored to the Company detached from their religious uses. William Laxton was buried in his vault in 1556 and Dame Joan Laxton in 1576, with a monument over them. Her daughter Dame Anne Lodge was buried there in 1579, and Sir Thomas Lodge beside her in 1584, and they had a small monument laid on the ground by the Laxton tomb, with this inscription:

"Here lieth buried Sir Thomas Lodge, knight, and Dame Anne his wife. Hee was L. Maior in the yeere of oure Lord God 1563, when God did visit this Citie with a great plague for our sinnes. For we are sure that our Redeemer liveth, and that we shall rise out of the Earth in the latter day, &c., Job. 19."

=== Lodge's will ===
Lodge's will, dated 14 Dec 1583, was proved on 7 June 1585, and administered by Gamaliel Woodford as executor. He described himself as of West Ham in Essex (purchased by Lady Laxton from John Quarles, Draper, and by her bequeathed to Anne and Thomas Lodge in 1579), and left £5 to the poor there. He provided for a funeral sermon to be preached in St Peter's, Cornhill, and for six other sermons to be preached in that church and the church of St Mary Aldermary. The principal bequests were to his three sons Nicholas, Benedick and Henry, and to the family of his daughter Joan Woodford. No mention is made of his son Thomas, but he leaves a bequest to his godson, Thomas Lodge, the son of his son William: William himself is made an overseer but not an executor of the will.

The difficulties over his son Thomas Lodge the poet are expressed more at length in the will (proved 26 January 1579/80) of his third wife Lady Anne Lodge, in whose right (by her mother's bequest) she and Sir Thomas held the manor of Malmeynes in Barking and Dagenham, Essex. Her will written 15 September 1579 at first enjoins her son William as executor (who is to enter a bond for assurance) to convey these lands to Thomas her second son, under the approval of Sir William Cordell, Master of the Rolls, pending their use by Sir Thomas her husband during his own lifetime.

However two days after that ensealing, now affirming several times the assent and commandment of the said Sir Thomas Lodge, by Codicil this devise is revoked and granted instead to William. In its place, she and Sir Thomas 'myndinge yet the advauncement of my second sonne to some convenient porcion of lyvinge', the free chapel of Nayland with its advowson, the capital messuage called Bakers in Stoke-by-Nayland, with their lands (both Suffolk) and all their lands in 'Great Horsley' (Essex), (much of which had also descended to Lady Anne through her mother and stepfather Sir William and Lady Laxton), is to be devised and assured to the son Thomas under the same conditions as the former devise. This provision, leaving a significant degree of control during his lifetime to Sir Thomas, therefore stood in place of any separate provision for Thomas within Sir Thomas's own will.

At the time of his father's death Thomas Lodge possessed such debts, or had received such advances of money, as obliged him to free his brother William of all claims on his legacies, though in subsequent years he brought suit against William for having procured this deed of release from him unfairly in the time of his need.

== Marriages and children ==
Lodge first married Mawdleyn, sister of Stephen Vaughan. She died in 1548 and was buried at St Michael, Cornhill.

Lodge's second wife was Margaret Parker of Wrottisley, Staffordshire, by whom he had two daughters:

- Sara Lodge (christened 1549) became the wife of the printer Edward White.
- Susan Lodge (christened 1551) married Thomas Leicester of Worleston in Cheshire.

Lodge's second wife, Margaret, died and was buried in April 1552 at St Michael, Cornhill.

Lodge's third wife was Anne Luddington (1523–1579), daughter of the London grocer Henry Luddington by Joan Kirkeby (d.1576), daughter and heir of William Kirkeby of London. After Henry Luddington's death in 1531, his widow remarried before 1539 to William Laxton (Lord Mayor of London in 1545). Laxton had no issue of his own, and bequeathed his estate to the use of his widow, and after her death to his niece Joan Wanton, his right heir, and to his three step-children by Joan's first marriage, Nicholas Luddington, Joan (Machell) and Anne (Lodge).

Anne Luddington was the widow of the wealthy London Grocer William Lane (d.1552). Lodge's stepchildren by Anne were:

- Luke Lane
- Gabriel Lane
- Anne Lane
- Elizabeth Lane
- It's debatable that these were the children of Anne Luddington, as they are not mentioned in her Will, her stepfather's will or her mother's will.

Thomas and Anne Lodge had six sons and two daughters of their own:

- William Lodge, eldest son and heir, baptized on 8 July 1554, who on 14 October 1577 married Mary Blagrave, the daughter of Thomas Blagrave, Master of the Revels.
- Thomas Lodge (baptized 23 May 1556, buried 4 June 1556), second son.
- Nicholas Lodge (born before 1562), who became a ward of his brother-in-law, Gamaliel Woodford.
- Benedict Lodge (baptized 18 April 1563), who became a ward of Richard Culverwell.
- Henry Lodge (baptized 14 April 1566 at St Peter's Cornhill, who became a ward of Thomas Waterhouse.
- Thomas Lodge (1558–1625), physician and playwright.
- Joan Lodge (born 1555), who was the god-daughter of Anthony Hussey, and married, on 30 March 1573, Gamaliel Woodford, grocer and Merchant of the Staple, by whom she had a son, Thomas Woodford (born 13 January 1578), who held the lease of the Whitefriars Theatre with Michael Drayton.
- Anne Lodge (born 1558–1562, buried 19 December 1573).

Dame Anne Lodge, to whom Edward White dedicated in 1579 his Myrror of Modestie, died in 1579. An Epitaph of the Lady Anne Lodge, also published by White, is described in the Stationers' Register as by T. Lodge, but no copy is known: the attribution to Thomas Lodge is among the register annotations added by the forger John Payne Collier, who began his study of them in 1847.

== Sources ==
- Alsop, J.D. (2004). "Laxton, Sir William (d. 1556)". Oxford Dictionary of National Biography (online ed.). Oxford University Press. doi:10.1093/ref:odnb/16214. (Subscription, Wikipedia Library access or UK public library membership required.) (subscription required)
- Baker, J.H. (2004). "Littleton, Sir Thomas (d. 1481)". Oxford Dictionary of National Biography (online ed.). Oxford University Press. doi:10.1093/ref:odnb/16787. (Subscription, Wikipedia Library access or UK public library membership required.) (subscription required)
- Bernard, John Peter; Birch, Thomas (1738). A General Dictionary Historical and Critical. Vol. III. p. 118.
- Clifford, Thomas and Arthur Clifford (1817). A Topographical and Historical Description of the Parish of Tixall in the County of Stafford. pp. 144–5.
- Collier, John Payne, ed. (1843). A Defence of Poetry, Music, and Stage-Plays, by Thomas Lodge of Lincoln's Inn. London: Shakespeare Society.
- Grazebrook, George and John Paul Rylands, eds. (1889). The Visitation of Shropshire Taken in the Year 1623, Part II. Vol. XXIX. London: Harleian Society. pp. 284–5.
- Halasz, Alexandra (2004). "Lodge, Thomas (1558–1625)". Oxford Dictionary of National Biography (online ed.). Oxford University Press. doi:10.1093/ref:odnb/16923. (Subscription, Wikipedia Library access or UK public library membership required.) (subscription required)
- McConnell, Anita (2004). "Lodge, Sir Thomas (1509/10–1585)". Oxford Dictionary of National Biography (online ed.). Oxford University Press. doi:10.1093/ref:odnb/16922. (Subscription, Wikipedia Library access or UK public library membership required.) (subscription required)
- Phillimore, W.P.W., ed. (1888). The Visitation of the County of Worcester Made in the Year 1569. Vol. XXVII. London: Harleian Society. p. 113.
- Richardson, Douglas (2011). Magna Carta Ancestry: A Study in Colonial and Medieval Families, ed. Kimball G. Everingham. Vol. III (2nd ed.). Salt Lake City. pp. 462–3. ISBN 144996639X
- Sisson, Charles J. (1931). Thomas Lodge and Other Elizabethans. New York: Octagon Books Inc. pp. 1–164.

Attribution

This article incorporates text from a publication now in the public domain: "Lodge, Thomas (d.1584)". Dictionary of National Biography. London: Smith, Elder & Co. 1885–1900.
