= Leonard Wright =

Leonard Wright (b.1555/6 fl. 1591), was a controversialist who wrote many essays on religious and moral subjects which abound in scriptural references. He came into prominence as a champion of the cause of the bishops in the Martin Marprelate controversy, and was denounced by those who attacked episcopacy. The anti-episcopal author of ‘Theses Martinianæ’ (1590) anathematised him and six other ‘haggling and profane’ writers, and described them as ‘serving the established church if for no other use but to worke its ruine, and to bewray their owne shame and miserable ignorance’ (sig. B. iii, v.) [cf. art. Kemp, William].

== Works ==
Wright published:

1. A Summons for Sleepers. Wherein most grieuous and notorious offenders are cited to bring forth true frutes of repentance, before the day of the Lord now at hand. Hereunto is annexed, A Patterne for Pastors, deciphering briefly the dueties pertaining to that function, by Leonard Wright. This was licensed for the press to John Wolfe on 4 March 1588–9, and was first published early in 1589. An edition ‘newly reprinted, corrected and amended’ bears the same date (black letter, 4to). A copy is in the British Museum. Neither place nor printer's name is given. Other editions are dated 1596 (‘imprinted by Adam Islip, and are to bee sold by Edward White;’ in the British Museum copy an engraving of the Seven Sleepers, dated 1740, is prefixed), 1615 (‘imprinted by George Purslowe’), and 1617 (‘newle corrected and augmented’).
2. A Display of Dutie, dect with sage sayings, pythie sentences, and proper similies: Pleasant to read, delightful to heare, and profitable to practise, by L. Wright, London (printed by John Wolfe, 1589, 4to; black letter). This work, which was licensed on 13 Oct. 1589, was dedicated ‘to the Right worshipfull, most valiant, and famous Thomas Candish, Esquier.’ Other editions are dated 1602 (‘printed by V[alentine] S[ims] for Nicholas Lyng’) and 1614 (‘printed by Edward Griffin for George Purslowe’). The volume contains a poem of some merit (‘In Prayse of Friendship’).
3. The Hunting of Antichrist, With a caueat to the contentious. By Leonard Wright, London (imprinted by John Wolfe, 1589; black letter, 4to). There is a sub-title at beginning of text, running ‘A briefe description of the Church of Rome from the time of Antichrist untill our present age’ (Brit. Mus.). Reference is made in the preface to Wright's ‘Summons to Sleepers.’ The work advocates the cause of prelacy.
4. A friendly admonition to Martine Marprelate and his Mates, by Leonard Wright, London, 1590, 4to.
5. The Pilgrimage to Paradise, by Leonard Wright (London, by John Wolfe), 1591, 4to. No copy of either 4 or 5 is in the British Museum.
