= Peter Osborne (Keeper of the Privy Purse) =

English civil servant (1521–1592)

Peter Osborne, Esquire, (1521–1592) was an English officer of state who was Keeper of the Privy Purse to King Edward VI, at a time when great constitutional changes affected the management of public finance. Of reformist sympathies in religion, his career was in abeyance during the reign of Queen Mary but regained momentum as Remembrancer in the Exchequer under Elizabeth, working usually to his marital kinsman Lord Burghley. He also sat in seven parliaments between 1559 and 1589.

== Life ==
=== Origins and young life ===
Peter Osborne was born the second son of Sir Richard Osborne, citizen and Grocer of London (died 1544), and his wife Elizabeth (née Coke), of Tyle or Tyled Hall, Latchingdon, Essex. The family had been seated at Purleigh, just north-west of Latchingdon, since at least the first half of the fifteenth century: Richard's grandfather, Peter Osborne of Purleigh, died in 1442; his son Richard Osborne died in 1471; Richard Osborne, of Tyld Hall, father of the Remembrancer, died in 1544.

Peter's elder brother was John Osborne, Gentleman, who had 3 sons and 3 daughters including Elizabeth, who married first Richard Bettenson of London, and secondly Archer Breame, of Halstead, Essex. Peter Osborne also had two sisters. One (Anne) married first to Edward Bowland of Margaretting, Essex (who died in 1546), and secondly, in July 1547, to Edward Saxilby (or Saxby), who was first appointed Baron of the Exchequer in 1549. Saxilby had been admitted to the Inner Temple in 1537 at the instance of his brother-in-law Thomas Walshe, Baron of the Exchequer. Osborne's other sister married to the wealthy London citizen and Grocer William Lane. After her death Lane remarried to Anne Luddington, stepdaughter of Sir William Laxton (Lord Mayor in 1545), and Osborne retained a trusted position in relation to Anne's family. At Lane's death in 1552 Osborne owed him some £230 which Lane made into a legacy for the children of his second marriage, appointing Osborne an overseer to his will on condition that he pay what was owed.

Osborne matriculated a pensioner from King's College, Cambridge (according to Fuidge not so late as 1548, as Venn states) but apparently did not graduate. He entered Lincoln's Inn in 1543 but was not called to the bar. His particular friend and bedfellow there, Henry Marwood of Halberton, died of a sickness in the summer or autumn of 1547. His friendship with John Cheke, Regius Professor of Greek at the University of Cambridge, was already formed (presumably at Cambridge), for in May 1549, when in danger of losing his position as preceptor to King Edward, Cheke wrote to Osborne in terms of trust and confidence. At about this time Osborne was in correspondence with Dr John Dee, advising him of Cheke's favour towards him and introducing Dee to the circle of William Cecil.

=== Edwardian Privy Purse ===
Osborne received a permanent appointment as Clerk of the Faculties in July 1551, an office established by the act 28 Hen. 8. c. 19. Around midwinter 1551/52 he acted as Keeper of the Privy Purse to King Edward VI and in 1552–53 held the office of Remembrancer to the Lord-Treasurer in the Exchequer, under the Lord Treasurer William Paulet, 1st Marquess of Winchester. It was under this designation that his role in relation to the Exchequer continued to the end of his life, although interrupted or subordinated between 1553 and 1559 through the reign of Queen Mary. John Cheke received a grant of appointment for life as a Chamberlain of the Receipt of the King's Exchequer in September 1552.

The changing administration of public finance during the reign of Edward VI and the Protectorate of the Duke of Northumberland defined Osborne's role. From January 1552 to May 1553 some £40,000 was directed into the king's privy coffers from the treasurers of the revenue courts to enable the Duke to manage fortifications, costs, loans and royal expenses. Osborne, as clerk to the four principal Gentlemen of the Privy Chamber, received funds from Parliamentary relief which were diverted directly from the courts, so that his office became "a clearing house or agency for the administration of public finance", under the direction of the Privy Council.

Osborne's mother Elizabeth died in 1553 making Peter her sole executor: since the death of Richard Osborne in 1544 her daughter Anne has remarried to Edward Saxilby, Baron of the Exchequer 1549, reappointed 1553 and 1560. Anne (the sister) dying, Saxilby afterwards married Elizabeth (Fisher), widow of William Woodliffe (died 1548), citizen and mercer of London. Peter's brother John also died in 1553, making Peter his executor in a will which bequeathed the estate of Tyled Hall to John's widow Jane for life, and to John's sons, probably the children of John's first wife, Dionysia.

=== Under Marian rule ===
Osborne's instrumentality in Northumberland's processes of Reform, and his near association with figures such as John Cheke and Thomas Wroth who, with the accession of Queen Mary, soon went into exile abroad, made him unserviceable to the continuing duties of Lord Winchester, who maintained his own office. However it does not appear that Osborne himself was driven into exile. Suggestions that he may have been imprisoned during Mary's reign remain unconfirmed.

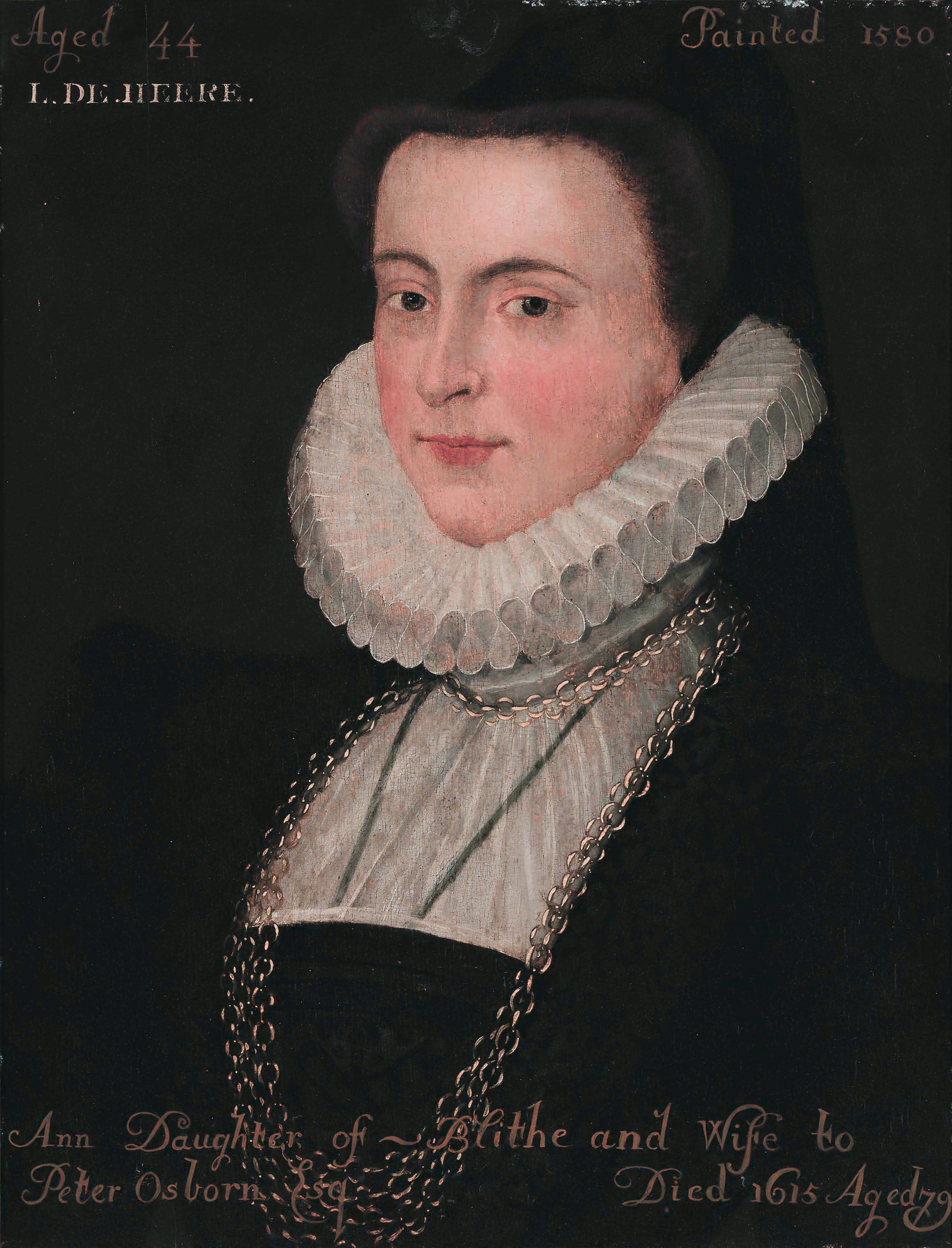
Anne Osborne, née Blythe (1536–1615)

By 1552 Peter Osborne was married to Anne, daughter of Dr John Blythe, the first Cambridge Regius Professor of Physic: her mother was Alice Cheke, John Cheke's sister. Anne's aunt Mary Cheke was the first wife of William Cecil (married 1541). These relations were naturally advantageous to Peter Osborne. Peter and Anne (who died in 1615) had 11 sons and 11 daughters of their own. Their son and heir John Osborne Esq. was born c. 1554, being aged 38 in June 1592.

After Sir John Cheke was forced to a recantation of his beliefs in 1557, he and Osborne were jointly granted manors at Brampton Abbotts (Herefordshire), Freshford, Cranmore (Somerset) and elsewhere (formerly possessions of the attainted Dukes of Somerset and Northumberland), to the uses of Cheke and his heirs, in respect of lands or titles which Cheke had surrendered to the crown. It was at the Osbornes' house in Wood Street, off Cheapside in the City of London, that Cheke died in the same year.

Osborne had been Cheke's intimate friend, was his testamentary overseer, and took charge of the education of Cheke's son Henry. As a result various important early manuscripts, perhaps originally from the library of John Leland, came into Osborne's hands (as John Bale reported), including John Brompton's Chronicon and William of Malmesbury's Gesta Pontificum Anglorum. Osborne later assisted Matthew Parker in the exchange of manuscript chronicles.

=== Osborne the Elizabethan ===
Sir Nicholas Throckmorton wrote to Queen Elizabeth on 18 November 1558 mentioning Osborne's readiness to serve her Majesty faithfully. From 1559 he was reinstated as the Lord Treasurer's Remembrancer in the Exchequer, and in February 1560 gave account of £43,700 received from the Exchequer and delivered to Thomas Gresham for the Queen's purposes in Flanders. In 1560 Osborne was involved with Sir Thomas Lodge, William Cecil, William Hewett and others in Elizabeth's commission for the refinement of base silver coinage, and employed Burchard, a German, for this work. He undertook to refine 18 hundredweight of base money at less cost than the German refiners at the Tower. On 3 January 1560/61 he was granted the manor of South Fambridge in Essex, on the south bank of the navigable river Crouch. At an early stage he was involved in negotiations towards the formation of the Society of Mines Royal. These discussions failed, but under licensed German enterprise mines in Cumberland, Lancashire, Cornwall and Devon developed during the 1560s leading to the Company's incorporation in 1568.

During 1561 Osborne exhausted himself on behalf of Sir Thomas Chamberlaine, in attempting to obtain payment of his expenses as diplomat in Spain. Thomas Lodge (formerly married to Mawdleyn, sister of Stephen Vaughan) had remarried to Anne Luddington, the widow of William Lane: Osborne did not fail in his trust towards her children, binding Gabriel Lane apprentice in June 1562 and sending him to school in the country in November. Osborne's continuing connection with her family is shown by his mention in the wills of Alderman John Machell (husband of Anne's sister Joan) in 1558, of their mother Dame Joan Laxton in 1576, of Anne herself in 1579 (Osborne and Lodge being her overseers), and of Sir Thomas Chamberlaine of Prestbury, Gloucestershire the second husband of Joan Machell, in 1580.

Edward Saxilby died in 1561, appointing Osborne overseer of his will and left him "all the bookes and writinges in a black buckeram bagg hanging uppon the walle behinde my Studdie". He also refers to the Marwood connection, leaving to "my Cosen Harry Marwood and his fellowes, Clarkes of the Queenes Remembrance Office in thexchequer and their successors the great boke of serche which was made for the contencyon between Thomas Walshe and Sir John Smythe, late Remembrancer in thexchequire." This Harry Marwood was the son of Saxilby's "sister" Elizabeth Fortescue, widow.

In Osborne's role as financial adviser to the government, and implementing the reformist agenda of free trade, many of his letters to Lord Burghley survive, not least among the British State papers, the Cecil papers at Hatfield House, and the Lansdowne manuscripts, concerning exchange, commercial transportation, brokerage and customs. In 1566 he for some months invested in the development of the salt-refining industry on the river Tyne, but withdrew from it, and in 1571 recommended to Lord Burghley the operations of the Flemish refugee Francis Franckard. In that year his eldest son John Osborne became Auditor of the Exchequer.

In 1572, as Lord Burghley succeeded Lord Winchester as Lord Treasurer, Osborne wrote of his intention to forward to him an account of trade and merchandise from King Henry III down to his own times. He planned to publish a "Collection of all the Statutes, Letters Patent, Charters and Privileges subsequent to the Third of Henry III", but this did not appear. His work as an author or compiler is recognized in his treatise entitled A short compendium or brief declaration of what every officer of his majesties Court of Exchequer ought to doe by vertue of his office in England. Osborne was a colleague of Thomas Fanshawe (1533–1601): his treatise was afterwards (in 1658) published with an attribution to Fanshawe.

Osborne was MP for Tregony in 1559 and for Horsham, Sussex in 1562–3. In 1562 he sat with Walter Haddon, Thomas Smith, Anthony Cooke and others, on the commission to seek out vagrancy and heresy. He was made an associate bencher of Lincoln's Inn in 1566: in a lampoon of that year, he was called "Oseborne the Devysor". In 1570 he was included in the special commission of oyer and terminer against John Felton, and was a commissioner for the interrogation of John Story in 1571. He was similarly among those recommended to participate in disputation with Edmund Campion in 1581. He was MP for Guildford in 1571, Plympton, Devon in 1572, Aldeburgh, Suffolk in 1584 and 1586 and Westminster in 1589.

=== Homage and trust ===
In 1567 Sir Thomas Wroth, who had been Gentleman to Edward VI and companion in exile of Sir John Cheke, made Osborne a Trustee (together with his Wroth and Rich relations) for the devise of Petherton Park, a role confirmed when he made Osborne an executor of his will in 1573, with personal custody of a strong chest to contain the accruing revenues for the performance of the will. Osborne and his co-executors were obliged to pursue the arrears of an annuity owing to Wroth since the time of King Edward. Dr. Walter Haddon, a friend of Osborne's, made bequests to Peter and Anne Osborne in his will proved in 1571, having made Osborne a Trustee for the devise of his manor of Hatcham Barnes in Surrey and Kent. In 1575 Archbishop Matthew Parker named him first among the executors of his will: he refers to him as "Magister Petrus Osborn de scaccario Dominae Reginae, Armiger", showing that Osborne bore arms. The (later) Osborne baronetcy of Chicksands bore Argent a bend between two lions sable, and the quartering for Osborne in the arms of Tuthill (representing the marriage of Peter's daughter Susan) is shown by the same arms, the bend being ermine, in the 1634 Essex Visitation.

In 1568 John Bernard's Oratio pia, religiosa, et solatii plena, de vera animi tranquillitate was published with a dedication by Thomas Bernard to Peter Osborne; Abraham Fleming's first English verse translation of Virgil's Bucolics, published 1575, was also dedicated to him. The physician of St Bartholomew-the-Less, Timothie Bright, published his Treatise of Melancholy (the forerunner of Robert Burton's more famous work) with a dedication to Osborne in 1586. He wrote, "This my slender endeuour I dedicate to your name right worshipfull M. Osbourne, to whom besides I am particularly beholdinge, your good fauouringe of vertue and learning in certaine of my acquaintance of the best marke hath moued me to geue this signification howe readie learning is to honor her fauorers: she hath many daughters, and they be all knit in loue." (sic) The copy of Bright's Characterie (his system of shorthand published in 1588) now in the Bodleian Library was Osborne's, and has his autograph on the title page.

Osborne is remembered as "brother-in-law" by John Pynchon of Writtle, Essex, in his will of 1573, and as "the Right Worshipful her loving brother Mr Osborne of the Exchequer" by Pynchon's widow Jane in her will proved in 1588. Jane had, meanwhile, remarried in 1576 to Principal Secretary Thomas Wilson (distinguished former student of John Cheke's circle, and near-contemporary of Osborne's at King's College), who died in 1581. Jane the wife of Pynchon and Wilson (and grandmother of William Pynchon of Springfield, Massachusetts) is identified as the daughter of Sir Richard Empson in the 1634 Visitation of Essex. The relationship appears to mean that Jane Empson had been the second wife of Peter Osborne's brother John, before marrying John Pynchon. Both Pynchon and Edward Saxilby had interests in the manor of Roxwell in Essex.

In 1570 Osborne was assistant governor of Lincoln's Inn. Between 1571 and 1574 he was nominated with Thomas Aldersey to make an impartial investigation of the Customs Books, and of all other evidences on both parts, in relation to the accusations against William Byrde, Comptroller of the Petty Customs of the Port of London, that he had concealed customs. After a scrupulous inquiry Byrde was exonerated. In 1576 Osborne was, with Thomas Gresham, one of the Queen's Commissioners concerning the Exchanges. In another capacity, in 1586 Osborne volunteered his mediation in a dispute between Richard Mulcaster, the retiring schoolmaster of the Merchant Taylors' School in St Laurence Pountney, and the Master and Wardens of the Company, concerning a settlement of payments, in which the authority of Osborne's judgement was invoked and accepted.

Osborne acquired the manor of Chicksands, a former property of Chicksands Priory, in Bedfordshire, from Daniel Snow, who went to Jerusalem leaving his will in Osborne's charge. In 1578 Daniel's brother Edward laid suit against Osborne to reclaim it, and in 1587 Edward and his wife conveyed the manor to Osborne and his son John: John Osborne, who inherited at his father's death, was the first of the family to inhabit it. The family was long associated with this village and the parish of Campton cum Shefford. In 1587 Henry Cheke died, aged 29, leaving his five children under Osborne's guardianship as "their careful friend and kinsman".

=== Last years ===
With Sir Henry Billingsley and Edward Fenton, in 1588 Osborne was charged by Burghley and Walsingham with the control and audit of the financial accounts of the expedition of Sir Francis Drake and Sir John Norreys against the Spanish in 1589. Osborne continued his work for the Exchequer until his death: he wrote to Lord Burghley in December 1591 urging the continued export of coal. A final decree in Chancery in the case begun in 1588 by Cornelius Avenant against Peter Osborne and Sir Rowland Hayward, as governors of the Company of Mineral and Battery Works, concerning shares in the wireworks at Tintern and other ironworks in Monmouthshire, Derbyshire, and at Isleworth, Middlesex, was not delivered until June 1593. In 1588 also, Osborne, with Ralph Rokeby and Thomas Fanshawe, formed a Commission to approve the construction of four water-wheels beneath a mill-house bridging three sterlings or jettees above London Bridge at its south end, for improving the supply of corn meal in the City: the project was implemented.

In 1588 Osborne prepared a settlement of his family estates, appointing as his trustees the scholar-preacher Hugh Broughton; William Fowler of Harnage Grange, near Cound, or Cressage, Shropshire, and his son and heir Richard Fowler (descendants of Chancellor Sir Richard Fowler); Francis Blythe Esquire; Ambrose Rous (of St Dominick, Cornwall), Esquire (Osborne's son-in-law); and John Astell, of Grays Inn, Gent. By this indenture the manors of South Fambridge and of Latchingdon (or Purleigh) Barnes, and the White Hart in West Cheap, were placed in feoffment to the uses of Peter and Anne Osborne and their children. This was modified in 1590 at the time of his son Christopher's marriage to Joan Moseley. Osborne addressed Hugh Broughton's application in 1590 to Lord Burghley for the Queen's warrant to visit foreign libraries.

=== Death and epitaph ===
Peter Osborne died on 7 June 1592 and was buried at St Faith under St Paul's, where a memorial inscription was set up. No will is known, but his inquisition post mortem was held at the London Guildhall on 6 April 1597. His memorial, which was destroyed in the Great Fire of London, ran:

Petrus Osburne, Armiger, Rememorator Thezaurarii Scaccarii; vir probus et prudens, obiit 7. die Junii anno domini. 1592. Cui 5. Februarii 1615. accessit vidua ejus, Anna, lectissima foemina, ex eodem Petro mater 22. liberorum.

Fœlices cineres, animas quibus incolas Sanctus,
Reddet in occursum, venientis in Æthere Christi.

(Peter Osborne, Armiger, Remembrancer of the Treasury's Exchequer; a man of integrity and prudence, he died on the 7th day of June AD 1592. On 5 February 1615 he was joined by his wife Anna, a most excellent woman, mother by the same Peter of 22 children.

O happy dust, to whom the Spirit may restore
Their souls, to meet Christ coming in the clouds.)

== Family ==
Peter Osborne, Esquire, married Anne, daughter of Dr. John Blythe and his wife Alice Cheke (sister of Sir John Cheke). They had eleven sons and eleven daughters. Of these

- (Sir) John Osborne (c.1554-1628) was the eldest son and heir. He studied at Eton College and King's College, Cambridge, and succeeded his father as Remembrancer of the Exchequer. The joint purchaser and inheritor of Chicksands, he was buried at Campton church, Bedfordshire. He sat as M.P. between 1572 and 1601. He married (in 1580) Dorothy, daughter and coheiress of Richard Barlee of Easingham Hall, Essex, Lady of the Privy Chamber to Anne of Denmark, Queen of King James VI and I. They had five sons and one daughter. Two notable sons were:
  - (Sir) Peter Osborne (1584–1653) (the eldest) was Royal Governor of Guernsey during the Civil War. It was for his son, Sir John Osborne (c. 1615–1699), that the Osborne baronetcy of Chicksands was created in 1662. Sir Peter's daughter was the littératrice Dorothy Osborne.
  - Francis Osborne (1593–1659) (the youngest), author of Advice to a Son (published 1656 and 1658).
- Christopher Osborne (c. 1557–1600), the second son, studied at Eton College and King's College, Cambridge. He was MP for Helston, Cornwall, in 1588–89. He married c. 1590 to Joan, daughter of Humphrey Moseley of London, Esquire, M.P., and died 17 April 1600 leaving a son and heir John Osborne aged 7 years and 3 months (born January 1592/93). At his death he refers to 7 living sisters.
- Henry Osborne (born c. 1558), the third son, studied at Eton College and King's College, Cambridge. He held a post in the Exchequer. He was of Forthampton, Gloucestershire, and his will is dated 1643. (living 1588)
- Nicholas Osborne (born c. 1558), studied at Eton College and King's College, Cambridge. Left the University in 1577. Not mentioned in the settlement of 1588.
- Richard Osborne, the fourth son (living 1588: died without heir). A citizen and Haberdasher, and Merchant Adventurer, he made his will in March 1591/92 on making a voyage into Germany, and it was proved in November 1592.
- Thomas Osborne, the fifth son (living 1588: died at London without heir before 17 April 1600.)
- Anne Osborne married (in 1583) Edmond Bell of Outwell, Norfolk (1562–1607), son of Sir Robert Bell (Speaker and Chief Baron of the Exchequer). They had five sons, after which Anne died and Edmond made two further marriages.
- Katherine Osborne (died 11 February 1615), married (by March 1594) Sir Thomas Cheke of Pyrgo in Essex (son of Henry Cheke and Frances, daughter of Sir Humphrey Radclyffe of Elstow, Bedfordshire: and grandson of Sir John Cheke). Sir Thomas afterwards married Essex Rich, daughter of Robert Rich, 1st Earl of Warwick.
- Maudlin Osborne married Ambrose Rous, son and heir of Sir Anthony Rous (1555–1620) of Halton, St Dominick, Cornwall. They had fifteen children.
- Elizabeth Osborne, married (by 1600) to (Sir) Edward Duncombe, Bart. of Battlesden, Bedfordshire (died 1637/38).
- (unnamed) Osborne, married (by 1600) to (unnamed) Smithe.
- Susan Osborne married William Tuthill of the Tuthill family of Saxlingham, Norfolk. They had (at least) four sons and two daughters.
- Dorothie Osborne (living 1600).

Descriptions of the portrait collection formerly at Chicksands Priory include reference to a portrait of the Elizabethan Peter Osborne. The portrait of King Edward VI now attributed to "Master John", 1547, was by report given to Peter Osborne and remained in his family until 1982, when it was purchased for the National Portrait Gallery, London, according to that institution's published record. It is probably the same which in the older accounts of the collection is attributed to Holbein.

Court offices
Preceded by ???	Keeper of the Privy Purse; 1551–1552	Succeeded by ???
