= John Peter Bernard =

John Peter Bernard (French: Jean-Pierre Bernard) (died 1750) was an Anglo-French biographer, elected a Fellow of the Royal Society for his work on the General Dictionary, Historical and Critical.

== Life ==
He was the son of James (Jacques) Bernard, a Huguenot minister known as a man of letters. He received his education at the University of Leyden, where he took degrees in arts and philosophy. In 1733 he was settled in London, and earning a livelihood by preaching, giving lessons in literature and mathematics, and compiling for the booksellers.

Bernard was admitted a Fellow of the Royal Society in January 1738. He died in the parish of St. Marylebone, on 6 April 1760.

== Works ==
Bernard is remembered for having made major contributions to the General Dictionary, Historical and Critical, 10 vols. London, 1734–41. His article contributions were marked with "P." at the end, comprising 63 articles on subjects not in Pierre Bayle's Dictionnaire Historique et Critique, on which the Dictionary was based. These names are listed by Osborn, and include Bayle himself, and Louis XIV. The other contributors with assigned signatures were Thomas Birch and John Lockman.

== Notes ==
Attribution

This article incorporates text from a publication now in the public domain: Stephen, Leslie, ed. (1885). "Bernard, John Peter". Dictionary of National Biography. Vol. 4. London: Smith, Elder & Co.
