= William Hewett (Lord Mayor) =

Lord Mayor of London

Sir William Hewett
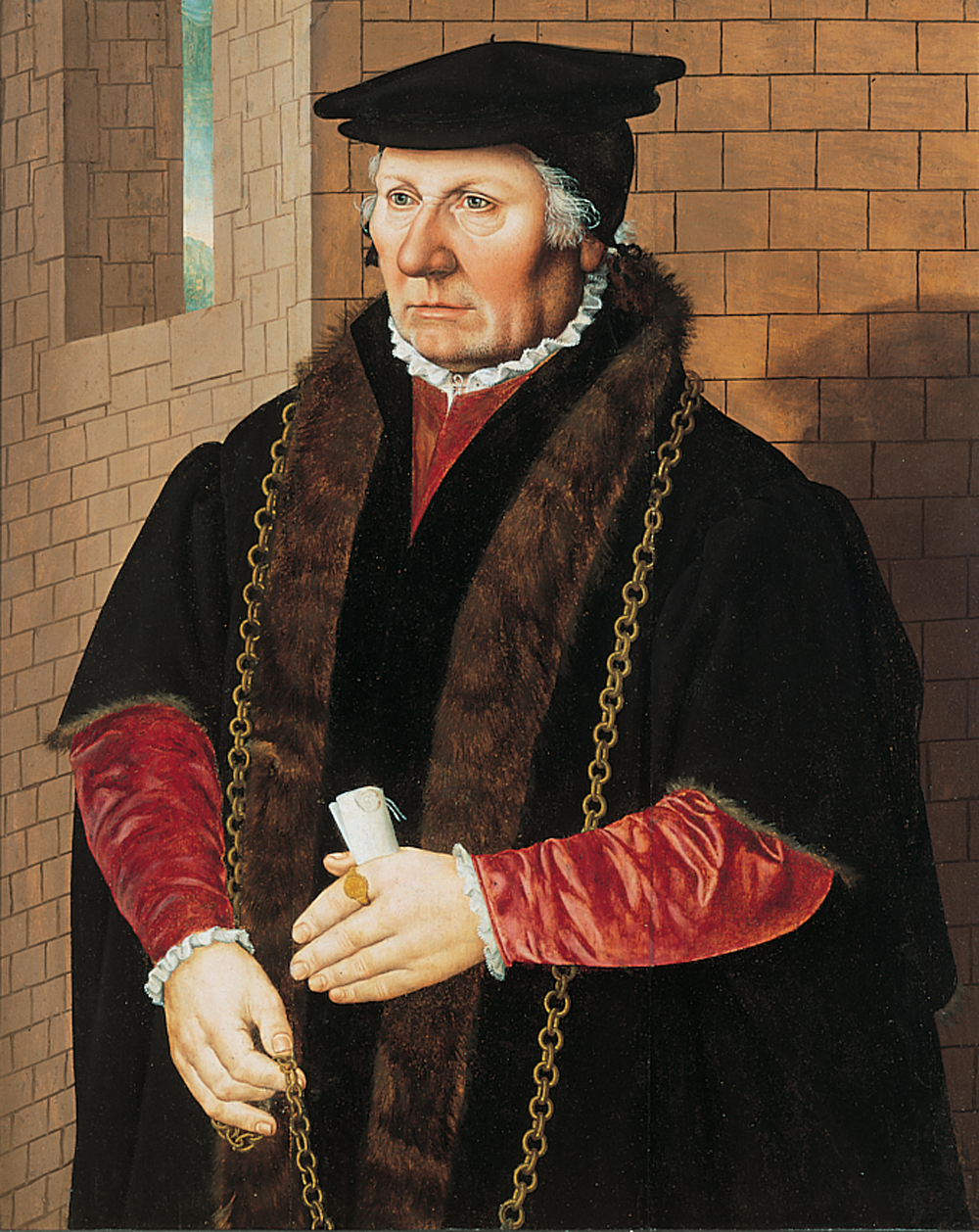

Lord Mayor of London
- In office 1559
- Preceded by: Thomas Leigh
- Succeeded by: William Chester

Personal details
- Born: 1505
- Died: January 25, 1567 (aged 61–62)
- Resting place: St Martin Orgar, City of London, England

Sir William Hewett (also Hewit, Huett, and Hewet; c. 1505 – January 25, 1567) was a prominent merchant of Tudor London, a founding member and later Master of the Worshipful Company of Clothworkers of London as incorporated in 1528, and the first of that Company to be Lord Mayor of London, which he became in the first year of the reign of Queen Elizabeth I. His career arched across the first four decades of the Company's history, and drew him inexorably, if sometimes reluctantly, into the great public affairs of the age.

== Origins and early career ==
William, and his brother Thomas Hewett (died 1576), were born in the hamlet of Wales, in Laughton-en-le-Morthen, West Riding of Yorkshire, the sons of Edmund Hewett. The family was strongly associated with the neighbouring parish of Killamarsh (Derbyshire), in the Rother Valley. Edmund was apparently one of several brothers: various Hewett cousins, notably the sons of Francis Hewett (died 1560), followed in the Clothworkers' Company of London. There was a near family relationship to the judge Sir Francis Rodes (son of John Rodes of Staveley and Attelina Hewett), who built Barlborough Hall, the lost Hickleton Palace and a hall at Great Haughton.

William got off to a flying start as one of the new men of the Guild or Fraternity of the Assumption of the Blessed Virgin Mary of Clothworkers in the City of London, a livery company Incorporated by Charter of King Henry VIII in 1528 by the amalgamation of the two earlier Guilds or Mysteries of the Fullers and the Shearmen. Unless free by patrimony, his own apprenticeship was served in one of the parent Guilds. He took an apprentice of his own as early as 1529–30, and was Junior Warden in the Mastership of John Permeter, 1531–32. He served thereafter with the Company's Court of Assistants, sometimes auditing the accounts and performing other responsible duties. He obtained a substantial Company loan for his brother (also a citizen Clothworker, who assisted in his business) in February 1537/8, binding himself as security. He appears in litigation with the Merchant Taylor John Yorke.

== The Master and his wife ==
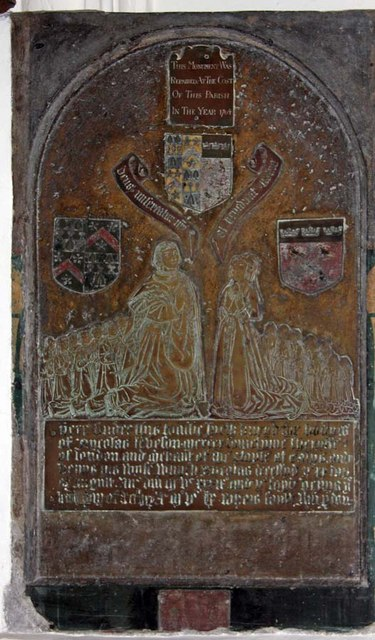
Brass (1539) to Nicholas Leveson (d. 1539) and wife Dionysia (d. 1560): St Andrew Undershaft.

The senior Clothworker Edward Altham had served as Sheriff, but not as alderman of the City, in 1531–32. The status of the Company advanced early in 1538 when John Tolous, First Warden in 1536–37, was elected Alderman for Tower ward. It appears that, being required to transfer to a more senior Company, he refused, and was briefly imprisoned in the Newgate. The Clothworkers then promised faithfully to do their bounden duty for the honour and common wealth of the city, and the Court therefore acknowledged them to be among the twelve head Companies of London (from which progress to the Court of Aldermen, and thereby to the shrievalty and mayoralty, should normally arise): Tolous was not required to transfer, and became alderman. The Company showed their appreciation by making Tolous their Master in August 1538. Hewett, who became First Warden in the succeeding Mastership of Thomas Spenser, 1539–40, faced altered career expectations as in August 1543 he was elected Master of the Company; in the same year Tolous was chosen one of the Sheriffs.

Sir William Bowyer, who died in office as Lord Mayor in 1544, mentioned both Tolous and Hewett among his loving friends, and gave forty shillings to the "Honnest Company of Shooters" to be spent by Hewett at a supper at Mile End. As the Master's chair approached, Hewett married Alice, daughter of Nicholas Leveson, Mercer and Merchant of the Staple of Calais (who died in 1539). Nicholas and his brother James Leveson (died 1547), of Wolverhampton origins, were very prominent merchant citizens and Mercers in London during the 1520s and 1530s, and Nicholas had been Sheriff of London in 1534–35. Leveson's wife Dionysia (Bodley) had brought him numerous sons and daughters, of whom Alice was the third, unmarried at the time of her father's death. James Leveson had married Margery, full sister of Thomas Offley, around 1530. The wealth and reputation of the Leveson mercantile operation, linked to their Kentish estates around the River Medway, continued in Dionysia, her descendants and near kindred.

William and Alice Hewett had several children, of whom only one, Anne, born in 1543, reached maturity, despite having been dropped by accident into the River Thames from a house on (or near) London Bridge at an early age. The hero of this story (first published from family tradition by John Strype in 1720), who dived in and rescued her, was Hewett's apprentice Edward Osborne (c.1530–1592), whose service to him began in 1544 or 1545, becoming free in 1553. Hewett therefore laid the foundations of Osborne's future success.

== Alderman and Sheriff of London ==
Augustine Hynde, slightly junior to Hewett, became Master of the Company in August 1545 and was chosen alderman in April 1546. Tolous, who should have been the first Clothworker Lord Mayor, died in 1548, as the Company Hall and Parlour at Mincing Lane were rebuilding. If Hewett was reluctant to accept civic office, Edward VI's accession might have encouraged him: but when, after a year as Auditor to the City, he was elected for the Vintry ward in September 1550, he at first refused to serve and was committed to the Newgate until he accepted. This sat uncomfortably with the Company's former promise of duty, to which it owed its position among the Twelve. Hynde, a busy alderman, was by then (with Richard Turke and William Blackwell) an efficient Trustee for the City in the matter of the chantry lands and estates, and became Sheriff at Michaelmas 1550.

William Hewett was among the Merchant Adventurers and Merchants of the Staple summoned by the Duke of Northumberland to sign the Letters Patent for the Limitation of the Crown, as the succession to King Edward was planned. The King died on 6 July and Queen Jane was proclaimed on the 10th. The distinguished former Mayor Sir Ralph Warren, alderman for Candlewick ward, died on the following day, and was buried on the 16th. William Hewett transferred from Vintry ward and was sworn for Candlewick on 18 July. On the following day Queen Mary I was proclaimed. John Crymes, former Master of the Clothworkers, having successfully pleaded age and infirmity, another, John Machell (Master 1547–48), who had served as City Auditor for two years, was chosen and sworn alderman for Vintry ward on 20 July. On 23 July Thomas Offley was named by the Mayor Sir George Barne to serve as Sheriff for the coming year, and on 1 August Thomas Lodge (then in Flanders), not yet an alderman, was chosen by the Commons to serve with him. On 3 August the Mayor and aldermen welcomed Queen Mary to London at Smithfield Bars and presented to her the sceptre.

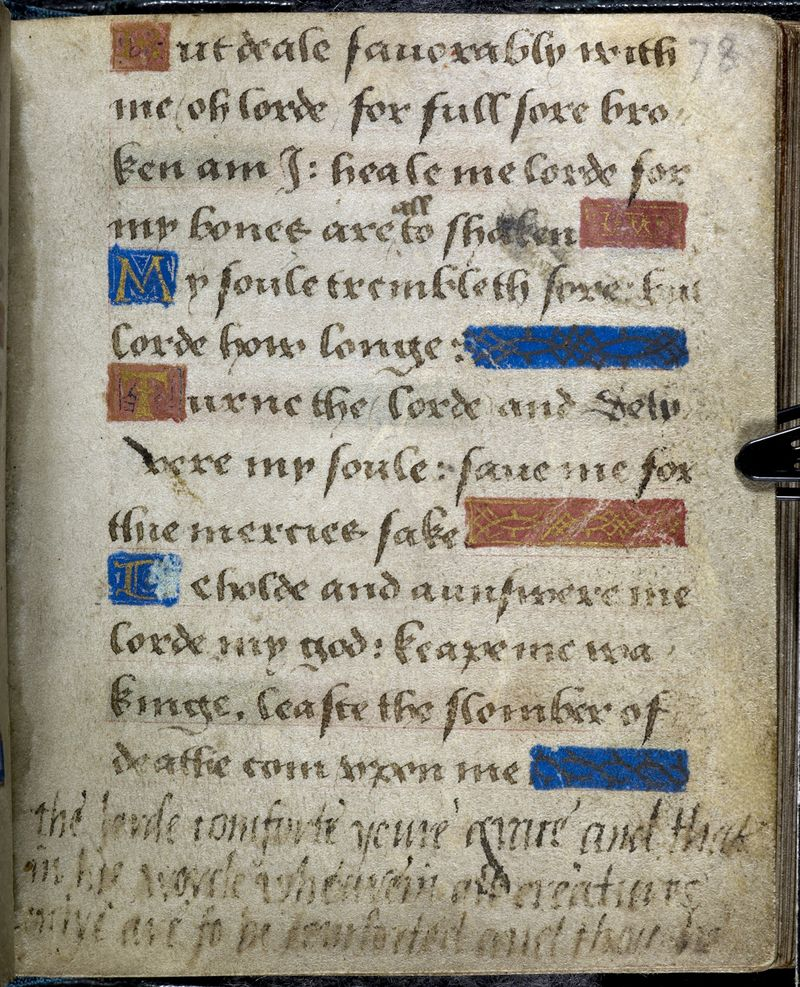
Page from the prayerbook of Lady Jane Grey (Harley MS 2342)

After a riot at Paul's Cross on 13 August, Mayor and aldermen were threatened by the Queen's Council with loss of the City's liberties. There followed the arraignment and execution of Northumberland and the appointment of new officers. Lodge was elected alderman of Cheap ward, vacant by the death of Stephen Kirton, on 23 August, but remained unsworn at Michaelmas Eve (28 September), when the sheriffs customarily took up their term of office and the new Mayor was elected. William Hewett was therefore installed to take his place as Sheriff with Offley. Queen Mary's progress to her Coronation occurred on 30 September and 1 October 1553. Lodge was sworn alderman on 24 October: Thomas White took his oath as Mayor in succession to Sir George Barne on 28 October, and on 10 December was presented to the Queen and knighted by the Earl of Arundel.

Hewett's loyalty thus accepted, by Letters Patent of 4 November 1553 he received a grant of arms. On 13 November Thomas Cranmer, Guildford Dudley and Lady Jane Grey, Ambrose and Henry Dudley, were arraigned for High Treason at the Guildhall and condemned to die. When news of Wyatt's rising in Kent reached the Mayor on 25 January, Sir Thomas White and the sheriffs secretly arrested the Marquess of Northampton that night in Sir Edward Warner's house, and Warner was kept in Hewett's lodgings until he could be delivered to the Tower. On 1 February Mary announced the rebellion in the Guildhall, and next day the aldermen together raised a muster of a thousand men, each in their own wards, for the defence of the City. The assault on London followed, and the defeated rebels were condemned on 10 February.

On 12 February 1554 Guildford Dudley was delivered to Offley by the Lieutenant of the Tower to be led to his execution. It is said that Jane was committed to William Hewett: but according to John Stow, she was led to the scaffold by the Lieutenant himself. The condemnation of a Kentish husbandman (later pardoned) that day at the Old Bailey shows Mayor and Sheriffs about their work. Over the months which followed, Hewett and Offley were locked unalterably into their official role in Mary's sanguinary retribution.

== Approach to the Mayoralty ==
Augustine Hynde died in August 1554 leaving the Clothworkers still without a prospective Mayor, but in 1555–56, at the height of the persecutions, John Machell transferred to Bassishaw and served as Sheriff (with Sir Thomas Leigh). During 1556 three other Clothworkers, James Altham (son of Edward Altham the Sheriff), John Hawes (or Halse) (Master, 1546–47) and Richard Foulkes (Master, 1550–51) were advanced to the aldermanry. After Foulkes was sworn to Vintry ward on 19 January 1556/7, in February Hewett appealed earnestly to be discharged from 'his cloke and room', but in June he was persuaded by a small committee appointed by the Court of Aldermen to alter his decision. James Altham served as Sheriff in 1557–58, and soon afterwards lost his wife in childbirth. It was said by Henry Machyn, that John Machell should have been Lord Mayor in the appointment for 1558–59, but he died in August 1558 and it was Sir Thomas Leigh who as Mayor attended the Coronation of Queen Elizabeth, one of his Sheriffs being John Hawes.

Hewett's very considerable wealth certainly qualified him for civic office. From his mansion in Philipot Lane and his premises at the Sign of Three Cranes in Candlewick Street (in St Martin Orgar) he associated various members of his family in business. Henry Bosvile, younger brother of Godfrey (manorial lord of Gunthwaite and Oxspring), became Hewett's servant and assisted at his purchase of a Lincolnshire manor at Beesby (?or Beelsby) in the soke of Waltham with lands at Brigsley, North Thoresby, Wold Newton and North Coates (near Grimsby) in May 1554.

Yorkshire remained important: he enjoyed the patronage and friendship of the Earls of Shrewsbury, who as Lords of Hallamshire at their principal seat of Sheffield Castle commanded his natural loyalty. Thomas Hewett, his brother, had purchased the manor of Shireoaks (near Worksop) in 1546, where Shireoaks Hall was built by his descendants. George Talbot (the 6th Earl) became a member of the Clothworkers' Company: in October 1557 Hewett had to defer recovery of a £2000 debt from William Lord Dacre of Gilsland and his son (George's uncle and cousin) while they were absent with Francis, the 5th Earl preparing against a Scottish invasion. In 1560 Hewett and Sir John Lyon joined the 5th Earl in a bond of 10,000 marks towards the jointure of Elizabeth Blount, widow of Sir Thomas Pope, whom the Earl hoped to marry. In autumn 1559 Hewett was party to a fine levied for the sale of Wales Wood Hall, 12 messuages, 6 cottages and lands in the Yorkshire lordship of Wales.

== Mayoralty, 1559–1560 ==
Hewett finally became Lord Mayor in October 1559, the first such appointment of Elizabeth I's reign and the first Clothworker to be Lord Mayor. The Sheriffs were Thomas Lodge and Roger Martyn. On 8 November he was sent a letter from the Privy Council requiring that he 'might cause speedy reformation of divers enormities in the same city', particularly with reference to laws controlling consumption, the wearing of extravagant clothing, the serving of meat in hostelries on fast-days, and the over-pricing of goods. He was to remedy the shortage of victuals and fuel, to seek out houses of illegal dicing and other 'plays and games', and to make weekly progress reports. A declaration on the price of poultry followed in April.

The Mayor was soon called to preside at the Guildhall trials for High Treason upon the senior officers at the surrender of Calais in December 1557 – January 1558. The Indictments against Thomas Lord Wentworth, Sir Ralph Chamberlain, Edward Grymston, John Harleston and Nicholas Alysaunder had been prepared in July 1558. They were accused of having conspired with the French King to surrender Ruysbank, Newenham Bridge and Calais to him deliberately, preparing no defence against the pre-arranged approach of the Duke of Guise (who merely made a pretence of siege), and intentionally admitting a French force by the Bulleyn gate. In April 1559 Wentworth was found Not Guilty. William Hewett presided at the trial of Edward Grymston, Comptrollor of Calais, between 28 November and 1 December 1559 (who was found Not Guilty and discharged), and then at the arraignment of Sir Ralph Chamberlain, Lieutenant of the Castle of Calais, and John Harleston, Lieutenant of the Castle of Ruysbank, between 19 and 22 December: they were found Guilty and sentenced to die at Tyburn. However on 8 June 1560 Sir Ralph received a royal pardon and restitution of his goods.

Hewett made the river-journey to court to receive his knighthood on 21 January 1560. He was appointed President of St Thomas' Hospital, Southwark, and maintained that position, and his alderman's cloak, for the rest of his life. Richard Foulkes, being nominated Sheriff in August 1560, was able to withdraw by payment of a fine of £200: the distinguished Clothworker Rowland Hayward, Master of the Company 1559–60, was advanced to the aldermanry in his place, later serving twice as Lord Mayor. The succession thus secured, and honour so satisfied, James Altham was also discharged from the aldermanry at the end of July 1561.

Elizabeth's important reforms to her coinage, which included much debased currency, provided perhaps the last duties of Hewett's mayoralty. The Queen wrote to him on 4 October 1560 instructing him to strike marks upon the debased Edwardian silver testoons (shillings and part-shillings) still in currency, devaluing those marked with a portcullis to fourpence-halfpenny, with a greyhound to twopence-farthing, and those unmarked to no value. At the same time she issued instructions to her various Treasurers to send all unserviceable plate to the mint for rendering into coin. Hewett was thus concerned in these affairs with Sir William Cecil, Sir Edmund Peckham (High Treasurer of the Mint), Sir John Yorke, Sir Thomas Parry, the Worshipful Company of Goldsmiths, and also the Marquess of Winchester and Sir Richard Sackville, Commissioners for the Coinage, whom Her Majesty suspected of deceiving her. Thomas Lodge was also occupied with the reforms, and brought workers from Germany to assist in the refining, many of whom suffered from arsenic poisoning as a result. In August 1562 Hewett served on an imposing Bench of justices at the Guildhall arraignment of several counterfeiters, four of whom were condemned to death.

== Elizabethan alderman ==
Sir William's mother-in-law Dionysia Leveson died late in 1560, leaving her extensive estates at Halling and elsewhere in Kent to her sons and making Sir William Hewett and John Southcott two of her executors. As matriarch of the continuing Leveson enterprise she represented a most powerful arm of Hewett's influence, was godmother to Anne Hewett, and referred to William's brother Thomas as her "gossepp" or spiritual kin. Her will also refers to Edward Osborne, whose career during Mary's reign is somewhat obscure, but remained associated with Hewett's household.

Anne Hewett, then aged 17, was still unmarried, and should become heir to her father's fortune. Over the next two years she received the attention of various prospective suitors including George Talbot, who on his father's death late in 1560 became 6th Earl of Shrewsbury. However by 1562 she was married to Edward Osborne, Hewett having remarked famously "Osborn saved her, and Osborn should enjoy her", according to the story received by Strype. This tale was handed down in the family of the Dukes of Leeds, their descendants, and in later centuries was commemorated by an engraving after Samuel Wale and a mural at the Clothworkers' Hall, since destroyed.

The marriage possibly followed upon the death of her mother Dame Alice, which occurred in April 1561. That was the occasion for a mighty funeral procession, led by 24 poor women and 12 poor men in new gowns; then 40 mourners in black, eight aldermen before the Mayor (Sir William Chester) (Hewett's successor) and the others after him; 20 clerks singing; a pennon of arms, followed by the Heralds, Rouge Croix Pursuivant and Clarenceux King of Arms, and the corpse with 4 pennons of arms and a black velvet pall worked with arms; the chief mourners; 40 women mourners; the Clothworkers in the livery, and 200 others following in the way to St Martin Orgar church, which was hung with black cloth and arms. After the sermon a dinner was held at the house, also hung with black and arms. The monument raised for her was destroyed in the Great Fire of London, together with most of the church.

Sir William remained clubbable, and of good appetite. At the Grocers' Company feast in June 1561 he was a guest in the company of the Lord Mayor (Sir William Chester), Sir Roger Cholmeley, Sir Martin Bowes, Sir William Garrard, Thomas Lodge and others, entertained with clerks singing and viols playing. A month later he stood deputy for the Earl of Shrewsbury as godfather at the christening of the son of Garter King of Arms Sir Gilbert Dethick. Again at the Merchant Taylors' feast in July 1562, with the Mayor William Harper, Sir Thomas White, Sir Thomas Offley and Sir Martin Bowes, he represented a spirit of unity between guests including the Earl of Sussex, the Earl of Kildare, several of the aldermen, and Dethick and Harvey, Garter and Clarenceux.

Sir Roger Cholmeley purchased a house at Highgate in 1536, becoming its first eminent resident. He built the public and free Grammar School there, on the site of the dissolved hermitage, (according to Strype) in 1562, its chapel being rebuilt by Bishop Sandys. This received Charters by Letters Patent in January and April 1565, incorporating six Governors of whom William Hewett and Roger Martyn, aldermen, stand first in the list. Cholmeley died in 1565.

In the last two years of Hewett's life the Clothworkers' Company, of which he had become the senior figure, plunged into parliamentary action. Clothworkers were suffering from a loss of exports, since the Merchant Adventurers (who received their new Charter from Elizabeth in 1564) increasingly exported unfinished cloth for finishing in Antwerp, cutting out their trade. The Company appealed to the Privy Council in June 1565 seeking to establish a fixed proportion of finished cloth exports and to obtain rights of search to ensure such regulations were obeyed. Their claim to produce cloth of equal standard however proved inconclusive, and in October 1566 they introduced a bill in Parliament to compel merchants to export at least one finished cloth for every four unfinished. After a confrontation with the Merchant Adventurers a revised bill, reducing the proportion to one in ten, was introduced in December and was passed by both Houses, but with inadequate rights of search the Company gained little benefit from it.

== Death and legacy ==
The Minute-book of Highgate School supplies Hewett's date of death on 25 January 1566/7. Hewett made his will on 3 January 1566/7 requesting burial at St Martin Orgar near his wife. It reveals his extensive engagement with his Hewett and Leveson kin. His principal beneficiaries were Edward Osborne and Anne, and Henry Hewett son of his brother Thomas, all four of whom were his executors. Henry inherited the Three Cranes, with remainder to Thomas and then to Edward. Thomas, a wealthy man in his own right, received a tenement in St Clement's Lane. The Crown in Fenchurch Street (St Dionis Backchurch) devolved to Anne his heir, as did his lands in Wales and manor of Harthill in Yorkshire (excepting a farm to his cousin John Rodes) while the neighbouring farm of Woodsetts was given to Osborne. These became the ancestral heart of the Kiveton Park estates of the Dukes of Leeds. Another important beneficiary was William Hewett, his godson, brother to his said nephew Henry, who received the parsonage of Dunton Bassett in Leicestershire and an estate at Mansfield in Sherwood, Nottinghamshire, as well as £5 annually towards his education at Gray's Inn. This, presumably, was the William Hewett admitted to Gray's Inn on 4 March 1565/6.

Other children of Thomas Hewett, his brothers-in-law Thomas Leveson and Edmund Calthorpe and their children, were among many receiving bequests: several of the nephews and nieces were William's godchildren, and Dyonise Hewett and Dyonise Calthorpe were living with him at Candlewick Street. Among his public benefactions were bequests to the Clothworkers (a dinner, and to poor men of the livery), the church and parson of St Martin Orgar, the poor inhabitants of Candlewick, to maidens' marriages and the poor of Wales and Harthill, the poor of St Thomas' Hospital, the poor prisoners of Newgate and Ludgate. He gave two foder of Peak lead towards a new water supply for the city. An Inquisition post mortem on his London properties was taken at the Guildhall before Peter Osborne in March 1567/8. A York Inquisition was taken in 1575–76, probably in connection with the death of his brother Thomas at that time.

=== Portrait ===
The fine portrait of Sir William Hewett was described in the collection of the Dukes of Leeds during the 18th century. After the effects of the last Duke were sold it came into the hands of a Munich art dealer and was bought in 1966 by the Trustees of the Georg Schäfer Collection in Schweinfurt, as a possible work of Ludger Tom Ring the Younger. This attribution being doubted, and the Trustees deciding to focus upon other interests, it was generously released from the Collection and loaned by its owner to the Museum of London. The attribution has transferred to Anthonis Mor, although a Schweinfurt expert considered it to be by an English artist. With the conclusion of the loan of the portrait to the Museum of London, the owner, Mr Derek Hewett of Singapore, donated it to the Worshipful Company of Clothworkers.

Civic offices
Preceded by Thomas Leigh	Lord Mayor of London; 1559–1560	Succeeded by William Chester
