= St Mary Aldermary =

Church in the City of London, England

Coordinates: 51°30′46″N 0°05′36″W

- Guild Church of Saint Mary Aldermary
- St Mary Elder Mary
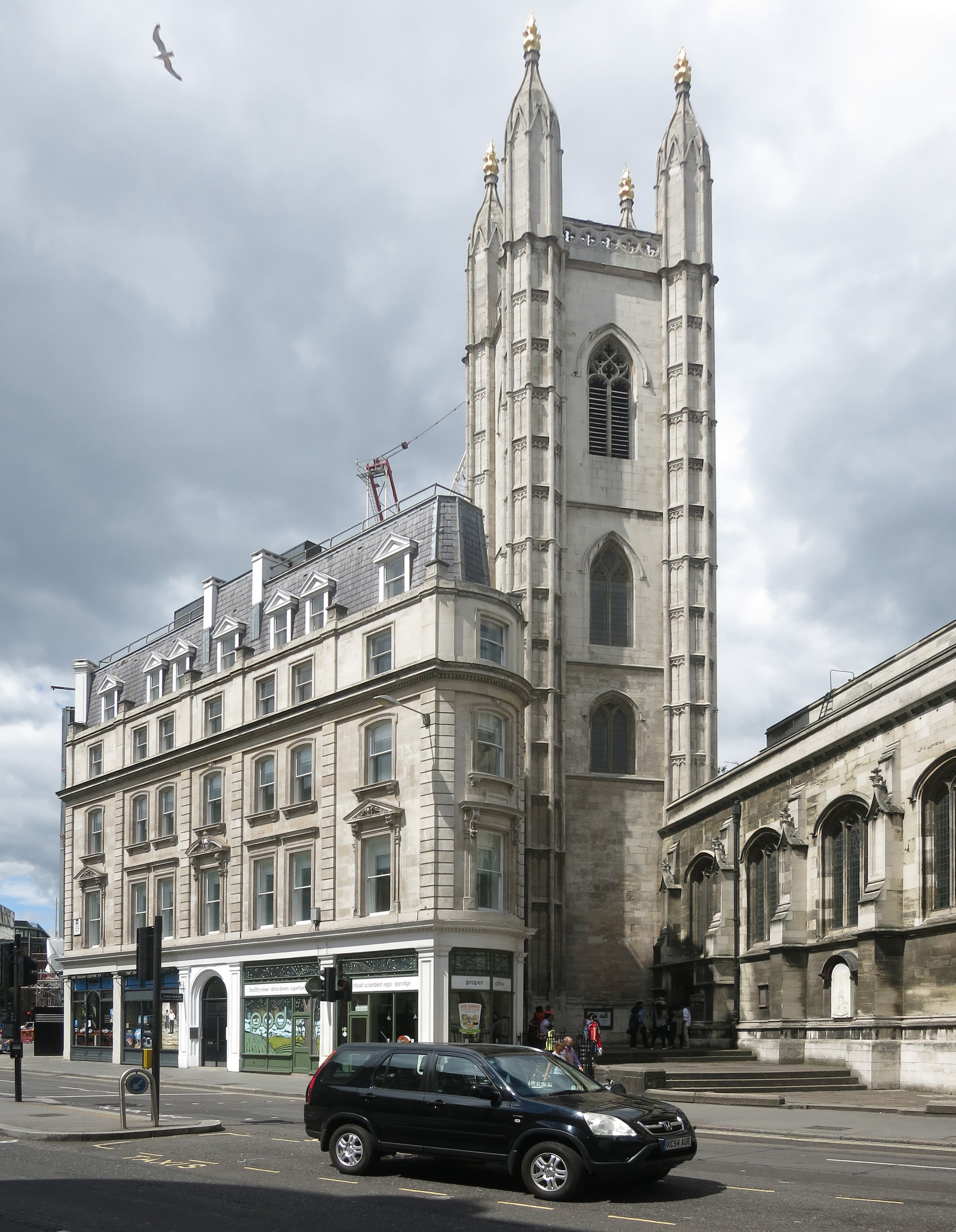
- St Mary Aldermary Church view from Queen Victoria Street

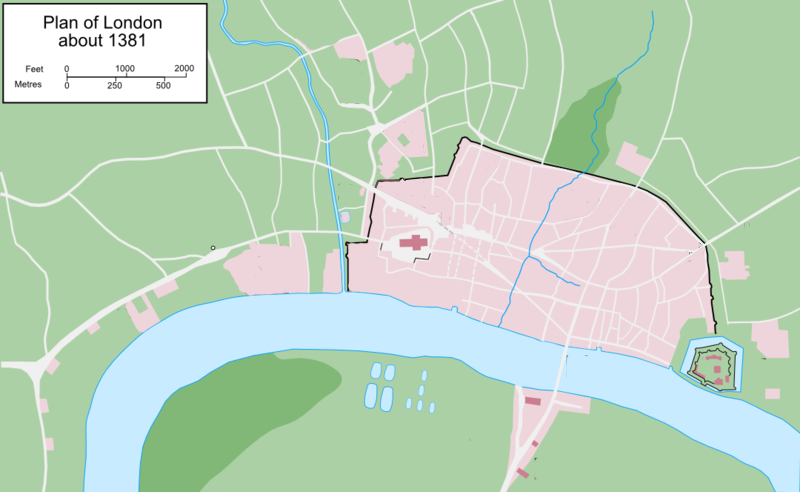
- Location within City of London Location within City of London in 1300
- Location: Bow Lane, City of London, EC4
- Country: England
- Language: English
- Denomination: Church of England
- Previous denomination: Roman Catholic (to 1538)
- Website: stmaryaldermary.com

History
- Founded: 11th century
- Dedication: Mary, mother of Jesus

Architecture
- Heritage designation: Grade I listed building
- Architect: Office of Christopher Wren
- Style: Perpendicular Gothic
- Years built: 1681

Administration
- Diocese: London

Clergy
- Priest: Revd Paul Kennedy

St Mary Aldermary (or St Mary Elder Mary) is an Anglican church located on Bow Lane at the junction with Watling Street, in the City of London within the United Kingdom.

Of medieval origin, rebuilding began in 1510 and was not finished until 1632. Severely damaged just 33 years later during the Great Fire of London in 1666, it was rebuilt once more by the office of Sir Christopher Wren. Unlike most of Wren's City churches, St Mary Aldermary was reconstructed in the Gothic Revival style. In 1952 its role was changed from a parish church to that of a guild church, intended to serve commuters and non-resident workers within the City of London. The main church space acts a public cafe during weekday business hours, with religious and meditative sessions held during mornings and evenings.

== History ==
A church has occupied the site since the 11th century or earlier. Its name is usually taken to mean that it is the oldest of the City churches dedicated to the Virgin Mary. It has also been suggested that, on Bow Lane, it is the older St Mary’s with respect to nearby St Mary Le Bow. The patronage of the rectory of St Mary Aldermary belonged to the prior and chapter of Canterbury, but was transferred to the Archbishop of Canterbury in 1400.

In 1510, Sir Henry Keeble financed the building of a new church. The tower was still unfinished when he died in 1518. In 1629, two legacies enabled it to be completed, and the work, begun 120 years before, was finished within three years. Keeble was buried in a vault beneath the floor of the church, but his grave was not allowed to remain for long. Richard Newcourt recorded that

Sir William Laxton, who died in 1556, and Sir Tho. Lodge [his son-in-law, and the father of the Shakespeare inspiration Thomas Lodge Jr], who died in 1583 (both which were Grocers and had been Mayors of this City), were buried in the Vault of this Sir Henry Keeble, his bones unkindly cast out, and his Monument pull'd down, in place whereof, Monuments were set up of the others.

John Stow mentions various dignitaries buried in the early church in his 1598 Survey of London. They include Richard Chaucer, vintner, said by Stow to be the father of the poet Geoffrey Chaucer. John Milton married his third wife, Elizabeth Minshull, in the church in 1663 (Curiously, he seems to have married his second at St Mary Aldermanbury).

The parish registers date from 1558, and are now deposited in the Guildhall Library.

In 1599 a group of citizens from St. Antholin's founded a lectureship. They gave property in London to pay for a daily lecture in the pulpit at St. Antholin’s and the church became famous as a lecture theatre. The Great Fire burned down the church but daily lectures carried on; it was rebuilt but was demolished in 1870 and the lecture was transferred to St. Mary Aldermary. The lectures are now organised by the Church Society.

=== Rebuilding after the Great Fire ===
St Mary Aldermary was badly damaged in the Great Fire of London of 1666, although parts of its walls and tower survived. It was mostly rebuilt by the office of Sir Christopher Wren in a Gothic style. A legacy of £5,000 had been left by one Henry Rogers for the rebuilding of a church, and his widow agreed to use it to fund the reconstruction of St Mary's. According to some sources, she stipulated that the new church should be an exact imitation of the one largely destroyed.

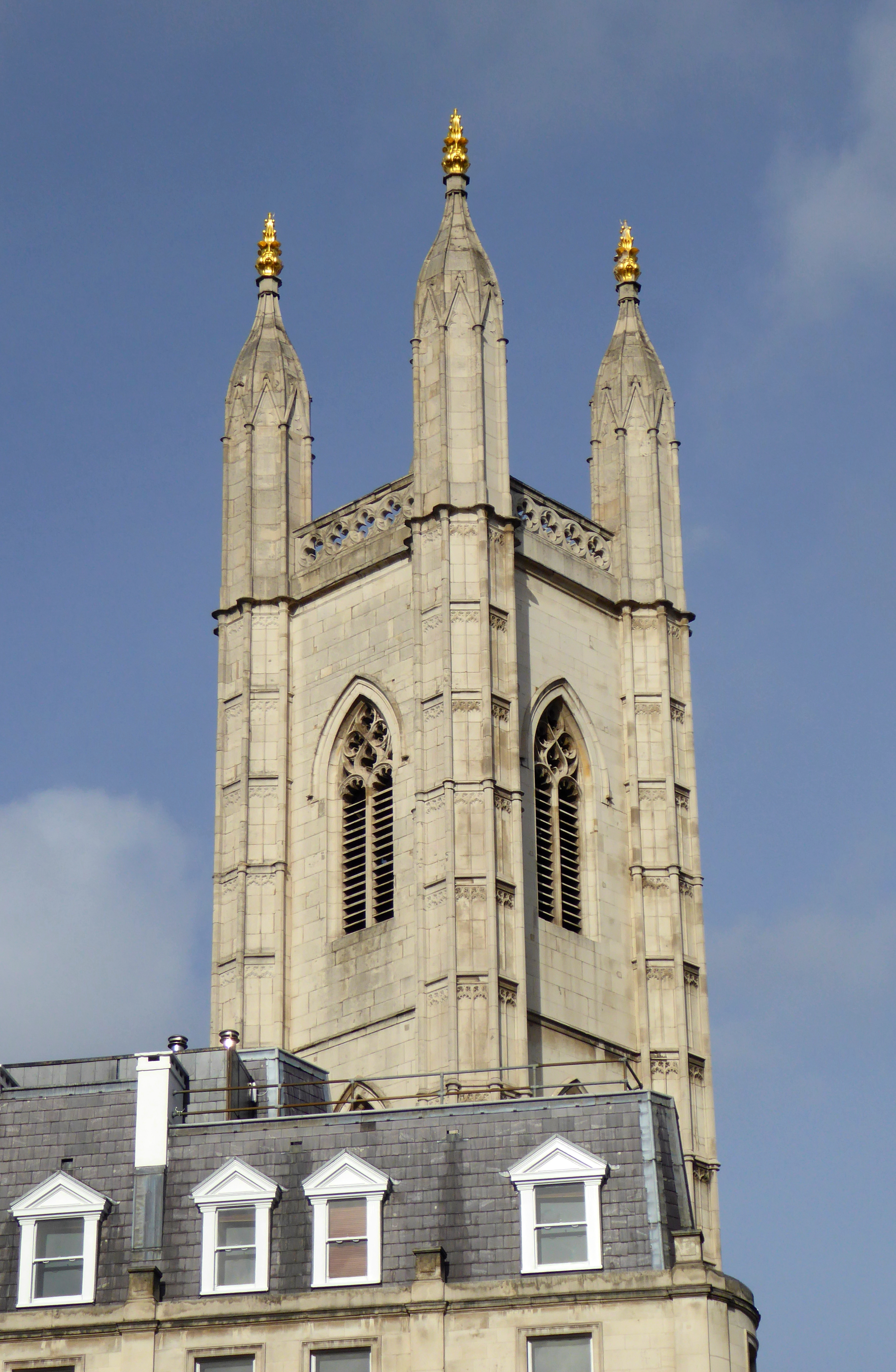
View of the tower of St Mary Aldermary from Cannon St

The church, as rebuilt, has an aisled nave, six bays long, with a clerestory. It has a short chancel. The tower is attached to the south-west corner of the building, and is entered through a western lobby. The tower is divided into storeys by string courses; the corners lead up to octagonal turrets, terminating in what George Godwin called "carved finials of impure design". The church’s nave and aisles are separated by arcades of clustered columns, supporting somewhat flattened Gothic arches. The ceilings are decorated with elaborate plaster fan vaulting.

According to Nikolaus Pevsner, St Mary Aldemary is "the chief surviving monument of the 17th-century Gothic revival in the City and – with Warwick – the most important late 17th-century Gothic church in England".

The parish of the church of St Thomas the Apostle, destroyed in the Great Fire and not rebuilt, was united with that of St Mary's.

In 1781 a new organ was installed, built by George England.

=== Wartime damage ===
St Mary Aldermary was damaged by German bombs in the London Blitz during the Second World War.

=== Restorations ===
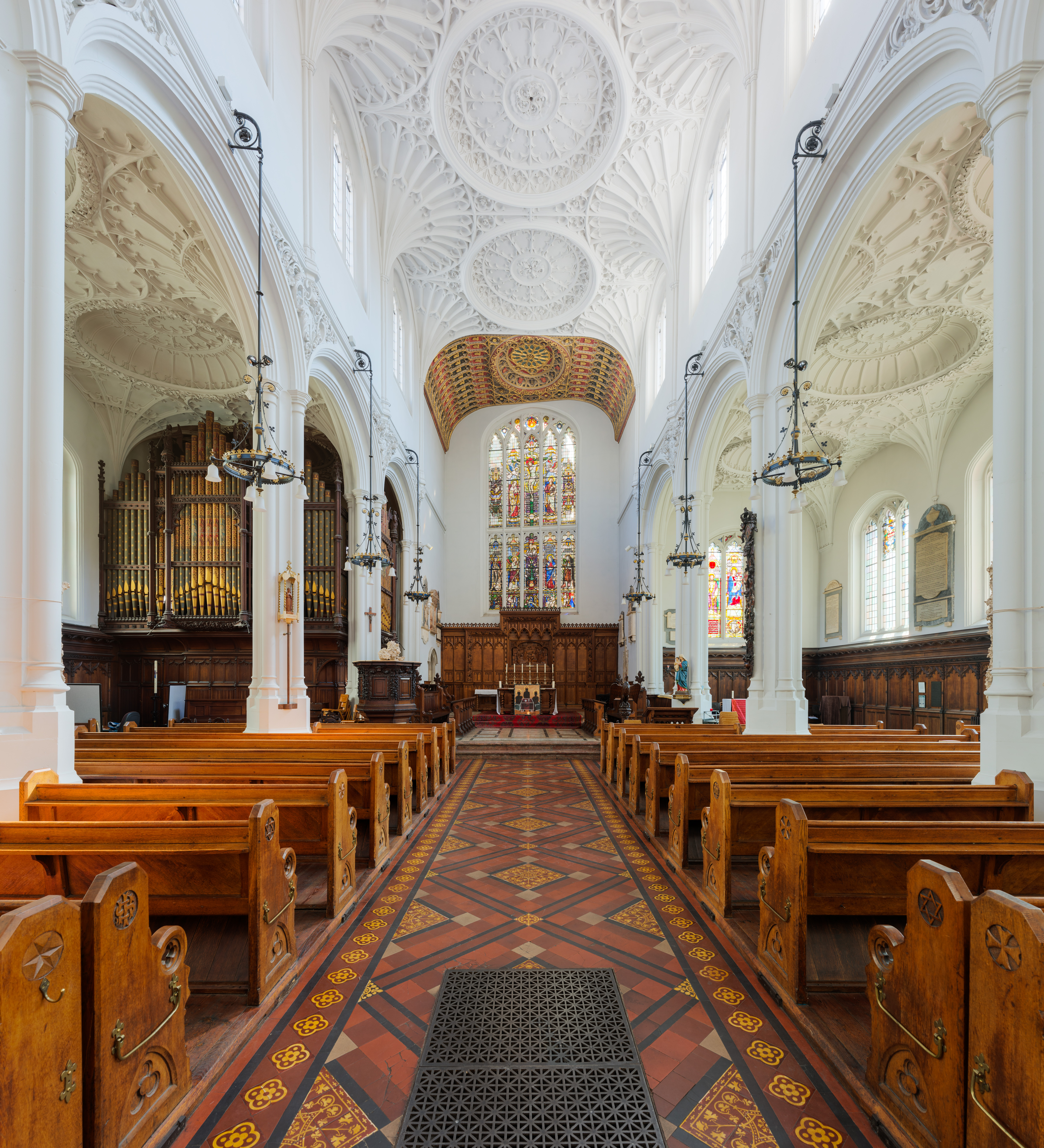
St Mary Aldermary Church Interior

The church has been repaired and restored many times. In 1876–7 major changes were made to the interior: an oak screen was inserted, dividing the lobby from the church; the pews and stalls were replaced, the organ was moved from the western gallery to the chancel; the floor was repaved, new stained glass put into the windows, and a new reredos installed.

The church was designated a Grade I listed building on 4 January 1950.

The latest interior restoration was finished in April 2005, with attention paid to the plaster ceilings and memorials on the north wall. A service was held, presided over by Richard Chartres, the Bishop of London, to celebrate completion, on 21 April 2005.

== Burials ==
- Charles Blount, 5th Baron Mountjoy

== Recent activities ==
In 1989, SMA hosted the Malankara Orthodox Syrian congregation, which combined Keralan styles of South Indian worship with ancient Syriac in the tradition of St Thomas the Apostle, missionary to India. This community later established its own church in London, the St. Thomas Jacobite Syrian Orthodox Church.

Since 2007, the church has been the Regimental Church of the Royal Tank Regiment.

In January 2010, the Bishop and Archdeacon of London invited the Moot Community to make their home in St Mary Aldermary. Moot was a Church of England community set up in the spirit of the Fresh Expressions initiative of that decade. Members committed to living a "rhythm of life", encompassing spiritual practices such as prayer, meditation and presence, and values such as acceptance, balance, creativity and hospitality.

In 2012 Moot set up a café, Host, which continues to sell fair trade coffee and goods.

Since 2019, the church also hosts the Moldovan Orthodox Church of St Nicholas for services including vespers.

== See also ==
- List of churches and cathedrals of London
- List of Christopher Wren churches in London

== Sources ==
- Daniell, A.E. (1896). London City Churches. London: Constable.
- Godwin, George; John Britton (1839). "St Mary's, Aldermary". The Churches of London: A History and Description of the Ecclesiastical Edifices of the Metropolis. London: C. Tilt. Each chapter paginated separately.
- Wilson, H.B. (1840). Brief Notices of the Fabric and Glebe of St Mary Aldermary, in the City of London. London: W. Pickering and R. Jennings & Co.
