= Thomas Curtis (lord mayor) =

English pewterer and politician

Sir Thomas Curtis (sometimes Thomas Curteys; died 27 November 1559) was an English pewterer and politician who was elected Lord Mayor of London in 1556. He was knighted in 1557.

Born circa 1502 to John Curtis of Enfield, Middlesex, Thomas Curtis was one of the most important pewterers of his time, and served as warden of the Worshipful Company of Pewterers in 1524 and master of the company in 1538, 1539, 1545, and 1546. His touch mark appears on much of the pewter later found on the Mary Rose, as well as about thirty percent of the pewter found in a shipwreck near Punta Cana, lost en route to the Americas.

His public career started inauspiciously; he was elected as one of the Sheriffs of the City of London in 1546 against his will, and contested his election up to the day he was sworn in. At the end of his term, he was elected one of the MPs for London. He left Parliament in 1551 to become alderman of Farringdon Within. At that time, he was still a member of the Pewterer's Company, which brought him into conflict with the customary requirement for aldermen of London to be members of one of the Great Twelve City Livery Companies. He was sent to Newgate Prison and fined for his refusal to comply, after which he became a fishmonger. He was elected mayor of London in 1556. The only other pewterer to become mayor of London, John Fryer, likewise became a fishmonger.

== Death ==
Curtis died on 27 November 1559. His son predeceased him, leaving a granddaughter, Anne, as heir. She married the mercenary Thomas Stukley; her inheritance launched Stukley's public life. Curtis was buried at St Dionis Backchurch on 6 December 1559.

Civic offices
Preceded by Thomas Offley	Lord Mayor of London; 1557–1558	Succeeded by Thomas Leigh
