= William Laxton (Lord Mayor of London) =

Lord Mayor of London

Sir William Laxton

Lord Mayor of London
- In office 1544–1545
- Preceded by: Ralph Warren
- Succeeded by: Martin Bowes

Personal details
- Born: c.1500 Oundle, Northamptonshire, England
- Died: 27 July 1556

Sir William Laxton (c. 1500 – 27 July 1556) was a Lord Mayor of London during the reign of Henry VIII, and eight times Master of the Worshipful Company of Grocers. He was the founder of Oundle School.

== Life ==
Laxton was born in Oundle, Northamptonshire, England, the son of John Laxton, a local merchant. He was educated at the grammar school in Oundle situated in the old 'gildhouse' in the churchyard of St Peter's parish church. Upon leaving school he went to London and became an apprentice of the Worshipful Company of Grocers in London. Having completed his seven-year term in 1519 he gained his freedom and prospered. In 1525 the citizen Grocer and Merchant Adventurer Robert Basford of All Hallows, Honey Lane named him as executor together with his widow Katherine and brother Edward, though at Basford's death in 1528 Edward and William reserved power at probate.

He had at least one brother, John Laxton, who was also apprenticed a Grocer but appears to have died young: John was the father of William's heir Joan, who married an apothecary Thomas Wanton. It is likely that one Richard Laxton, apprenticed to John Preste (Grocer and Merchant Adventurer) in 1517, was also his brother, and there was a sister Joan who married Edward Cacher, of the Pewterers' Company. In 1531 William Laxton, John Prest and Edward Cacher, and two others, together purchased messuages and land in Bishop's Stortford, Hertfordshire. After gaining his livery Laxton was elected to the Court of Assistants, and was made junior warden on 16 July 1534.

In March 1535/6 Laxton was elected Alderman for the Aldersgate ward, and for the years 1536–37 and 1538–39 he was Master of the Grocer's Company. Laxton applied for and received a grant of arms in 1536. He served as Sheriff of London in the year 1540–41, together with Martin Bowes, in the mayoralty of Sir William Roche. Although these selections were made in July or August, the shrieval term of office did not commence until Michaelmas Eve. Therefore, the executions of Thomas Cromwell and of Dr Robert Barnes and his Lutheran companions, and the King's marriage to Catherine Howard, were all completed before Laxton took office. At Easter 1541 the Mayor, Aldermen and Crafts, greeted the river procession of the King and Queen from Westminster between the Tower and London Bridge "in barges goodlie behanged and sett with banners", and accompanied them to Greenwich. It is particularly recorded that Bowes and Laxton as sheriffs attended Lord Dacre of the South at the Tower of London on 29 July 1541 and accompanied him on foot to Tyburn where he was to be hanged. As the summer approached the executions of the Countess of Salisbury and of Lord Leonard Gray took place at the Tower.

== Marriage ==
In 1541–42, and in 1543–44, he was again Master of the Grocers' Company: and, having transferred as Alderman to the Langbourn ward in 1543, late in 1544 he was elected Lord Mayor. Before May 1539 he had married Joan Kirkeby, daughter of William Kirkeby and widow of Henry Loddington, who had died in 1531 leaving Joan with at least three children. According to heraldic visitations, Luddington, a London Grocer and Merchant Adventurer, originated from the Adlingfleet area of south Yorkshire between Goole and Scunthorpe. William Kirkeby, whom Luddington made an overseer of his will, is also said to have been of Yorkshire parentage. Laxton, who had no children of his own, accepted the Loddington children as stepson and stepdaughters, one of whom (Anne) married the wealthy Grocer William Lane (whose first wife had been sister of Peter Osborne).

== Mayoralty 1544–45 ==
Laxton's mayoralty was an eventful one, during which the King asserted himself towards the Court of Aldermen. His sheriffs were John Wilford and Andrew Judd. Soon after Christmas Henry demanded a national levy (a "benevolence") at 2 shillings in the pound to support his continuing wars in France and Scotland. The mayor and aldermen were required to make the first payments in a formal ceremony at Baynard Castle, and all did so apart from Richard Read, a newly elected alderman, who was immediately sent to the wars in Scotland, on pain of death, and was taken prisoner by the Scots three months later. Soon afterwards Sir William Roche, for speaking to the council's displeasure, was arrested in the presence of the Mayor and aldermen and sent to the Tower. On 8 February 1545 Laxton was presented to the King at Westminster and, after the King had thanked him for supporting his recent military successes, he bestowed upon him the honour of knighthood.

Laxton's part in the first inquisition of the Protestant martyr Anne Askew is told in her own words. Having been detained under the Six Articles Act for her association with Evangelicals, she went before an inquisition led by Christopher Dare. She was then questioned by Laxton (as the temporal authority) on the same points. After Bishop Bonner's Chancellor had also interviewed her, Laxton put her in temporary custody, refusing to accept sureties, and telling Anne's cousin Brittayne that he would be glad to help her but could neither imprison or bail her without consent of the spiritual powers. Of this John Bale remarked, "The Mayor of London, which is the king's lieutenant, and representeth there his own person, standeth here like a dead idol, or like such a servant slave who can do nothing within his own city concerning their matters." However, Laxton's adherence to due process ended in a Not Guilty verdict for Anne in June 1545, and she was acquitted: and the authority of his office was maintained.

Duty of service was again subverted when Richard Jerveis obtained letters patent freeing him from his aldermanry and from future city office. Laxton and the aldermen went in a body to Greenwich and laid their objections before the King and privy council, and Jerveis was induced to resume his office. The Council meanwhile charged the Aldermen to summon the wealthiest citizens to complete the payment of the King's Subsidy. In an atmosphere of growing alarm, large grain imports became necessary, for which the aldermen met the initial costs. The French navy blockaded the Pas de Calais and made attacks on the English coast, and the Mary Rose sank at Portsmouth. A great muster from London marched to Farnham prepared to repel a French army which landed on the Isle of Wight. Intensive house-searches and curfews were imposed on all strangers living in London, and a nightly mounted watch was maintained by the aldermen, Laxton himself taking the first duty. Another muster of 1000 city men was gathered at Finsbury Fields and sent to Dover from Gravesend.

Late in 1545 Sir John Aleyn died after 30 years' service as alderman, and Laxton transferred to the Lime Street ward vacated by his death. Aleyn bequeathed a new Mayoral chain of office, and on St Edward's Day (13 October), his memorable year drawing to its close, Sir William Laxton became the first to wear it as Sir Martin Bowes was elected to succeed him. It was seemingly during Laxton's mayoral year that his stepdaughter Joan Luddington married John Machell, a rising figure in the Clothworkers' Company, whose first wife Ellen was buried at St Peter, Westcheap in 1544, and whose eldest son by Joan was christened there in 1546. Laxton had also renewed his service for a fifth term as Master of the Grocers' Company.

After King Henry's death at the end of January 1546/7, in February his body was borne from London to Windsor. The procession rested a night at Sion House. Ten aldermen, Sir William Laxton and Sir Martin Bowes each with a retinue of four and the others with three, all in their black coats, rode in the company, their harness and bridles muffled in black cloth. Through the reign of King Edward VI Laxton enjoyed three further terms as Master of the Grocers' Company, in 1548–49, 1550–51, and 1552–53. Following the death of William Lane in 1552 Anne Luddington remarried to the Grocer Thomas Lodge, who was formerly married to Mawdleyn, sister of Stephen Vaughan.

== Death and exequies ==
Laxton's will was prepared in July 1556, and he died on the night of 27 July 1556. By his will his stepchildren were fully acknowledged with legacies, though his heir remained his niece Joan Wanton. In his last days he was visited by Richard Grafton and John Southcott to discuss the disposition of his bequests.

Laxton's funeral, on 9 August 1556, was a grand heraldic occasion. In the procession to St Mary Aldermary the body was borne in a hearse with five principals, the majesty and the valence gilt: the house, church and street were decked with black hangings and arms, and there were many penselles and escutcheons: a standard, four pennons and two banners: with a coat armour, helmet, targe and sword, and the crest of a tiger's head with a columbine slipped. There were 34 stave torches, 34 mantle fries gowns for poor men, and one hundred black gowns. The three principal mourners were Thomas Lodge, John Machell and Thomas Wanton, and the Lord Mayor and aldermen were all present in violet gowns, followed by the women mourners, ladies and gentlewomen and aldermen's wives, and many others. After the Dirige the Company of Grocers, the priests and clerks, the heralds, and the Wax-chandlers and others went to the house to drink. On the following day three masses were sung, two of prick-song and one of requiem, and a sermon was preached by Dr. Nicholas Harpsfield, Archdeacon of Canterbury. This was followed by the greatest funeral feast which Henry Machyn had ever witnessed.

A month's mind was held for Laxton on 30–31 August, the hearse illuminated with wax tapers, and on the second day a mass and a sermon, followed by another large feast, after which the hearse was dismantled. He was buried in the tomb of Henry Keble (died 1518), Lord Mayor and four times Master of the Grocers, in St Mary Aldermary; a fact which outraged John Stow, since Keble had been responsible for the rebuilding of the church and was thereby "unkindly cast out". However Keble's monument had formed a chantry, which like other London chantries was deprived of its superstitious uses under Edward VI and then re-granted to the relevant Craft. It is also stated that Keble's tomb had been ransacked during a riot. Its re-use as the burial-place of William Laxton in Mary's time, and afterwards for Dame Joan Laxton and Sir Thomas Lodge, may therefore have been an attempt to preserve rather than to misappropriate the site of the founder's burial.

== Legacy ==
The grammar school which Laxton had attended slipped into decline and eventually closed. Under the terms of his Codicil Sir William left property in London to the Grocer's Company on condition that they paid annual sums of money for the support and maintenance of a new school in Oundle, Laxton Grammar School now called Oundle School, to replace the former school. Laxton planned this bequest during the last two or three years of his life, and its terms were negotiated with the Grocers' Company, who at first resisted involvement owing to difficulties with the tenure of the endowment lands. It fell partly to (Sir) Thomas Lodge and to Lady Laxton to implement the terms of the bequest. Oundle School is now one of the leading independent schools in the United Kingdom.

He also left money to establish almshouses at Oundle for the accommodation of seven poor men, also maintained by the Grocers' Company.

== Family ==
William Laxton had no children of his own, but acknowledged three of his wife's children fully in his will. His principal heir however was his niece Joan, wife of Thomas Wanton. His stepchildren were:

- Nicholas Luddington, who married Avice Rowe, sister of Sir Thomas Rowe (Lord Mayor of London 1568–69, died 1570), and by her had three children. Nicholas Luddington, Grocer, became Governor of the Merchant Adventurers at Antwerp, and, after confrontations with Walter Travers and Thomas Cartwright, had dealings with Sir Francis Walsingham. He died in 1595 or early 1596.
- Anne Luddington, who married first (as his second wife) William Lane, Grocer, and secondly (as his third wife) Sir Thomas Lodge, Grocer, who became Lord Mayor of London in 1562. Anne was the mother of the poet Thomas Lodge. Dame Ann Lodge died in 1579.
- Joan Luddington, who married first (as his second wife) John Machell, Clothworker (Sheriff of London 1555–56, died 1558), by whom she had five surviving children: and secondly (as the second of his three wives) the diplomat Sir Thomas Chamberlayne, by whom she had three surviving children. Dame Joan Chamberlayne died in 1565.

Dame Joan Laxton, a wealthy and influential woman in her own right, long outlived her husband and died in 1576.
