= Edward White (printer) =

London stationer (c. 1548 – c. 1612)

- Born: c.1548
- Died: 1612 (aged 63–64)
- Spouse: Sara Lodge
- Issue: Edward White
- Father: John White

Edward White (c. 1548 – c. 1612) was a London printer and stationer whose career spanned a period of over forty years. His shop in the booksellers' district of St Paul's Churchyard was at the Sign of the Gun, where he sold many anonymous works as well as works by Thomas Kyd, Robert Greene, Anthony Munday and Christopher Marlowe. Between 1594 and 1611 he sold all three quartos of William Shakespeare's Titus Andronicus.

== Family ==
Edward White, born about 1548, was the son of a Suffolk mercer, John White of Bury St Edmunds. His mother's name is unknown.

== Career ==
White began his printing career in 1565 as apprentice to William Lobley. By 1576 he was sufficiently established to take on his brother, Andrew White, as his own apprentice. In succeeding years he is known to have had eleven other apprentices. He entered his first copy in the Stationers' Register on 21 July 1577, The true history and faithful relation of a most horrible murder committed by Alphonse Diazius. On 7 April 1579 he entered Thomas Salter's The mirror of modesty, and dedicated it to his wife's step-mother, Lady Anne Lodge. Lady Lodge lived only a few months longer; on 29 December 1579 White was the first stationer to enter a work by his brother-in-law, Thomas Lodge, An Epitaph of the Lady Anne Lodge, of which no copy now survives.

He was admitted to the livery of the Stationers' Company in June 1588. Although he never attained the office of Master of the Company, he served as under warden in 1600, and as senior warden in 1606.

White's output included a great deal of popular literature. He either licensed, printed or sold some twenty plays, as well as three dozen ballads, and almost the same number of pamphlets.

White died late in 1612 or early in 1613; his last entry in the Stationers' Register bears the date 12 August 1612. His widow survived him, and with their son took over the family printing business until her own death about 1615. Among works licensed to White's son were Sir John Fitz's Ghost (13 September 1605), A new ballad of the late commotion in Herefordshire occasioned by the death of Alice Wellington, a recusant (13 September 1605), and England's joy, or the happy nuptials of Prince Frederick and the Lady Elizabeth (20 February 1613). In 1619 John Grismand partly took over the business, perhaps, Bishai suggests, because White's son was a less successful businessman than his father.

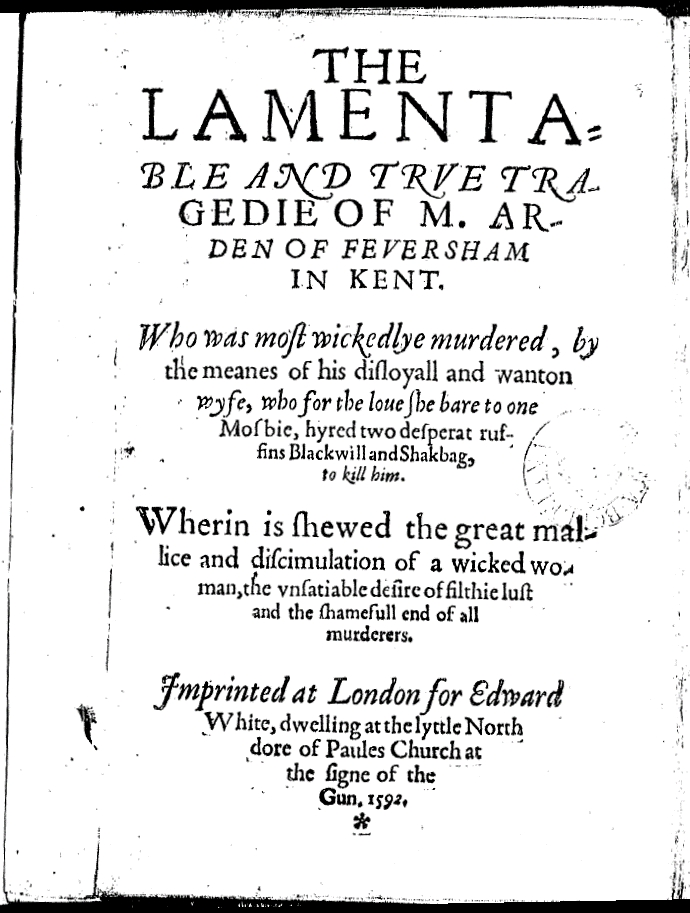
Title page of the first quarto (1592) of Arden of Faversham, printed for Edward White

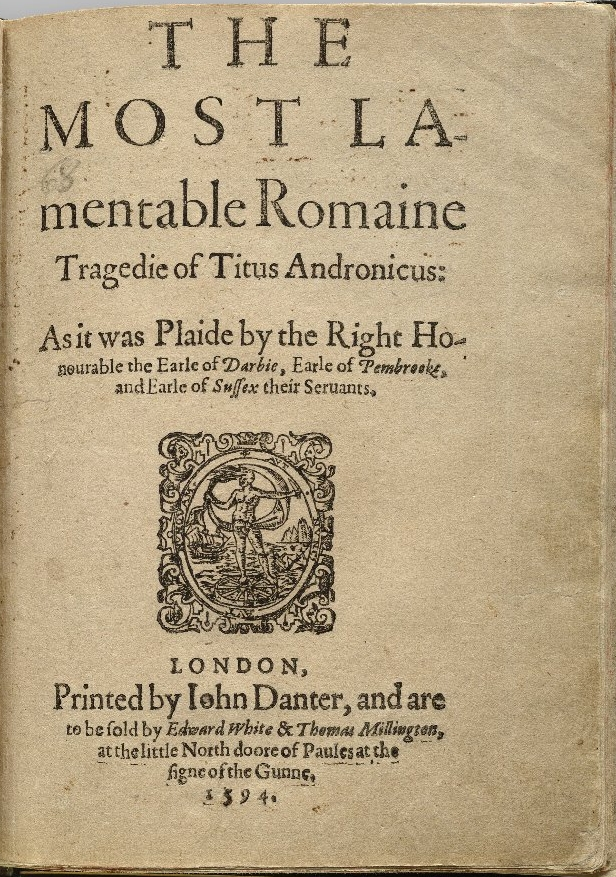
Title page of the first quarto of Titus Andronicus, to be sold by Edward White at the Sign of the Gun

== Marriage and issue ==
White married Sara Lodge (baptized 1549), daughter of Sir Thomas Lodge, Lord Mayor of London, by whom he had at least one son, also named Edward White.

Sara Lodge and her sister, Susan Lodge (baptized 1551), were the only two children of Sir Thomas Lodge's second marriage to Margaret Parker (d. 26 April 1552), while the physician and playwright Thomas Lodge was one of the seven children of Sir Thomas's third marriage to Anne Luddington (1528–1579). Susan Lodge married Thomas Leicester of Worleston, Chester.

== Works licensed, printed or sold by White ==
Works licensed to White in the Stationers' Register and printed or sold by him include:

- Anon., The true history and faithful relation of a most horrible murder committed by Alphonse Diazius (21 July 1577).
- Anon., A doleful discourse or sorrowful sonnet made by one Edward Fallowes who lately suffered death at Saint Thomas Watering for a robbery (30 August 1578).
- Anon., This song the qualities of the world doth show (11 September 1578).
- Salter, Thomas, The mirror of modesty (7 April 1579).
- Anon., A detection of damnable drifts practised by three witches arraigned at Chelmsford in Essex (1579).
- Anon., A rehearsal both strange and true of heinous and horrible acts committed by Elizabeth Stile (1579).
- Anon., The scratching of the witch (19 August 1579).
- Anon., A pleasant and speedy path for the bringing up of young children (3 October 1580).
- Anon., Dance, dance, dance, merry dance, come on and dance with beggary (3 September 1580).
- Averell, William, An excellent history [ ] of Charles and Julia (1582?).
- Anon., A ballad of Malmerophus and Sillera (1582?).
- Munday, Anthony, A discovery of Edmund Campion and his confederates their most horrible and traitorous practises against her Majesty’s most royal person (29 January 1582).
- Anon., The fall of the Earl of Northumberland that killed himself in the Tower (1 August 1586).
- Anon., A warning or fairing to curst wives (1 August 1586).
- Anon., An example to all lewd housewives (1 August 1586).
- Anon., The example of God's wrath over 2 drunkards at Nerkershofen (1 August 1586).
- Anon., The sudden death happenings at Exeter assizes (1 August 1586).
- Anon., A ditty of a prisoner that suffered death at Leicester in Lent 1586 at the assizes (8 August 1586).
- Anon., A cozener of Antwerp (16 August 1586).
- Anon., A ballad of William Cloudesly never printed before (16 August 1586).
- Saunders, Thomas, A true description and brief discourse of a most lamentable voyage made lately to Tripoli in Barbary (1587).
- Parke, Robert, trans., The history of the great and mighty kingdom of China (1588).
- T.D., trans., A true discourse of the most happy victories obtained by the French King against the rebels and enemies of his Majesty (1589).
- Hammon, J., trans., Alektor (1590).
- Anon., The arraignment, examination, confession and judgment of Arnold Cosbye, who wilfully murdered the Lord Burke (1591).
- Wigand, John, De neutralibus & medijs (1591).
- Anon., The lamentable and true tragedy of Master Arden of Faversham (1592, 1599).
- Anon., The truth of the most wicked and secret murdering of John Brewen (1592).
- Greene, Robert, Philomela, the Lady Fitzwalter's nightingale (1592).
- Anon., A ballad showing how a fond woman fondly accused herself to be the King of Spain's daughter (18 December 1592).
- Anon., The history of the damnable life and deserved death of Doctor John Faustus (1592, 1608, 1610).
- Kyd, Thomas, The Spanish Tragedy (1594).
- Shakespeare, William, Titus Andronicus (1594, 1600, 1611).
- Marlowe, Christopher, The massacre at Paris (1594?).
- Levens, Peter, A right profitable book for all diseases called the pathway to health (1596).
- Wright, Leonard, A summons for sleepers (1596).
- Anon., Twenty orders of callets and drabs (3 July 1601).
- Parker, Martin, Admonition [ ] to all such as shall intend hereafter to enter the state of matrimony godly and agreeably to laws (1605?).
- Marlowe, Christopher, Tamburlaine the great, the second part (1606).
- Anon., The assize of bread (1608).
