= General Dictionary, Historical and Critical =

Biographical dictionary published from 1734 to 1741

The General Dictionary, Historical and Critical was a biographical dictionary published from 1734 to 1741 in London in 10 volumes.

== Contributors ==
The dictionary derived from the Dictionnaire historique et critique of Pierre Bayle, already translated into English in 1710 by Pierre des Maizeaux as An Historical and Critical Dictionary, but expanded the material with many biographies of English figures, this work being assigned largely to Thomas Birch. The other two main editors were John Peter Bernard, whose efforts led to his admission as a Fellow of the Royal Society, and John Lockman, who undertook a fresh translation of Bayle's work.

The publishers were Richard Chandler and Caesar Ward.

== Impact ==
The work has been described as the "first important ancestor" of the Dictionary of National Biography.
