= John Lockman (author) =

English author

John Lockman (1698–1771) was an English writer.

== Life ==
Born in humble circumstances, he was a self-taught scholar who learnt to speak French by frequenting Slaughter's Coffee House. He had enough acquaintance with Alexander Pope that he could dedicate to him in 1734 his translation of Charles Porée's Oration. His inoffensive character procured for him the name of the ‘Lamb.’ but when ‘Hesiod’ Cooke abused his poetry, Lockman retorted, ‘It may be so; but, thank God! my name is not at full length in the “Dunciad.”’

His poems were chiefly occasional verse intended to be set to music for Vauxhall. In 1762 he tried, fruitlessly, to get them printed by subscription. He frequently went to court to present his verses to the royal family, and after he became secretary to the British Herring Fishery, he tendered gifts of pickled herrings. Both poems and herrings, he declared, were ‘most graciously accepted.’

He died in Brownlow Street, Long Acre, on 2 February 1771, leaving a widow, Mary.

== Works ==
Lockman worked on the General Dictionary, Historical and Critical including a life of Samuel Butler. He translated many French works, including Voltaire's ‘Age of Louis XIV,’ and ‘Henriade;’ Marivaux's ‘Pharamond;’ and Le Sage's ‘Bachelor of Salamanca.’

Lockman is also the translator of Voltaire's "Letters concerning the English Nation" (London, 1733). The work was first thought to have been partially written by Voltaire himself, in English, in the years following his stay in that country from 1726-28. The hypothesis, posed by Harcourt Brown, was debunked by J. Patrick Lee in his essay, "The Unexamined Premise" (2001). He established that the entire "Letters" had in fact been written in French and then translated into English (Studies on Voltaire and the eighteenth century, 2001:10).

He also published:

- ‘The Charms of Dishabille; or, New Tunbridge Wells at Islington,’ a song, (London, 1733?).
- ‘David's Lamentation over Saul and Jonathan. A Lyric Poem,’ London, 1736; 5th edit. 1740.
- ‘Rosalinda, a Musical Drama …’ with an inquiry into the history of operas and oratorios, London, 1740. It was set to music by John Christopher Smith, and performed at Hickford's Great Room in Brewer Street.
- ‘To the long-conceal'd first Promoter of the Cambrick and Tea-Bills [S. T. Janssen]: an Epistle [in verse],’ London, 1746.
- ‘A Discourse on Operas,’ before Francesco Vanneschi's ‘Fetoute. Drama,’ &c., London, 1747.
- ‘The Shetland Herring and Peruvian Gold-Mine: a Fable,’ in verse, London, 1751; 2nd edit. 1751.
- ‘A proper Answer to a Libel written by L. D. N[elme] … against J. Lockman’ [anon.], London, 1753. An attempt at wit against Lemuel Dole Nelme.
- ‘A faithful Narrative of the late pretended Gunpowder Plot in a Letter to the … Lord Mayor of London,’ London, 1755.
- ‘A History of the Cruel Sufferings of the Protestants and others by Popish Persecutions in various Countries,’ London, 1760.

Lockman wrote also a ‘History of Christianity,’ and histories of England, Greece, and of Rome, by question and answer, which passed through numerous editions. He was a frequent contributor to the Gentleman's Magazine.
