= Thomas Leigh (Lord Mayor) =

English merchant and lord mayor

Sir Thomas Leigh
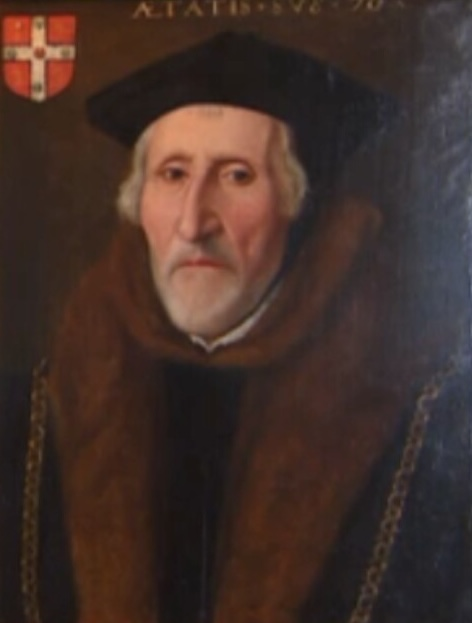

Lord Mayor of London
- In office 1558–1559
- Preceded by: Sir Thomas Curtis
- Succeeded by: Sir William Hewett

Personal details
- Born: c. 1504 Wellington, Shropshire, England
- Died: 15 November 1571 Stoneleigh, Warwickshire, England
- Resting place: Mercers' Chapel, London
- Spouse: Alice née Barker
- Children: Richard Leigh; Ralph Leigh; Winifred Leigh; Rowland Leigh of Adlestrop; Alice Leigh; Sir Thomas Leigh of Stoneleigh, 1st Baronet; Robert Leigh; Sir William Leigh; Mary Leigh; Isabella Leigh; Katherine Leigh
- Occupation: Merchant

Sir Thomas Leigh (c. 1504 – 15 or 17 November 1571) was an English merchant and Lord Mayor of London in 1558–59. He served as a City Alderman from 1552 until 1571.

== Life ==
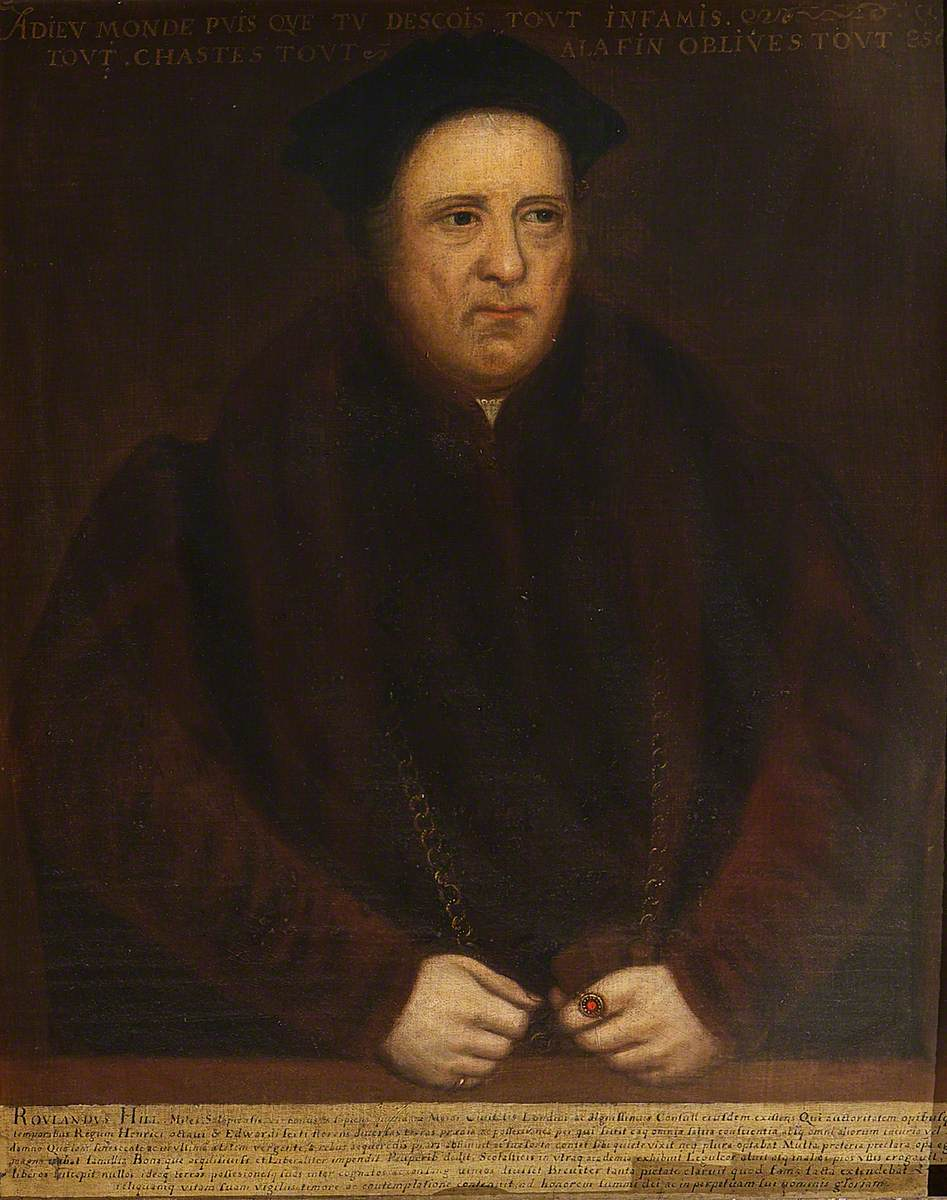
Leigh was a ward of Sir Rowland Hill and married his heiress.

Leigh was born about 1504 at Wellington, Shropshire, to Roger Leigh of Rushall (Willington, County Durham, 1483-1506) and Anne or Alice née Trafford (Leigh, Lancashire, 1487-1551).

He was the great-great-grandson of Piers Leigh whose son Sir Piers Leigh, was wounded at the Battle of Agincourt in 1415, whose family was a cadet branch of the ancient Leighs, of West Hall, High Legh, Cheshire.

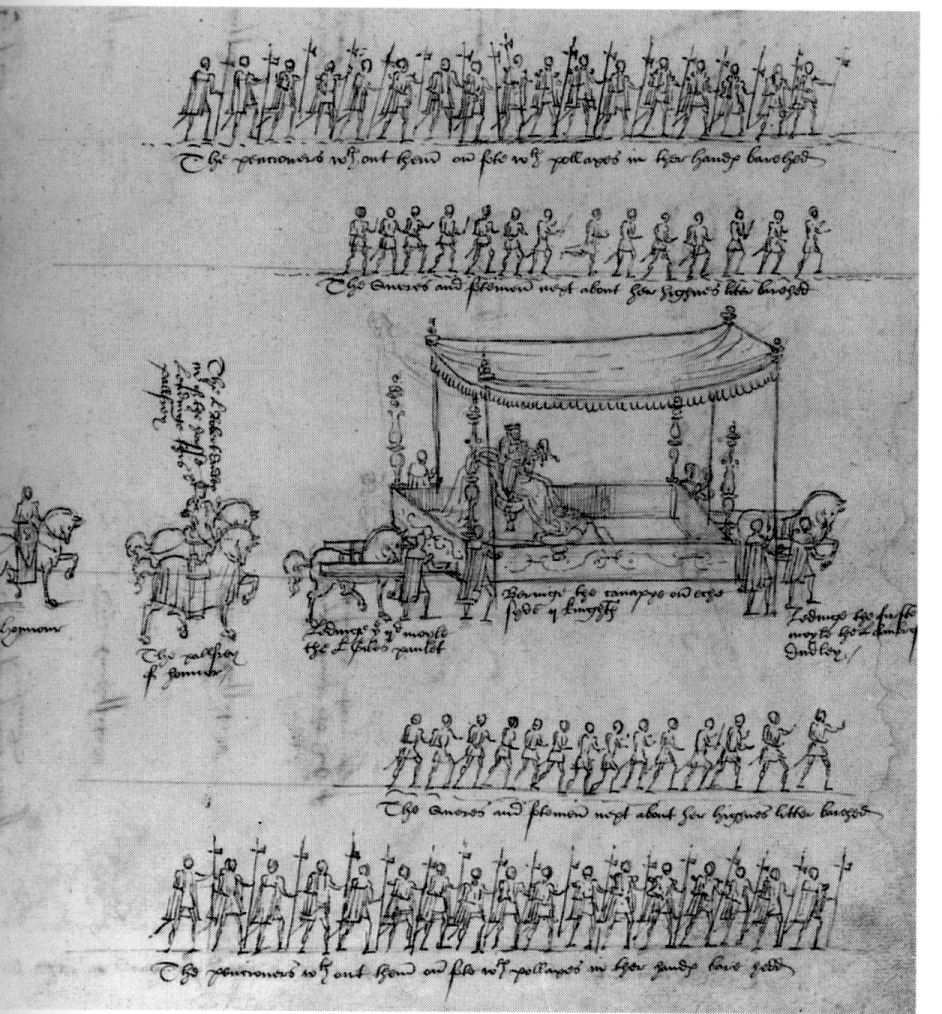
Leigh led the coronation procession of Elizabeth I

Leigh was raised by Sir Rowland Hill, a City mercer and wool merchant, and later joined Sir Rowland's business, and before 1530, he married his maternal niece and heiress, Alice Barker, born in Wolverton, Buckinghamshire, in 1509, daughter of John Barker (Coleshurst, Market Drayton, Shropshire, ca. 1478-4 May 1572) and Elizabeth née Hill (Hodnet, Shropshire, 1479-1539).

The following year of 1536 he was appointed a Justice of the Peace for Shropshire.

Leigh, who was a merchant of the Staple (a restrictive trade group dealing in wool) and served three times as Master of the Mercers' Company, also served as Alderman of London (1552-53) and Sheriff of London (1555–56), and in 1558 became Lord Mayor of London.

He was also a merchant of the Staple and a member of the Merchant Adventurers' Company.

In 1558, after the death of Mary I of England, Leigh led the coronation procession of Elizabeth I of England.

In 1558 or 1559, he was knighted by Queen Elizabeth.

== Residence ==
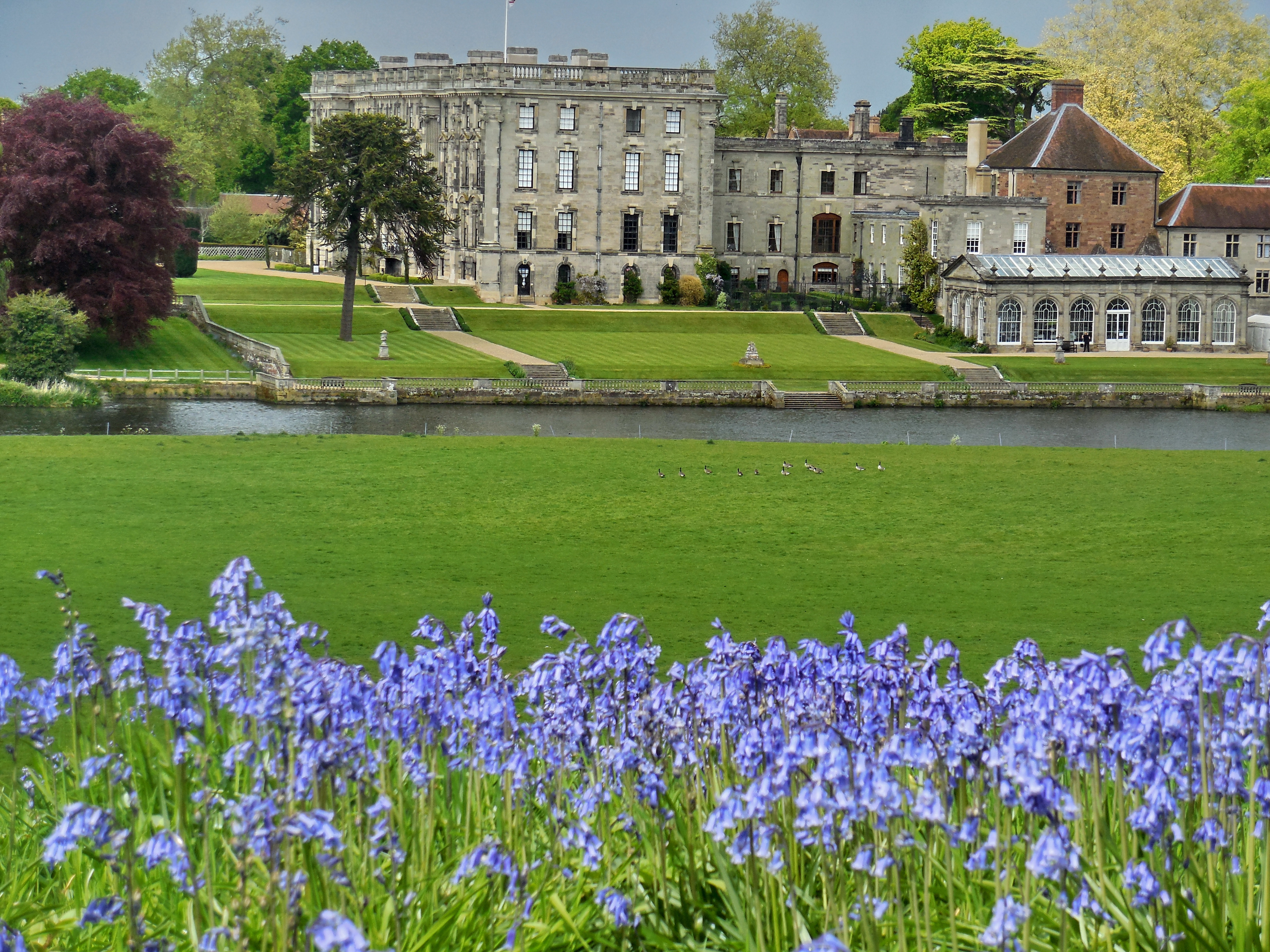
Stoneleigh Abbey purchased by Sir Rowland Hill for Leigh

In 1561, Sir Rowland Hill purchased Stoneleigh Abbey, in Warwickshire, after the Dissolution of the Monasteries for his ward Sir Thomas Leigh, and a mansion was built on the site of the former monastic buildings. Leigh's family and descendants were seated on the estate from 1561 to 1993. He died there on 15 November 1571 and was buried at Mercers' Chapel, London, on 17. His wife also died there in 1603 and was buried at St Dunstan and All Saints, Stepney, Middlesex.

== Family ==
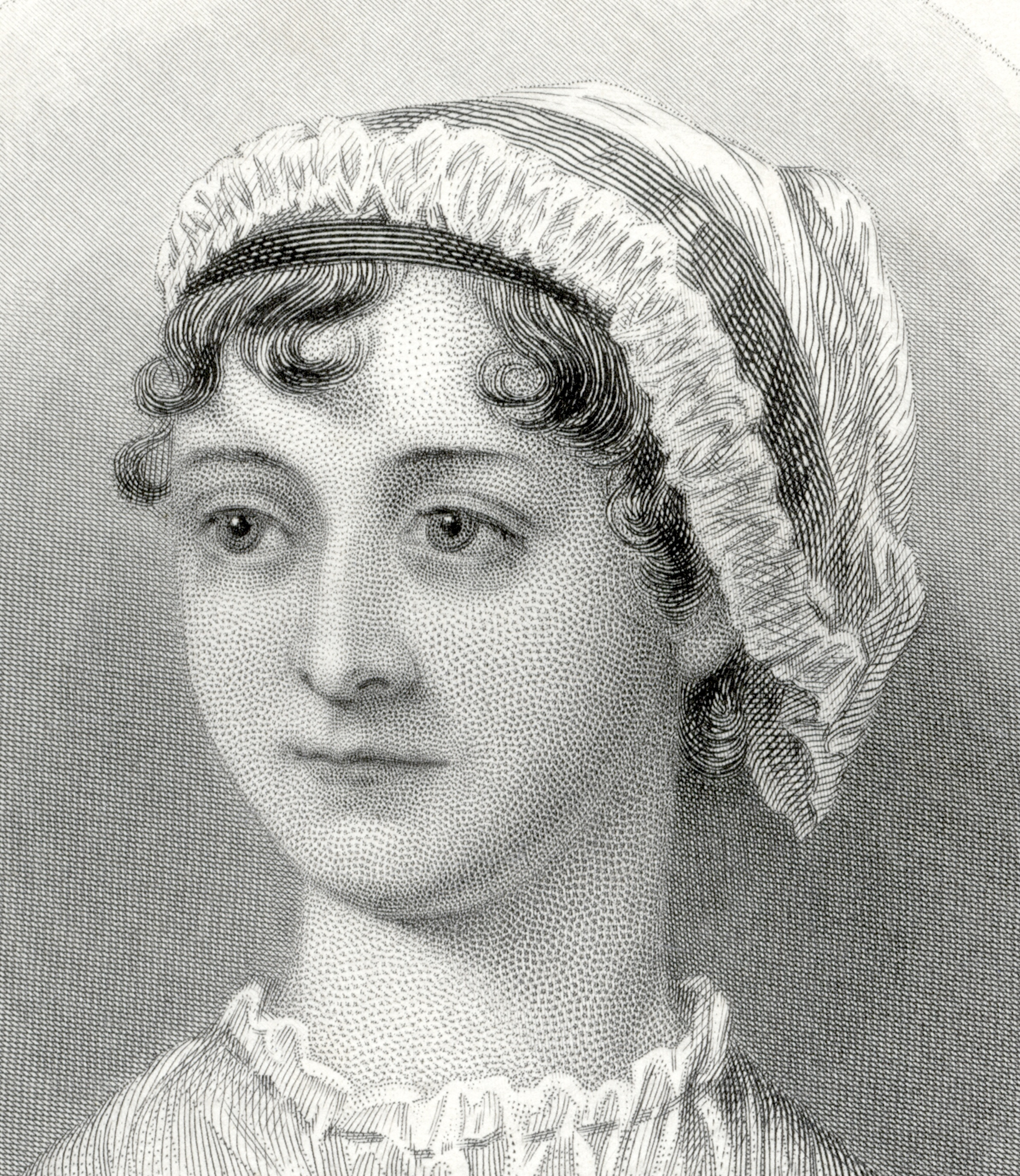
Thomas Leigh's descendants include Jane Austen

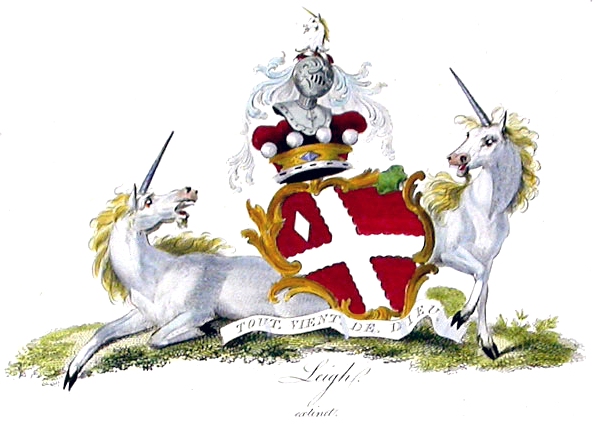
Arms of the Barons Leigh of Stoneleigh

Sir Thomas Leigh's descendants include Jane Austen through her mother Cassandra Leigh, the Leigh Baronets and the Barons Leigh of Stoneleigh, the Earls of Chichester and the Duchess of Dudley.

One of his daughters, Winifred Leigh, married a later Lord Mayor of London, George Bond.

Another, Katherine Leigh, married Edward Baber MP, Serjeant-at-law and Recorder of Bath.

== See also ==
- Leigh baronets
- Baron Leigh
- Earl of Chichester
- Duchess of Dudley

Civic offices
Preceded by Sir Thomas Curtis	Lord Mayor of London; 1558–1559	Succeeded by Sir William Hewett
