= Thomas Iden =

Sir Thomas Iden

Governor of Rochester Castle
- In office c. 1486 – 1506
- Preceded by: Thomas Cobham
- Succeeded by: John Marney

High Sheriff of Kent
- In office 1500–1500
- Preceded by: Sir Alexander Colepepper
- Succeeded by: Sir William Scott

Personal details
- Born: 1453 Westwell, Kent, England
- Died: 1512/1513
- Resting place: St. Mary's Churchyard, Westwell, England

Sir Thomas Iden (c. 1453 – 1512/1513) of Westwell was an English Lancastrian knight who fought at the Battle of Bosworth Field in 1485. He served as High Sheriff of Kent in 1500 as well as the Governor of Rochester Castle in the late 15th-century. He was the son of former High Sheriff and capturer of Jack Cade, Alexander Iden.

== Biography ==
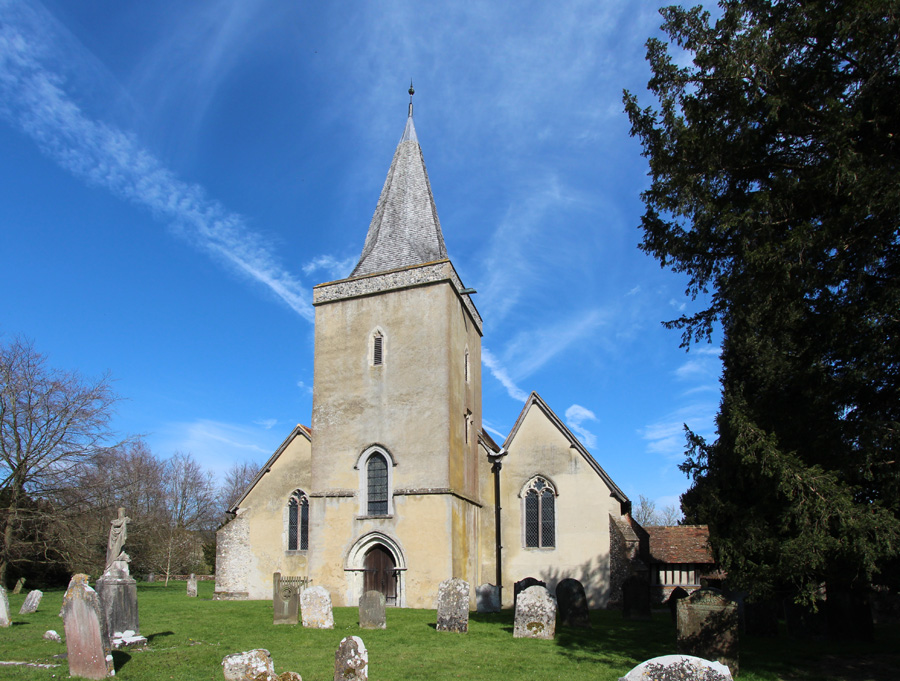
St Mary’s Church

Very little is known of Thomas' early years. However, it is known that he was born to Alexander Iden of Westwell and his mother Elizabeth Fiennes, daughter of James Fiennes, 1st Baron Saye and Sele, in 1453. This would be Elizabeth's second marriage as her father and husband William Cromer were both executed when Jack Cade's Rebellion broke out in 1450. Thomas was the brother of Joan Iden, born at an unknown date. His father would die shortly after his birth in 1457. His mother would remarry for the third time to future High Sheriff of Essex and Wiltshire Lawrence Raynsford in 1458. They would have a child named John in 1461, Thomas’ younger brother-in-law.

The facts surrounding Thomas’ immediate family are fragmented. However he is believed to have married a woman named Alicia, born c. 1450. Who is believed to be the daughter of Thomas Atwode of Canterbury. With her he had at least five children, four boys and a girl. The eldest, born c. 1475, Thomas named after his father. Despite this, Thomas was possibly never married and Alicia may have been wed to a man named Thomas Shedd, also born in 1453. However, this claim is unsubstantiated. Alicia is thought to have died in 1504.

Thomas would hold a handful of positions throughout his life as a strong Lancastrian ally. Including being the High Sheriff of Kent in the sixthteenth year of Henry VII reign. In addition to the Governor of Rochester Castle by 1486 until the near end or end of his life. The exact dates are unknown, the previous governor is thought to have been Thomas Cobham, 5th Baron Cobham who died in 1471. The position was likely gifted by Henry VII following the victory at Bosworth. Thomas' father was also previously the keeper of said castle.

Thomas is known to have died by 1513. His 1498 will stated he wished to be buried in the churchyard of St. Mary's in Westwell.
