= Alexander Iden =

High Sheriff of Kent

Sir Alexander Iden
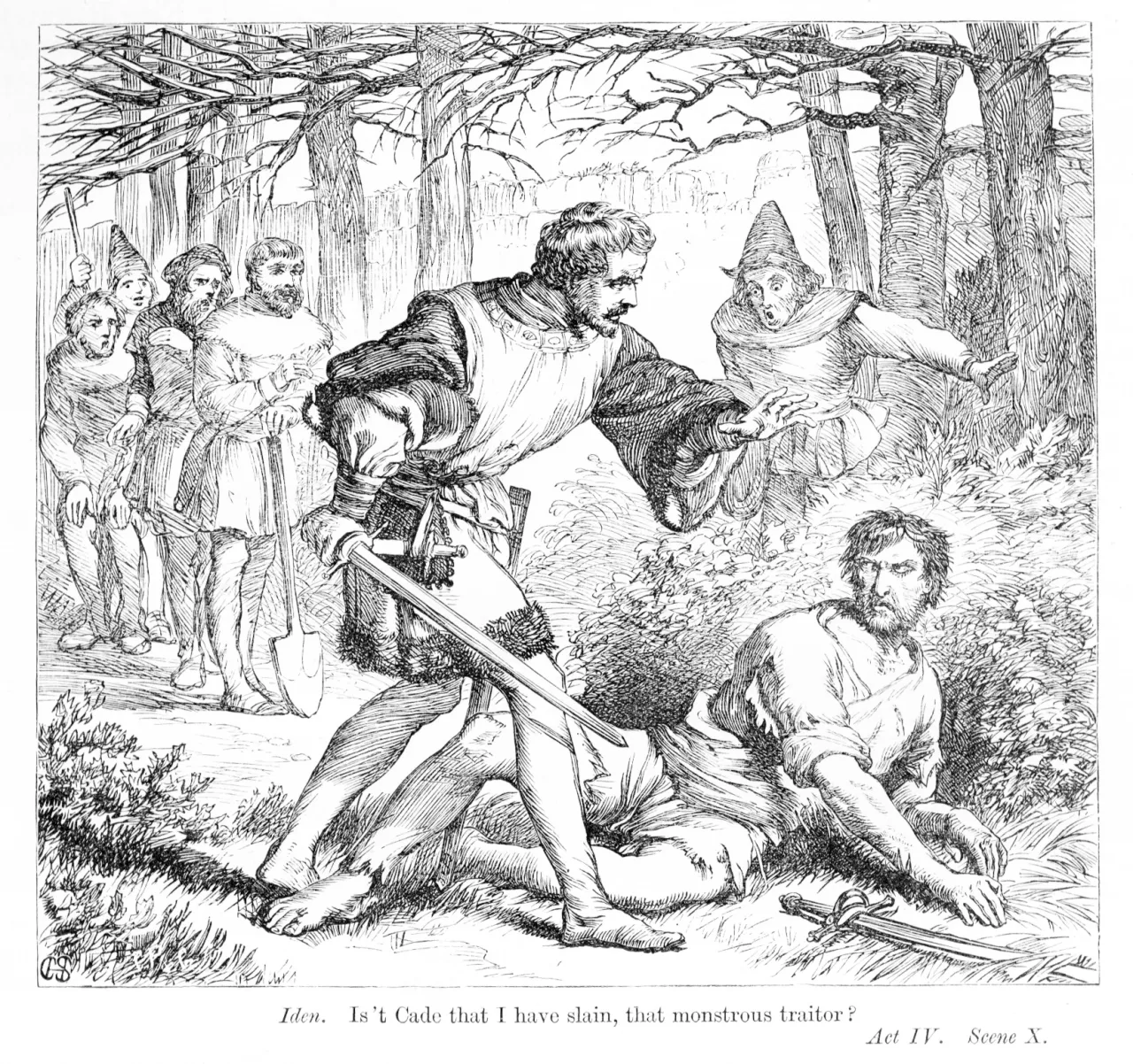
- A fictitious engraving of Alexander seen in the 1864–68 Plays of Shakespeare, vol. II.

High Sheriff of Kent
- In office 1456–1456
- Preceded by: Philip Belknap
- Succeeded by: John Guildford

Personal details
- Born: c. 1420 Westwell, Kent, England
- Died: 19 November 1457 London
- Resting place: St Martin Orgar, City of London

Sir Alexander Iden (c. 1420 – 19 November 1457) of Westwell was the High Sheriff of Kent in 1456. He is known for capturing Jack Cade, the leader of the 1450 rebellion in south-east England.

== Biography ==
Very little is known about Iden's early life; it is believed that he was the son of John Barnard Iden (c. 1400–1488) and his wife Helen. It is known that by late 1450 he was married to Elizabeth Fiennes, the daughter of James Fiennes and widow of William Cromer, both of whom had been killed in or near London on July 4 of that year when Jack Cade's Rebellion broke out. The couple had at least two children, a son Thomas in 1453 and a daughter Joan at an unknown date.

On 10 July 1450, Henry VI issued a proclamation offering 1,000 marks (equivalent to around 666 pounds) for Cade's capture, dead or alive; and five marks for anyone who played a part. It is said that Iden and his posse caught up with Cade on 12 July in Heathfield, East Sussex. It is written that the injuries Cade suffered during his capture were so severe that he died before the group could return to London on 15 July. Iden and the other men were given their respective rewards. Cade's corpse was decapitated at Newgate and his head was placed on London Bridge, facing Kent. His body was also quartered.

The rebellion was likely a precursor to the Wars of the Roses, which began in May 1455. It is unknown what side Iden may have taken during the early years of this conflict, as he died in 1457. However, it is plausible to assume that he would have later supported the House of York due to similar feelings amongst close members of his family by the 1460s. His brother-in-law William Fiennes became a knight who fought alongside Edward IV, dying at the Battle of Barnet in 1471. However, this theory could be false as it is known that by the late 15th-century his son Thomas had become a strong Lancastrian ally. Even fighting at the Battle of Bosworth Field in 1485. Iden took the position of High Sheriff of Kent in 1456. He died the following year on 19 November. His wife Elizabeth married a third time after his death, to Sir Lawrence Raynsford, who was later High Sheriff of Essex in 1465 and High Sheriff of Wiltshire in 1470.

== Popular media ==
It is a common misconception that Iden killed Cade immediately upon finding him. This version of events was likely made popular by William Shakespeare's 1591 historical play, Henry VI, Part 2.

This false history was used in the 1963 theatrical adaptation The Wars of the Roses and the subsequent BBC television mini-series that aired in 1965–66, where Iden is played by Malcolm Webster and Cade by Roy Dotrice.
