= William Fiennes, 2nd Baron Saye and Sele =

The Right Honourable The Lord Saye and Sele
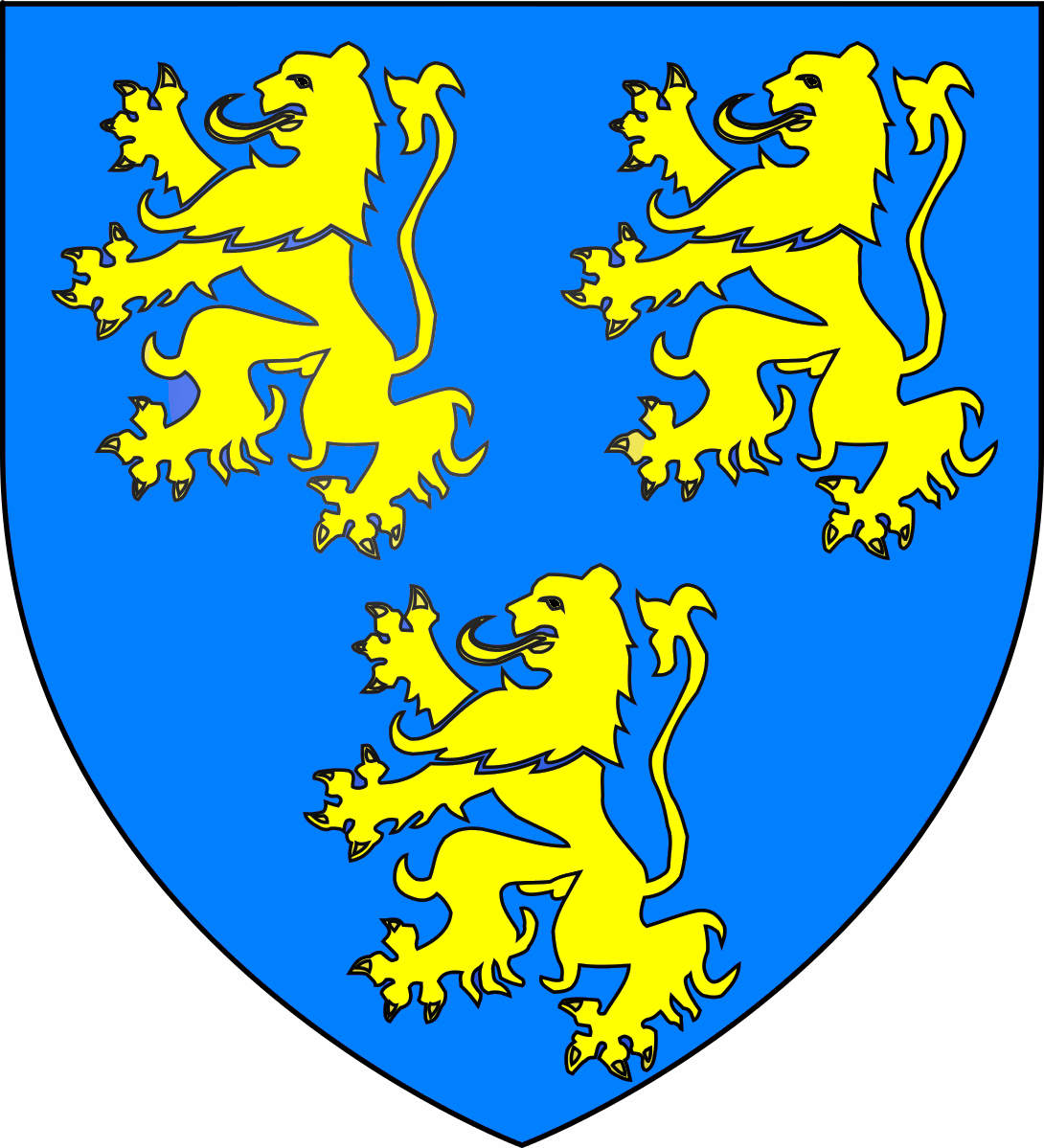
- Arms of Fiennes, Baron Saye and Sele: Azure, three lions rampant

Baron Saye and Sele
- In office 4 July, 1450 – 14 April, 1471
- Preceded by: James Fiennes
- Succeeded by: Henry Fiennes, de jure

Personal details
- Born: c. 1428 Broughton Castle, Oxfordshire, England
- Died: 14 April 1471 Barnet, Hertfordshire, England
- Resting place: St Thomas' Church, Southwark, England

William Fiennes, 2nd Baron Saye and Sele (c. 1428 – 14 April 1471) was an English nobleman who took part of the Wars of the Roses. The son of James Fiennes, 1st Baron Saye and Sele, he succeeded to the barony when his father was killed by Jack Cade's rebellion in 1450. William took the side of Edward IV, whom he served loyally, and was killed fighting for him in the Battle of Barnet in 1471.

William Fiennes was born in about 1428, the only son of James Fiennes, 1st Baron Saye and Sele.

Before 1450, he had been made a knight of the body to Henry VI of England. He succeeded his father as Baron Saye and Sele in July of that year, when the latter was captured by Jack Cade and beheaded in London after a show trial. In 1450, his sister Elizabeth was remarried to the capturer of Jack Cade himself, making Alexander Iden William's brother-in-law. In 1451, he joined the expedition of Lord Rivers to defend the Pale of Calais. He was appointed to the Privy Council in March of 1453/4, and served in various local offices, mostly in Kent and Southampton.

Lord Saye adopted the Yorkist cause and fought on that side at the Battle of Northampton. In 1461, after the accession of Edward IV, he was appointed Constable of Portchester Castle and Keeper of the New Forest. In 1462, he was appointed Vice-Admiral of England, as deputy to the Earl of Warwick. During Warwick's rebellion and the readeption of Henry VI, he accompanied Edward IV into exile in Burgundy in 1470. He returned with that king to England the following year and was killed fighting for him at the Battle of Barnet.

Lord Saye was forced to sell or mortgage much of his estate, having twice had to ransom himself after being taken prisoner. By his wife Margaret (d. 1477), daughter of William Wykeham or Perrott of Broughton Castle, he had two sons, Richard and Henry. Henry survived him, but was never summoned to Parliament, although he did adopt the title of Lord Saye.

Peerage of England
Preceded by James Fiennes	Baron Saye and Sele; 4 July, 1450–1471	Succeeded by Henry Fiennes
