= Governor of Rochester Castle =

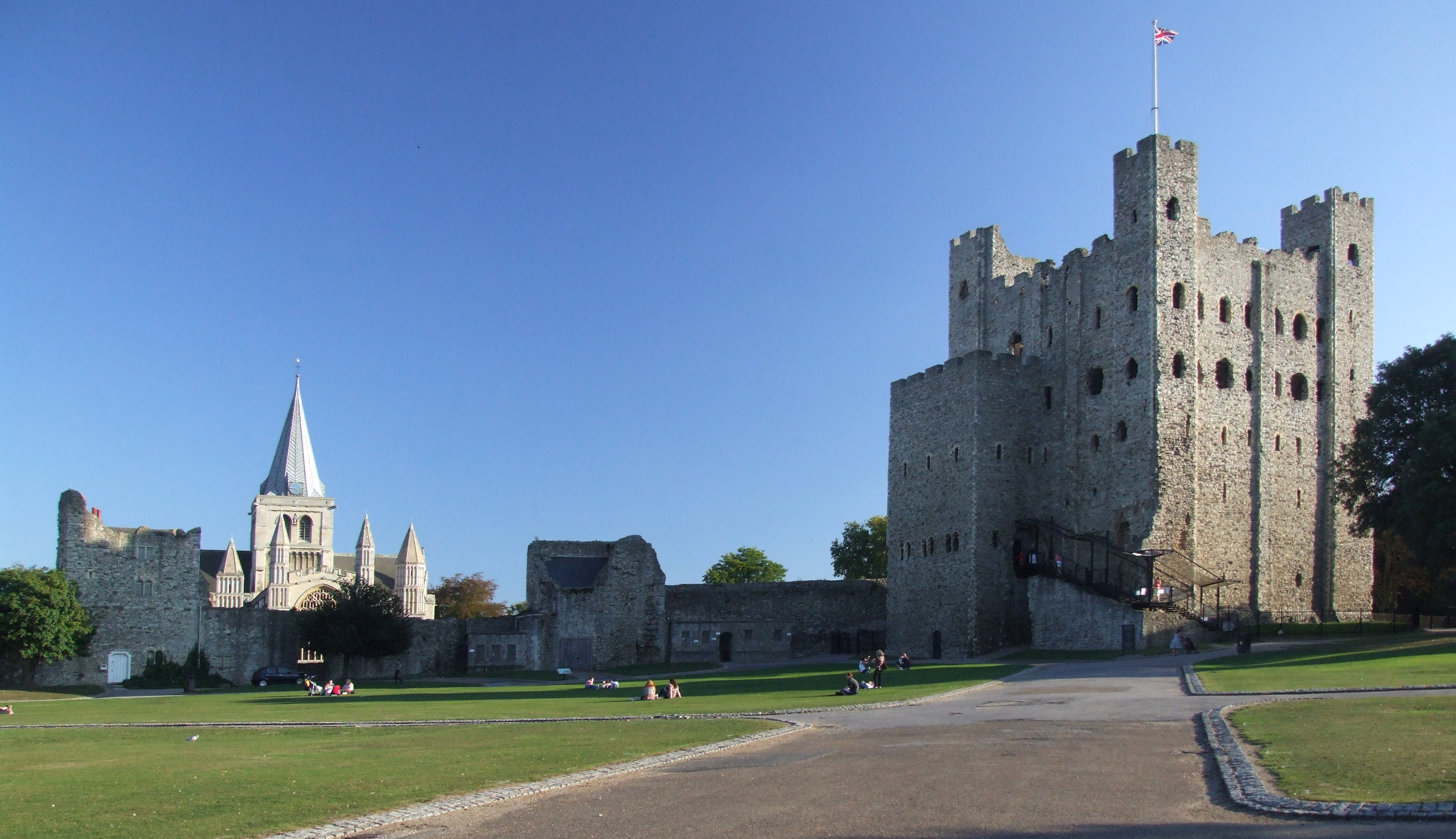
Rochester Castle

The Governor of Rochester Castle commanded the important castle at Rochester in Kent, England which dominated the Medway estuary and Watling Street. After being badly damaged during the Barons' Wars the castle was completely renovated by King Henry III and put under the control of a series of Governors responsible for its upkeep and security.

== List of governors ==
Source (unless stated otherwise):

- c.1215 William de Albini
- 1228–1232 Hubert de Burgh, 1st Earl of Kent
- 1232–1236 Stephen de Segrave
- 1236–1258 John de Cobham (elder)
- 1258–1260 Nicholas de Moels
- 1260–1261 William de Saye
- 1261– Robert Walerand
- 1264 Roger de Leybourne
- 1264–1264 William Sinclair (died 1264)
- 1266 Simon Morlac (Deputy?)
- 1270– Bertram de Crioll (younger)
- –1274 Robert de Hougham (died 1274)
- 1275– Robert de Septuans
- 1280–1300 John de Cobham (younger)
- 1304 Stephen de Dene
- 1328 Will Skarlett
- 1344– Sir John de Cobham, Lord Cobham
- 1360– John Grey, 3rd Baron Grey of Codnor
- 1376 Simon de Burgh
- 1378– John de Newenton
- –1389 William Criol
- 1395–?1400 Sir William Arundel
- 1400–1413 Richard Arundel
- 1413–1472 Thomas Lord Cobham
- 1486–?1506 Sir Thomas Iden
- 1509–?1525 Sir John Marney (died 1525)
- 1525–1559 Sir Thomas Cheyney
- 16nn–166n Jonathan Atkins
- 1663–1668 John Middleton, 1st Earl of Middleton
