= Listed buildings in Westwell, Kent =

Civil Parish in Kent, England

Westwell is a village and civil parish in the Borough of Ashford of Kent, England. It contains one grade I, one grade II* and 33 grade II listed buildings that are recorded in the National Heritage List for England.

This list is based on the information retrieved online from Historic England.

== Key ==
Grade	Criteria
I	Buildings that are of exceptional interest
II*	Particularly important buildings of more than special interest
II	Buildings that are of special interest

== Listing ==
Name	Grade	Location	Type	Completed (Note: The date given is the date used by Historic England as significant for the initial building or that of an important part in the structure's description.)	Date designated	Grid ref. (Note: The grid reference is based on the British national grid reference system, sometimes known as OSGB36, used by the Ordnance Survey.) Geo-coordinates	Notes	Entry number (Note: The "List Entry Number" is a unique number assigned to each listed building and scheduled monument by Historic England.)	Image	Wikidata
Barn to South of Park House	II	Charing Lane			10 October 1980	TQ9833947295; 51°11′26″N 0°50′13″E		1071335	Upload Photo	Q26326454
Digges Court	II*	Charing Lane			10 October 1980	TQ9732447780; 51°11′43″N 0°49′22″E		1071333	Upload Photo	Q17556180
Lacton Manor	II	Charing Lane			14 February 1967	TQ9717948044; 51°11′51″N 0°49′15″E		1362715	Upload Photo	Q26644586
Park House	II	Charing Lane			14 February 1967	TQ9836847366; 51°11′28″N 0°50′15″E		1071334	Upload Photo	Q26326452
Outbuilding at Court Lodge Farm with North and East Facing Flint Walls	II	Eastwell Lane			16 September 1985	TQ9907647386; 51°11′28″N 0°50′51″E		1221345	Upload Photo	Q26515743
Periton Court	II	Eastwell Lane			14 February 1967	TQ9919547367; 51°11′27″N 0°50′57″E		1071336	Upload Photo	Q26326455
Shoddington Cottages	II	Eastwell Lane			14 February 1967	TQ9977446730; 51°11′06″N 0°51′26″E		1356194	Upload Photo	Q26638882
The Mill House	II	Eastwell Lane			14 February 1967	TQ9917147411; 51°11′28″N 0°50′56″E		1362716	Upload Photo	Q26644587
Castle Farmhouse	II	Kingsland Lane			10 October 1980	TQ9966645983; 51°10′42″N 0°51′19″E		1362717	Upload Photo	Q26644588
Elvy Cottage	II	Kingsland Lane			10 October 1980	TQ9946146160; 51°10′48″N 0°51′09″E		1071337	Upload Photo	Q26326457
Kingsland	II	Kingsland Lane			10 October 1980	TQ9956745517; 51°10′27″N 0°51′13″E		1068635	Upload Photo	Q26321336
Former Wool Pack Inn	II	Maidstone Road, TN26 1AP, Hothfield Common			10 October 1980	TQ9700046606; 51°11′05″N 0°49′03″E		1071338	Upload Photo	Q26326458
Hothfield Mill	II	Maidstone Road, Potters Corner			14 February 1967	TQ9887245014; 51°10′11″N 0°50′36″E		1362662	Upload Photo	Q26644537
Mill House at Hothfield Mill	II	Maidstone Road, Potters Corner			10 October 1980	TQ9888444996; 51°10′11″N 0°50′37″E		1071457	Upload Photo	Q26326626
Ripple Court	II	Maidstone Road			14 February 1967	TQ9769245882; 51°10′41″N 0°49′37″E		1068661	Upload Photo	Q26321359
The Harven	II	Maidstone Road			17 September 1952	TQ9787545631; 51°10′32″N 0°49′46″E		1068670	Upload Photo	Q26321368
The Old Parsonage Farmhouse	II	Maidstone Road			17 September 1952	TQ9810446050; 51°10′46″N 0°49′59″E		1362719	Upload Photo	Q26644590
Dunn Street Farmhouse	II	Pilgrims Way			10 October 1980	TQ9908948022; 51°11′48″N 0°50′53″E		1071339	Upload Photo	Q26326460
Woodside Cottages	II	Sandyhurst Lane			4 June 1976	TQ9919344825; 51°10′05″N 0°50′52″E		1362848	Upload Photo	Q26644711
Church of St Mary	I	The Street			14 February 1967	TQ9906247483; 51°11′31″N 0°50′51″E		1068690	Church of St Mary More images	Q17529215
Court Lodge	II	1 and 2, The Street			10 October 1980	TQ9908547448; 51°11′30″N 0°50′52″E		1068722	Upload Photo	Q26321417
Oasthouse in Grounds of Court Lodge to East of House	II	The Street			10 October 1980	TQ9911047451; 51°11′30″N 0°50′53″E		1071341	Oasthouse in Grounds of Court Lodge to East of House More images	Q26326463
Swinford Cottage	II	The Street			10 October 1980	TQ9901247487; 51°11′31″N 0°50′48″E		1071340	Upload Photo	Q26326461
The Downings	II	The Street			10 October 1980	TQ9906047140; 51°11′20″N 0°50′50″E		1068738	Upload Photo	Q26321433
The Old Tithe Barn	II	The Street			10 October 1980	TQ9893347321; 51°11′26″N 0°50′44″E		1362721	Upload Photo	Q26644592
White House Court	II	The Street, TN25 4LQ			14 February 1967	TQ9893947334; 51°11′26″N 0°50′44″E		1068731	Upload Photo	Q26321426
4,5,6 and 7, Tutt Hill Lane	II	4, 5, 6 and 7, Tutt Hill Lane, Tutt Hill			10 October 1980	TQ9716546589; 51°11′04″N 0°49′11″E		1071342	Upload Photo	Q26326464
Tutt Hill Farmhouse	II	Tutt Hill Lane, Tutt Hill			10 October 1980	TQ9725346642; 51°11′06″N 0°49′16″E		1068745	Upload Photo	Q26321439
Croucher's Farmhouse	II	Westwell Lane			14 February 1967	TQ9933345454; 51°10′25″N 0°51′01″E		1071344	Upload Photo	Q26326467
Crouchers Manor Barn	II	Westwell Lane, TN254JN			10 October 1980	TQ9931145450; 51°10′25″N 0°50′59″E		1071345	Upload Photo	Q26326469
Dignash Cottages	II	Westwell Lane			10 October 1980	TQ9912246855; 51°11′10″N 0°50′53″E		1362722	Upload Photo	Q26644593
Malthouse Cottages	II	Westwell Lane			10 October 1980	TQ9912546833; 51°11′10″N 0°50′53″E		1356130	Upload Photo	Q26638825
Nash Court	II	Westwell Lane			17 September 1952	TQ9882446478; 51°10′59″N 0°50′36″E		1071343	Upload Photo	Q26326466
Studhams	II	Westwell Lane			10 October 1980	TQ9904046392; 51°10′56″N 0°50′47″E		1356136	Upload Photo	Q26638831

== See also ==
- Grade I listed buildings in Kent
- Grade II* listed buildings in Kent

== Sources ==
- Newman, John (2012) [1969], Kent: West and the Weald, The Buildings of England, New Haven and London: Yale University Press, ISBN 978-0-300-18509-6
