= James Fiennes, 1st Baron Saye and Sele =

15th-century English soldier and politician

The Right Honourable The Lord Saye and Sele
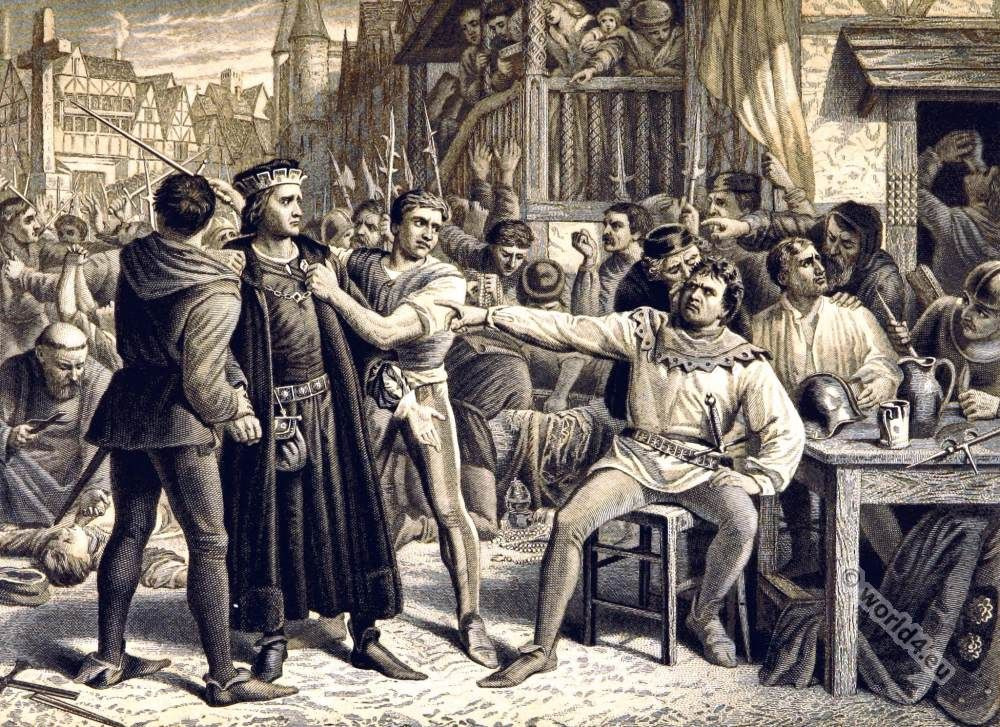
- Fiennes being brought before Jack Cade on 4 July 1450

High Sheriff of Kent
- In office 1436–1436
- Preceded by: William Manston
- Succeeded by: Richard Waller

Baron Saye and Sele
- In office 1447 – 4 July 1450
- Preceded by: Baronage established
- Succeeded by: William Fiennes

Lord High Treasurer
- In office 16 September 1449 – 22 June 1450
- Preceded by: Marmaduke Lumley
- Succeeded by: John Beauchamp

Personal details
- Born: 22 September 1395 Herstmonceux, East Sussex, England
- Died: 4 July 1450 (aged 54) London, Middlesex, England
- Resting place: Christ Church Greyfriars, City of London, England

James Fiennes, 1st Baron Saye and Sele (22 September 1395 – 4 July 1450), was an English soldier and politician. He was born at Herstmonceux, Sussex, the second son of Sir William Fiennes (1 August 1357 – 18 January 1402) and his wife Elizabeth Batisford (Wartling, Sussex, 1363 – Herstmonceux, 18 January 1405).

Fiennes fought in the Hundred Years' War and served as High Sheriff of Kent in 1436 and High Sheriff of Surrey and Sussex in 1438. He was Constable of Dover Castle and Warden of the Cinque Ports from 1447 to 1450, and Lord High Treasurer of England from 1449 to 1450. Fiennes' tenure as Lord High Treasurer occurred during the Great Bullion Famine and the Great Slump in England.

He was summoned to Parliament from 1446 to 1449 and is said to have been created Baron Saye and Sele by letters patent in 1447. Saye and Sele was a supporter of William de la Pole, 1st Duke of Suffolk, the principal power behind the throne of Henry VI.

After Suffolk's deposition and murder in 1450, Fiennes was imprisoned in the Tower with his son-in-law William Cromer, deputy-sheriff of Kent in 1444. Having been released from the tower and handed over to the rebels as a placatory gesture by the king, Baron Saye was brought to Guildhall for a sham trial. Upon being found guilty of treason, he was paraded through part of London and beheaded by a mob of the rebels in London under Jack Cade at the Standard in Cheapside on 4 July 1450.

His son-in-law was also executed by the rebels outside the city walls on the same day. The heads of the two men were put on pikes and unceremoniously paraded through the streets of London while their bearers pushed them together so that they appeared to kiss. Fiennes was subsequently buried in the Franciscan church at Newgate. Shortly after the burial, English settlers dispossessed from their property in Bayeux and Caen (who had recently arrived in London) removed his coat of arms from the pillar by his grave and reversed it—an act intended to dishonour the dead. He was succeeded in the barony by his son William.

== Ancestry ==
Sir John Fiennes
Sir William Fiennes
Maud Monceaux
Sir William Fiennes
Geoffrey Saye, 2nd Baron Saye
Joan Saye
Maud Beauchamp
James Fiennes
John Batsford
Sir William Batsford
Elizabeth Batsford
Simon Peplesham
Margaret Peplesham
Joan Rowse

== Family and legacy ==
He married twice. His first wife was Joan, whose family name is uncertain, and their children were:

- Elizabeth (died 1475), who married three times. First, her stepmother's brother William Cromer (died 1450), of Tunstall, murdered like her father by Jack Cade's rebels; secondly, Alexander Iden, of Westwell, Jack Cade's capturer; lastly, Sir Lawrence Raynsford (died 1490). Both her first two husbands had been a High Sheriff of Kent and her last was a High Sheriff of Essex and of Wiltshire.
- William (born about 1428), who became 2nd Baron Saye and Sele and was killed in 1471 during the Battle of Barnet.

Before 1441, he married as second wife Emmeline (died 5 January 1452), daughter of Sir William Cromer, twice Lord Mayor of London. They may have had two daughters.

Fiennes appears as a named character in the play Henry VI, Part 2 by William Shakespeare, while the Battle of Barnet at which his son William died is referenced in the next play of the trilogy, Henry VI, Part 3.

His elder brother, Roger Fiennes (1384–1449), married Elizabeth Holland (daughter of John Holland (Duke of Exeter, half-brother of Richard II, son of Thomas Holland and Joan "the fair" of Kent) and Elizabeth of Lancaster (daughter of John of Gaunt and Blanche of Lancaster)).

Honorary titles
Preceded by The Duke of Gloucester	Lord Warden of the Cinque Ports; 1447–1450	Succeeded by The Duke of Buckingham
Political offices
Preceded by Marmaduke Lumley	Lord High Treasurer; 1449–1450	Succeeded by The Lord Beauchamp of Powick
Preceded by The Lord Sudeley	Lord Chamberlain; 1447–1450	Succeeded by The Lord Cromwell
Peerage of England
New creation	Baron Saye and Sele; 1447–1450	Succeeded by William Fiennes
