= Jonathan Atkins =

Former Governor of Barbados

Sir Jonathan Atkins
- Born: c. 1610
- Died: 1703; East Riding of Yorkshire, England
- Monuments: St Elthelburga's Church, Great Givendale
- Occupations: Governor of Barbados
- Years active: 1674–1680
- Predecessor: William Willoughby
- Successor: Richard Dutton
- Spouse: Elizabeth Anderson

Sir Jonathan Atkins (c. 1610–1703) was Governor of Guernsey and Governor of Barbados.

Commissioned into the 1st Foot Guards he was promoted to colonel and served in the Carlisle garrison, becoming Governor of Rochester Castle and then of Guernsey (1665–1670).

On 6 February 1674 he was commissioned Governor-in-Chief of Barbados, receiving his instructions on 28 February 1674. He arrived in Barbados late October or early November 1674. The hurricane of 31 August 1675 was '... the worſt Enemy this Iſland ever knew, ...'. Atkins was recalled and replaced by Sir Richard Dutton in 1680 who 'found the Iſland in a very flourſhing Condition'.

Atkins married Mary Howard, the eldest daughter of Sir William Howard and Mary Eure of Naworth Castle, on 17 November 1642. She died on 9 April 1660. At the age of 51 on 8 October 1661, Atkins married the c. 24-year-old widow, Elizabeth Anderson, daughter of Sir John Baker of Sissinghurst in Kent.

On his death his estates were divided between his second son, Richard and his third son, John.

== Bibliography ==
- Hoare, Peter (2010). "Sir Jonathan Atkins - Holborn House, Barbados - The marble relief of King's Lynn, Norfolk (1687): A puzzling link?". Norfolk Archaeology. XLVI: 48–62.
- Oldmixon, J (1741). The British empire in America Vol 2. London: J. Brotherton, J. Clarke, A. Ward, J. Clarke, C. Hitch [and 5 others].
- Sainsbury, W N (1889). "America and West Indies: February 1674". Calendar of State Papers Colonial, America and West Indies, Volume 7: 1669-1674. Institute of Historical Research.
- Schomburgk, R H (1847). The History of Barbados: Comprising a Geographical and Statistical Description of the Island; a Sketch of the Historical Events Since the Settlement; and an Account of Its Geology and Natural Productions. Republished 2010 Cambridge University Press. ISBN 978-1-108-02331-3.
