= St Martin Orgar =

Coordinates: 51°30′38.98″N 0°5′15.10″W

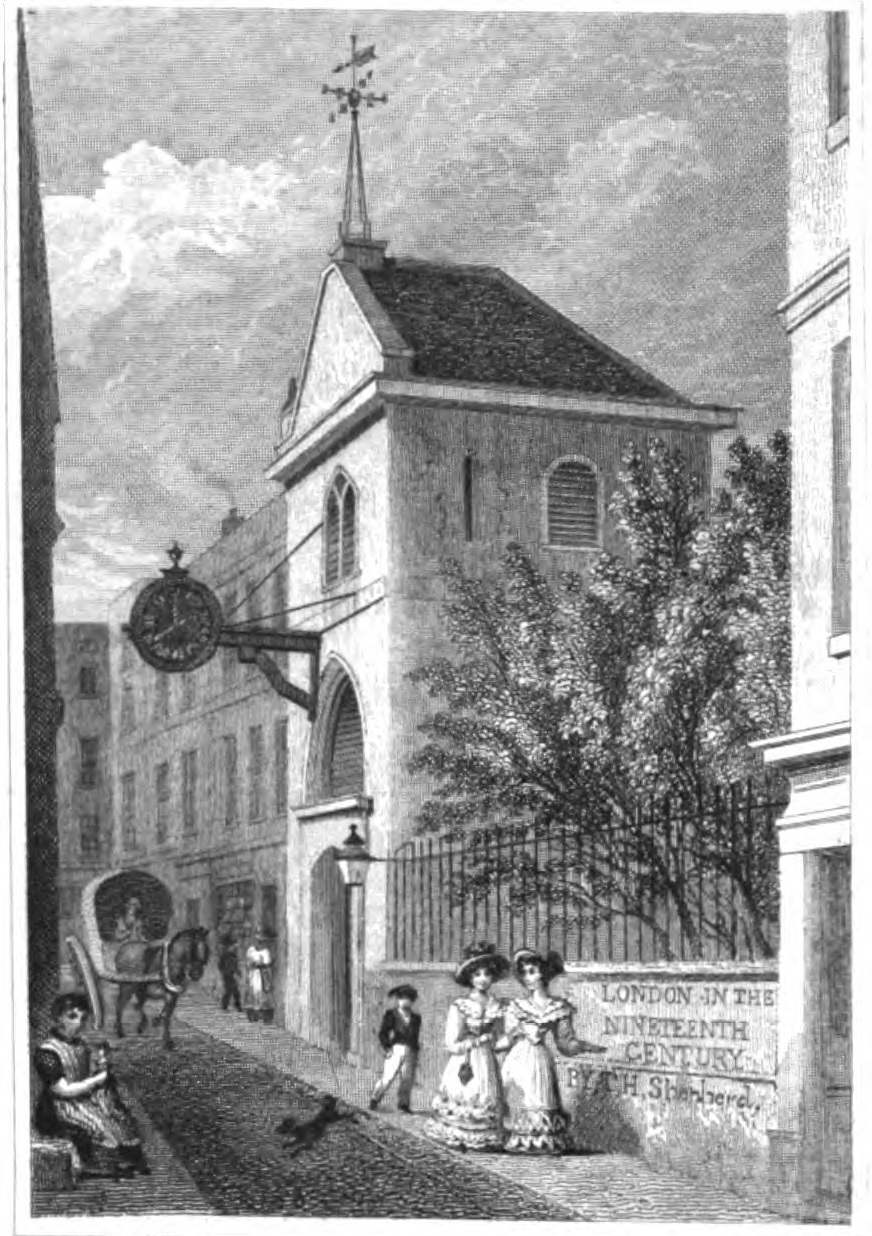
- St Martin Orgar depicted by Thomas H. Shepherd in 1831

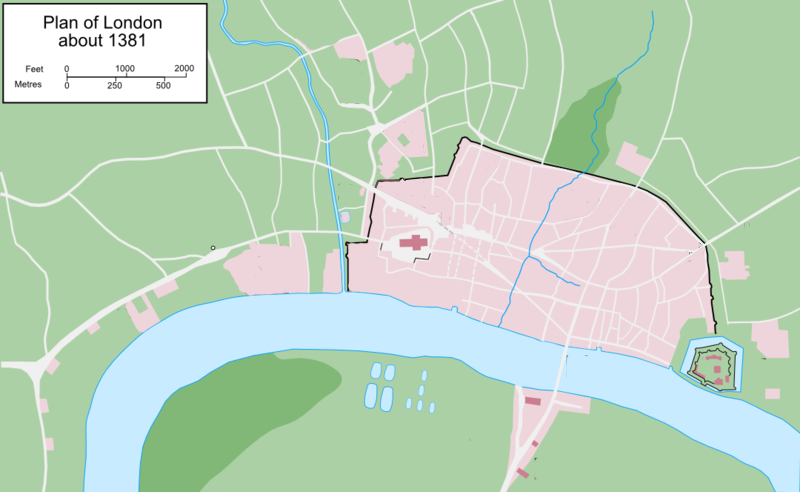
- Location: London
- Country: England
- Denomination: Anglican

History
- Dedication: Martin of Tours

Architecture
- Demolished: 1820

St Martin Orgar was a church in the City of London in Martin Lane, off Cannon Street. Its name is said to derive from one Ordgarus (Odgarus, Orgarus, Ordgar, Orgar), a Dane who donated the church to the canons of St Paul’s.

It is sometimes considered being one of the churches mentioned in the nursery rhyme "Oranges and Lemons". Most of the building was destroyed in the Great Fire of London in 1666, but the tower and part of the nave were left standing. The parish was merged with St Clement Eastcheap. The churchyard remained in use by the combined parish until 1853.

The remains of the church were restored and used by French Protestants until 1820. Most of the remaining building was then pulled down, but the tower remained and was rebuilt in 1851 as the campanile of St Clement Eastcheap. A fragment of the churchyard of St Martin's remains to the south of the campanile.

At least 17 people have been identified to be buried in the churchyard. Including but not limited to:

- Alexander Iden
- Allan Cotton
- William Hewett and family.
- William Cromer
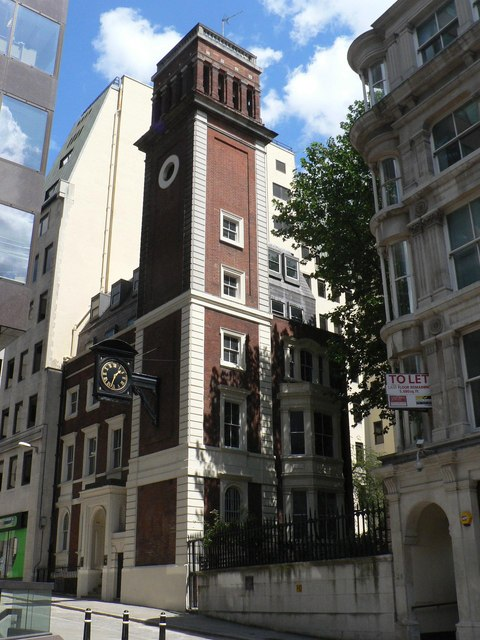
29 Martin Lane, built on the site of St Martin Orgar in 1853

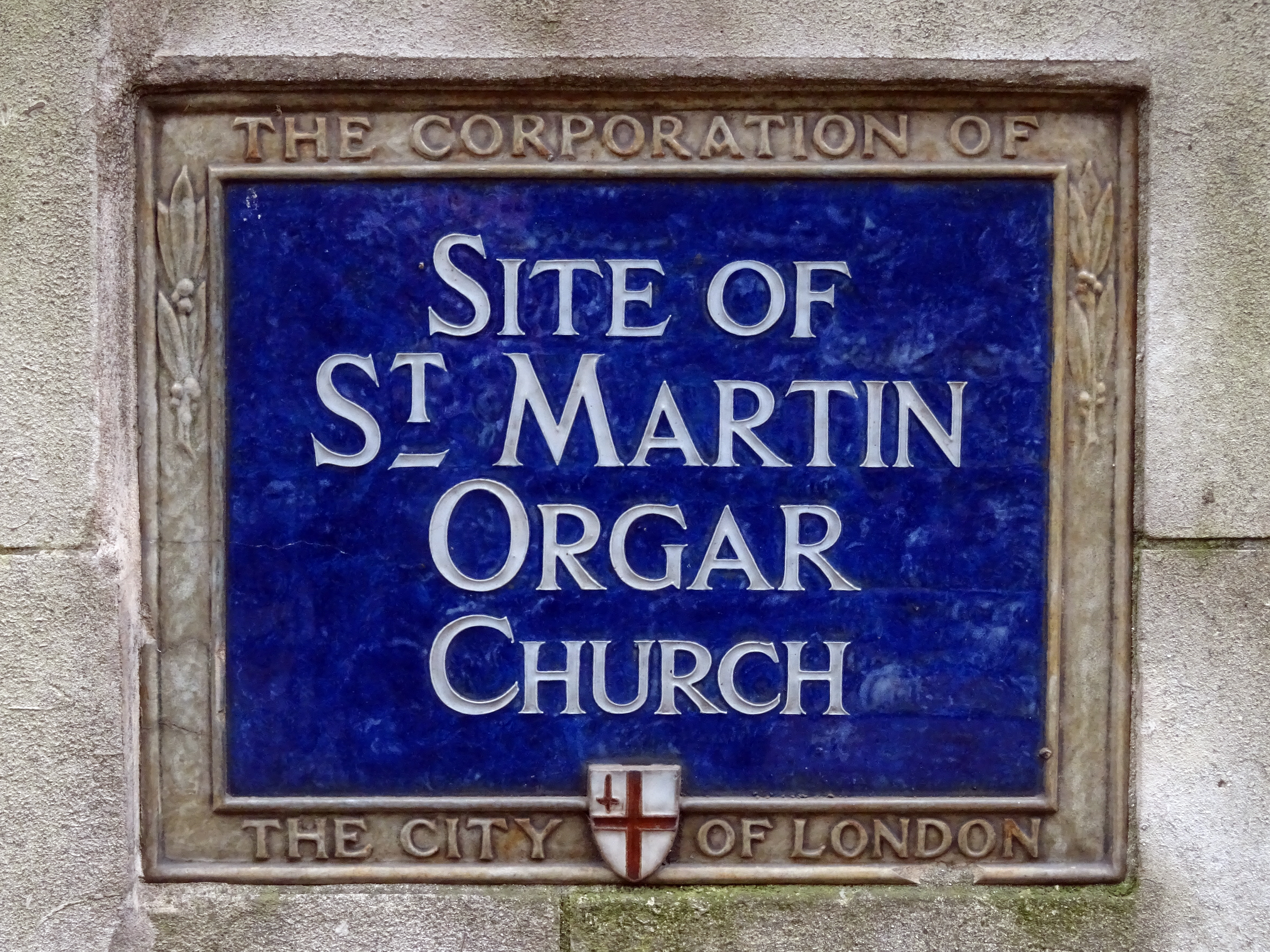
Blue plaque
