= Lawrence Raynsford =

15th-century English sheriff

Sir Lawrence Raynsford

High Sheriff of Essex
- In office 1465–1465
- Preceded by: Roger Ree
- Succeeded by: Henry Barley

High Sheriff of Wiltshire
- In office 1470–1470
- Preceded by: Sir George Darell
- Succeeded by: Sir Roger Tocotes

Personal details
- Born: c. 1419 Alpheton, Suffolk, England
- Died: 18 September 1490
- Resting place: St John's Abbey, Colchester, England

Sir Lawrence Raynsford (c. 1419 – 18 September 1490) was an Englishman who served as the High Sheriff of Essex in 1465 and High Sheriff of Wiltshire in 1470. He was additionally a Knight of Colchester.

== Biography ==
Little is known of the early years of Lawrence's life, but it is known that he was born c. 1419 to William Raynsford Esq (1395–1434) and Eleanor Brokesbourne, the daughter of Essex politician Edmund Brokesbourne. William and Eleanor are known to have been first cousins. Following his mother's death in late 1428, Lawrence's father presented a petition to Pope Martin V to absolve himself of excommunication due to the circumstance of his former marriage. The pope permitted William to remarry and declared Lawrence to be his legitimate son. However it is not known if William remmaried prior to his death.

Lawrence would first marry Elizabeth Fiennes, by 1458. This would be Elizabeth's third marriage as her father James Fiennes, 1st Baron Saye and Sele and first husband William Cromer were executed during Jack Cade's Rebellion in 1450, and her second husband Alexander Iden, the man who captured Jack Cade, had died in 1457.

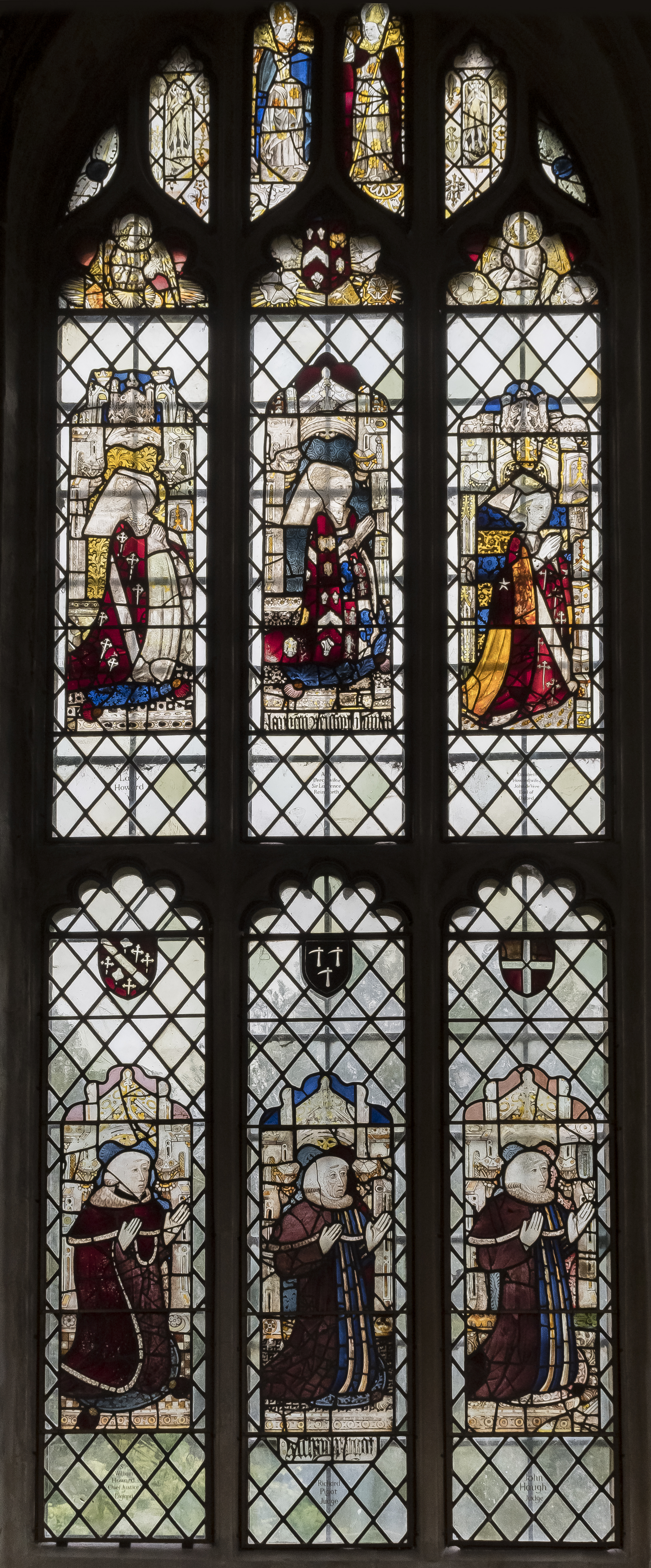
Late 15th-century stained glass in the Church of the Holy Trinity, Long Melford, Suffolk. Anne Percy can be seen in the centre of the upper lights, her name and "Sir Laurence Reinsforth" are inscribed below.

The couple would go on to have one son, John, in 1461. The date of Elizabeth's death is unknown, though it is believed to have been by 1470 in Herstmonceux, East Sussex. Lawrence would marry a second time to Anne Percy, the daughter of Henry Percy, 2nd Earl of Northumberland, that same year. This would also be Anne's second marriage as she was formerly wed to Thomas Hungerford of Rowden in 1460. Thomas was executed in 1469 after being charged with involvement in a Lancastrian conspiracy to restore Henry VI. Lawrence and Anne are believed to have had a child but this has not been confirmed.

Lawrence would later rise to the position of High Sheriff of Essex in 1465 and High Sheriff of Wiltshire in 1470. He died on 18 September 1490, his son John being the heir to his lands, including the Essex manors of Nether Hall and Bradfield Hall. This also included property in Dedham, Ramsey, Mistley, and Colchester. His wife Anne would marry a third time to Hugh Vaughan by 1493. She died in 1522 in Westminster and was buried in the Church of St Margaret in Westminster Abbey.
