= Jack Cade's Rebellion =

Popular revolt in England, 1450

Cade's Rebellion
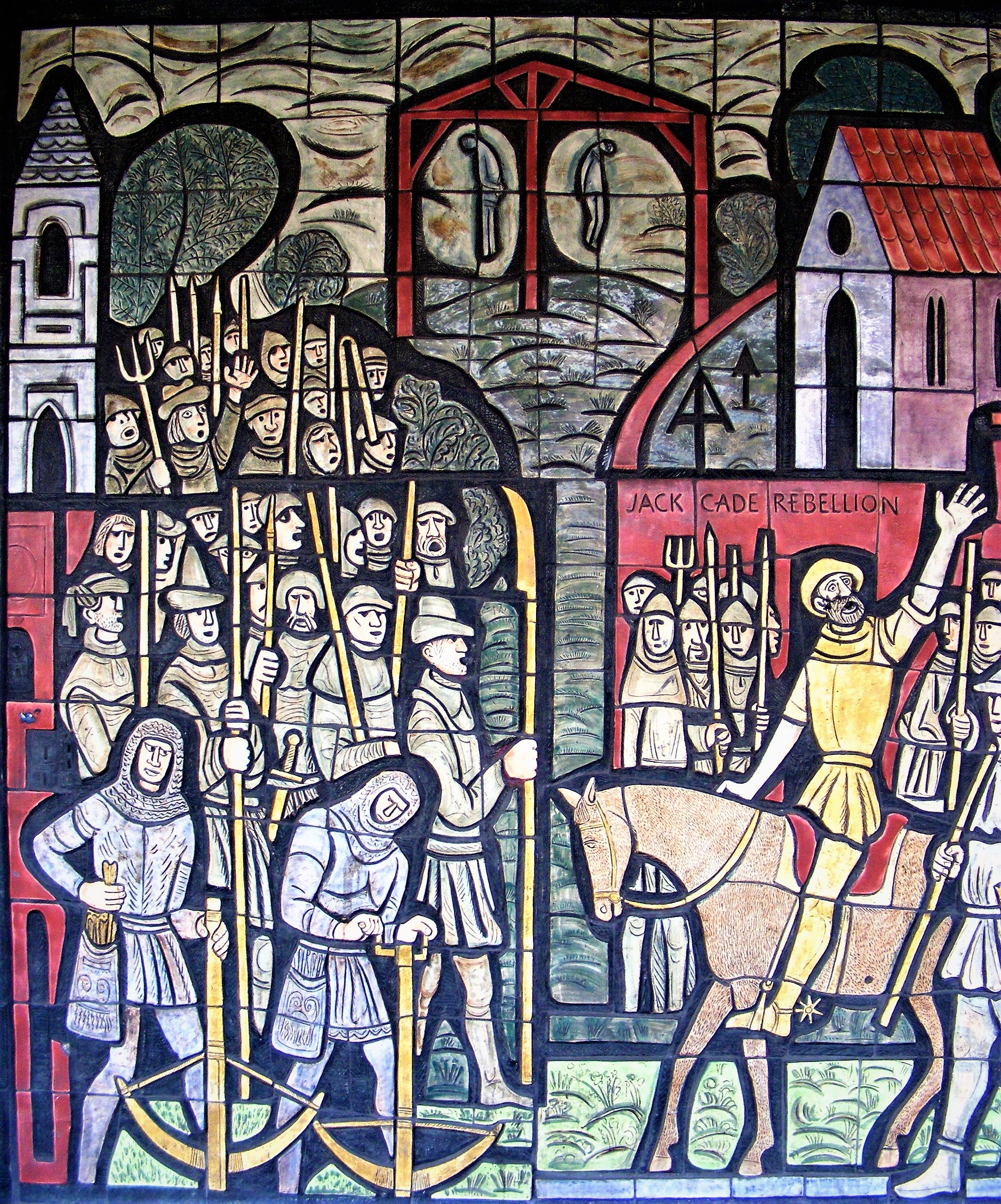
- Jack Cade's Rebellion, depicted in a mural of the history of the Old Kent Road (1965) by Adam Kossowski
- Date: May–July 1450
- Location: South-east England
- Result: Royal victory

Parties
Kingdom of England; City of London	Jack Cade's rebels

Lead figures
King Henry VI	Jack Cade †

Casualties and losses
40 London citizens	200 rebels

Jack Cade's Rebellion or Cade's Rebellion was a popular revolt in 1450 against the government of England, which took place in South East England between the months of April and July. It stemmed from local grievances regarding the corruption, maladministration and abuse of power of the king's closest advisors and local officials, as well as recent military losses in France during the Hundred Years' War. Leading an army of men from South East England, Jack Cade marched on London in order to force the government to reform the administration and remove from power the "traitors" deemed responsible for bad governance. Apart from the Cornish rebellion of 1497, it was the largest popular uprising to take place in England during the 15th century.

Despite Cade's attempt to keep his men under control, once the rebel forces had entered London they began to loot. The citizens of London turned on the rebels and forced them out of the city in a bloody battle on London Bridge. To end the bloodshed the rebels were issued pardons by the king and told to return home. Cade fled but was later caught on 12 July 1450 by Alexander Iden, a future High Sheriff of Kent. As a result of the skirmish with Iden, the mortally wounded Cade died before reaching London for trial. The Jack Cade Rebellion has been perceived as a reflection of the social, political, and economic issues of the time period and as a precursor to the Wars of the Roses, which saw the decline of the Lancaster dynasty and the rise of the House of York.

== Identity ==
Jack Cade
- Born: c. 1420–1430; Probably Sussex
- Died: 12 July 1450; Cade Street, Sussex
- Other names: John Cade; John Mortimer
- Known for: Jack Cade's rebellion

Very little is known about the identity and origins of Jack Cade. Given that the rebel leader did not leave behind any personal documents, and the use of aliases was common among rebels, historians are forced to base their claims on rumour and speculation. According to Mark Antony Lower, Jack (or John) Cade was probably born in Sussex between 1420 and 1430 and historians agree for certain that he was a member of the lower ranks of society.

During the rebellion of 1450, Cade took on the title of "Captain of Kent" and adopted the alias "John Mortimer". The name "Mortimer" had negative connotations for King Henry VI and his associates because Henry's main rival for the throne of England was Richard, Duke of York, who had Mortimer ancestry on his mother's side and thus descent from Edward III. The possibility that Cade may have been working with York was enough to prompt the king into moving against the rebels without delay. At the time of the rebellion the Duke of York was out of the country serving as Lieutenant of Ireland. To date, no evidence has been found indicating that he was involved in funding or inciting the uprising. It is more likely that Cade used the name "Mortimer" as propaganda to give his cause more legitimacy. When the rebels were issued a pardon on 7 July 1450, Cade was issued a pardon under the name "Mortimer", but once it was discovered that he had lied about his identity, the pardon was rendered void.

Among his followers, Cade's dedication to having the people's complaints heard and restoring order within both local and central governments earned him the nickname "John Mend-all" or "John Amend-all". It is not known whether Cade himself chose the name or not.

One tale of the time claimed that Cade was the doctor John Alymere who was married to the daughter of a squire in Surrey. Another rumour suggested that he enjoyed dabbling in the dark arts and had once worked for Sir Tomas Dacres before fleeing the country after murdering a pregnant woman.

== Origins of the Jack Cade Rebellion ==
In the years preceding the Jack Cade Rebellion, England suffered from both internal and external difficulties and the animosity of the lower classes toward Henry VI was on the rise. Years of war against France had caused the country to go into debt and the recent loss of Normandy caused morale to decline and led to a widespread fear of invasion. Already the coastal regions of England such as Kent and Sussex were seeing attacks by Norman soldiers and French armies. Ill-equipped by the government, English soldiers took to raiding towns along the route to France with their victims receiving no compensation. Henry's call to set warning beacons along the coastline confirmed peoples' suspicions that an attack by the French was possible. These fears and continuous unrest in the coastal counties inspired many Englishmen to rally in an attempt to force the King to address their problems or abdicate his throne in favour of someone more competent. At court the different opinions on how England should proceed in the war with France led to party divisions. Henry favoured peace while his uncle the Duke of Gloucester and other nobles felt England should continue to fight for England's claim to the French throne. Internecine fighting in court eventually led to the banishment of the king's closest friend and advisor William de la Pole, 1st Duke of Suffolk.

To add to England's troubles many believed that the king had surrounded himself with advisors who were ineffective and corrupt. At the heart of the corruption scandal was the Duke of Suffolk. When the duke's body washed up on the shores of Dover the people of Kent feared retaliation. Rumours emerged claiming that the king intended to turn Kent into a Royal forest in retaliation for the duke's death. Tired of the exploitation that the Duke of Suffolk had come to represent, the commons of Kent led by Jack Cade marched on London. It is estimated that about 5,000 people took part in the uprising. In the spring of 1450, Cade organised the creation and distribution of a manifesto entitled The Complaint of the Poor Commons of Kent. The manifesto represented not only the grievances of the people but of several MPs, lords and magnates as well. The document included a list of fifteen complaints and five demands to be brought before the king for scrutiny and dictated the causes of the revolt. The first issue to be addressed was that Cade's followers from Kent were being unjustly blamed for the death of the Duke of Suffolk. Despite the well-known anger of the peasants towards the Duke, the Bill of Complaints dismissed the idea that the rebels were responsible. In addition the rebels called for inquiries into cases of corruption within local and national governments and for the removal of corrupt high officials. Cade's list of complaints goes on to charge King Henry with injustice for not choosing to impeach his underlings and lords even though they were guilty of treasonous and unlawful acts. The king's counsellors and officials were accused of rigging elections, extortion, manipulating the king for their own gains and using their close position to the king to oppress those below them. Besides the Duke of Suffolk, the rebels explicitly called out James Fiennes, 1st Baron Saye and Sele and officials Crowmer, Isley, St Leger and Est for extortion. Affiliates of Suffolk, Lord Saye and his son-in-law Crowmer held prominent positions within the king's household and in the local administration of Kent. Both had served several terms as High Sheriffs of Kent and as members of the king's council. Furthermore, in 1449, Saye was appointed to the prestigious office of Lord High Treasurer. Isley and St Leger also served as Sheriffs and MPs in the county of Kent.

When the king failed to remedy their grievances the rebels marched on London.

== Rebellion ==
In May 1450, the rebels began to join together in an organised fashion and began to move towards London. Cade sent out delegates to the surrounding counties to elicit aid and additional men. By early June more than 5,000 men had assembled at Blackheath, 6 miles (9.7 km) south-east of the City of London. They were mostly peasants but their numbers were swelled by shopkeepers, craftsmen, and some landowners (the list of pardoned shows the presence of one knight, two MPs, and eighteen squires). Several soldiers and sailors returning via Kent from the French wars also joined in the fray.

Hoping to disperse the rebellion before any real damage could be done, the king sent a small host of his royal contingents to quell the rebellion. The royal forces were led by Sir Humphrey Stafford (d. 1450), of Grafton in the parish of Bromsgrove, Worcestershire, and his second cousin William Stafford (d. 1450), of Southwick, Wiltshire (father of Humphrey Stafford, 1st Earl of Devon).

The royal forces underestimated the rebels' strength and were led into an ambush at Sevenoaks. In the skirmish on 18 June 1450, the two Stafford cousins were killed. Cade took the expensive clothing and armour of Sir Humphrey as his own.

On 28 June, William Ayscough, the unpopular Bishop of Salisbury, was murdered by a mob in Wiltshire. William Ayscough had been the king's personal confessor and his position next to the king had allowed him to become one of the most powerful men in the country. Afraid that he might meet the same fate and shocked by the rebels' military ability, the king sought refuge in Warwickshire.

Gaining confidence through their victory the rebels advanced to Southwark, at the southern end of London Bridge. Cade set up headquarters in The White Hart inn before crossing the bridge and entering the city with his followers on 3 July 1450. To prevent any infringement on his comings and goings within the city Cade cut the ropes on the bridge so that they could not be raised against him.

Upon entering London, Cade stopped at the London Stone. He struck the stone with his sword and declared himself Lord Mayor in the traditional manner. By striking the stone, Cade had symbolically reclaimed the country for the Mortimers to whom he claimed to be related.

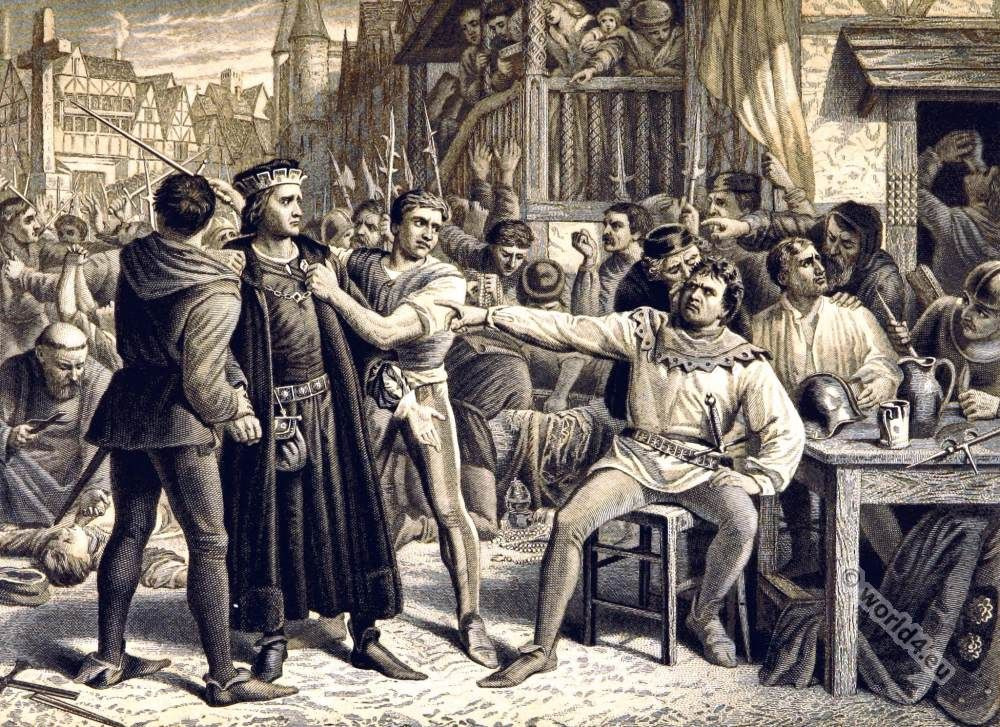
Lord Saye and Sele brought before Cade on 4 July

Once inside the city's gates, Cade and his men initiated a series of tribunals dedicated to seeking out and convicting those accused of corruption. At Guildhall on 4 July, Lord Saye and Sele, the Lord High Treasurer, was brought in for a sham trial. Upon being found guilty of treason he was taken to Cheapside and beheaded.

Fiennes' son-in-law William Crowmer (son of William Cromer (died 1434), a former Sheriff of London, MP and twice Lord Mayor of London) was also executed by the rebels. The heads of the two men were put on pikes and unceremoniously paraded through the streets of London while their bearers pushed them together so that they appeared to kiss. Their heads were then affixed to London Bridge.

Despite Cade's frequent assurances that his followers would maintain a proper and orderly demeanour, as the rebel host made its way through the city many of the rebels, including Cade himself, began to engage in looting and drunken behaviour.

Gradually Cade's inability to control his followers alienated the initially sympathetic citizens of London, who eventually turned against the rebels. When, on 7 July, Cade's army returned over the bridge to Southwark for the night, the London officials closed the bridge to prevent Cade from re-entering the city.

The next day, on 8 July, at about ten in the evening, a battle erupted on London Bridge between Cade's army and various citizens and officials of London. The battle lasted until eight the next morning, when the rebels retreated with heavy casualties. One writer estimated that at least 40 Londoners and 200 rebels were killed at the battle.

== Cade's fall ==
After the battle on London Bridge, Archbishop John Kemp (Lord Chancellor) persuaded Cade to call off his followers by issuing official pardons, and promising to fulfil the rebels' demands. Although King Henry VI had issued pardons to Cade and his followers, a proclamation written by the King shortly after the rebellion voided all previously issued pardons. The document was entitled "Writ and Proclamation by the King for the Taking of Cade". In the document the King claimed that he revoked the previous pardons because they had not been created or approved by the Parliament. In the proclamation Cade was charged with deceiving the people of England to assemble with him in his rebellion and stated that none of the King's subjects should join Cade or help him in any way. A reward of 1,000 marks was promised to whoever could capture and deliver Jack Cade to the king, dead or alive.

Cade fled towards Lewes but on 12 July, in a garden in which he had taken shelter, was overtaken by Alexander Iden (eventual second husband of the murdered William Cromer's widow Elizabeth Fiennes, and a future High Sheriff of Kent). In the skirmish, Cade was fatally wounded and died before reaching London for trial. As a warning to others, Cade's body underwent a mock trial and was beheaded at Newgate. Cade's body was dragged through the streets of London before being quartered. His limbs were sent throughout Kent to various cities and locations that were believed to have been strong supporters of the rebel uprising.

== Aftermath ==
To prevent further uprisings, Humphrey Stafford, 1st Duke of Buckingham was given permission from the king to seek out the remainder of Cade's followers and bring them to trial. The search took place in and around areas where support for the uprising was felt to be the strongest—Blackheath, Canterbury and the coastal areas of Faversham and the Isle of Sheppey. The inquiries by bishops and justices were so thorough that in Canterbury (the first area searched by the royal commission) eight followers were quickly found and hanged.

Although the Jack Cade Rebellion was quickly dispersed after Cade's death, the royal commission failed to rid England of the feeling of rebellion. Inspired by Cade and his rebellion many other counties in England revolted. In Sussex the yeomen brothers John and William Merfold organised their own rebellion against King Henry VI. Unlike Cade's revolt the men of Sussex were more radical and aggressive in their demands for reform. It is possible the animosity felt by the men of Sussex had arisen in part because the king had revoked the pardons issued to Cade and his followers. An indictment following the Sussex rebellion accused the rebels of wanting to kill the king and all his Lords, replacing them with twelve of the rioters' own men. The rebellions in Sussex did not achieve the same following as that of Cade's.

While the minor rebellions inspired by Cade's rebellion did not produce a large number of deaths or immediate changes they can be seen as important precursors to the Wars of the Roses. These large battles over the crown of England would result in the end of the Lancaster dynasty and the creation of the Yorks. The weakness of the Lancaster dynasty and the English government had been exposed.

In addition, the request made by the rebels in Cade's manifesto that the king welcome the Duke of York as his advisor outright informed the king that the masses wished to see the duke return from exile. When Richard the Duke of York finally did return to England in September 1450 several of his demands and reform policies were based on those made in the manifesto issued by Cade.

== Monument ==
There is long-standing tradition that this clash between Iden and Cade took place at a small hamlet near (old) Heathfield in East Sussex. This place had since become known as Cade Street. A monument dedicated to Cade has been placed along the roadside. The monument states that on this location the rebel leader Jack Cade was captured and killed by Alexander Iden. Given that the exact location of Cade's capture is under dispute it is possible that Cade Street was named in error. The monument was erected by Francis Newbury between 1791 and 1819.

== Literature ==
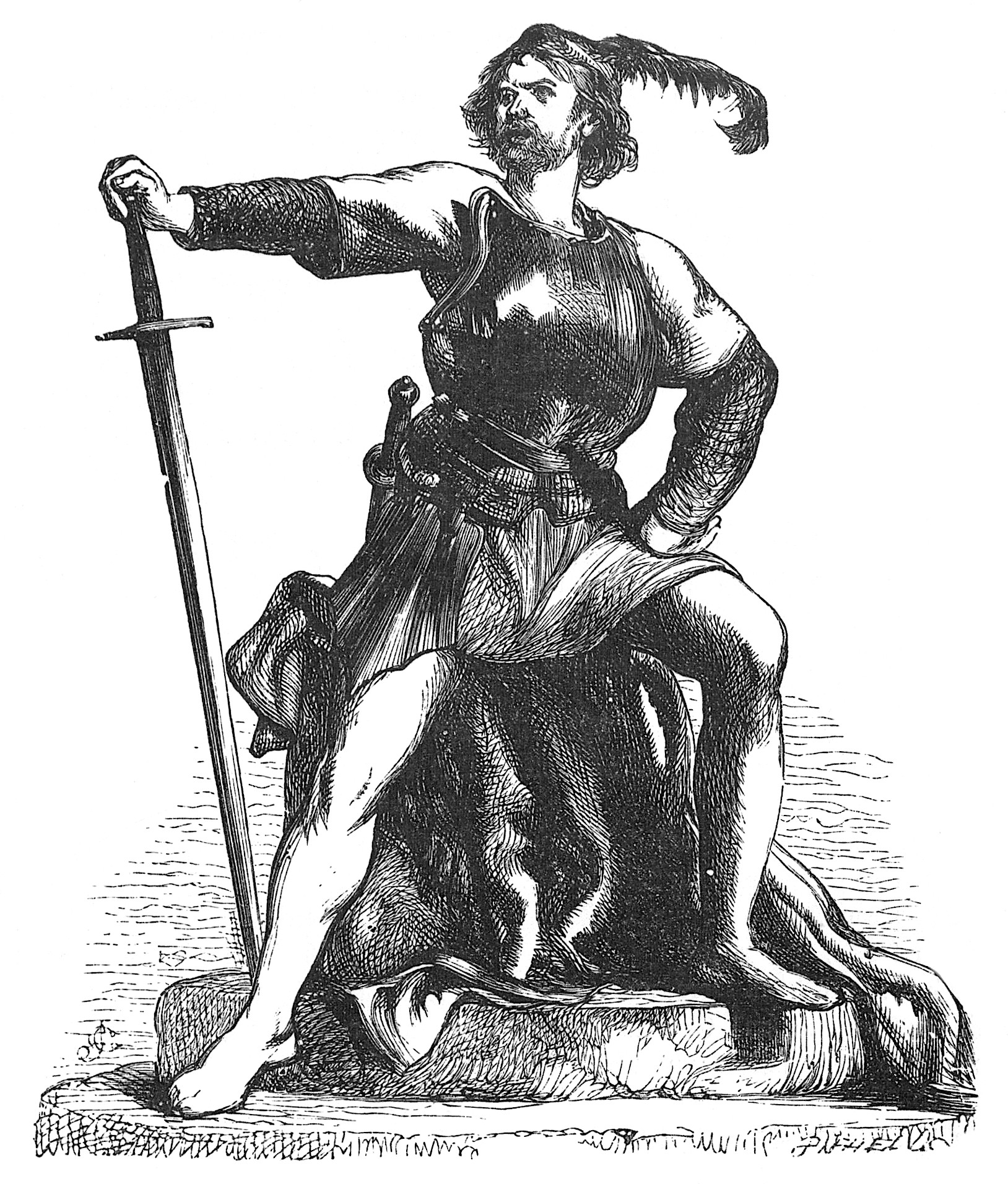
1881 drawing by John Gilbert of Cade sitting on London Stone in a performance of Henry VI

- The story of Jack Cade's Rebellion was later dramatised by William Shakespeare in his play, Henry VI, Part 2.
- It was also dramatised in the 1835 play Aylmere (also billed as Jack Cade) by the Philadelphia politician and writer Robert T. Conrad. Though originally written for another actor, the play was for many years a principal part of the repertory of the American tragedian Edwin Forrest.
- In 1852 Conrad published a volume of poetry entitled Aylmere, or the Bondman of Kent, and other Poems.
- The novel London Bridge Is Falling (1934) by Philip Lindsay focuses on Jack Cade's revolt.
- Jack Cade is a prominent character in the historical novel series Wars of the Roses, by Conn Iggulden.
- Jack Cade, as well as Wat Tyler, is mentioned as a failed rebel whose example the protagonist seeks to learn from in A Connecticut Yankee in King Arthur's Court by Mark Twain.
- Jack Cade appears as a resident of Heaven in Charles Erskine Scott Wood's Heavenly Discourse.

== See also ==
- Bay Fleet
- Great Slump (15th century)
- Hundred Years' War
- Jack Cade's Cavern
- John and William Merfold
- Wars of the Roses

== Bibliography ==
- Bohna, M. (2003). "Armed Force and Civic Legitimacy in Jack Cade's Revolt, 1450". English Historical Review. 118 (477): 563–582. doi:10.1093/ehr/118.477.563. JSTOR 3489286.
- Griffiths, R.A. (1981). The Reign of King Henry VI. London: Ernest Benn. ISBN 978-0-510-26261-7.
- Harvey, I.M.W. (1991). Jack Cade's Rebellion of 1450. Oxford: Clarendon Press (published 3 October 1991). ISBN 978-0-19-820160-1.
- Harvey, I.M.W. (1995). "Was There Popular Politics in Fifteenth Century England?". In R.H. Britnell & A.J. Pollard (eds.). The McFarlane Legacy: Studies in Late Medieval Politics and Society. Stroud: Sutton Publishing. pp. 155–174. ISBN 978-0-7509-0626-5.
- Harvey, I.M.W. (2004). "Cade, John [Jack] (d. 1450), rebel leader". Oxford Dictionary of National Biography (online) (online ed.). Oxford University Press. doi:10.1093/ref:odnb/4292. (Subscription, Wikipedia Library access or UK public library membership required.)
- Kaufman, Alexander L. (2009). The Historical Literature of the Jack Cade Rebellion. Farnham: Ashgate (published 28 September 2009). ISBN 978-0-7546-6703-2.
- Lower, M.A. (1865). The Worthies of Sussex. Lewes: Sussex Archaeological Society. OCLC 156054788.
- Mate, Mavis (1992). "The economic and social roots of medieval popular rebellion: Sussex in 1450–1451". Economic History Review. 45 (4): 661–676. doi:10.1111/j.1468-0289.1992.tb01311.x. JSTOR 2597413.
- Rosenthal, Joel T. (1994). "Reviews: I. M. W. Harvey, Jack Cade's Rebellion of 1450 ". Speculum. 69 (1): 161–163. doi:10.2307/2864822. JSTOR 2864822.
- Edward Vallance, A Radical History of Britain Abacus books, 2009; 2010 ISBN 978-0-349-12026-3
- Alison Weir, "The Wars of the Roses", Ballantine Books, Trade Paper back edition July 1996, p. 147 ISBN 0-345-40433-5
- Jack Cade's Rebellion on britainexpress.com
- "The second Part of Henry the Sixth", Project Gutenberg
