= The Complaint of the Poor Commons of Kent =

1450 manifesto

The Complaint of the Poor Commons of Kent was a manifesto issued by Jack Cade, a Kentish rebel in 1450, before his march on London. The 'popular grievances' from this manifesto were frequently quoted by the Yorkists during The Wars of the Roses, for propaganda purposes.

== Text ==
A proclamation made by Jacke Cade, Capytayn of yͤ Rebelles in Kent. Anno m.iiijc.l.

Thes be the poyntys, causes, and myscheves of gaderynge and assemblinge of us the Kynges lege men of Kent, the iiij day of June, the yere of owr Lorde m.iiijc.l., the regne of our sovereyn Lorde the Kynge xxixti, the whiche we trust to All myghte God to remedy, withe the helpe and the grace of God and of owr soverayn lorde the kynge, and the pore commyns of Ingelond, and elles we shall dye there fore:

We, consyderyng that the kynge owre sovereyn lorde, by the insaciable covetows malicious pompes, and fals and of nowght browght up certeyn persones, and dayly and nyghtly is abowt his hynesse, and dayly enforme hym that good is evyll and evyll is good, as Scripture witnesseth, Ve vobis qui dicitis bonum malum et malum bonum.

Item, they sey that owre sovereyn lorde is a bove his lawys to his pleysewr, and he may make it and breke it as hym lyst, withe owt eny distinction. The contrary is trew, and elles he shuld not have sworn to kepe it, the whyche we conceyvyd for the hyghest poynt of treson that eny soget may do to make his prynce renn in perjury.

Item, they sey that the commons of Inglond wolde fyrst dystroye the kynges fryndes and afftarwarde hym selff, and then brynge the Duke of Yorke to be kyng, so that by ther fals menys and lyes they make hym to hate and to distroy his frendys, and cherysythe his fals traytors. They calle themselves his frendys, and yf ther were no more reson in yͤ worlde to knowe, he may knowe they be not his fryndes by theyr covytysnes.

Item, they sey that the kyng shuld lyve upon his commons, and that ther bodyes and goods ben the kynges; the contrary is trew, for then nedyd hym nevar perlement to syt to aske good of his comonys.

Item, they sey that it were gret reproffe to the kynge to take ageyne that he hath gevyn, so that they woll not sufere hym to have his owne good, ne londe, ne forfeture, ne eny othar good but they aske it from hym, or ells they take bribes of othar to gett it for them.

Item, it ys to be remedied that the fals traytours wyll sofre no man to come to the kynges presens for no cawse with out bribes where none owght to be had, ne no bribery about the kynges persone, but that eny man myght have his comynge to hym to aske hym grace or jugement in such cas as the kynge may gyve.

Item, it is a hevy thynge that yͤ good Duke of Gloucestar was apechid of treson by o fals traytour alone and so sone was morderyd and myght nevar come to his answer; but the fals traytur Pole was apechyd by all the holl comyns of Ingelond, the whiche nombre passyd a quest of xxiiijm., and myght not be suffryd to dye as yͤ law wolde, but rather the sayd trayturs of the affinite of Pole that was as fals as Fortager wolde that the kynge owre soverein lord shuld hold a batayll with in his owne realme to dystroy his pepyll and aftarward hym selffe.

Item, they say that whom yͤ kyng woll shall be traytur and whom he woll shall be non, and that apperyth hederto, for yf eny of the traytours about hym wolde malygne ageynst eny person, hyghe or low, they wolde fynd fals menys that he shuld dy a traytor for to have his londes and his goods, but they wyll sufer the kynge nethar to pay his dettes with all, ner pay for his vytaylls ner be the rychar of one peny.

Item, the law servyth of nowght ellys in thes days but for to do wrong, for nothyng is sped almost but false maters by coulour of the law for mede, drede, and favor, and so no remedy is had in yͤ cowrt of conscience in eny wyse.

Item, we sey owr sovereyn lord may understond that his fals cowncell hath lost his law, his marchandyse is lost, his comon people is dystroyed, the see is lost, Fraunce is lost, the kynge hym selffe is so set that he may not pay for his mete nor drynke, and he owythe more then evar eny Kynge of Yngland owght, for dayly his traytours abowt hym wher eny thyng shuld come to hym by his lawes, anon they aske it from hym.

Item, they aske jentylmens goodys and londes in Kent and call them rysers and traytors and the kynges enimys, but they shall be fond the kynges trew legemen and best frendys with the helpe of Jesu, to whom we cry day and nyght with many m. mo that God of his grace and rytwysnese shall take vengawnce and dystroy the fals govournors of his realme that hath brought us to nowght and in to myche sorowe and mysery.

Item, we wyll that all men knowe we blame not all the lordys, ne all tho that is about yͤ kyngs person, ne all jentyllmen ne yowmen, ne all men of lawe, ne all bysshopes, ne all prestys, but all suche as may be fownde gylty by just and trew enquery and by the law.

Item, we wyll that it be knone we wyll not robbe, ne reve, ne stelle, but that thes defautes be amendyd, and then we wyll go home; where fore we exort all the kyngys trew legemen to helpe us, to support us, for what so evar he be that wyll not that thes defawtes be amendyd, he is falser than a Jewe or Sarasyn, and we shall with as good wyll lyve and dye upon hym as apon a Jewe or a Sarasyn, for who is a genst us in this casse hym wyll we marke, for he is not the trewe kyngys legeman.

Item, his trewe comyns desyre that he wyll avoyd from hym all the fals progeny and affynyte of the Dewke of Suffolke, the which ben openly knowne, and that they be p[u]nyshyd afftar law of lond, and to take about his noble person his trew blode of his ryall realme, that is to say, the hyghe and myghty prynce the Duke of Yorke, exilyd from owre sovereyne lords person by the noysyng of the fals traytore the Duke of Suffolke and his affinite. Also to take about his person the myghte prynce, the Duke of Exceter, the Duke of Bokyngham, the Duke of Norffolke, and his trewe erlys and barons of his lond, and he shall be the rychest kynge crystyn.

Item, the trewe comyns desyryth the punyshement upon the fals traytours, the which conterfetyd and imagenyd the dethe of the hyghe and myghtfull and excellent prynce the Duke of Glowcester, the which is to mych to reherse, the which duke was proclaymyd at Bery openly in the parlement a traytur, upon the whiche qwaryll we purposse us to lyve and dye that it is fals; allso owre fadyr the cardenall, the good Duke of Exeter, the nobyll prynce the Duke of Warwyke, the wiche ware delyveryd by the same menys untrew; allso the realme of Fraunce lost, the Duchy of Normandy, Gascon, and Gyan, and Anjoy demayn lost by the same traytours, and owr trew lordys, knyghtes, and squyres, and many good yemen lost and wer sold or they went, the whiche is gret pyte and gret losse to our sovereyn Lord and to all the realme.

Item, they desyre that all the extorsiners myght be leyd downe, that is to say, yͤ grene wexe, the which is falsly used to the perpetwall hurt and distructyon of the trew comyns of Kent; also the extorsiners of the Kynges Benche, the which is ryght chargeable to all the comyns with owten provysyon of owr sovereyn lord and his trew cowncell.

Item, takynge of whet and othar greyns, beffe, motton and other vytayll, the which is inportable hurt to the comyns, with out provysyon of owr sovereyn lord and his trew councell, for his comyns may no lengar bere it.

Item, the statute upon the laborers and the gret extorsiners of Kent, that is to sey, Slegge, Crowmer, Isle, and Robert Est.

Item, where we meve and desyre that same trew justyce wyth certeyn trew lords and knyghts may be sent in to Kent for to enqwere of all fuch traytors and brybors, and that the justice may do upon them trew jugement, what some evar they be; and that owr soverayn lorde dyrecte his lettars patentes to all the pepull ther universall opynly to be rede and cryed, that it is owre sovereyn lordys wyll and preyar of all his peple trewly to enquere of every mans govarnawnce and of defawtes that reygneth, nother for love, favor, dred ne hate, and that dewe jugement shalbe forthe with and ther upon. The kynge to kepe in his owne handes theyr londes and goodys, and not gyve them aweye to no man but kepe them for his rychesse, or ells owre soverayn lorde to make his emarme in to Fraunce, or ells to pay his dettes; by this owr wrytynge ye may conceyve and se whethar we be the fryndes ethar enimys.

Item, to syt upon this enqwerye we refuse no juge except iij chefe juges, the which ben fals to beleve.

Item, they that be gylte wyll wrye ageynst this, but God wyll brynge them downe, and that they shall be ashamyd to speke ageynst reson, but they wyll go to the kynge and say that yf they be taken fro hym that we wyll put hym downe, for the traytours wyll lyve lenger, and yf we were disposed ageynst owr sovereyn lorde, as God it forbyd, what myght then the traytowrs helpe hym?

Item, thes defawtes thus dewly remedyd, and from hens forthe no man upon peyne of deth beyng abowt the kyngs person shall take no maner of brybe for eny byll of petysyons or caws spedynge or lettynge, owr sovereyn lord shall regne and rewle with gret worshipe, and have love of God and of his people, for he shall have so gret love of his people that he shall with Gods helpe conqwere where he wyll; and as lor us, we shall be all weye redy to defend owr cuntre from all nacions with our owne goods, and to go withe owr sovereyne lorde where he wyll commaunde us, as his trew legemen.

Finis.
