= Jack Cade's Cavern =

Cavern southeast of London

Coordinates: 51.4733°N 0.0112°W

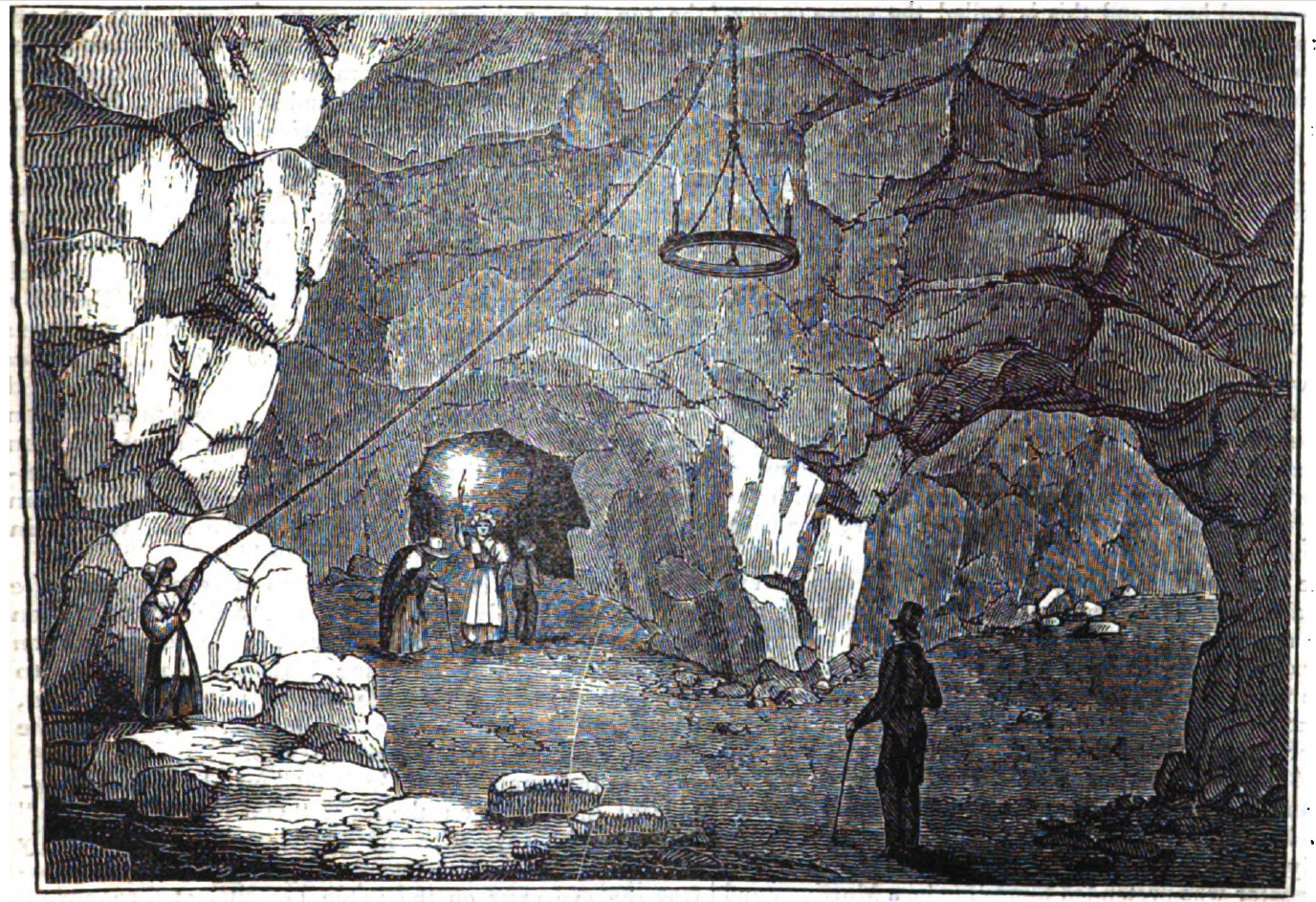
Artistic Works depicting Blackheath Caverns, circa 1833.

Jack Cade's Cavern is a cavern, extending several hundred feet underground, in Blackheath, south-east London, England. It is located northwest of the Heath and southwest of Greenwich Park, mostly beneath the lawn of Hollymount Close. It was re-discovered in about the year 1780. They are also referred to as the Blackheath Caverns. The entrance was at the end of a row of small cottages called "Cavern Cottages" at the rear of Trinity Church on Blackheath Hill, (destroyed in WWII).

== Dimensions ==
Entered by a flight of forty steps, it consisted of three or more separate caverns joined to one another by tunnels. The first or main cavern is roughly circular and about 35 ft (11 m) in diameter. Leading from this is another about 60 by 30 ft (18.3 by 9.1 m). There is a long, winding passage leading to a chamber which is about 24 by 31 ft (7.3 by 9.4 m), varying in height from 6 ft (1.8 m) to 11 ft 6 in (3.51 m), with a well of pure water, 27 ft (8.2 m) in depth, although in 1939 this was found to be 21 ft (6.4 m), partly brick lined and quite dry. At its lowest it is 170 ft (52 m) from the surface.
