= Westwell, Kent =

Village in Kent, England

Coordinates: 51.191°N 0.845°E

Westwell
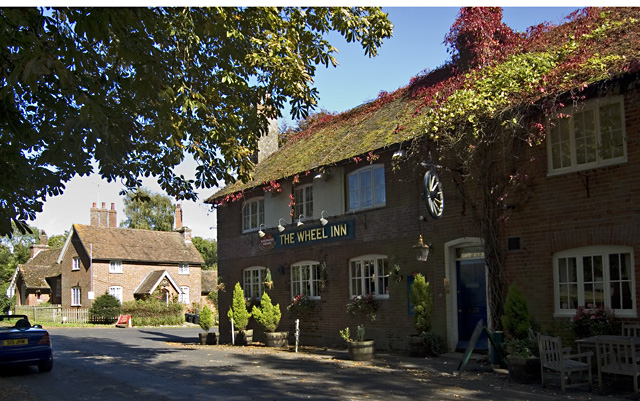
- The Wheel Inn

- Location within Kent
- Area: 12.57 km^{2} (4.85 sq mi)
- Population: 1,080 (civil parish, 2021)
  - Density: 86/km^{2} (220/sq mi)
- OS grid reference: TQ989474
- Civil parish: Westwell
- District: Ashford
- Shire county: Kent
- Region: South East
- Country: England
- Sovereign state: United Kingdom
- Post town: ASHFORD
- Postcode district: TN25
- Dialling code: 01233
- Police: Kent
- Fire: Kent
- Ambulance: South East Coast
- UK Parliament: Weald of Kent
- Website: Westwell Parish Council

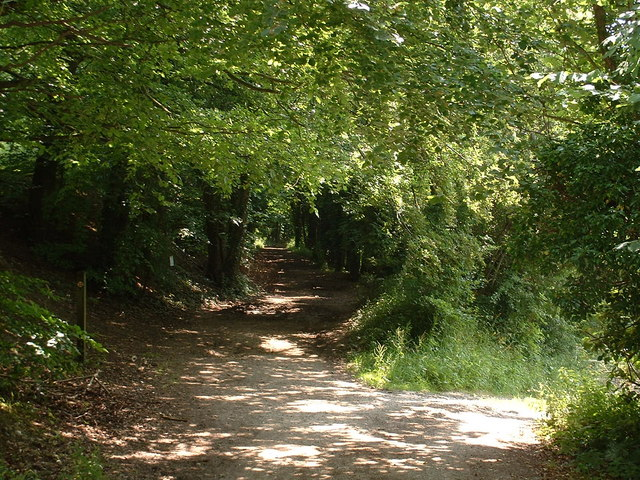
The Pilgrims' Way runs near Westwell

Westwell is a village and relatively elevated civil parish centred 4 miles (6 km) north of Ashford in Kent, England, in the Borough of Ashford.

The parish had a population of 1,080 at the 2021 census, little changed since 2001 and 2011. Besides Westwell village, the parish includes the hamlets of Dunn Street, Potters Corner, and Tutt Hill.

The Pilgrims' Way runs above the village on the Downs, and was travelled by pilgrims on their way to Canterbury. The south-western boundary of the parish follows the A20 Ashford–Maidstone road, and the M20 motorway and two railways – the Maidstone line and High Speed 1 – pass through the south-west of the parish.

== History ==
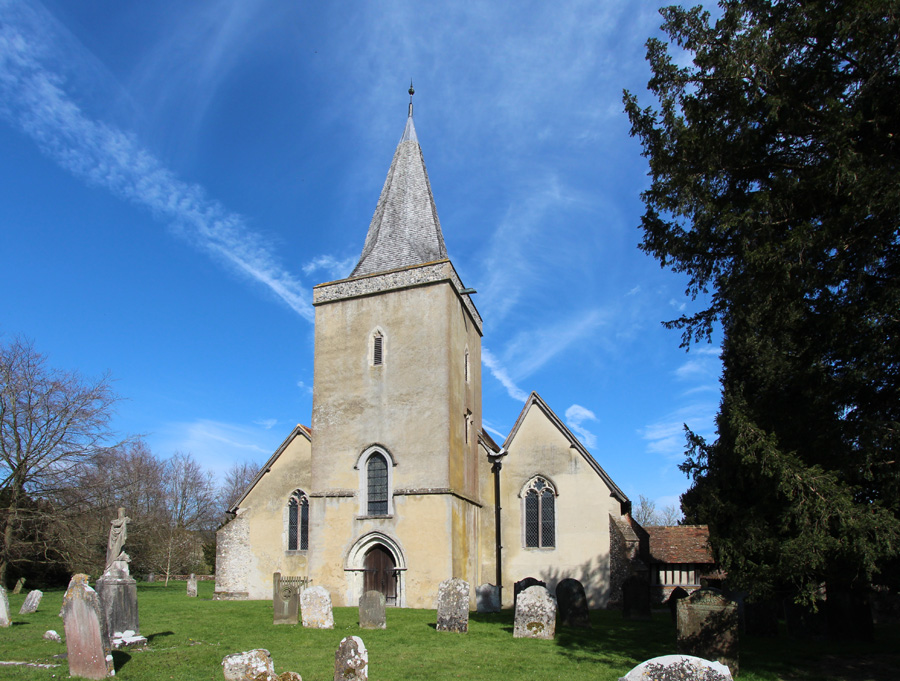
St Mary’s Church

Westwell is a rural village in the North Downs Area of Outstanding Natural Beauty at the foot of the Westwell Downs, the highest part of which is called the Beacon after the chain of beacons erected to signal the approach of the Spanish Armada. The village was first mentioned in 858 in a Saxon document and was included in the Domesday Book. A weekly market was held here under a licence granted by Edward I, there was a park during Edward II's time and later a vineyard tended by monks (recalled by one of the cottages in the village named Vineyards).

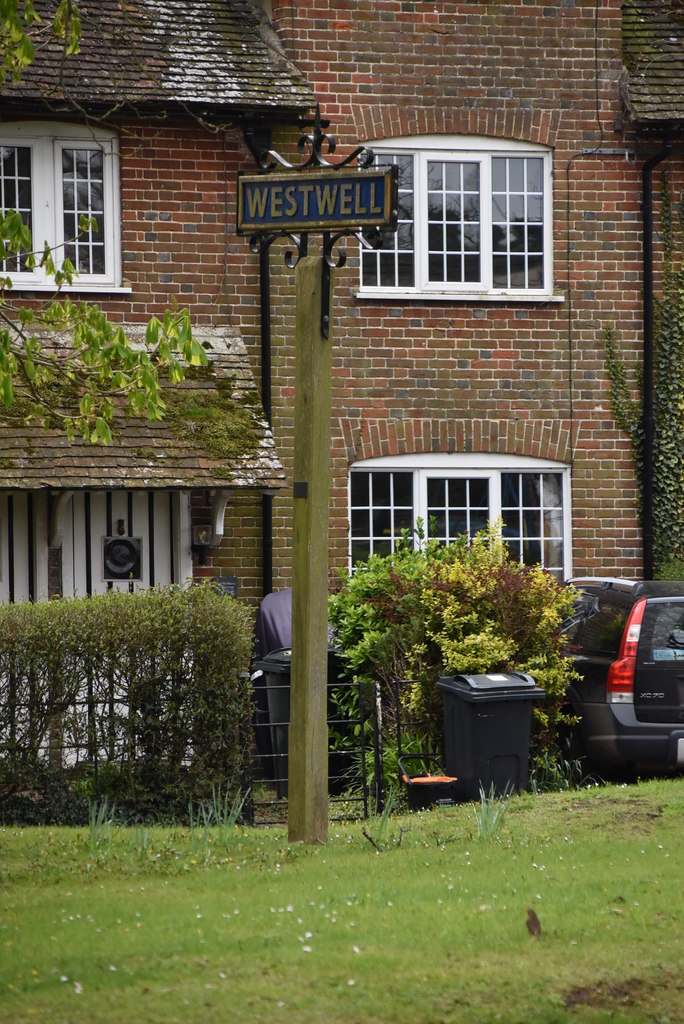
Village sign

The centre of the village is a conservation area with many mature trees and listed buildings, including Court Lodge, Swinford Cottage, Periton Court and The Mill House. The notable parish church is St. Mary the Virgin which dates from the 13th century or earlier. Among many other buildings of interest in the parish are Ripple Court (which used to house the local dungeons—and where it is alleged that Jack Cade was captured) and The Haven (pronounced 'harven') a Tudor residence where Elizabeth I is believed to have spent one night. The village was formerly served by Hothfield for Westwell railway station on the Maidstone Line. Kent Gliding Club is nearby.

== See also ==
- Listed buildings in Westwell, Kent
