= Charles Erskine Scott Wood =

American author (1852–1944)

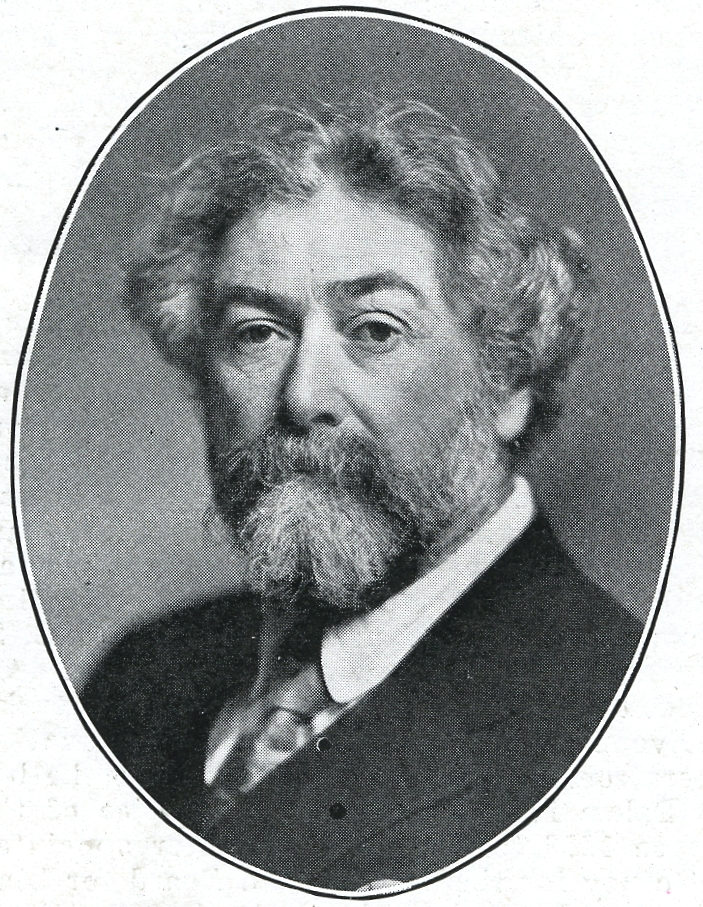
- Wood c. 1910
- Born: February 20, 1852; Erie, Pennsylvania, US
- Died: January 22, 1944 (aged 91); Los Gatos, California, US
- Other name: C.E.S. Wood
- Education: United States Military Academy
- Occupations: Author, attorney, soldier, lawyer, satirist
- Known for: Heavenly Discourse
- Political party: Democratic
- Spouse(s): Nanny Moale Smith, Sara Bard Field
- Children: Nan Wood Honeyman, Erskine Wood I

Charles Erskine Scott Wood (February 20, 1852 – January 22, 1944), also known as C. E. S. Wood, was an American author, civil liberties advocate, artist, soldier, and attorney. He is best known as the author of the 1927 satirical bestseller, Heavenly Discourse.

== Early life ==
Born in Erie, Pennsylvania, Wood graduated from West Point in 1874. He served as a lieutenant with the 21st Infantry Regiment and fought in the Nez Perce War in 1877. He was present at the surrender of Chief Joseph of the Nez Perce. It was Wood who transcribed, and perhaps embellished, Chief Joseph's famous speech, which ended with: "My heart is sick and sad. From where the sun now stands, I will fight no more forever." The two men became close friends.

He raised his family in Portland at a house on King's Hill near the northeast corner of today's Vista Bridge. The site is now occupied by the Portland Garden Club in the Goose Hollow neighborhood. John Reed grew up a few blocks away and was greatly influenced by Wood.

== Oregon politics ==
Following his service he became a prominent attorney in Portland, Oregon, where he often defended labor unions and "radicals" including birth control activist Margaret Sanger. He began to write, became a frequent contributor to The Pacific Monthly magazine, and was a leader of Portland's literary community.

In 1896, Wood was Oregon's sole representative on the national committee of the National Democratic Party, known as the Gold Democrats. The party, which had the blessing of Grover Cleveland, championed defense of the gold standard and free trade.

Like many Cleveland Democrats, including his long-time friend Mark Twain, Wood joined the American Anti-Imperialist League. The League called for the United States to grant immediate independence to the Philippines and other territories conquered in the Spanish–American War.

== Politics ==
As a lawyer during the early twentieth century, Wood represented dissidents such as Emma Goldman. He wrote articles for radical journals such as Liberty, The Masses, and Mother Earth. He was a philosophical anarchist and declared himself as such before an Industrial Workers of the World audience.

Wood was unflagging in his opposition to state power. He advocated such causes as civil liberties for anti-war protesters, birth control, and anti-imperialism. In 1927, he wrote in Heavenly Discourse that the "city of George Washington is blossoming into quite a nice little seat of empire and centralized bureaucracy. The people have a passion to 'let Uncle Sam do it.' The federal courts are police courts. An entire system with an army of officials has risen on the income tax; another on prohibition. The freedom of the common man, more vital to progress than income or alcohol, has vanished." He was described by historian Kevin Starr as being "a Populist-Progressive with strong leanings toward the single tax theory of Henry George and a foe of organized religion."

== Artist and painter ==
Wood advocated for the native peoples, but he also painted them. His love of painting generated numerous studies of landscapes and points of interest along the Oregon and California coastline. He also memorialized some of his favorite places in watercolor including Keats' grave and vistas from his home in Los Gatos, California.

His primary medium was watercolor and graphite. The Huntington Library has a good sampling of his artwork online.

== Time in Los Gatos ==
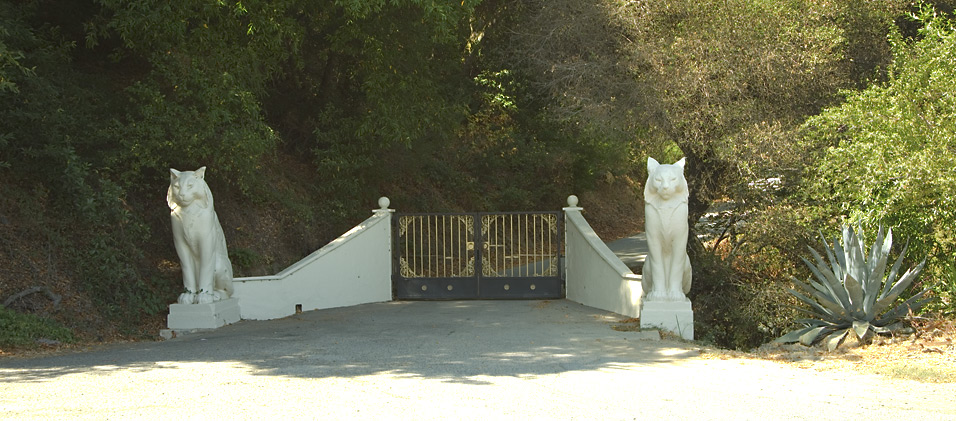
Entry to "The Cats" estate in Los Gatos, California.

From 1925 until his death in 1944, Wood lived with his second wife, Sara Bard Field, in Los Gatos in a house named "The Cats" or the "Cats Estate" located on the hill on southbound Highway 17. The house was built in 1925 on a 34-acre property, with an entry way featuring a wrought iron gate flanked by two large white cat sculptures, named Leo and Leona. The sculptures were made by sculptor Robert Paine, and an image of them is featured on the seal of the town of Los Gatos. Many famous people visited this home, including Charlie Chaplin, Eleanor Roosevelt, and John Steinbeck.

== Friends ==
His friends included Ansel Adams, Albert M. Bender, Clarence Darrow, Eugene Debs, Emma Goldman, Chief Joseph, Childe Hassam, Robinson Jeffers, Margaret Sanger, and John Steinbeck.

== Death and legacy ==
At the time of his death, Wood was West Point's oldest living graduate. He was the father of Nan Wood Honeyman, Oregon's first U. S. congresswoman.

== Portrayal in film ==
Wood was portrayed by Sam Elliott in the TV movie I Will Fight No More Forever. In the film, he is a United States captain who fights in the Nez Perce War.

== Bibliography ==
=== Books by C.E.S. Wood ===
- Heavenly Discourse (Reprint: Kessinger Publishing, 2005) ISBN 1-4179-1765-2
- A Masque of Love (W.M. Hill, 1904) ASIN B00086BIH0
- Too Much Government (Vanguard Press, 1931) ASIN B00085T49U
- Heavenly Discourse (Vanguard Press, 1927) ASIN B00085SZEK
- The Poet in the Desert ASIN B00085YKLW
- A Book of Indian Tales (Vanguard Press, 1929)
- Earthly Discourse (Vanguard Press, 1937) ASIN B00085SZEK

=== Articles by C.E.S. Wood ===
- The Pursuit and Capture of Chief Joseph. Appendix in Chester Anders Fee, Chief Joseph: The Biography of a Great Indian, Wilson-Erickson, 1936. Retrieved from pbs.org 2008-04-08.
- Among the Thlinkits in Alaska, The Century Magazine , vol. 24, issue 3 (July 1882)
- Chief Joseph, the Nez Perce,The Century Magazine vol. 28, issue 1 (May 1884).
- Famous Indians, The Century Magazine, vol. 46, issue 3 (July 1893).
- An Indian Horse Race, The Century Magazine, vol. 33, issue 3 (Jan 1887)
