= Heavenly Discourse =

Essay collection by C.E.S Wood

Heavenly Discourse is a collection of satirical essays by Charles Erskine Scott Wood, published in 1927.

== Publication ==
Wood primarily wrote poetry and serious prose. However, Max Eastman and John Reed, co-editors of the radical magazine The Masses, (Note: Sources disagree on who the editor(s) of The Masses was or were, and it may have changed in time. Bingham & Barnes (1997, p. 265-267) and Robbins, Frank & Ross (1983, p. 162) both list Eastman and John Reed. Starr (2002, p. 63) lists Eastman and Floyd Dell. The Wikipedia article for The Masses seems to indicate that it was just Eastman.) asked him to write something humorous for their periodical. The result was a short satirical attack on World War I named The Heavenly Dialogue, published in 1914. This became the first of a series of similar dialogues. Ten of these were published in The Masses. Following passage of the Espionage Act of 1917, The Masses was suppressed by the U. S. government on the grounds that it was detrimental to the war effort. Wood continued to write more discourses. After World War I, Max Eastman and others urged publication of the discourses in book form. In 1927, the Vanguard Press published a collection of forty-one of them under the title Heavenly Discourse.

== Content ==
The work is primarily a dialogue between Satan and God about contemporary issues. They are presented as friendly adversaries who are often in general agreement. God represents Wood's own perspective. A variety of other characters also join the conversation, including angels, Jesus, Buddha, the Czar of Russia, Billy Sunday, Socrates, John Pierpont Morgan, Teddy Roosevelt, Carrie Nation, Sappho, François Rabelais, Margaret Sanger, and Mark Twain.

Politically radical, the essays ridicule war, prudishness, patriotism, bigotry and Christian theology. Instead, they promoted bohemianism, free love, pacifism, socialism, birth control, and women's rights. The satire of these essays mocks mainstream society and views it with skepticism. Titles of some of the discourses include Is God a Jew?, The United States Must Be Pure, and The Stupid Cannot Enter Heaven. Wood wrote Heavenly Discourse from the bourgeois radicalism of Greenwich Village of which he was a part.

In one of the essays, Billy Sunday meets God, Wood pokes at bourgeois morality by imagining Billy Sunday in Heaven, surprised and disappointed to find people he condemned there. Jesus responds to his complaints, and points out that he associated with drinkers and prostitutes.

Heavenly discourse is one of very few Western texts from this era to mention the angel Israfil of Arab folklore.

== Reception ==
Although Wood wrote extensively, this was his only work to reach a wide audience. The book had a substantial impact on Robert Paul Wolff and Todd Gitlin. Some American publications have called it a "classic". Kevin Starr wrote in 2002 that Heavenly Discourse now seems "pedestrian and heavy-handed" but affirms that it was daring in its time.

== See also ==
- Christian anarchism
- Christian pacifism
