= William Cromer (died 1450) =

High Sheriff of Kent

Sir William Cromer
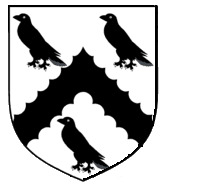
- Arms of Cromer: Argent, a chevron engrailed, between three crows, sable

High Sheriff of Kent
- In office 1444–1444
- Preceded by: Thomas Browne
- Succeeded by: John Thorneberry

Personal details
- Born: 1416 Tunstall, Kent, England
- Died: July 4, 1450 (aged 33–34) London, Middlesex, England
- Resting place: London, England

Sir William Cromer or Crowmer (1416 – July 4, 1450) was the High Sheriff of Kent in 1444. He was the son of former Lord Mayor of London William Cromer.

== Biography ==
Very little is known about William's early life. However, it is known that he was born in Tunstall sometime in 1416 to his father Sir William Cromer and Lady Margaret Squery when she was only 17. He married a woman named Elizabeth Fiennes by 1435 in Herstmonceux, East Sussex. Her exact date of birth is unknown, however she is believed to have been 15 when they married. They had one son named James Cromer c. 1435-1440, his exact birth and death date is unknown. In 1444, William rose to the position of High Sheriff of Kent.

When Jack Cade's Rebellion broke out in 1450 both William and his father-in-law James Fiennes, 1st Baron Saye and Sele were captured and imprisoned in the Tower of London. James was later beheaded after a sham trial at Guildhall and William was executed outside the London Wall by rebels.

After William's death, later that same year it is said that Elizabeth married Alexander Iden. The man who captured Jack Cade himself on July 12, 1450. Alexander would also become the High Sheriff of Kent in 1456. Elizabeth would marry a third time to Sir Lawrence Raynsford who would become the High Sheriff of Essex in 1465 and High Sheriff of Wiltshire in 1470.
