= William Cromer =

Mayor of London and sheriff (1386–1434)

Sir William Cromer
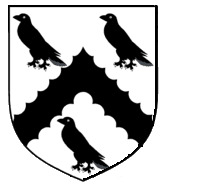
- Arms of Cromer: Argent, a chevron engrailed, between three crows, sable

Sheriff of the City of London
- In office 1405–1406
- Preceded by: William Lowste, Stephen Spylman
- Succeeded by: Nicholas Wotton, Godfrey Brooke

Lord Mayor of London
- In office 1413–1414
- Preceded by: William Walderne
- Succeeded by: Thomas Fauconer
- In office 1423–1424
- Preceded by: William Walderne
- Succeeded by: John Michell

Personal details
- Born: 1386 Cromer, Norfolk, England
- Died: January 1434 (aged 47–48) London, England
- Resting place: St Martin Orgar, City of London

William Cromer (occasionally also spelt Crowmer) (1386 – January 1434) was an English Sheriff and Lord Mayor of London and a Member of Parliament for the city.

He was described as the son of John Cromer of Aldenham, Hertfordshire but was probably originally from Cromer, Norfolk. By 1390 he had settled in London, where he became a prosperous merchant.

William had a son also named William Cromer in 1416 who became the High Sheriff of Kent in 1444.

He was Warden of the Drapers Company by 1394, and again in 1428–29. He was appointed Auditor for London for 1399-1400 and 1409–11 and elected an alderman of Billingsgate Ward by 1403 until after July 1420 and of Candlewick Ward from 1420 until his death. He was elected a Sheriff of London in 1405–06 alongside Henry Barton and Lord Mayor of London for 1413–14 and 1423–24.

During his public life he benefitted from a number of profitable commissions from 1407 onwards, when he was also elected to Parliament as member for the City of London (1407, 1417 and May 1421).
