= Gold mining in Scotland =

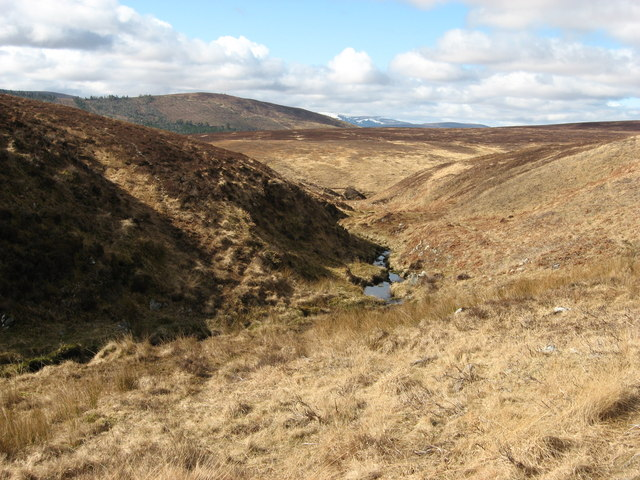
The Gold Burn at Kildonan, Sutherland

Gold has been mined in Scotland for centuries. There was a short-lived gold rush in 1852 at Auchtermuchty and Kinnesswood, and another in 1869 at Baile An Or on the Kildonan burn in Helmsdale in Sutherland. There have been several attempts to run commercial mines. In the Lowther Hills, Leadhills, and Wanlockhead areas gold prospecting and the extraction of lead metal went hand in hand. From 1424, under the Royal Mines Act, until 1592, gold and silver mined in Scotland were deemed to belong to the crown. The 1592 Act vested rights for gold, silver, lead, copper, tin, and other minerals in the king's feudal tenants or other leaseholders, who would pay 10% of any profit to the crown. The Act also established a Master of Metals as a crown officer, a position held from June 1592 by Lord Menmuir. followed by Thomas Hamilton of Monkland in March 1607.

== Medieval records ==
In 1125 David I of Scotland gave his tenth share of gold mining profits in Fife and Fothrik to Dunfermline Abbey. Fothrik was an area west of Fife, extending towards the Ochils and Alloa. In 1424, James I declared by act of Parliament that gold or silver, and lead ore rich in silver, belonged to the crown, as was customary in other kingdoms.

== 16th century ==
Mines were opened in 1502 during the reign of James IV of Scotland. The chronicle of Boece and Bellenden mentions the success of the mines of James IV in Clydesdale where gold and azure, a blue copper mineral, were found with little labour. James IV sent his Italian alchemist John Damian to view the workings at Crawfurdmuir in March 1513.

The French-born governor or Regent of Scotland, John Stewart, Duke of Albany had a medallion minted from Scottish gold from Crawford Muir in Lanarkshire. Albany employed a French refiner called John Drane. The register of the Privy Seal for 1516 records activity related to precious metals. In February 1516, William Cockburn of Skirling was permitted to employ 24 miners at Crawfordmuir. In March 1516, the infant James V of Scotland and Regent Albany leased rights to mine for gold, silver, tin and other metals on Crawford Moor and other places to Patrick Hamilton of Kincavil. In April 1516, an Edinburgh merchant James MacCalzen was given a pardon or remission for exporting newly mined gold and silver or coined bullion, which was an infringement of an Act of Parliament. His remission also included the crime of clipping coins.

In December 1525 or January 1526, Gunther von Lauichz, a servant of Christian II of Denmark and the German Joachim Hochstetter, were sent to prospect for gold. John Carmichael younger of Meadowflat undertook to help support their rights. Hochstetter and his brothers made a contract with the king's guardian, Archibald Douglas, 6th Earl of Angus (husband of Margaret Tudor), to mint Scotland's silver coinage, but were subsequently employed by Henry VIII at the Combe Martin silver mines. They left after a short period to work in Hungary.

As an adult ruler, James V encouraged further efforts, and had personal jewellery made from Scottish "gold of the mine". James Hamilton of Finnart was paid for three ounces of (presumably) Scottish gold in 1533, which was used to repair the crown. The Captain of Crawford was paid £840 for "gold of the mine". The Edinburgh goldsmith John Mosman was involved. In 1539 French-speaking miners arrived from the Duchy of Lorraine sent by the Duchess of Guise, and Mosman paid their expenses from Edinburgh to the mines at Crawford Moor and for their equipment. The royal accounts specify that many pieces made by Mosman were fashioned from Scottish gold. In 1538 Mosman made a hat badge featuring a mermaid, set with diamonds, from the "Kingis awne gold". Mosman was paid for a nugget of gold, "unwrocht gold of the mynde", that was sent to the Duke of Guise, the father of the queen consort Mary of Guise. Mosman added 41 ounces of Scottish gold to the royal crown now kept at Edinburgh Castle.

James V and Mary of Guise came to Crawford in July 1541 bringing tapestry to furnish their lodging at Crawford Castle. George Carmichael, son of the Captain of Crawford, presented three ounces of gold to the queen. James V used, or hoped to use, Scottish gold for his prestigious issues of coinage, and so promote the regal image of the Scottish monarchs in Europe.

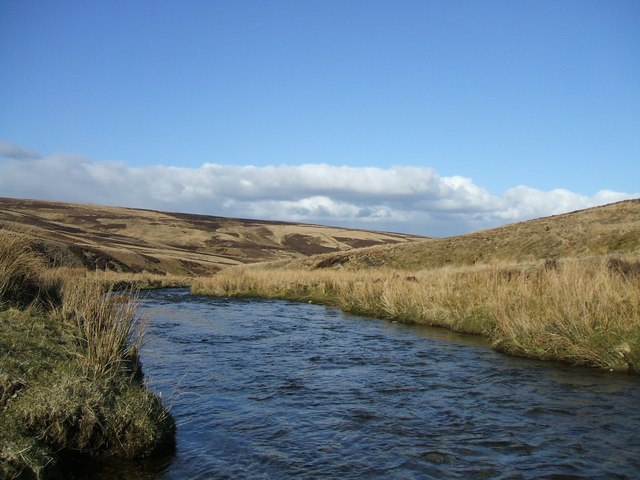
English prospectors Bevis Bulmer and George Bowes found gold near the Elvan water in the Lowther Hills.

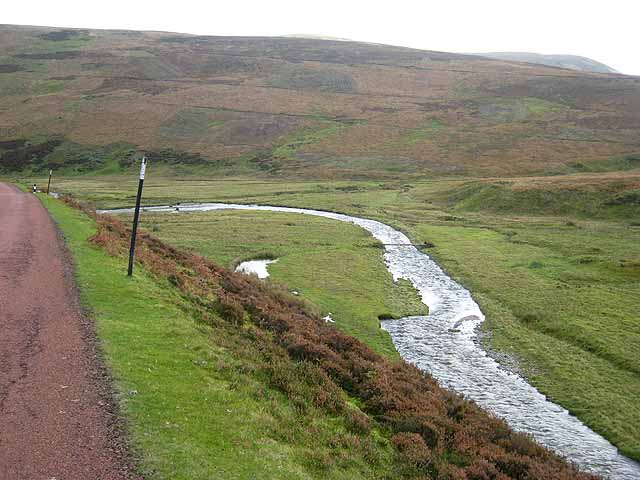
George Douglas of Parkhead was said to have been killed by a landslide at his mine near Shortcleuch water while searching for gold.

The chronicle writer John Lesley mentioned the activities of Dutch or German miners around the year 1541, who had permission from James V to prospect for gold, and after several weeks processed ore from veins at "Crauford mure" into round balls or globules which they exported for further refining. According to Lesley, they exported the ore mainly to protect their interests and investment. Later prospectors doubted the presence of veins of gold.

=== Reign of Mary, Queen of Scots ===
In December 1546, during the war known as the Rough Wooing, an English border official Thomas Warton wrote to Thomas Wriothesley about gold-mining in Scotland at Crawford Moor, offering to investigate the ground. Wharton recalled a conversation with the Scottish ambassador Adam Otterburn, who said that James IV had mines but only found loose pieces of gold or gold ore rather than a vein, and had spent more on the work than he recovered. Wharton owned one of the gold medallions coined by Albany, said to be minted from Scottish gold.

Mary of Guise wrote for French miners to search silver and gold in 1549. Regent Arran had French miners operating a lead mine on Craufordmuir in 1553. The Privy Council of England discussed the subject of Scottish gold at "Crafordmore" in June 1553. In January 1554, Henri Cleutin considered the need to increase revenue from Scottish fisheries and mines in the context of the marriage of Mary, Queen of Scots.

Mary of Guise became Regent of Scotland, and English miners were sent to Craufordmuir to prospect for gold in July 1554, supported by Robert Carmichael. She paid for five ounces of "gold of the mine" in August and this was delivered to the mint and recorded as "auri Scoticani". In October 1555 John Carmichael, young Captain of Crauford, was given £560 Scots to buy gold from the miners for Mary of Guise. Some of the gold was delivered to John Misserve, an English worker in the mint who was also described as the "Inglis mynour". He was given a licence to prospect for gold and silver in June 1556. He would sell lead produced during refining to Mary of Guise. He was later discovered to be a counterfeiter of Scottish money.

A short guide to Scottish law, the Discours Particulier D'Escosse, written in French by John Bellenden and James MacGill in 1559, explains that the profits from gold mines and silver mines in Scotland, and the royal mint, were understood to belong to the crown, and a proportionate tax was levied. Lead had a different legal status, but because silver was routinely extracted from lead ore its mining rights were also reserved to the crown.

Charles Forrest and Thomas Phillop were managing a mine for Mary, Queen of Scots in the summer of 1562. John Stewart of Tarlair, with his son William, were licensed to mine for gold and other metals north of the River Tay to Orkney in March 1546. They were allowed timber from the royal woods for any buildings, and were to sell any gold or silver produced to the royal mint. They were not mine or dig coal pits within ten miles of the royal palaces.

A Dutch miner Cornelius de Vos, a shareholder in the English Company of Mines Royal, came to Scotland in 1566 to prospect for gold. De Vos went to consult with colleagues in Keswick in England, bringing a sample of ore and arousing suspicions. Thomas Thurland reported the find to William Cecil in October. De Vos made contracts for mines and making salt with Mary, Queen of Scots, and her two husbands, Lord Darnley and Bothwell.

De Vos's mining contracts were renewed by Mary's half-brother, Regent Moray. Another prospector at Keswick, George Nedham, reported that Cornelius de Vos corresponded with Daniel Hochstetter in October 1568, asking him to make assays of ores and send skilled workmen to Scotland. The miners of Keswick were reluctant to get involved, and Nedham wrote to the merchant Lionel Duckett for advice and to know if Elizabeth I was supportive, considering the political instability in Scotland. Nedham asked Duckett to keep the business secret and ask the courtier John Tamworth to get the Queen's opinion. In Scotland, Cornelius de Vos was said to have employed men and women, "both ladds and lasses", who otherwise might have begged for a living. Later mineral entrepreneurs and diplomats also stressed the benefits of employment offered by mines.

=== Reign of James VI ===
During the rule of Regent Morton who governed Scotland for the young James VI in the 1570s, English and Dutch miners prospected for gold, including Eustachius Roche. According to Stephen Atkinson, a colleague of Bevis Bulmer, the painters Arnold Bronckorst and Nicholas Hilliard came to Scotland in company with Cornelius de Vos. Atkinson may have got this story from the prospector George Bowes, whose father Sir George Bowes was involved with the acquisition of a portrait of James VI in 1579.

Archibald Napier of Merchiston and Regent Morton's favourite George Auchinleck of Balmanno signed a contract with a Flemish miner Abraham Peterson to work certain gold, silver, copper, and lead mines, for the space of twelve years, excluding lead mines already managed by Morton's relative George Douglas of Parkhead. Refined silver and gold would be sold to the master of the mint, the "Maister Cunyeour", John Acheson. A number of German miners arrived in June 1574. The gold mines were regarded as the property of the crown, and in July 1576 a proclamation was made at Edinburgh, Lanark, Peebles, and the mining districts of Cawformure, Robertmure, and Henderland (near Cappercleuch), to the effect no one should sell gold to Scottish people or foreigners ("strangearis"), but only to the Master Coiner.

The mines opened by George Douglas of Parkhead came to be managed a goldsmith and financier, Thomas Foulis in the 1590s. In June 1592, the Parliament of Scotland created a new office, the Master of Metals, to have charge of mines, refining, and crown income from mining. John Lindsay of Menmuir was appointed. A surviving letter from this time shows that Douglas of Parkhead's wife Marion Douglas managed a lead mine.

Thomas Foulis had a tack or lease of the gold mines in "Crauford and Robert Muires" in 1595. Custom or duty from the gold extracted due to James VI, under the terms of the 1592 Act, amounted to £666-13s-6d Scots. Foulis was trusted to spend this sum on the king's behalf along with the subsidy granted to James VI by Elizabeth I, and provided jewellery to the king. The English prospector George Bowes, a nephew of the ambassador Robert Bowes, made an arrangement to work with Foulis, but Elizabeth I disapproved. Another English entrepreneur Bevis Bulmer formed a partnership with Foulis. In 1598, an English inventor or speculator Gavin Smith and a Scottish goldsmith and mint official James Aitcheson or Achesoun developed a pump for mining works.

A Catholic exile, Thomas Morison, published Liber novus de Metallorum causis et Transubstantione (Frankfurt: Ioannem Wechelum, 1593), a work dedicated to James VI, and directed against alchemists and astrologers. The book mentions the purity of gold found at Craufurd and in other well-known valleys.

== 17th century ==
After the Union of the Crowns, George Bowes worked with Bulmer, who eventually acquired his mining interests. Bowes sent a progress report from Leadhills on 10 December 1603 to the Earl of Suffolk. They had seen trays washes with gold in two locations, where Archibald Napier of Merchiston had previously found gold, despite poor weather. Bowes thought the geology was promising, even if there was no vein of gold, only gold found by washing, and the lead and copper would be profitable. Bowes sent a second report on 22 December, outlining the observations that led him to think there might not be a vein of gold. He noted that the Laird of Merchiston had found gold by washing in the Pentland Hills, on Crawford Moor, and by Megget Water, but there were no reports of a vein. As many as 300 people had been employed in washing for gold near Leadhills. Nevertheless, the geology was promising, and the Laird of Merchiston had shown him a stray find of gold admixed in "spar" as if it came from vein. A veteran miner had told him that his father had been a labourer for German miners 90 years before, and they had found a vein of gold (apparently in the time of Regent Albany). Bowes was anxious to secure funding from the (English) Privy Council and had to meet their conditions. He mentioned that employing people as gold washers was a good policy, because they could labour in a mine when a vein was a found.

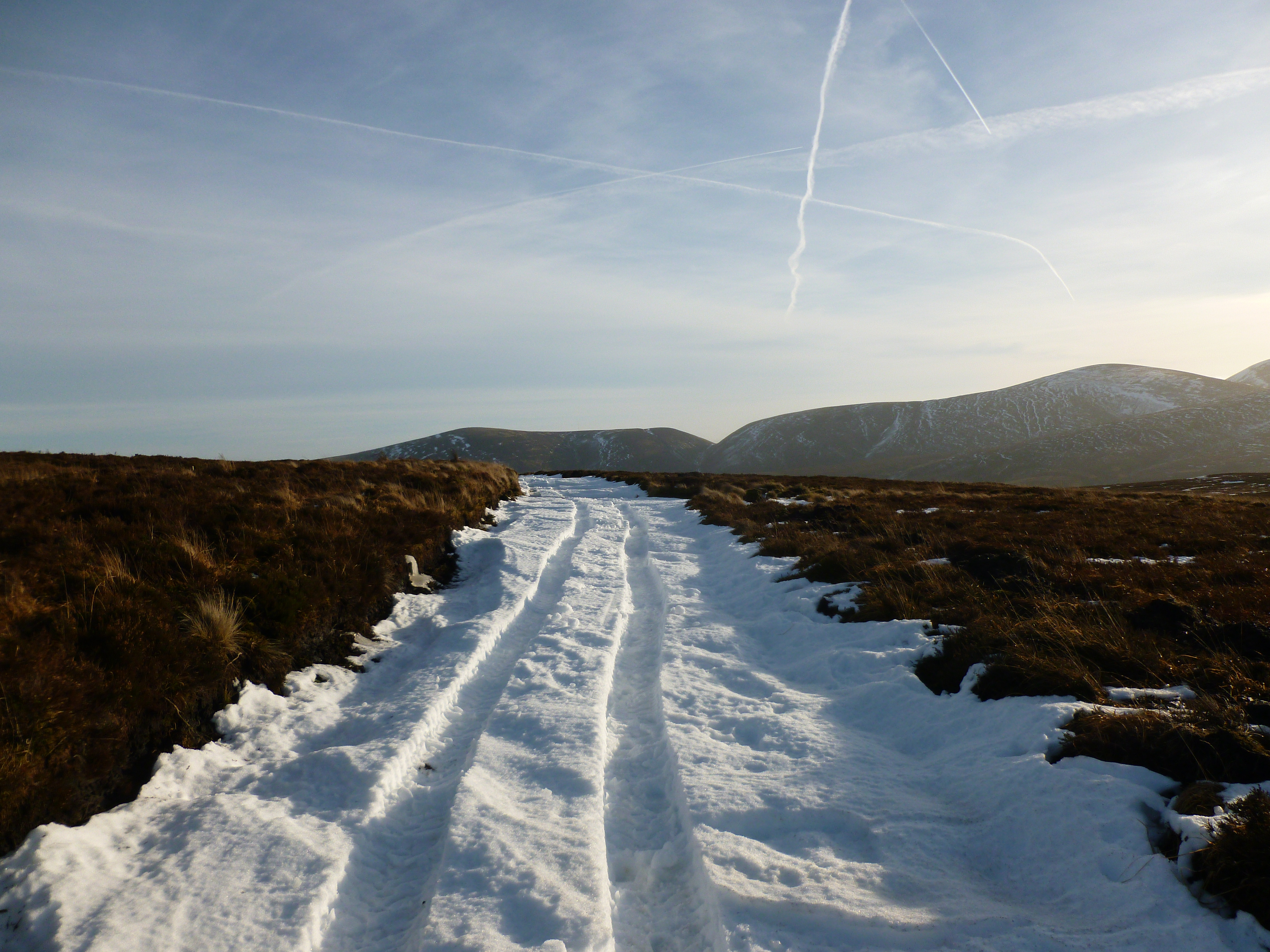
Bulmer Moss, north of Leadhills, in 1605 Bevis Bulmer worked at least two sites to the west and east of the moss.

A paper on gold mining in Scotland, partly burnt in the Cotton library fire, repeats similar information and discussion about veins and washed gold. It was probably compiled at this time by George Bowes. Bowes got funding to continue, receiving £100 for working minerals at "Winlockwater" on 7 February 1603, while Bevis Bulmer got £200 for his discoveries of Scottish gold. "Bulmer the Alchemist" brought samples of Scottish gold ore to London in January 1604. Sceptics doubted that gold could "engender" in Scotland's cold climate.

In January 1605, it was said that Bulmer had brought back enough drops and gobbets of pure gold "without dross" to make a cup for King James. The cup was near completion in September. Bulmer had 102 men working at Bailiegill Stanes, Langcleuch Stanes, Alway Stanes, and Glenlaugh Stanes. The Bailgill or Bellgall is a stream in the Glengonnar valley north of Leadhills, draining "Bulmer Moss", and Long Cleuch is to the east. Bulmer seems to describe the rising of the Bellgall and Longcleuch streams in a letter of November 1606, as locations at the "head of two several brooks".

In February 1605 the Venetian ambassador Nicolò Molin described Bowes' progress. Molin noted that Bowes had told Queen Elizabeth about gold mines in Scotland, but she had arrested him. Bowes had found support from King James and produced 25 ounces of gold but with large costs, and was losing investors and supporters.

Silver was discovered on lands at Hilderston near Bathgate in 1607. Bevis Bulmer and Thomas Foulis opened a silver mine called "God's Blessing". The site at Hilderston was developed by Bulmer, as the "governor of the works of his majesty's mines under ground", with George Bruce of Carnock acting as treasurer. In 1613 Foulis obtained the contract for the mine with William Alexander of Menstrie and Paulo Pinto from Portugal.

Stephen Atkinson worked at Hilderston. He wrote a speculative tract or prospectus on gold mining in Scotland in 1619, based on his experiences with Bevis Bulmer, the reports written by Bowes, and anecdotes he had heard of earlier miners. This was printed in the 19th century and has often been quoted by historians. Atkinson wrote that Bowes had found a vein of gold in Elizabeth's reign, although Bowes's letters don't mention such a find.

In 1626 Charles I gave a licence to Andrew Huntar of Aberdeen to prospect for precious stones, silver, and gold in the lands north of the River Dee and take samples for assay. A beam engine installed at Wanlockhead in 1870 forms the centrepiece of the Museum of Lead Mining, where the history of gold mining in the region is also interpreted.

== Present day ==
More recently gold deposits in quartz were discovered at Cononish Farm on Beinn Chùirn near Tyndrum at the northern end of the Loch Lomond and The Trossachs National Park. Lead and zinc had been mined in the area in the 17th and 18th centuries. After gaining planning permissions and making commitments to ecological conservation and mitigation in Glen Cononish in 2011, the gold mine continues to develop.

A vein of quartz includes pyrites and sulphide compounds which may carry gold inclusions. Material extracted from the mine is reduced and ground down on site, and sent abroad for refining. Research is taking place in the use of plants to recover gold and other metal traces from the mining spoil and wastes generated at Tyndrum, a process known as phytomining, a kind of phytoextraction process. The Tyndrum workings are operated by Scotgold Resources. After a period of uncertainty, the company went into administration in November 2023.
