= Thomas Thurland =

Thomas Thurland was Master of the Savoy Hospital in London and a mining entrepreneur. His family was from Nottinghamshire.

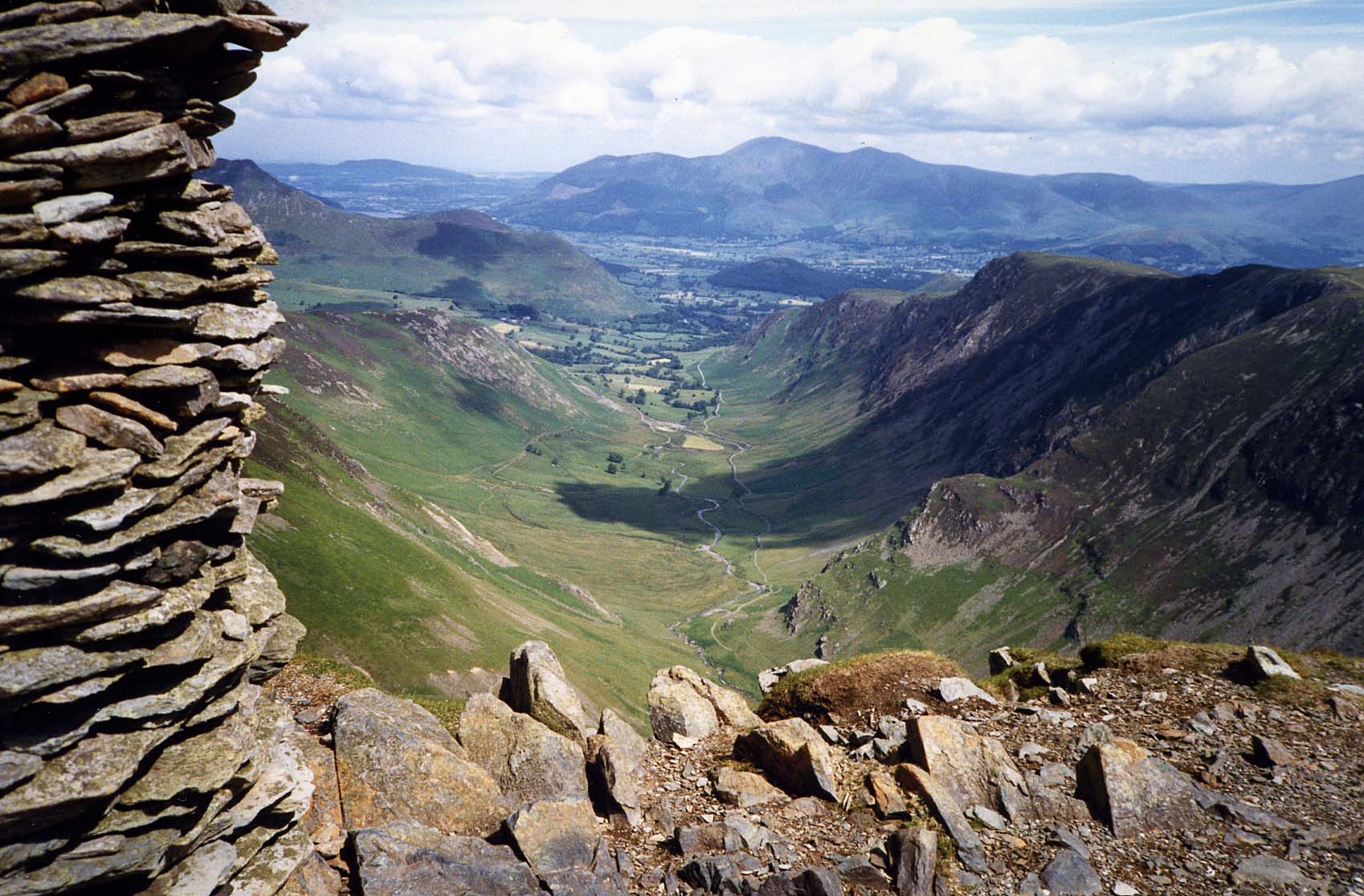
Newlands Valley in Cumbria

== Partnerships and mines ==
In 1564, Elizabeth I granted Thurland and Sebastian Spydell, and then Thurland and a German partner Daniel Hochstetter a patent to mine and refine gold, copper, silver, and mercury (quicksilver), in England and Wales. Hochstetter was an associate of an Augsburg partnership, David Haug and Hans Langnauer. They were allowed 24 partners or investors. This arrangement was dissolved in 1577.

The copper mines at Keswick were at first a success. The mines were located at Newlands in the parish of Crosthwaite in Allerdale. Thurland, known as the Provost of the Mines, wrote to William Cecil, a shareholder, about the successes, sending plans of the works and smelting house, and mentioning that Daniel Hechstetter had to buy more timber to prop up the workings at Newlands because the seam was so large. Some of the timber was brought from Ireland.

In October 1566, Thurland was approached at Keswick by a Dutch prospector Cornelius de Vos who brought a sample of gold ore from Scotland. Cornelius was a shareholder in the Company of Mines Royal, but Thurland was not pleased by this development and reported the find to the Company of Mines Royal. Thurland wrote to Queen Elizabeth in alarmist terms about "secret practices with merchant strangers and by some foreign princes to have of the Scottish queen (Mary, Queen of Scots) the mines in Crawford Moor nigh adjoining to your majesty's west borders", mines he hoped to work himself.

Stephen Atkinson, who later wrote about gold mines in Scotland, claimed to have worked with Thurland's partner Daniel Hochstetter. Atkinson said that Hochstetter had told him of injuries suffered by George Bowes (or his brother Robert Bowes) in an accident in a Cumbrian copper mine.

== Challenges ==
The Earl of Northumberland disputed their right to the copper and sent men to occupy the works in October 1569. Arguments were made that copper, a base metal, was not usually reserved to the crown. The courts decided that the monarch possessed the mineral rights and Thurland and Hechstetter's patent was valid.

Despite Thurland's upbeat reports, the venture proved financially unsuccessful, due to high costs and low copper prices. The German and English workers quarrelled. Thurland's ideas of discipline did not create respect. One German mine manager, Hans Loner, wrote that Daniel Hochstetter had insisted on using older methods and technology.

Thurland was dismissed from the Savoy Hospital in 1570 for misappropriating funds and property to pay his personal debts.Thurland's copper mining speculations had led to him being arrested for debt in the 1560s. The Dean of Westminster, Gabriel Goodman, obtained a chalice and patten from Thurland and delivered it to the royal Jewel House.

Mining work in the Newlands and Keswick continued, managed by a local landowner Richard Dudley of Yanwath, and George Nedham. From 1581, some technological improvements were trialled by Joachim Gans from Prague. He used methods outlined by Lazarus Ercker.

== Later years ==
After accusations of embezzlement, Thurland was succeeded as Master of the Savoy by William Mount in 1575.
