= Arnold Bronckorst =

Flemish or Dutch painter

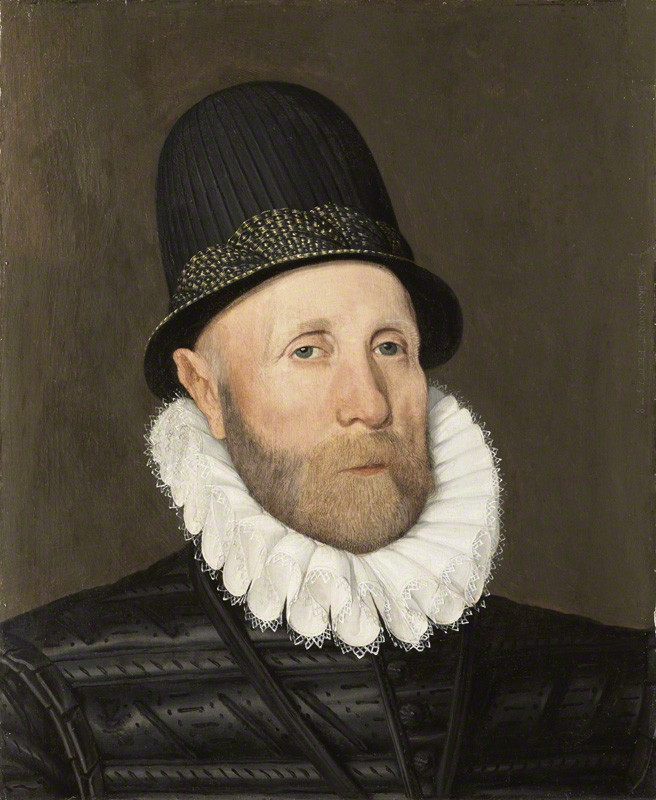
Oliver St John, 1st Baron St John of Bletso, signed and dated 1578 by Arnold Bronckorst.

Arnold Bronckhorst, or Bronckorst or Van Bronckhorst (fl. 1565–1583) was a Flemish or Dutch painter who was the court painter to James VI of Scotland.

Arnold's origins are unknown, and it is unclear if he was a member of the Dutch noble family of Van Bronckhorst.

== Goldmining story ==
According to an account of gold mining in Scotland by Stephen Atkinson written in 1619, Bronckorst was working in London as an associate of the English painter Nicholas Hilliard. With a painter or prospector, Cornelius de Vos, Bronckhorst went to Scotland to invest in gold mining, meeting Regent Morton. According to Atkinson, Hilliard invested in the mine, and Bronckhorst went to Edinburgh to negotiate the sale of gold to the mint, unsuccessfully. However, he was hired by Morton to paint portraits "great and small" of the young king, James VI and I.

There is no further evidence for Hilliard's involvement in the venture. Cornelius de Vos is documented as a mineral prospector in Scotland in this period, prospecting for gold and salt with colleagues including John Achillay, but not as a painter. Cornelius de Vos was made to review and lost his mining contract in 1575, which may reflect Atkinson's description of Bronckhorst negotiating with Regent Morton on behalf of de Vos.

=== Early portraits of James VI ===
There is a record of a 'French painter' who made a portrait of the King in September 1573, during Morton's regency, for £10. In September 1574, a portrait miniature of James VI was sent from Scotland to the French ambassador in London, Bertrand de Salignac de la Mothe-Fénelon, to forward as a gift to James' mother, Mary, Queen of Scots.

== Paintings and records ==
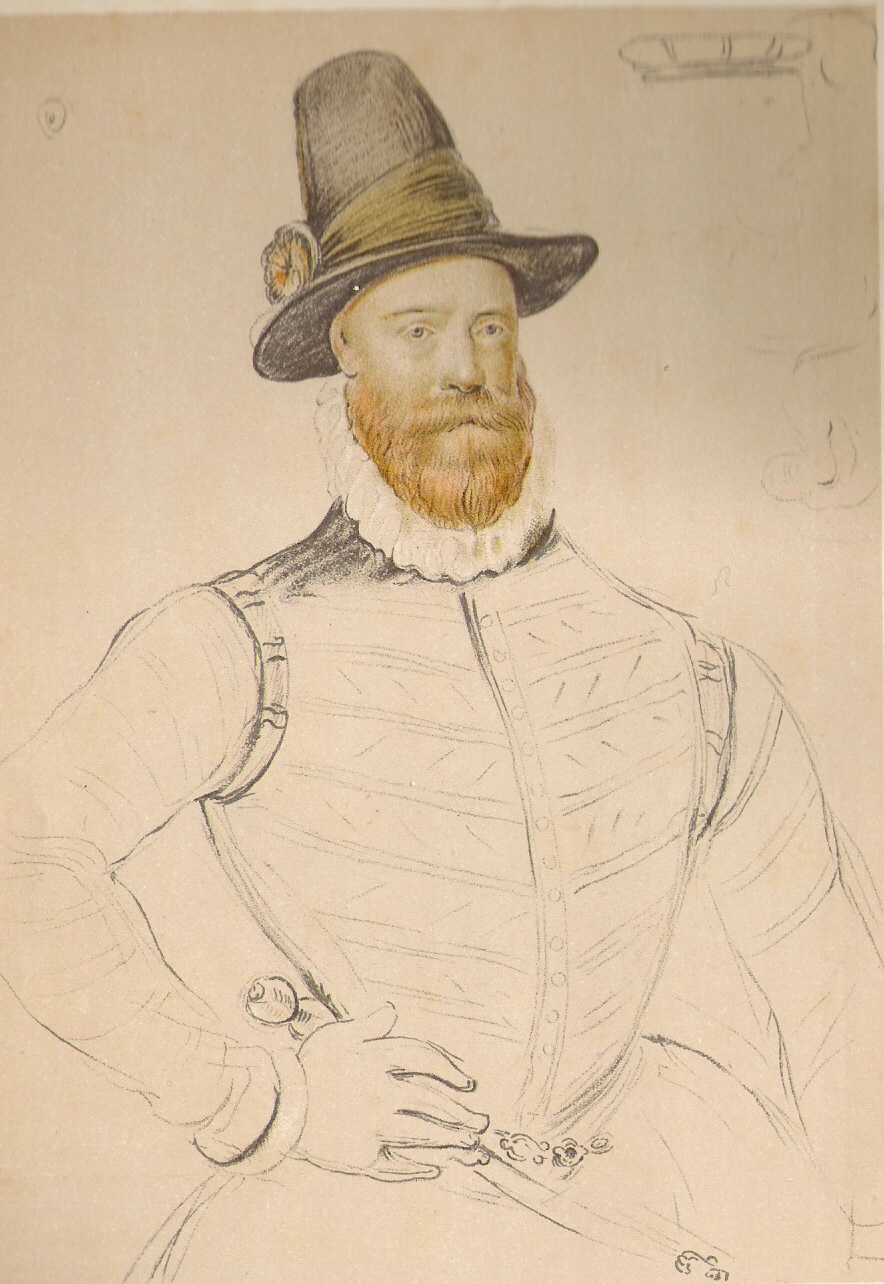
Regent Morton c. 1580, by Arnold Bronckorst (drawing)

In England, a painter called "Arnold" was paid £4-6s-10d for a portrait of Henry Sidney in 1565. In Scotland, Arnold painted the King, Regent Morton, George Buchanan, and the Earl of Arran. According to the inventories of the Earl of Leicester, the earl had a portrait of the 'young king of Scots' in 1580, which may have been a copy of Arnold's picture. Leicester sent his own portrait to James VI, painted on canvas by Hubbard in 1583.

=== Scottish records ===
Arnold Bronkhorst was paid £130 Scots for portraits of James VI in April 1580. He was given 100 merks in September 1580 as a reward for relocating to Scotland, and paid £64 for two portraits of James VI and a painting of George Buchanan, the king's former tutor. Payment was delayed, and the bill was annotated in Scots by Bronkhorst "quhairof I have resavit as zit na payement". He received a corresponding payment of £64 Scots in the last months of 1580 as "Maistir Arnold paynter to the Kingis majestie" from the profits of the royal mint.

Bronckhorst's appointment as the King's painter was confirmed by privy seal letter on 19 September 1581 when the King was at Glasgow Castle. His pension was £100 yearly for life. On the same day a precept for payment for two portraits costing £46 was issued. One of these was a portrait of James VI intended to be sent abroad.

=== James VI sits for a portrait at Stirling Castle ===
Sittings for the King's picture by the "Flemish painter", probably Arnold, at Stirling Castle during the difficult political circumstances in 1579 were mentioned in letters sent to George Bowes in England, the brother of the diplomat Robert Bowes, by Archibald Douglas or John Colville. The letters were signed with a cipher "4°". The originals of these letters were formerly held in the archives of Streatlam Castle.

The portrait, a "portratur", was destined for Robert Bowes to give to Queen Elizabeth. The writer of the letter, Colville or Douglas, supervised the painter and the sittings, and sent the picture to England in June;

The Flemish painter is in Stirling, in working of the King's portraiture, but expelled forth of the place at the beginnings of thir (these) troubles. I am presently travelling (working) to obtain him license to see the King's presence thrice in the day, till the end of his work; quhilk (which) will be no sooner perfected nor nine days, after the obtaining of this license ...

the king our sovereign's portraiture, according to his proportion in all parts, which has been so long in making, and so difficult in getting, that I have been almost wearied therewith.

A son of George Bowes, also called George, was later sent into Scotland as a mineral prospector at Wanlockhead in 1603 with Sir Bevis Bulmer, which may relate to Stephen Atkinson's gold-mining story. By September 1580, Arnold had completed a half and full length of the king and a portrait of George Buchanan for £64.

=== Royal appointment ===
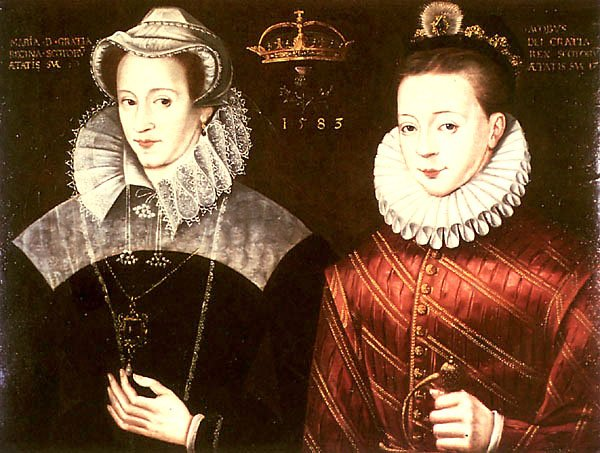
A double portrait at Blair Castle of Mary, Queen of Scots and James VI by an anonymous artist, dated 1583, may reflect plans for Mary to return to Scotland and rule in "association" with her son

On 19 September 1581 Arnold was appointed to the post of King's Painter, the first such appointment in Scotland. He received a privy seal letter of appointment guaranteeing the payment for life of £100 yearly from the "reddiast of his hienes' casualties and cofferis," meaning the treasurer was to make Arnold's payment a priority. The privy seal letter and account entries describe him as a flemyng.

Bronckorst returned to London in 1583 where he disappears from view. He was succeeded as court painter in Scotland by another Flemish artist, Adrian Vanson. Vanson was first recorded working in Scotland in June 1581, and appointed as the king's painter in May 1584.

On 31 October 1582, Mary, Queen of Scots, wrote to the French ambassador Michel de Castelnau in cipher code about a new type of portrait of James VI that he had sent her, apparently by a different artist, and presumably differing from the pictures made by Arnold Bronckorst.

One portrait signed and dated 1578 by Bronckorst survives; the English sitter Oliver St John of Bletso, was the father of a reluctant keeper and juror of Mary Queen of Scots.

== Scots portraits ==
The National Galleries of Scotland hold a number of portraits by Bronckorst:

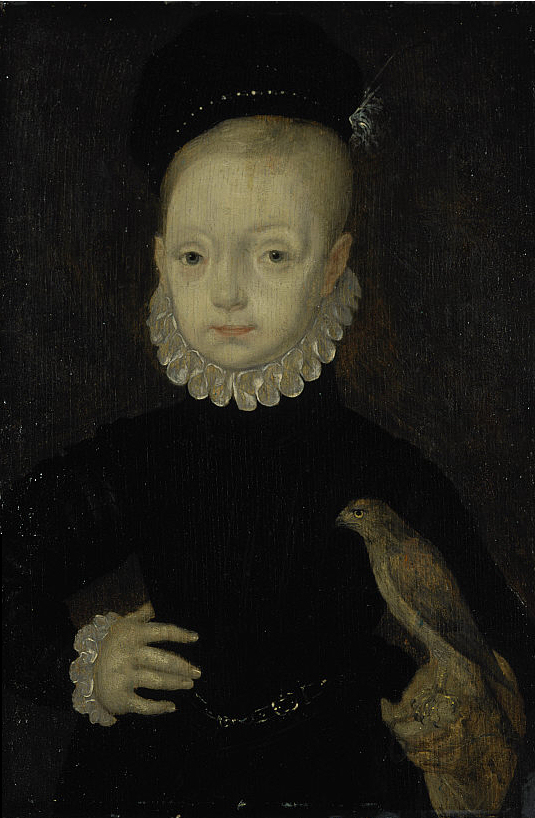
James VI, about 1574

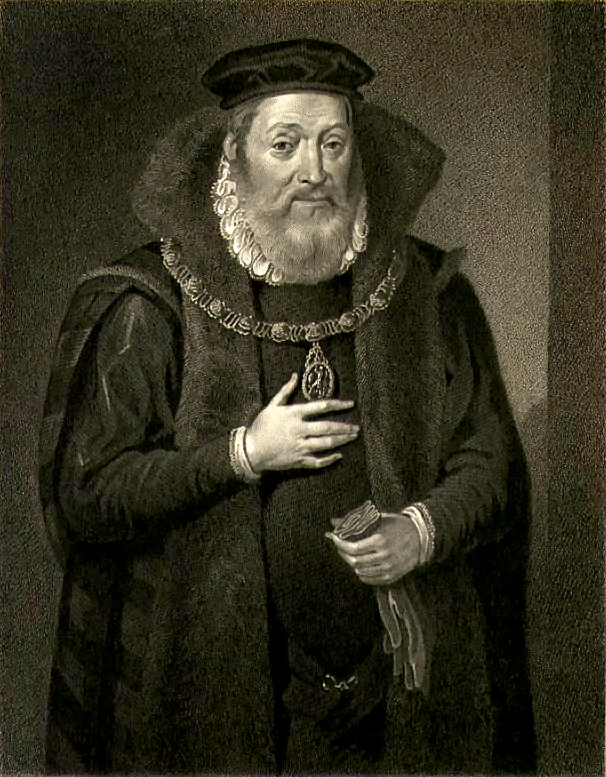
Regent Arran, print after Arnold Bronckorst, about 1574

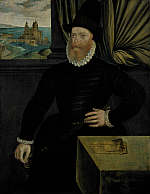
Regent Morton, about 1580

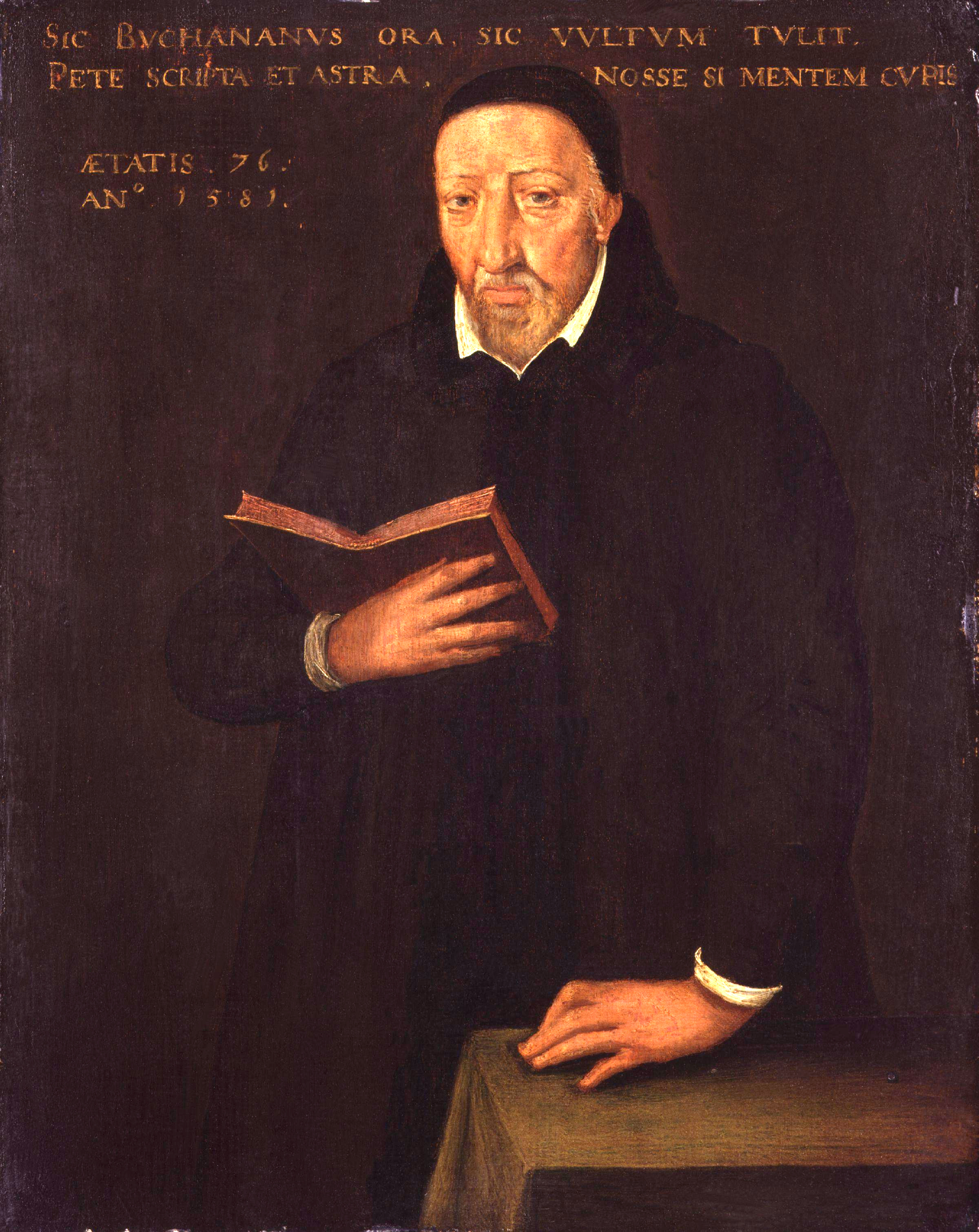
George Buchanan, about 1581

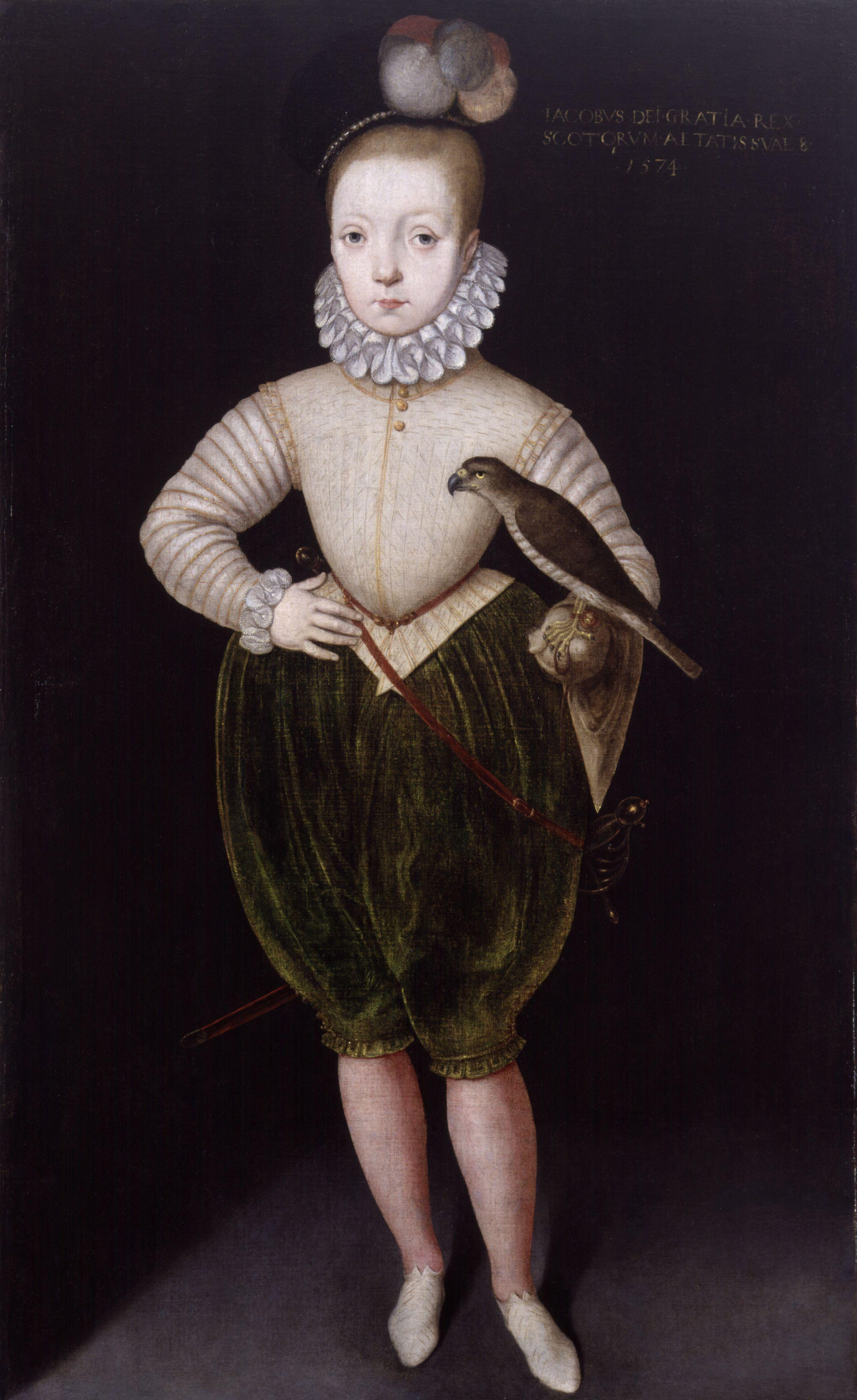
James VI in 1574, after picture
attributed to Arnold Bronckorst

Preceded by Pierre Quesnel	Painter at the Scottish royal court 1580–1583	Succeeded by Adrian Vanson
