= Cornelius de Vos =

Dutch or Flemish mine entrepreneur and mineral prospector

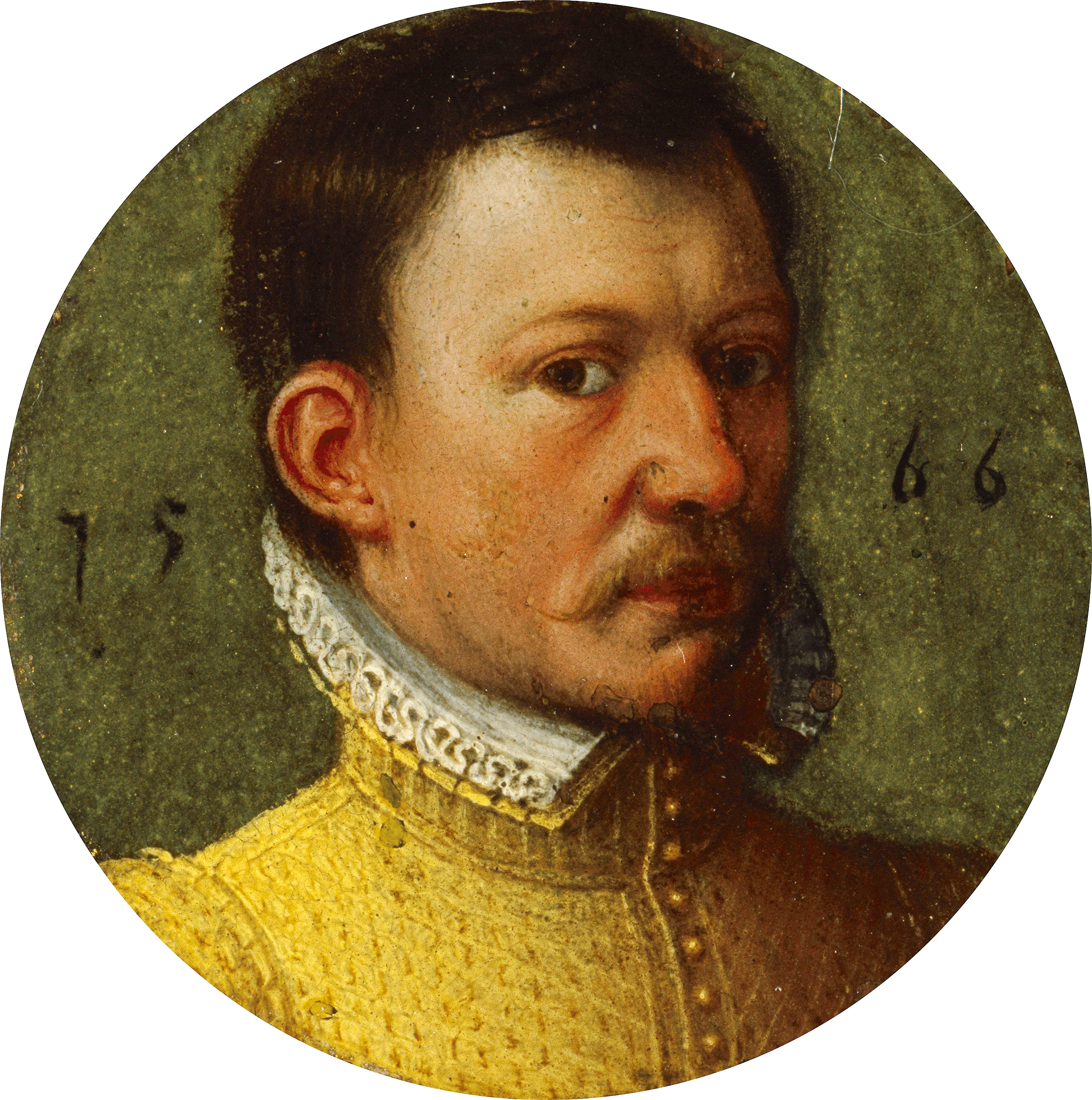
The Earl of Bothwell, who signed a contract for Cornelius de Vos, painted by an unknown artist in 1566

Cornelius de Vos or de Vois or Devosse (fl. 1565-1585), was a Dutch or Flemish mine entrepreneur and mineral prospector working in England and Scotland. He was said to have been a "picture-maker" or portrait artist. De Vos is known for gold mining in Scotland and founding saltworks at Newhaven near Edinburgh.

== Career ==
In 1558 Cornelius de Vos was in London, and married Helen, the widow of a butcher, Nicholas Howe, and John Gylmyne. He was recorded as a member of the French church in Farringdon in 1568.

De Vos was granted rights to mine and make copperas and alum in England on the Isle of Wight and in Devon by letters patent in 1564, and pursued mining concessions in Ireland. According to his rival for Irish mining rights, William Humfrey, Cornelius de Vos obtained patents for mine drainage methods previously granted to Burchard Kranich. He worked for James Blount, 6th Baron Mountjoy at Canford Cliffs in Dorset, with little success. His mining rights in Dorset and the Isle of Wight passed to John Engelberd in 1577.

== Searching for Scottish gold ==
Cornelius de Vos was a shareholder in the English Company of Mines Royal. He went prospecting for gold in Crawford Muir in Scotland in 1566. There was already competition, Mary, Queen of Scots and Lord Darnley had granted a concession to three Edinburgh burgesses, James Carmichael the warden of the mint, Master James Lyndsay, and Andrew Stevenson, while the mint-master John Acheson and John Aslowan were already working in Wanlockhead and Glengonnar.

In October 1566 Cornelius de Vos arrived in Keswick in Cumbria with an English and a Scottish partner (whose names are unknown). He brought a sample of sand in a napkin from the Scottish gold fields, found by a woman worker washing for gold, a "mayde of Scotlande". The German miners at Keswick tested the sample and told him the sand was rich in gold. The supervisor at Keswick, Thomas Thurland, noted this as suspicious activity, possibly against his or Company interests, and reported it to William Cecil. Thurland also wrote to Queen Elizabeth in alarmist terms about "secret practices with merchant strangers and by some foreign princes to have of the Scottish queen (Mary, Queen of Scots) the mines in Crawford Moor nigh adjoining to your majesty's west borders", mines he hoped to work himself. Thurland was in a partnership with a German miner, Daniel Houghstetter or Hechstetter, between 1565 and 1577, with 24 investors.

The Company of Mines Royal tried to get an interest in Scottish gold mining and panning from Mary, Queen of Scots. Meanwhile, Cornelius de Vos and his business partners, two London merchants Anthony Hickman and John Achillay, gained a permit to work salt at Newhaven from Mary and the Earl of Bothwell shortly after their marriage in May 1567. These salt works were revived by Eustachius Roche in 1592.

De Vos was awarded a traditional 19 year "tack" of the gold mines by Regent Moray in 1568. Cornelius appeared before the Privy Council of Scotland on 4 March 1568 to register his exclusive contract to work all the gold and silver mines in Scotland. He was obliged to start work before June 1569. If any lead, tin, or copper was found he was to extract it and pay the profits to the Scottish crown. For every hundred ounces of native gold or silver he was to pay eight ounces to the treasury, and four ounces for any metal that needed to be refined. He set up his own joint-stock company to recover the gold. Cornelius however still lacked knowledge of chemistry and mineralogy and, as reported by George Nedham, again had to send one of his workers, a Dutch miner called Rennius, to Daniel Hechstetter at Keswick to assay samples of sand.

Digging at Crawford Moor continued, but Regent Morton was unhappy with the contract. In June 1574 Morton went to Crawford Moor in person to see the workings and set miners to work. Cornelius de Vos approached the English ambassador Henry Killigrew in August 1574 with a message for William Cecil about the mines, presumably seeking investment and sponsorship. On 7 February 1575 Morton lent £500 to Cornelius de Vos and his three German or "Almain" partners, Abraham Peterson, Johnne Kelliner, and Helias Clutene.

In June 1575 Morton wrote to James MacGill of Nether Rankeillour, who was now Lord Clerk Register, who had witnessed the 1568 contract. He described the terms of his contract as "captious and doubtful in many points and nothing to the king's profit". Soon after, the mining concession was granted to one of de Vos' partners Abraham Peterson in February 1576. Peterson made proof coins for the mint in April 1576.

In 1580, although he had lost his political power, Morton received gold which was coined to the value of £678, possibly connected with mining. The goldmining concession was given to Thomas Foulis in 1594.

In London his relationship with Margriete van der Eertbrugghe came into scrutiny by the Dutch Church in October 1570. In 1573 he is known to have written letters to the Mayor of London, Lionel Duckett, and others via his cousin Arnold. As he is linked with the painter Arnold van Bronckorst in Stephen Atkinson's story, it has been suggested that this Arnold was the same person.

A "Cornelis Clewtinge de Vos", Dutchman, was buried at St Nicholas Acons in London on 11 December 1586, who was perhaps this mining entrepreneur. The name "Clewtinge" seems to be the surname of Helias Clutene, the partner of Cornelius in 1575. Mine entrepreneurs in Scotland of the next generation included George Douglas of Parkhead, George Bowes, and Bevis Bulmer.

== Stephen Atkinson's account of Cornelius de Vos in Scotland ==
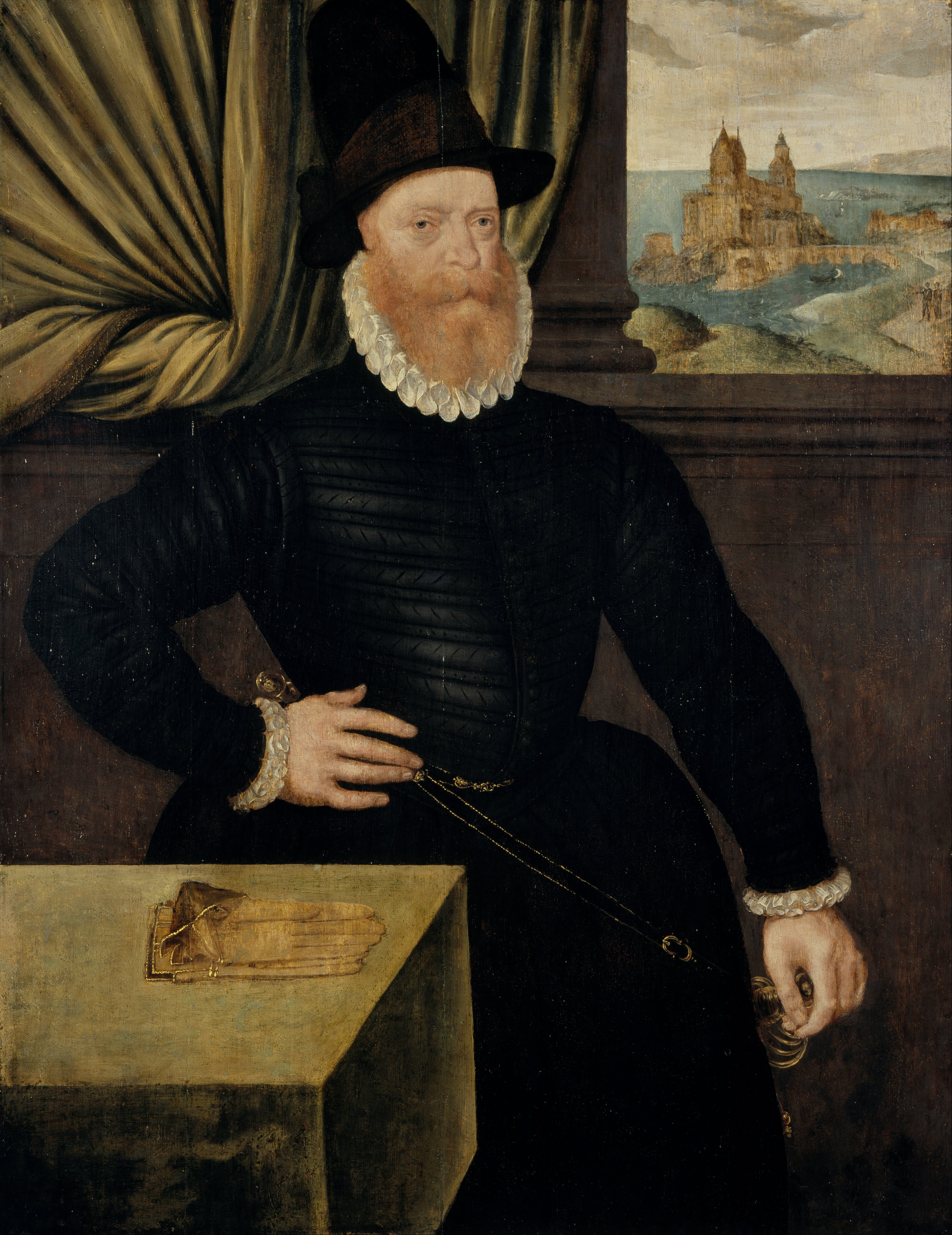
Regent Morton, attributed to Arnold Bronckhorst, a partner of Cornelius de Vos

In 1619 an English gold prospector Stephen Atkinson wrote a kind of historical prospectus for gold mining in Scotland. This includes the story of "Master Cornelius" or "Cornelius Devosse". Atkinson described Cornelius Devosse as "a most cunning picture maker, and excellent in art for the trial of mineral and mineral stones", although the archival record of his activity shows that he lacked lapidary or chemical knowledge and no other source mentions him as portrait painter. According to Atkinson, the painter Nicholas Hilliard invested in the Scottish gold mine with another painter Arnold Bronckhorst. The historian Elizabeth Goldring dates Hilliard's involvement to the years 1573 or 1574.

Atkinson's narrative seems in part based on hearsay but he describes using a "book of record" of Cornelius de Vos' mining operation at Crawford Moor and a record of the works of George Bowes. This seems to have been an account of wages. Atkinson says that he himself had worked with Daniel Hechstetter, the miner who Cornelius de Vos had consulted at Keswick. He wrote that Nicholas Hilliard, then still alive, would confirm that he also lost money in the venture.

Atkinson states that Cornelius de Vos went into Scotland with a recommendation from Elizabeth I of England, was given permission to prospect and found rich ore, which describes the events of October 1566. He gives the names of four partners in the enterprise; the Earl of Morton, "Robert Bellenden (Secretary of Scotland)" perhaps intending John Bellenden (Lord Justice Clerk), Abraham Peterson a Dutch man residing in Edinburgh, and James Reid an Edinburgh burgess.

Cornelius de Vos and his partners raised capital and he was given a commission by Regent Moray, (in March 1568). Atkinson says that Cornelius had 120 men at work and employed men and women, "lads and lasses, idle men and women", who had been begging before. Most of the gold was bought by the Scottish mint for coins. The mines were apparently worked by sub-contractors. Atkinson mentions a Scottish workman John Gibson of Crawford town who worked at "Glengaber Water" (Glengonnar), who he claims to have met, and another Dutch miner, Abraham Grey, who he found in the records. Grey, known as "Grey Beard", worked at Wanlockhead, (and sometimes said to be the same person as Abraham Peterson). Regent Morton had a basin made of Wanlockhead gold and presented it to the king of France, apparently to advertise Scotland's mineral wealth.

Atkinson takes up the subject of Cornelius de Vos again, as a story from the reign of Elizabeth, "some forty years past", after describing his own recent personal involvement with Scottish gold, Hilderston silver, and John Murray of the Bedchamber. In this version, a young Cornelius persuaded his friend the painter Nicholas Hilliard to join his Scottish goldmining venture. Hilliard sent his associate, Arnold Bronckhorst, a painter and mineralogist, into Scotland. Hilliard's efforts and influence secured a patent for Cornelius de Vos, (perhaps meaning a letter of recommendation from Elizabeth to Morton). Atkinson then describes Cornelius de Vos exporting gold ore for assay. Arnold Bronckhorst was intended to be the agent for selling the gold to Scottish mint in Edinburgh but failed to secure a contract. He was, however, appointed to be the royal portrait painter.

Bronckhorst was officially appointed as royal painter in Scotland in 1581, a few years after the goldmining events Atkinson described. However, portraits made during the years of Morton's regency have been attributed to him. Several of the individuals named by Atkinson appear in the record. Abraham Peterson, the partner and successor of Cornelius de Vos, was a Dutch or Flemish metal worker or artist, as well as a mining entrepreneur, who worked in the Scottish mint and designed coins for Regent Morton, including placks and bawbees in April 1576. James Reid, who Atkinson identified as a partner of Cornelius de Vos, stood security with James Skathowie of the Canongate for the £500 loan from Regent Morton in 1575. Cornelius never repaid this loan, and after Morton was executed in 1581, Reid and Skathowie's heirs were liable to repay the money to the Earl of Lennox.
