= George Nedham (miner) =

English entrepreneur

George Nedham or Needham (died 1584) was an English entrepreneur and prospector associated with copper mining at Keswick in Cumbria.

== Family background ==
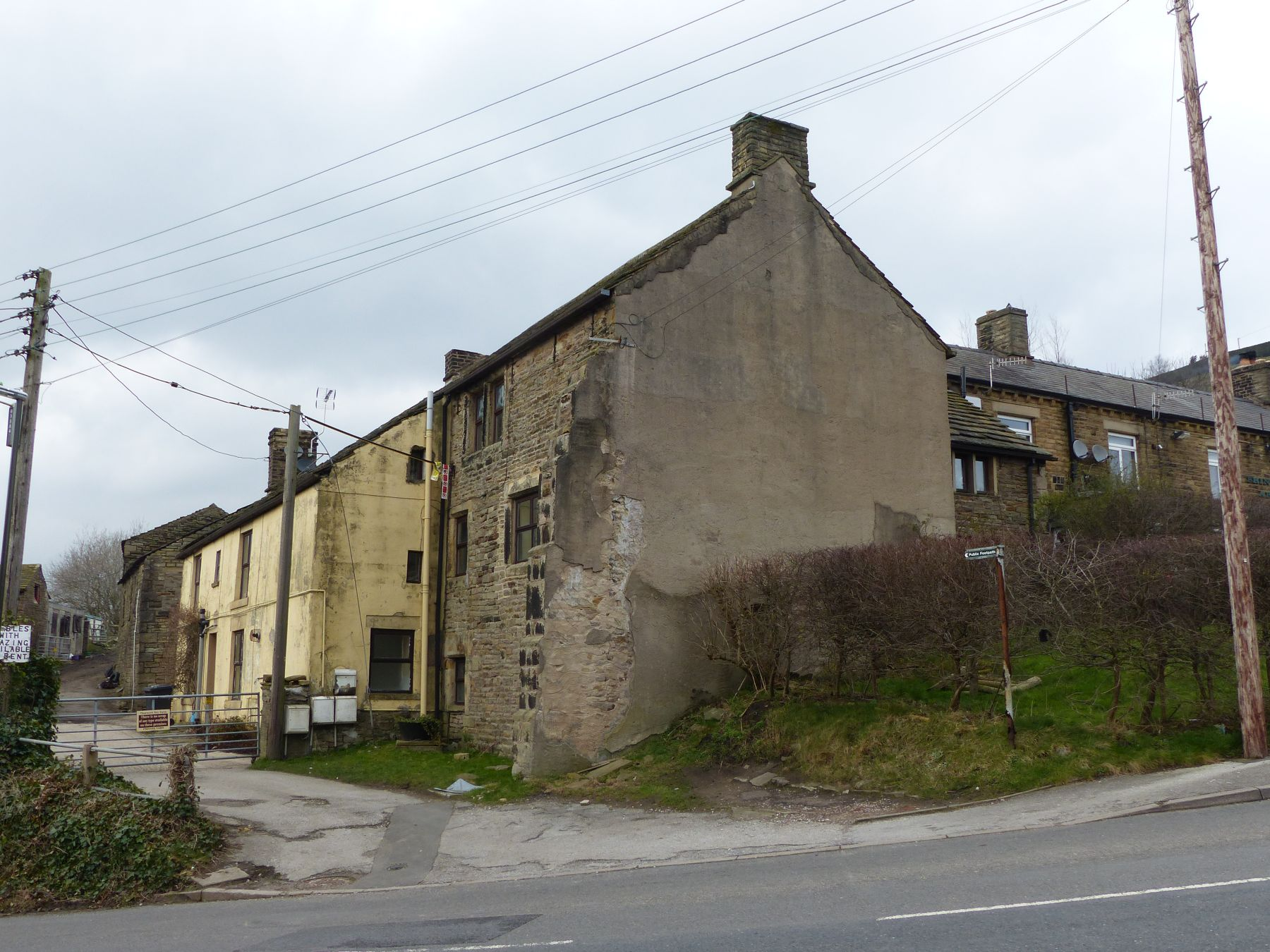
Thornsett Hall, now Thornsett Hey Farm, was the 16th-century home of the Nedham family

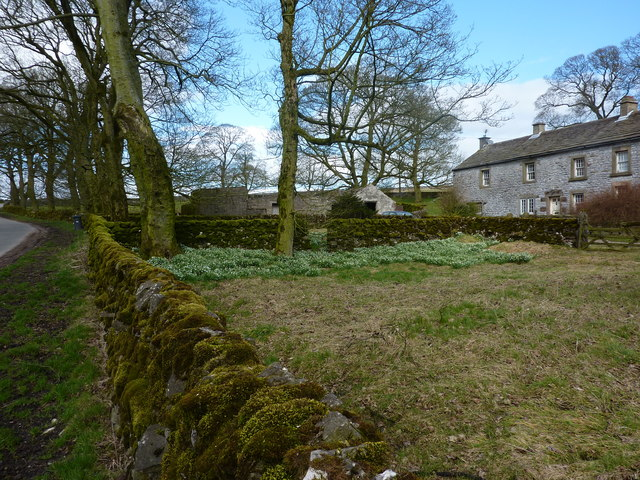
Needham Grange, Hartington Middle Quarter

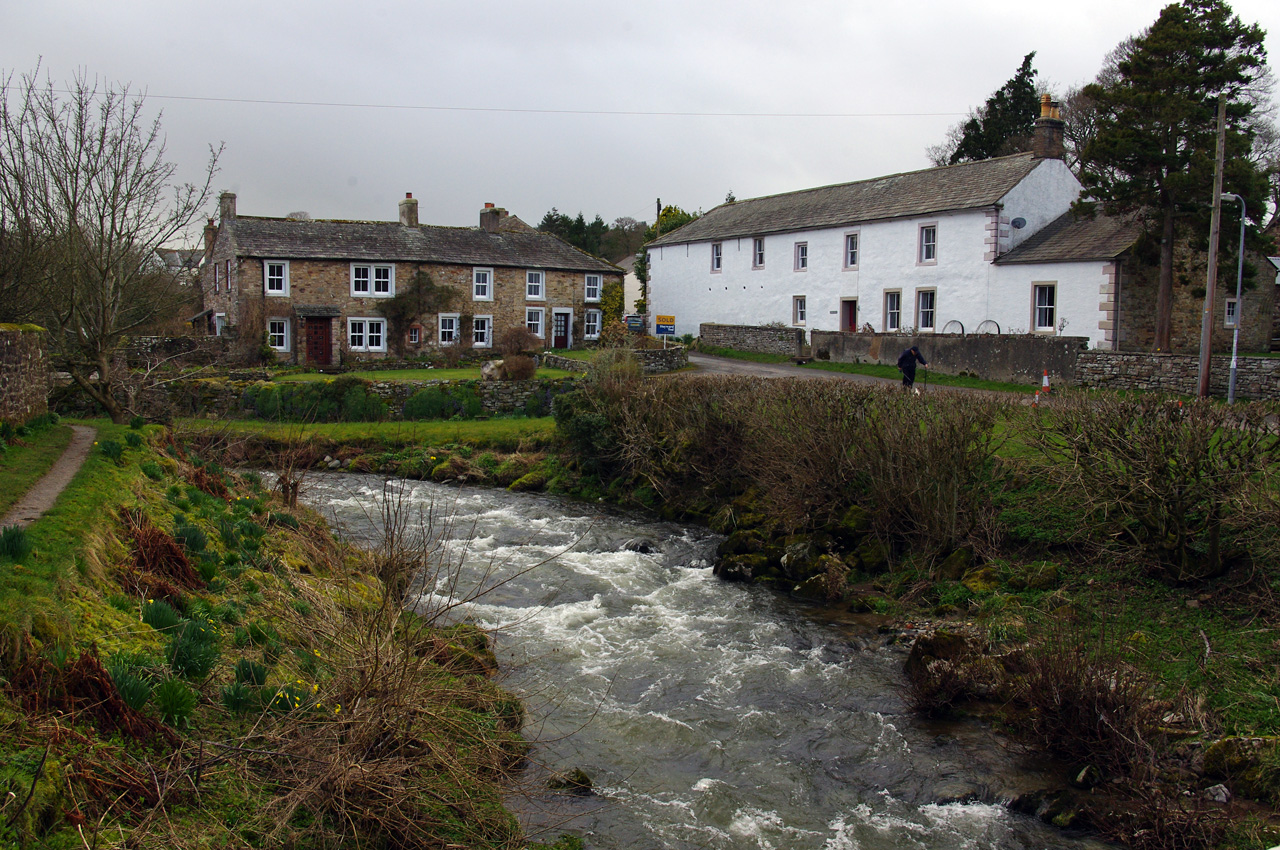
Copper mining in 16th-century Cumbria was centered around Caldbeck

Nedham's family was from Snitterton, Thornsett, and Darley Dale in Derbyshire. His father was Otwell Nedham and his mother Elizabeth, a daughter of Nicholas Cadman of Colly or Cowley, Derbyshire. He was probably a relation of James Nedeham (died 1544), a clerk of the works to Henry VIII. High Needham is a hamlet in the parish of Hartington Middle Quarter.

== Career ==
In 1564, George Nedham, then primarily involved in the cloth trade, was associated with the merchant Lionel Duckett in a political movement to cease trading with Spanish-governed Antwerp. He drafted "A Letter to the Earls of East Friesland" advocating trade at Emden. Nedham was fluent in several languages, and translated a treatise on mining written in German into Italian.

The Company of Mines Royal was founded in May 1568. Nedham was one of the lesser shareholders and joined with a German miner Daniel Hochstetter or Hechstetter to mine copper in Cumbria at Caldbeck and other sites. In September 1568, Nedham discussed building a wharf at Workington with Master Curwen, a landowner who had recently hosted Mary, Queen of Scots. Nedham went to Buxton, near his family home, and bought a large watchdog with a chain to guard the mining works.

Timber was used for construction and as a fuel for the smelting furnaces, some bought from Sir George and Catherine Radcliffe's woods at Borrowdale. A contract for the Borrowdale timber was signed by Thomas Thurland and Richard Dudley of Yanwath in 1569. In 1567, Nedham had written to William Cecil describing Catherine Radcliffe as "marvellous unreasonable" and "many times so froward that nothing could be had at her hand", claiming that she inflated the prices of useful timber in the district.

Coal was brought from the Workington district, but the plan for a wharf there was not realised. Nedham also had hopes for a deep-water haven at "Pillafowdre" or "Peel a Fouldre" (Piel Castle) on the Lancashire coast, and wrote to Cecil about this spot where Martin Schwartz had landed with Lambert Simnel. Nedham heard that the Yorkist pretender's arrival in June 1487 had been presaged by the catch of a large and mysterious fish. Just such a fish was caught when Nedham went to Piel to buy wine from a French ship. However, during the Elizabethan period, Lakeland lead and copper was carried to Newcastle-upon-Tyne on the east coast for export.

== Scottish gold ==
A Dutch prospector, Cornelius de Vos obtained a gold mining contract in Scotland with Regent Moray. George Nedham reported that Cornelius de Vos corresponded with Daniel Hochstetter and Johannes Loner at Keswick in October 1568, and sent a Dutch miner Rennier to them with requests, asking for assays of ores and skilled workmen to be sent to Scotland. The miners of Keswick were reluctant to get involved, and Nedham wrote to Lionel Duckett for advice and to know if Elizabeth I was supportive, considering the political instability in Scotland. Nedham asked Duckett to keep the business secret and ask the courtier John Tamworth to get the Queen's opinion. Tamworth had been a diplomat in Scotland, and had recently delivered money to Regent Moray from Elizabeth's privy purse.

== Hurtful humours ==
In two letters to Francis Walsingham, Nedham described the work of Joachim Gans at Keswick, who from 1581 smelted copper with Daniel Hochstetter. Gans carried out analysis of nine "hurtful humours" or "corrupt humours", materials in the ore which made producing pure copper difficult. Gans, according to Nedham, was able to mitigate the problem and the humours were "by art made friends" to increase the yield. The nine hurtful humours were identified as; sulphur, arsenic, antimony, vitriol, "calcator", alum, iron, black stone, and white stone. Nedham recommended that Joachim Gans join the new copper works at Neath. Gans, who was Jewish, was from Prague and later settled in Blackfriars, London.

== London Custom House quay ==
Nedham married Clare Jasper of Antwerp. He and his son Arthur Nedham were appointed farmers of the London Custom House quay in 1577. He seems to have petitioned Cecil and the Earl of Leicester for a position to "farm the new cranes and wharves" in London after his advocacy of Emden trade alienated Antwerp merchants. His wife's friends advised him against returning to Antwerp.

The Custom House was near the Tower of London and the Wool Quay, later known as Sugar Quay. By a statute of 1565, the wool trade was supposed only to use the Custom House quay, and Nedham successfully defended the privilege. Nedham improved the site on the tidal River Thames by removing accumulated sand so that lighters had longer hours of access to the quay, which, according to his petition, incurred the jealousy of other wharfingers.

== Francis Nedham's report ==
Around 1602, his son, Francis Nedham, wrote a report on copper mining at Keswick and Coniston with George Bowes. The manuscript is held by the Bodleian Library.
