= Richard Dudley (miner) =

English landowner

Richard Dudley of Yanwath (1518–1593) was an English landowner involved in copper and silver mines in the north of England from 1570 onwards.

== Career ==
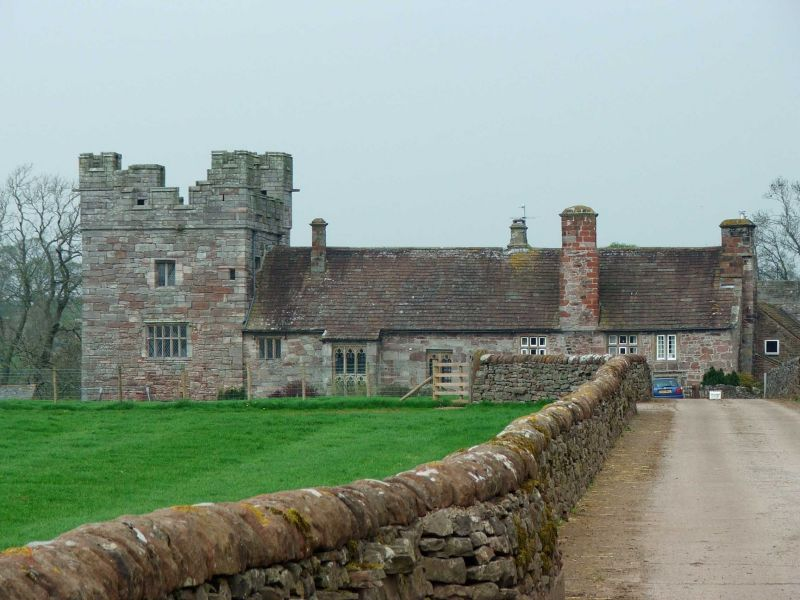
Yanwath Hall

He was the eldest son of Thomas Dudley of Yanwath in Westmorland and Sarah Thirkeld, heiress of Yanwath Hall. Thomas Dudley was a member of the Sutton-Dudley family, a younger son of Edmund Sutton and Maud or Matilda, daughter of Lord Clifford. The surname was originally "Sutton" and some branches of the family adopted the title Baron Dudley as a surname.

In the 1550s Richard Dudley had a legal dispute with the courtier Elizabeth Hutton, who was "mother of the maids" to Mary I of England. The case concerned the ownerership of a milldam on the River Eamont. She was a relation of one of his sisters-in-law.

In 1564, Dudlay was appointed as a governor of the newly founded free school in Penrith. He seems to have been the "Steward of Penrith" and in 1572 had demolished a part of Penrith Castle to build a prison in the town.

A justice of the peace, in January 1569 he arrested Thomas Bishop of Pocklington. Thomas Bishop was questioned at Yanwath for three days by the Bishop of Carlisle about the Duke of Norfolk and the Rising of the North.

Richard Dudley became the supervisor of the Keswick copper mines and smelting mills in 1570, as General Officer of the Queen's copper mines in Cumberland. He was the successor to the partnership of Thomas Thurland and Daniel Hechstetter. Dudley was appointed to this role following the recommendation of Lionel Ducket. His brother, John Dudley, was a shareholder and colleague of Ducket in the Society of Mines Royal.

Dudley bought equipment to weigh and marked refined ore, and built a storehouse. As treasurer for the mining district he received ore worked by Daniel Hechstetter's German miners. He had a stamp to mark ingots of refined copper. From 1581 some technological improvements were trialled by Joachim Gans from Prague, who used methods outlined by Lazarus Ercker.

In April 1585 he was invited to meet commissioners for building a bridge at Rothay. He declined, giving the excuse that he had a horse in a race at Langwathby on the day. Elizabeth I was displeased by the negligence and apathy shown by the commission on the bridge project.

== Family ==
Richard Dudley married Dorothy, daughter of Edmund Sandford of Askham, Cumbria. His younger brother John Dudley (died 1580) married Elizabeth Gardiner.

One of his nephews, also named Richard Dudley, was his heir. He was noted as a Catholic agent and Jesuit, and follower of Francis Dacre. According to Edward Stanhope, Richard Dudley was captured at Easter 1599 at the house of "Mrs Damport in Lancashire", probably meaning Bramhall or another home of Dorothy Davenport.

Richard Dudley, the Catholic heir, by this time had been disinherited by Richard Dudley, in favour of his younger brother John Dudley, who thus inherited Yanwath Hall. John Dudley was Member of Parliament for Carlisle in 1601. John Dudley and Richard Dudley were sons of Edmund Dudley, the copper miner's youngest brother, and his wife Katherine Hutton, the daughter of Cuthbert Hutton of Hutton John and his wife Elizabeth, the courtier Richard Dudley had a legal dispute with.
