= German mines at Caldbeck =

The German mines at Caldbeck were part of the operations of the Company of Mines Royal in Caldbeck, which introduced German miners from modern day Austria and Bavaria into the Lake District in 1563, though earlier works in the area are thought to have been begun in the 1300s. The importance of the operation lies in its historical significance as the first large-scale copper mining and smelting operation in the British Islands which was well-documented. New smelting techniques were introduced which were allowed the treatment of argentiferous copper sulphide ores and the more complex lead-copper-silver ores from Caldbeck.

Mining started at Caldbeck in June 1566 but was soon discontinued and was not resumed until 1568, when work continued under the supervision of the Hochstetter family until around 1630, and then was not resumed until around 1695. One of the German miners Cornelius de Vos left to set up gold mines in Scotland.

In July 1594 Emanuel Hochstetter sent Steffan Mur, who managed stamping mills to process the ore at Caldbeck and Newlands, to Nicholas Williamson at Sheffield, a steward of the Earl of Shrewsbury. Williamson had relations at Millbeck in Underskiddaw. Steffan Mur married a woman from Keswick, Isobel Wood, and their family is documented.

George Bowes and Francis Nedham (a son of George Nedham or Needham) reported on the state of the mines in 1602. Robert Bowes was killed in an accident in the mines in 1610.

The identity of the principal copper mines near Keswick and Coniston has long been known, but the locations of the Caldbeck mines have not. The lead-copper mines at Roughtengill have been considered to be the most probable candidates. However, recent fieldwork combined with records from archives has allowed identification of the principal mines.

The area falls within the Skiddaw Group SSSI, is a site of special scientific interest.
