= Hochstetter family =

Family

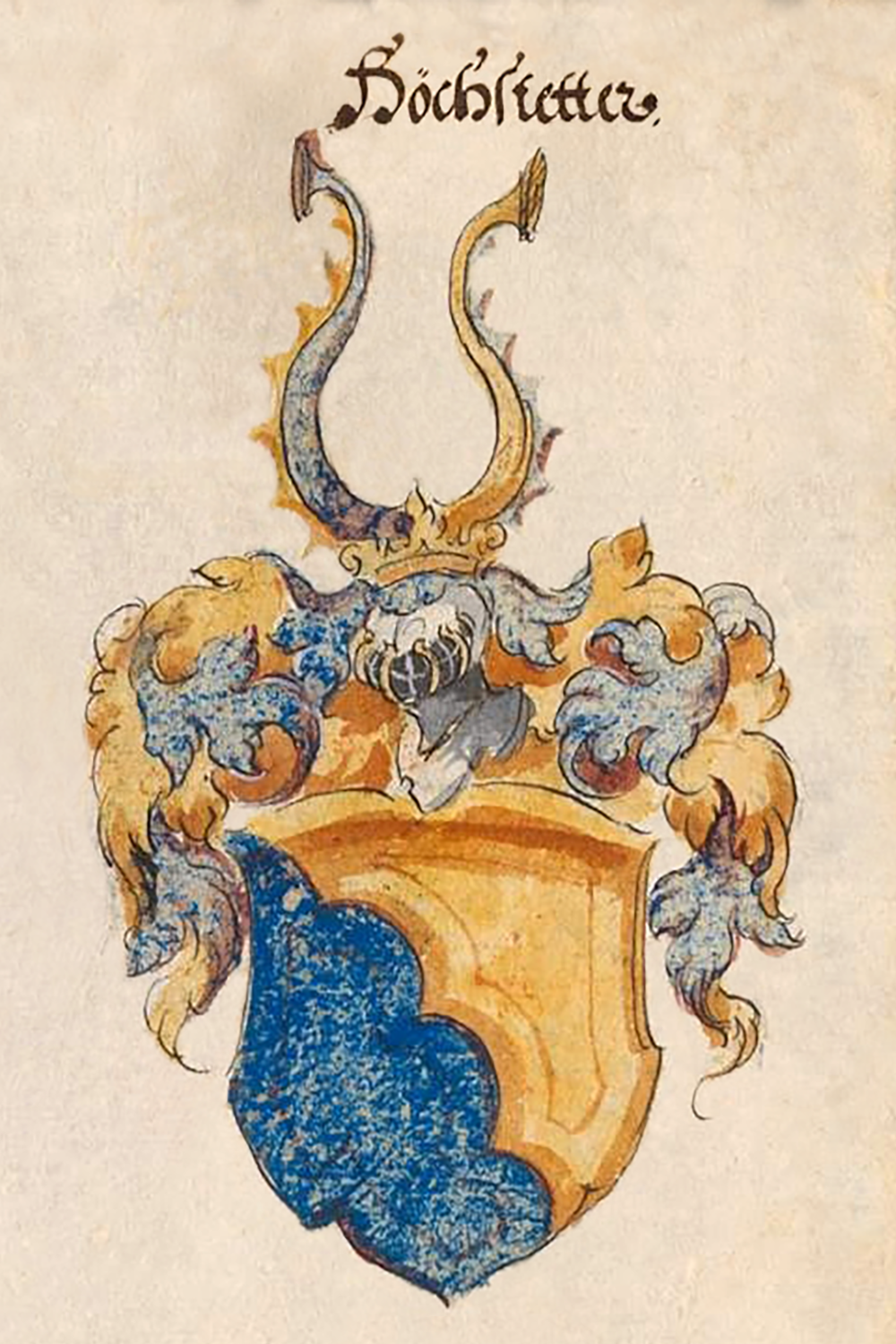
Coat of arms of Höchstetter family

The Höchstetter family (also rendered Hechstetter or Hochstetter), from Höchstädt in western Bavaria near the banks of the Danube, were members of the fifteenth and sixteenth-century mercantile patriciate of Augsburg.

For a time, these international mercantile bankers and venture capitalists – whose most notorious member was Ambrosius Höchstetter (1463–1534) – were on a par with the Fugger and the Welser houses. Like other Augsburg bankers, they provided loans to Emperor Maximilian I (reigned 1508–1519).

The accumulating wealth of Augsburg relied on control of metal ores – the gold, silver, and copper of Bohemia, Slovakia, Hungary, and the Tyrol – and their refining and marketing. The Hochstetter company drew upon investments as small as a few florins, but the total invested with him required Ambrosius Höchstetter to pay out up to a million florins a year in interest. He successfully cornered, for brief periods, local markets in ash timber, grain, and certain wines. Grain hoarding is never a popular practice, and Ambrosius was accused of adulterating the spices in which he traded. His son and son-in-law lost spectacular sums in gambling. Then, Ambrosius Höchstetter tried to engross the whole quicksilver stock in a cartel in 1529; this failed attempt to corner the market led to his bankruptcy (1529) for 800,000 gulden, for which he would die in prison. Rising prices bring out a hidden supply, and the size of the required investment had become too large for even the greatest merchant-banking house to monopolize, as the Fuggers discovered with their attempt on the copper market. Figures representing the enormous profits of the Hochstetter at their height became public after a certain Bartholomew Rhein invested 900 gulden in the Hochstetter company in 1511; by 1517, he claimed a profit of 33,000 gulden. The company was willing to settle at 26,000, and the resulting litigation caused the figures to become public. A commission of the Reichstag held at Nuremberg in 1522–1523 found, in part, that

"These rich Companies, even one of them, do in the year compass much more undoing to the Commonweal than all other robbers and thieves in that they and their servants give public display of luxuriousness, pomp and prodigal wealth, of which there is no small proof in that Bartholomew Rhein did win, in so short a time and with so little stock of trade, such notable riches in the Hochstetter Company — as hath openly appeared in the justifying before the City Court at Augsburg and at the Reichstag but lately held at Worms."

The house of Höchstetter itself did not go under. In 1526, Sir Richard Gresham, when detained at Neuport, sent a letter with Joachim Höchstetter to Cardinal Wolsey, characterising Höchstetter as one of the richest and most influential merchants of Germany and a great exporter of wheat to London.

The Höchstetter were ennobled by Imperial patent, 1518, as Höchstetter von Burgwalden.

Richard Ehrenberg describes the sixteenth-century economic activities in which the Hochstetter participated in a classic work, Das Zeitalter der Fugger: Geldkapital und Kreditverkehr im 16. Jahrhundert ("The Age of the Fuggers: Capital and the Credit Market in the Sixteenth Century") Jena, 1896.

== Copper in England ==
The Höchstetter were involved in an Elizabethan copper-mining venture with the Society of Mines Royal. In 1564 Elizabeth I granted Daniel Höchstetter and his English partner Thomas Thurland a patent to mine and refine gold, copper, silver, and mercury (quicksilver), in England and Wales. They were allowed 24 partners or investors. They worked copper mines in the Lake District. This arrangement was dissolved in 1577.
