= Hochstetter =

Höchstetter (also as Hochstätter or Hochstetter) is a German surname. Notable persons with the surname include:

- Astrid Hochstetter (born 1979), German figure skater
- Christian Hochstätter (born 1963), German professional footballer
- Ferdinand Hochstetter (1861–1954), Austrian anatomist
- Ferdinand von Hochstetter (1829–1884), Austrian geologist

== See also ==
- Hochstetter family
