= Thomas Thomson (apothecary) =

Thomas Thomson (died 1572) was a Scottish apothecary in Edinburgh who served the court of Mary, Queen of Scots.

== Career ==
Thomson was active in the 1540s and supplied medicines to Regent Arran, his daughter Barbara, Lady Gordon, and Cardinal Beaton. He was the apothecary to Regent Arran, who paid him an annual fee.

The Italian physician Girolamo Cardano, who came to Scotland in 1552, described a pearl head dress worn by Thomson's daughter, comprising 73 Scottish pearls, "I saw on a girl's head, the daughter of Thomas Thomson in Edinburgh, about seventy three Scottish pearls, of equal and remarkable size".

When Patrick Ruthven, 3rd Lord Ruthven was unwell for three months in 1565 he was treated by the queen's French doctor, the physician David Preston, and Thomas Thomson.

Thomas Thomson died in 1572. At his death the "drugs, unguents, plasters, spices, and other medicaments" in his shop and cellar were worth £300 Scots. Robert Henryson complained in 1575 that he was still owed money, and the price of a chest of gray sugar and a barrel of olive oil from Thomson's estate.

== Marriage and family ==
Thomas Thomson married Margaret Barton, a granddaughter of the treasurer Robert Barton. In 1552 they bought the lands of East and West Duddingston from her brother Robert Barton. In January 1572 Thomson granted the lands of Duddingston to his son Alexander.

Their children included:

- Alexander Thomson of Duddingston, advocate, (died 1603), who married Margaret Preston in 1594, a daughter of Samuel Preston of Craigmillar, and widow of Walter Cant.
- Alexander Thomson, apothecary. In 1590 he had a shop or booth in a tenement at the top of Niddry's Wynd in Edinburgh.
- Adam Thomson, apothecary
- Janet Thomson, who married Adam Dickson, an apothecary who trained with her father
- Patrick Thomson
