= George Bowes (prospector) =

English prospector

George Bowes (died 1606) was an English prospector. He mined for gold in Scotland.

== Family background ==
George was a son of Sir George Bowes of Streatlam and Dorothy Mallory. He married Magdalen Bray, daughter of Sir Edward Bray.

== Coal and copper ==
In 1595 he planned a coal mine on his own estate of Beddick Waterville. In 1602 he was allowed to mine for copper in the Knowsley estate belonging to the Earl of Derby. At Caldbeck near Keswick, in 1602, Bowes and Francis Nedham (a son of George Nedham or Needham) reported on old copper workings and lead which contained a proportion of silver.

== Surveying the gold fields in 1603 ==
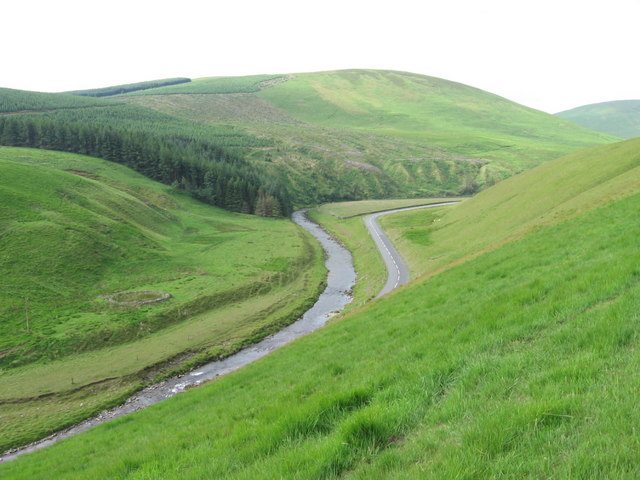
Crawick water

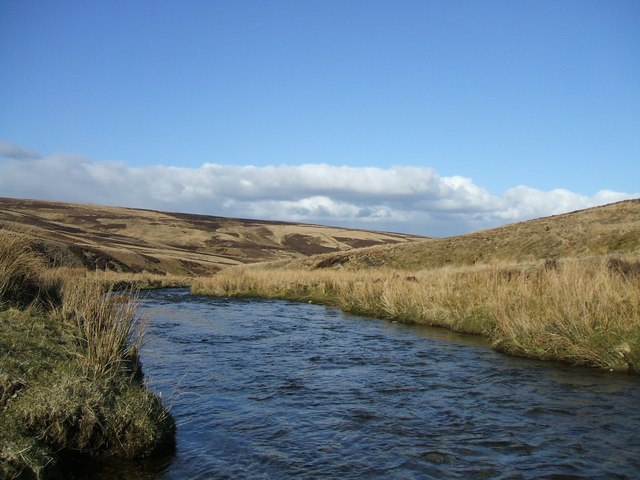
Elvan water

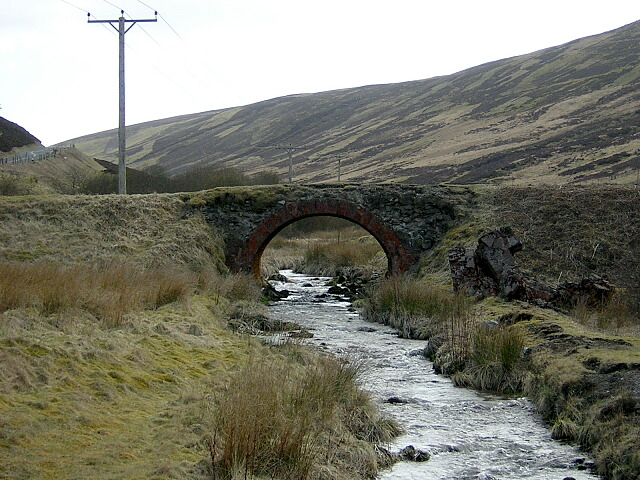
Glengonnar water

Bowes became interested in mining for gold in Scotland, probably hearing of the work of George Douglas of Parkhead and of Cornelius de Vos who had strong links with the mines in Keswick. He wrote in 1603 that James VI had invited him to come to Scotland twice before the Union of the Crowns, by means of his uncle, the ambassador Robert Bowes.

He wrote a paper describing his reasons for seeking gold on Crawford Moor. He mentioned he had worked in Cornwall, Devon, Somerset, and at Keswick. Napier of Merchiston had shown him samples of gold ore. At the request of the Privy Council, Godolphin went to Carlisle to meet Bowes and Bevis Bulmer in November 1603.

Bowes wrote to Earl of Suffolk while he was at Leadhills on 10 December 1603, describing the geology, and mentioned an earlier venture when he tried to form a partnership with Thomas Foulis, who had exclusive rights from James VI, but was discouraged by Queen Elizabeth. In another letter he described a story from an old miner's father of the discovery of a vein of gold in the time of James IV or Regent Albany, ninety years earlier, which they backfilled and hid. Bowes was understandably cautious about these stories, which came from his rival Bevis Bulmer's employees, and men who would be grateful for work in new mining ventures.

Bowes, Napier of Merchiston, Bevis Bulmer and John Brode sent a joint letter from Edinburgh on 29 December 1603 to the Privy Council. They had surveyed the gold mining region according to the king's orders given at Wilton in November. Gold had previously been found by Bulmer in the head of a long stream that descended to the Elvan water, and on Steroc brae that descends to Wanlock water, in the Glengonnar water, and the Crawick water that flows into the Nith. Although much gold had been found, no vein bearing gold had been discovered, despite finds of gold mixed with spar. The Scottish miners had not searched for veins of ore until Bulmer and Thomas Foulis had recently dug for copper. Bulmer and his workers insisted they had not found a vein. The places were remote with no dwelling places, especially for works managers, and timber for houses and lodgings would have to be brought from Leith.

== Mining in 1604 ==
He received a grant of £100 in February 1604 from the exchequer to work a mine in Scotland. Bevis Bulmer had also been given £200 in January to work gold in the same district. His letters to Robert Cecil, now Lord Essendon, complain that Thomas Foulis had disrupted his workings by detaining his English timber man. He hoped that Lord Balmerino, Secretary for Scotland would help him. Bowes stayed at Codrus Cottage, above Wanlock Water.

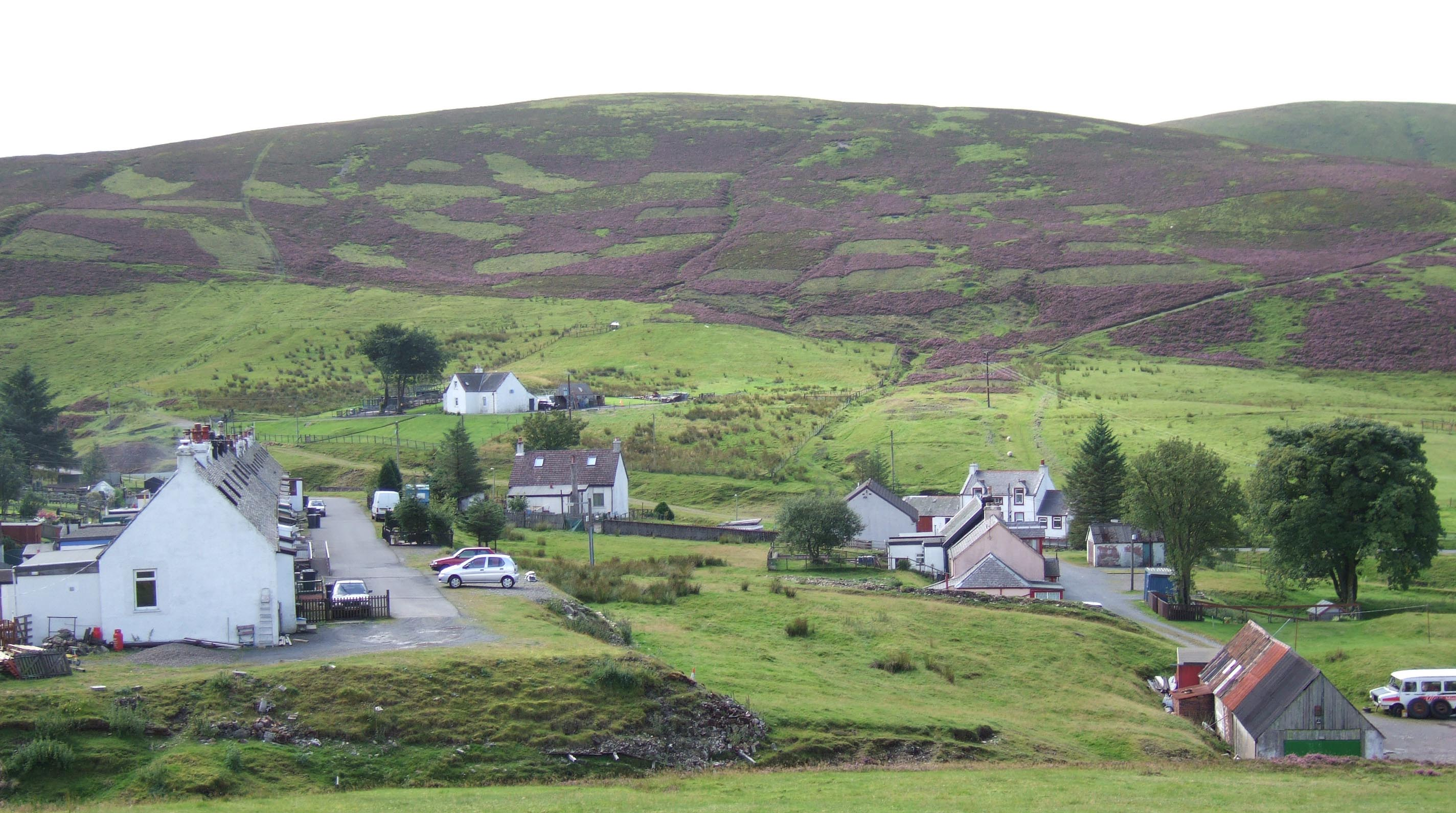
The village of Wanlockhead

He wrote in March 1604 of a difficult journey in winter to the works at Wanlock Water. The Venetian ambassador Nicolò Molin reported on his progress in February 1605. He heard that Bowes had told Queen Elizabeth about gold mines in Scotland, but she had arrested him. Bowes had found support from King James and produced 25 ounces of gold but with large costs, and was losing supporters.

On 10 June 1605 he wrote to the Robert Cecil, now Earl of Salisbury, from Biddick Waterville about the progress of his search for gold in Scotland near Wanlockhead. He had requested a tent big enough to feed 80 workmen. In 1604 he had found a potential seam of spar and yellowish clay, obtaining a grant of £200 to further the work, and in November began to mine there and drain the pit. He built houses on the lands of Sir Thomas Kirkpatrick of Closeburn. He was not confident of finding gold in any quantity, and on 28 May rode to Edinburgh to report his findings to Alexander Seton, Lord Chancellor and the Lord President, Lord Balmerino. Balmerino inspected his work and the works belonging to Bevis Bulmer. Bowes abandoned his efforts in June 1605 due to poor health, and Bevis Bulmer took over his concessions. Bowes died soon after.

In July 1606 his widow, Magdalen Bowes, petitioned the Earl of Salisbury for money and help, mentioning that George Bowes had held the offices of Constable of Raby Castle and Stewardship of the lands of Charles, Earl of Westmorland. During his absence in Scotland the offices were held by William Davenport and Edward Marley who transferred to John Richardson. Bowes had to pay Richardson to get them back. Bowes had mined copper at Keswick and Knowsley in Queen Elizabeth's time, and the efforts had given him bruises and distempers which shortened his life. The Earl of Dorset had given the two offices to their eldest son, also called George Bowes, but others had made difficulties.

Stephen Atkinson, wrote that "Mr Bowes" had found a vein of gold on Wanlock Water, which Bevis Bulmer later exploited. Atkinson states this was in the reign of Queen Elizabeth. Previously gold mines had been opened by Cornelius de Vos and George Douglas of Parkhead. The British Library has a fragmentary description of gold mining in Scotland which may have been written by George Bowes as a petition for funding in 1603.

George's elder brother Robert Bowes was killed in an accident at a copper mine in Keswick in 1610.

== Family ==
The children of George Bowes and Magdalen Bray included:

- George Bowes, baptised 6 May 1596.
- Robert Bowes, baptised 29 September 1597, married Joan Hutton.
- Bray Bowes, baptised 2 January 1603.
- Ralph Bowes
- Toby Bowes of the Waterside.
- William Bowes, baptised 12 August 1599.
- Dorothy Bowes, baptised 7 February 1604.
- Magdalen Bowes, baptised 4 February 1593.
