= Wanlockhead =

Village in Dumfries and Galloway, Scotland

Coordinates: 55.397°N 3.777°W

Wanlockhead: Scottish Gaelic: Ceann Cumhang; Scots: Wanlockheid
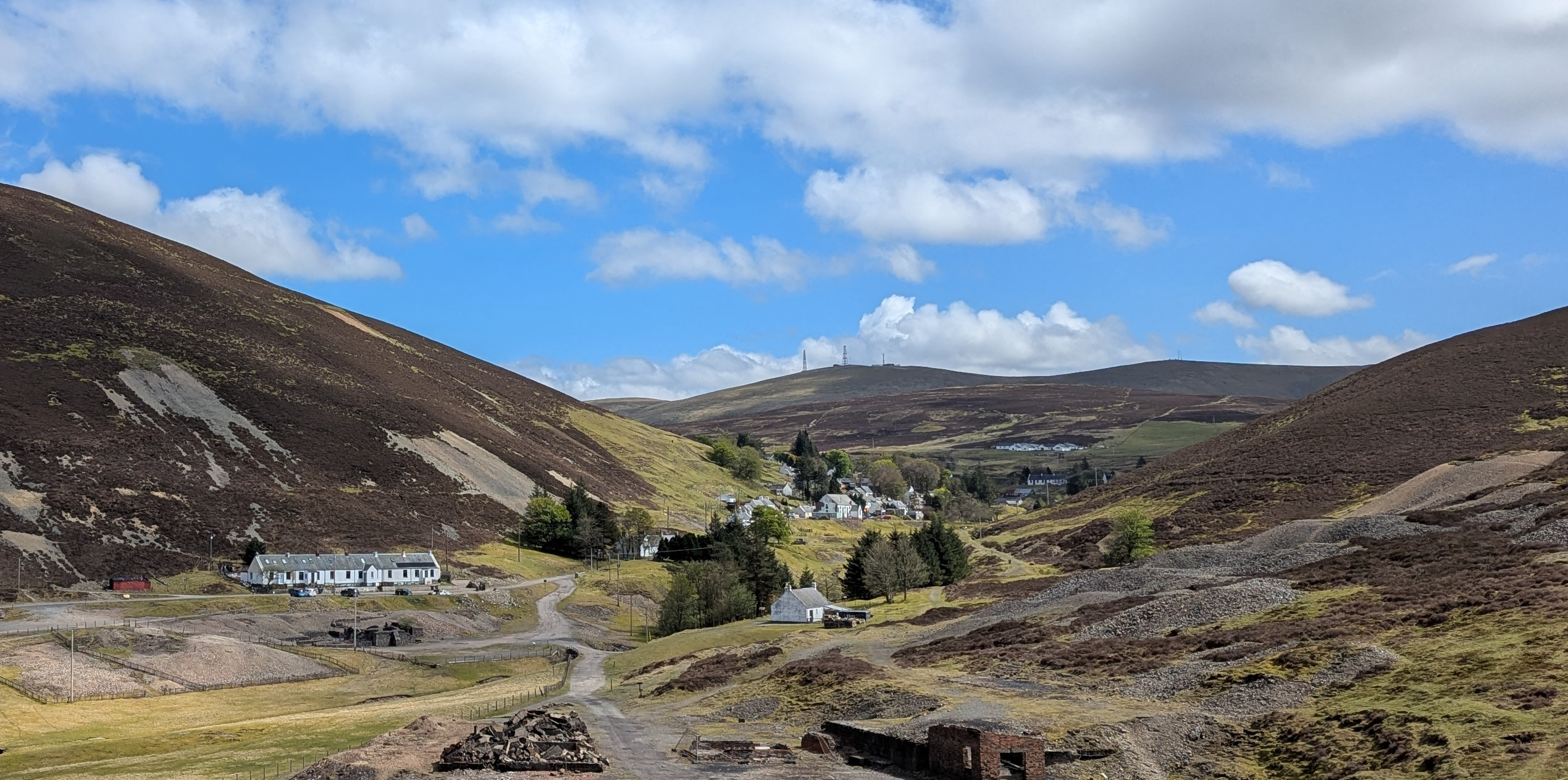
- Wanlockhead village from the north

- Location within Dumfries and Galloway
- OS grid reference: NS871129
- Council area: Dumfries and Galloway
- Lieutenancy area: Dumfries
- Country: Scotland
- Sovereign state: United Kingdom
- Post town: BIGGAR
- Postcode district: ML12
- Police: Scotland
- Fire: Scottish
- Ambulance: Scottish
- UK Parliament: Dumfriesshire, Clydesdale and Tweeddale
- Scottish Parliament: Dumfriesshire

Wanlockhead is a village in Dumfries and Galloway, Scotland, nestling in the Lowther Hills and 1 mile (2 kilometres) south of Leadhills at the head of the Mennock Pass, which forms part of the Southern Uplands. It is Scotland's highest village, the village centre being at an elevation of around 405 m (1,329 ft) above sea level. Some sources, including VisitScotland, cite an altitude of 467 metres (1,532 ft) – which would make it higher than Flash, Staffordshire, and thus the highest village in the United Kingdom – but the highest house in Wanlockhead has been measured at 444 metres (1,457 ft).

The village can be accessed via the B797, which connects it to the A76 near Sanquhar and the A74(M) motorway at Abington.

== History ==
Wanlockhead takes its name from the Wanlock Water, a stream which rises in the remote hollow which forms the setting of the village. The village owes its existence to the lead and other mineral deposits found in the surrounding hills. These deposits were first exploited by the Romans, and from the 13th century they began to be worked again in the summer. The village was founded permanently in 1680 when the Duke of Buccleuch built a lead smelting plant and workers' cottages.

Lead, zinc, copper and silver were mined nearby, as well as some of the world's purest gold at 22.8 carats, which was used to make the Scottish Crown. Early gold miners included Cornelius de Vos, George Bowes, and Bevis Bulmer. Wanlockhead became known as "God's treasure house" from the richness of its mineral resources.

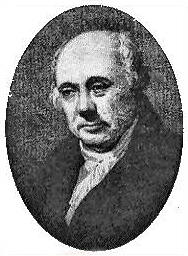
William Symington, Engineer.

Despite a branch railway (see Leadhills & Wanlockhead Railway), also the highest in Scotland, which served the village from 1901 to 1939, lead mining declined in the 20th century and finished in the 1950s. From 1850 the Glasgow and South Western Railway had provided sidings at Mennock Lye Goods Depot for the use of the Wanlockhead and Leadhills mines.

The village had a curling club which was formed in 1777 and there were also quoits, bowling clubs, a drama group and a silver band which had instruments purchased for them by the Duke of Buccleuch.

William Symington was from Leadhills, but lived and worked in Wanlockhead. His fame lies in the fact that he designed the engine used to power the world's first steamboat. This boat was successfully tested on Dalswinton Loch near Ellisland on 14 October 1788. Dalswinton was the home of Robert Burns's landlord, Patrick Miller.

=== Robert Burns ===
Robert Burns and an associate, Thomas Sloan, visited Wanlockhead in the winter of 1789–90. The weather was very icy and they decided to have their horses' shoes 'frosted', that is sharpened to increase the grip. They had to wait their turn and took shelter at Ramage's Inn, where Burns wrote a poem entitled Pegasus at Wanlockhead. Pegasus was the name of Burns' horse.

Burns also visited Wanlockhead in January 1792 to explore the lead mines. He was accompanied by Maria Riddell, the sister of Robert Riddell of Friar's Carse. They breakfasted at Sanquhar and then took a post chaise to the mines. They went a considerable distance into the mines, braving the dark, wet and cramped conditions at first; however they had to turn back as Burns found the poor air very distressing. Burns did not record this visit, but Maria included the details in a letter.

== Geography ==
=== Climate ===
Wanlockhead has a moist oceanic climate (Cfb, according to the Köppen climate classification), with cool to chilly weather throughout the year, bordering on a subpolar oceanic climate (Cfc, according Köppen). This town has cool summers and chilly winters, with snowfalls. It is one of the coldest inhabited places in the United Kingdom.

Climate data for Wanlockhead
Month	Jan	Feb	Mar	Apr	May	Jun	Jul	Aug	Sep	Oct	Nov	Dec	Year
Mean daily maximum °C (°F)	3.5 (38.3)	3.8 (38.8)	6.1 (43.0)	9.0 (48.2)	12.5 (54.5)	15.6 (60.1)	16.7 (62.1)	16.4 (61.5)	13.6 (56.5)	10.6 (51.1)	6.4 (43.5)	4.3 (39.7)	9.9 (49.8)
Daily mean °C (°F)	0.8 (33.4)	0.8 (33.4)	2.8 (37.0)	5.0 (41.0)	8.2 (46.8)	11.3 (52.3)	12.5 (54.5)	12.3 (54.1)	10.0 (50.0)	7.3 (45.1)	3.4 (38.1)	1.6 (34.9)	6.3 (43.4)
Mean daily minimum °C (°F)	−1.9 (28.6)	−2.1 (28.2)	−0.4 (31.3)	1.0 (33.8)	3.9 (39.0)	7.0 (44.6)	8.4 (47.1)	8.3 (46.9)	6.4 (43.5)	4.0 (39.2)	0.4 (32.7)	−1.0 (30.2)	2.8 (37.1)
Average precipitation mm (inches)	154 (6.1)	107 (4.2)	121 (4.8)	82 (3.2)	83 (3.3)	84 (3.3)	89 (3.5)	109 (4.3)	127 (5.0)	145 (5.7)	146 (5.7)	163 (6.4)	1,410 (55.5)
Source: Climate-data.org

== Facilities ==
The village now features a lead mining museum and industrial equipment from the 18th century and is a popular tourist destination.

Wanlockhead is on the Southern Upland Way, a walking trail that traditionally starts at Portpatrick on the west coast, in Dumfries & Galloway, and finishes some 212 miles (341 km) away at Cockburnspath on the east coast, in the Scottish Borders.

The village is also the home of the highest pub in Scotland, the Wanlockhead Inn, which opened in 2003; an earlier pub on a track rising from the other side of the main road through the village was considerably higher, but closed in the late 1990s.

The village is the setting for the BBC television drama series Hope Springs.

=== Wanlockhead library ===
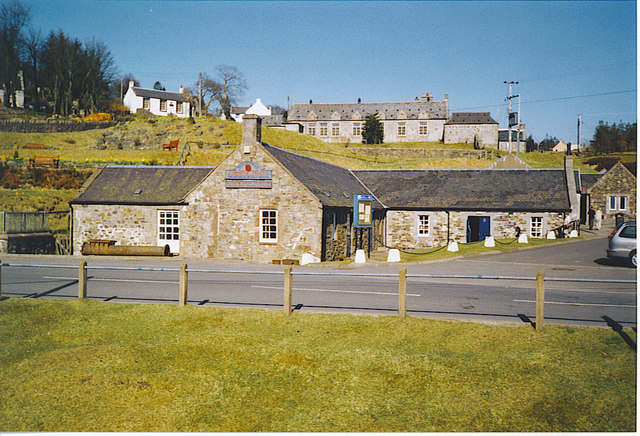
The old Wanlockhead Miners' Library, now the Museum of Lead Mining, Wanlockhead.

Wanlockhead Miners' Library is the second-oldest subscription library in Great Britain and was established on 1 November 1756 with 32 male members who mainly funded the purchase of the books, etc.; a contribution was also made by mining companies who were keen to encourage such acts of 'self-improvement' amongst the miners. The Duke of Buccleuch, as the land owner, was a major patron of the library. The library was essential in facilitating a level of educational achievement that allowed some miners and their children to escape the toil of mine work.

The school housed the library at first, but as the number of books increased, it became necessary in 1787 to move the library to a cottage given for this express purpose by the mine overseers. However the cottage was a small one and it was found to be necessary to construct a larger building. The number of books purchased through subscription eventually rose to over 2,000 and in 1851 a new library was built and survives to this day. In 1974 the Wanlockhead Museum Trust took over the running of the library.

The Miners' Library became a Recognised Collection of National Significance in October 2007.

=== Meadowfoot cemetery ===
This lies approximately 1 mile (2 kilometres) from the village and dates from 1751. Before Wanlockhead had its own graveyard, coffins had to be transported along a typical corpse road the 8 miles (13 km) to the nearest graveyard, which was at Sanquhar. William Philip Minder who died on 2 April 1751 aged just 10 months was the first burial at the newly opened burial site.

== Beam engine ==
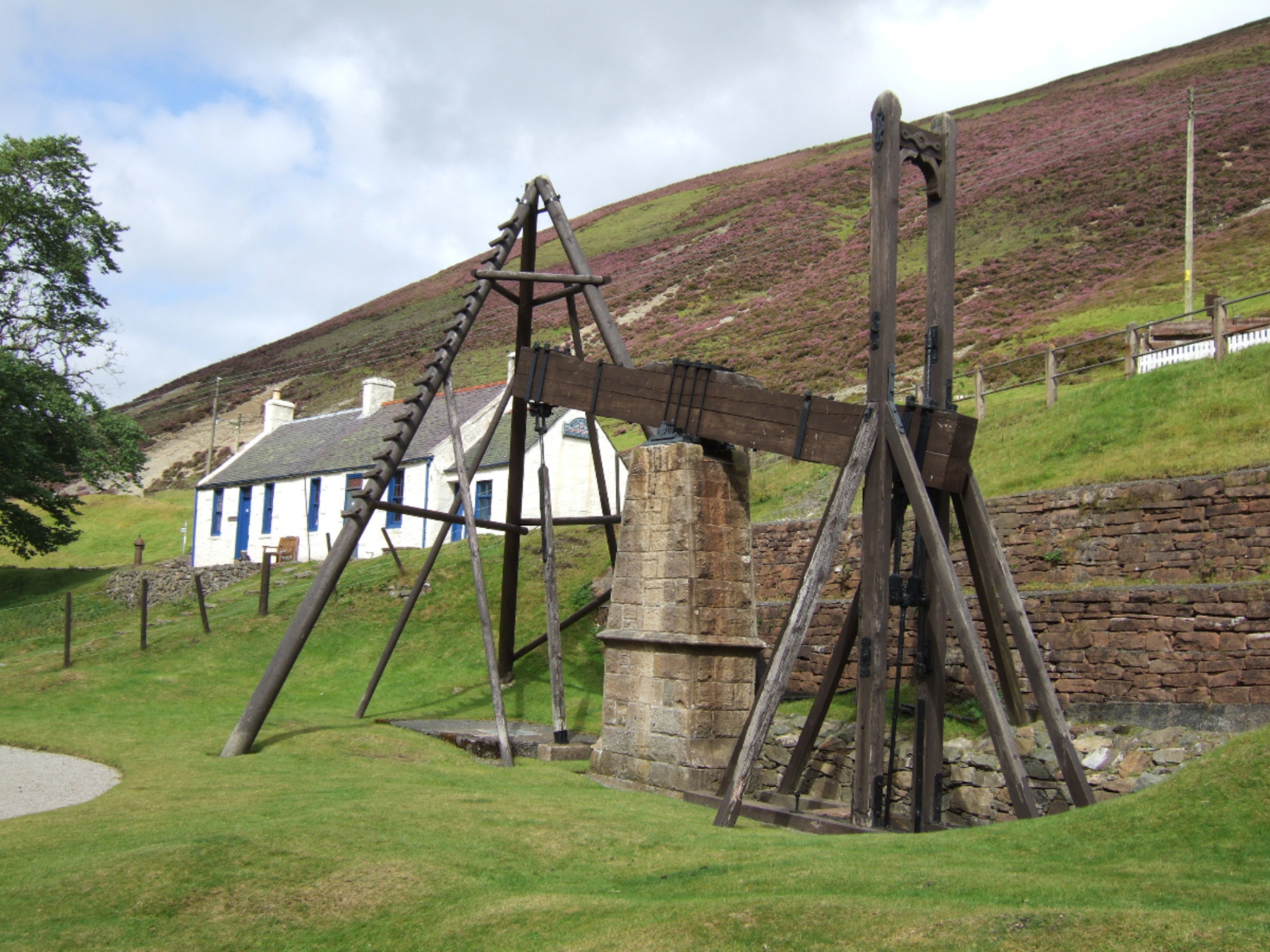
Hydraulic pumping engine at Wanlockhead

The beam engine and water bucket pumps were introduced into Wanlockhead in 1745. The history on the beam engine is not certain, but accounts of similar engines have been recorded on a coal mine at Canonbie, Dumfriesshire, in the 1790s. The Wanlockhead Beam Engine was built, supposedly, in the middle of the 19th century and is the only lasting example of a water bucket pumping engine to be seen on a mine in the UK today.

The beam engine allowed miners to continue working in the Straitsteps mine, and assuming that there were two strokes of the beam per minute, this engine would have been able to lift around 7,280 litres per hour (1,600 imp gal/h) and requiring little attention it would have been left to do this twenty-four hours a day. The wooden bucket was fed from a cistern above and once the weight of water was greater than the water above the pump piston the beam was lifted, carrying water from up to 28 metres (92 ft) below ground into a wood lined culvert which carried it off to the nearby burn. Periodically the weight of the piston was adjusted so that it remained heavier than the empty bucket, ensuring that the beam fell to start the cycle again.

The Secretary of State for Scotland in 1972 took on the guardianship of the beam engine, making it Scotland's third Industrial Monument. Historic Scotland owns and maintains the engine. A working model of the engine is located in the Museum of Scottish Lead Mining.

== Lowther Hills Ski Centre ==
Wanlockhead is one of the birthplaces of Scottish winter sports. Curling in Wanlockhead can be traced back to 1777, when the Wanlockhead Curling Society –one of Scotland's first Curling societies- was created. Scotland's first boys' Curling club was established in Wanlockhead in 1883. The sport remained popular in the area until the 1930s, when the mines closed.

Since the 1920s skiing in the Wanlockhead area has been organised intermittently by a succession of local residents as well as several non-for-profit sports clubs. Lowther Hill, above the village, is home to the only ski area in the south of Scotland, and Scotland's only community-owned ski centre. Operated by Lowther Hills Ski Club, the ski centre runs three ski lifts above the villages of Leadhills and Wanlockhead for beginners and intermediate skiers.

== See also ==
- List of places in Dumfries and Galloway
- Enterkinfoot and the Enterkin Pass
- Mennock
- Allenheads – an upland lead mining village in Northumberland that is 404 m (1,325 ft) above sea-level

== Sources ==
- Dougall, Charles S. (1911). The Burns Country. London: A & C Black.
- Keggans, Sandie (2004). Transporting the Lead. Wanlockhead Museum Trust. ISBN 978-0-9530645-3-3.
- Wanlockhead Museum Trust (2004). Lochnell Mine & The Wanlockhead Beam Engine. Wanlockhead Museum Trust. ISBN 978-0-9530645-6-4.
- Mackay, James A. (1988). Burns-lore of Dumfries and Galloway. Ayr: Alloway Publishing. ISBN 978-0-907526-36-0.
- Muir, Richard (2008). Woods, Hedgerows and Leafy Lanes. Stroud: Tempus. ISBN 978-0-7524-4615-8.
