= Joachim Gans =

Bohemian miner

Joachim Gans (other spellings: Jeochim, Jochim, Gaunz, Ganse, Gaunse; fl. 1581 – 1589) was a Bohemian mining expert, renowned for being the first Jew in North America.

== Biography ==
=== Early life ===
Gans was born in Prague, Kingdom of Bohemia to Ashkenazi Jewish parents, and likely related to David Gans, who settled there in 1564.

=== England ===
He is first mentioned in his professional capacity at Keswick, Cumberland, in 1581. He worked at the Newlands mine managed by Richard Dudley and implemented some technologies outlined by Lazarus Ercker.

Gans introduced a new process for the "making of Copper, vitriall, and Coppris, and smeltinge of Copper and leade ures". Gans figured in the English state papers of the reign of Elizabeth I which include a full description of his operations written by a colleague George Nedham. Gans's most dramatic scientific discovery was to reduce the time to purify a batch of copper ore from sixteen weeks to just four days. Additionally, Gans was able to use the impurities removed from the copper ore in textile mordants.

=== Colonization of America ===
Gans became the first Bohemian and the first recorded Jew in colonial America when, in 1585, Sir Walter Raleigh recruited him for an expedition to found a permanent settlement in the Virginia territory of the New World.

Sir Ralph Lane, Governor of Raleigh's expedition, led the Roanoke Colony on Roanoke Island off the coast of modern North Carolina in 1585. Among the ruins at the Roanoke site, archaeologists have discovered lumps of smelted copper and a goldsmith's crucible attributed to Gans's work at the colony. Because the royal mining company failed to resupply colonists who were also becoming increasingly fearful of conflicts with the Native Americans, they accepted an offer from Sir Francis Drake in June 1586 to sail them to England. Each of the colonists, including Gans, left North America.

=== Later life and trial for blasphemy ===
Gans moved to the city of Bristol where he gave Hebrew lessons to English gentlemen who wanted to read the Bible in its original tongue. In 1589, Bishop of Chichester Richard Curteys visited Gans who in speaking "in the Hebrue tonge", proclaimed himself a Jew. Bishop Curteys asked Gans, "Do you deny Jesus Christ to be the Son of God?" Gans replied, "What needeth the almighty God to have a son? Is he not almighty?" Gans was brought before the mayor and aldermen of Bristol for blasphemy. Rather than embarrass an associate of the Royal Mining Company, Bristol's town fathers referred his case to the Queen's Privy Council, which included major investors of the Royal Mining Company. Gans was transported back to London to face their judgment.

Francis Walsingham, who was then joint principal secretary and other members of the council also knew him. The council appears to have taken no hostile action, however, although the trial's outcome and all subsequent history of Gans is unknown, as no information is available.

=== Posterity ===
His discoveries along with the general body of his scientific work led to a degree of fame. Some historians have suggested that Gans was the model for the Jewish scientist Joabin in Sir Francis Bacon's utopian novel, New Atlantis, although others have suggested Joabin is named after Joab, the commander of King David's army and David's co-conspirator in Uriah the Hittite's death.
