= Bevis Bulmer =

English mining engineer (1536–1615)

Sir Bevis Bulmer (1536–1615) was an English mining engineer during the reigns of Elizabeth I and James I. He has been called "one of the great speculators of that era". Many of the events in his career were recorded by Stephen Atkinson in The Discoveries and Historie of the Gold Mynes in Scotland, compiled in part from a lost manuscript by Bulmer entitled Bulmer's Skill.

== Family ==
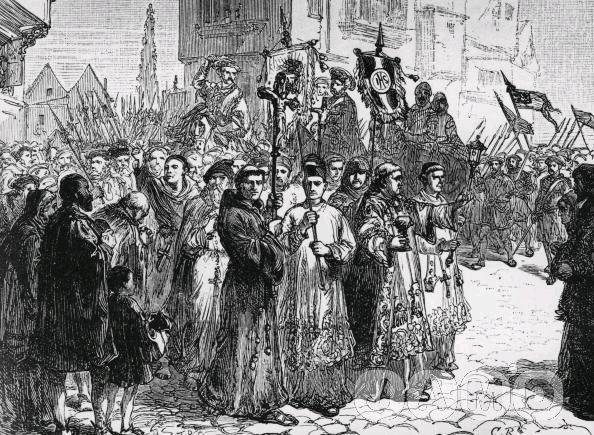
Depiction of the Pilgrimage of Grace

According to Tyson, Bevis Bulmer's "origins are shrouded in mystery". However, according to other sources, Bevis Bulmer, born in 1536, was the son of Sir John Bulmer, eldest son and heir of Sir William Bulmer (d. 1531). His mother was Margaret Stafford, said to have been an illegitimate daughter of Edward Stafford, 3rd Duke of Buckingham.

His parents were said to have been drawn into the rebellion of Robert Aske, known as the Pilgrimage of Grace, through the influence of their nephew, Sir Francis Bigod. They were executed with others in early 1537 for their involvement, in consequence of which their lands escheated to the Crown, although some were granted at a later date to Sir George Bowes (1527–1580). The circumstances of their trial and execution were recorded by the author of Wriothesley's Chronicle:

Also the 16 day of May [1537] there were arraigned at Westminster afore the King’s Commissioners, the Lord Chancellor that day being the chief, these persons following: Sir Robert Constable, knight; Sir Thomas Percy, knight, and brother to the Earl of Northumberland; Sir John Bulmer, knight, and Ralph Bulmer, his son and heir; Sir Francis Bigod, knight; Margaret Cheney, after Lady Bulmer by untrue matrimony; George Lumley, esquire; Robert Aske, gentleman, that was captain in the insurrection of the Northern men; and one Hamerton, esquire, all which persons were indicted of high treason against the King, and that day condemned by a jury of knights and esquires for the same, whereupon they had sentence to be drawn, hanged and quartered, but Ralph Bulmer, the son of John Bulmer, was reprieved and had no sentence.

And on the 25 day of May, being the Friday in Whitsun week, Sir John Bulmer, Sir Stephen Hamerton, knights, were hanged and headed; Nicholas Tempest, esquire; Doctor Cockerell, priest; Abbot quondam of Fountains; and Doctor Pickering, friar, were drawn from the Tower of London to Tyburn, and there hanged, bowelled and quartered, and their heads set on London Bridge and divers gates in London.

And the same day Margaret Cheney, "other wife to Bulmer called", was drawn after them from the Tower of London into Smithfield, and there burned according to her judgment, God pardon her soul, being the Friday in Whitsun week; she was a very fair creature, and a beautiful.

== Early years ==
Bulmer began his mining career at some of the former Bulmer properties at Wilton, North Yorkshire, and is said to have been interested in his youth in the iron smelter set up by Sir John Manners at Rievaulx Abbey, a project to which he returned in 1577 when a new smelter was being set up. According to Baldwin, Bulmer's "later surviving water and drainage works betray experience of this old monastic site’s water supply, and ideas illustrated in Georg Agricola’s De Re Metallica".

About 1562 Bulmer founded the lead and calamine mines in the Mendip Hills near Chewton, Somerset. The Mendip ores (calamine and galena) were used by Christopher Schutz from 1565 to 1586 at the smelter newly constructed by the Company of Mineral and Battery Works at Tintern. According to Baldwin, Bulmer was also "on the fringes" of the smelting operations at Dartford in which Schutz refined tons of worthless ore brought from Baffin Island in 1576–78 by Martin Frobisher.

== 1580s ==
About 1581 Bulmer visited the silver mines and smelters at Bannow Bay and Clonmines in Wexford.

In 1584 Bulmer and Sir Julius Caesar petitioned the Privy Council for a patent to build lighthouses, which Bulmer was granted. In February 1585 the Admiralty Court commissioned Bulmer and two others to assay the gold bullion on the captured Spanish ship Volante at Bristol.

On 13 March 1583 Doctor John Dee had entered into a lease at the London home of Lionel Duckett to work silver and lead mines at Combe Martin and Knap Down in Devon; however Dee left England in September 1584 in the wake of debts incurred as a result of the Frobisher expeditions in 1576–8. In 1587 Dee's lease was in some way taken over by his former pupil, Adrian Gilbert, brother of Sir Humphrey Gilbert, and John Poppler, a London lapidary. Gilbert and Bulmer then entered into a bargain whereby Bulmer would work the mine and bear the costs, and he and Gilbert would have an equal share of the profits. The mine developed by Bulmer, Fayes Mine, is said by Atkinson to have been 32 fathoms deep and 32 fathoms wide, and to have yielded Bulmer and Gilbert £10,000 apiece for the first two years of operation, although the output dropped to £1000 during the mine's final year. Dee returned to England in 1589, and on 19 December was generously compensated by Gilbert. Two "famous bowls" were later made of silver taken from Fayes Mine.

In 1586, backed by financial support from Elizabeth I and others, Bulmer mined silver and lead at the mines at Chewton in the Mendip Hills; the Queen is said to have lost £10,000 in the venture.

In 1588 he was granted a patent for a water-powered nail-making machine, and on 4 December 1588 was given licence for twelve years "to make and cut iron into small pieces to work out nails".

== 1590s ==
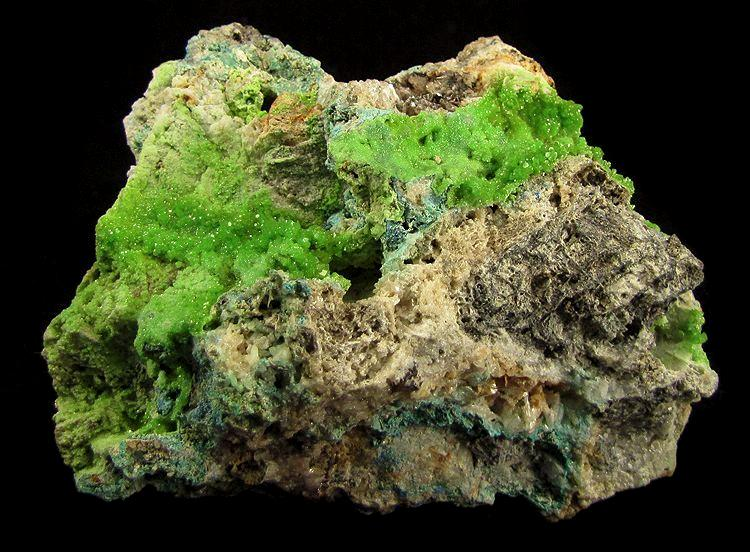
Specimen of lead ore from the Leadhills mines

In 1593 Bulmer undertook the construction of a pump to bring potable water from the Thames to Cheapside in London, a project which was completed in 1595.

In 1593 as well the Queen provided him with letters of recommendation to the Scottish government. Christopher Schutz had died in 1592, and by Act of the Scottish Parliament Bulmer replaced him in 1593 as Master of the Works for Ores from Cathay and the North West Parts. The Scots granted Bulmer a patent to explore for gold and silver at Leadhills in Lanarkshire, and from 1594 he is said to have had as a partner an Edinburgh goldsmith named Thomas Foulis who was jeweller to King James' wife, Anne. Atkinson describes in vivid prose how Bulmer made a stamping mill at Long Clough Head in the Crawford Moor area, where he got a great deal of "small mealy gold", much of which he gave away to "unthankful persons", and how at Glengaber Burn in Ettrick Forest he got the "greatest gold", sometimes like "Indian wheat, or pearl, and black-eyed like to beans", but because he "wasted much himself" and "gave liberally to many" in order to be "praised and magnified", and had always "too many irons in the fire", he impoverished himself when he could have become a rich subject.

On his return from Scotland he presented the Queen with a porringer of pure gold engraved with these verses:

I dare not give, nor yet present,
But render part of that’s thy own;
My mind and heart shall still invent
To seek out treasure yet unknown.

The Queen is said to have liked the gift so well that Bulmer was made "one of her sworn servants", and "learned to beg, as other courtiers do". As a reward, the Queen granted him in 1599 the impost on coal brought by sea, which according to Atkinson he initially farmed for £6200 per year, but later lost the grant. He was also granted the duty on imported wines. In 1599 he offered £10,000 to gain the pre-emption for the sale of all the tin produced in Cornwall.

According to Atkinson, who based much of his own The Discoveries and Historie of the Gold Mynes in Scotland on it, after his return from Scotland Bulmer compiled a manuscript account of his career which he entitled Bulmer’s Skill. It was never printed, and is now lost.

== 1600s ==
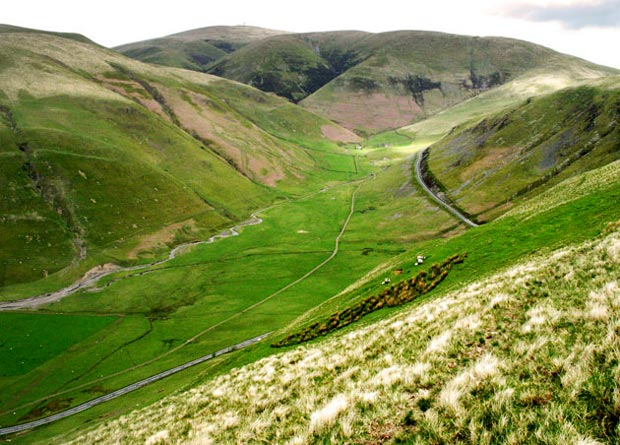
The Lowther Hills, where Bevis Bulmer searched for gold on behalf of James I

In 1603 James I and Bulmer devised a plan by which the search for gold in Scotland could be financed by making investors "Knights of the Golden Mines". Objections by Robert Cecil, 1st Earl of Salisbury to the bestowing of further knighthoods put an end to the scheme. Bulmer himself was knighted in 1604. With a free gift from the King of £100, together with a further royal grant of £200, Bulmer returned to Scotland to search for gold in the Lowther Hills in March 1605. He had 102 workmen at Bailliegill, Langcleuch (to the east and west of Bulmer Moss), Alway, and Glenlaugh. Lord Balmerino inspected the works he was running at Crawford Mure and those of George Bowes in June 1605. In 1606 the King granted him a lease of all gold and silver mines in Scotland, and he was later given further free gifts from the King of £100 in 1607 and £500 in 1608.

In February 1607 a rich silver deposit was discovered at Hilderston near Bathgate. Bulmer and Thomas Foulis opened a mine called "God's Blessing" on the lands of Sir Thomas Hamilton. King James purchased the property from Hamilton, and appointed Bulmer master and surveyor, with a grant of £2419 16s 10d to finance the project, but within two years had proved a financial disaster.

In 1611–12 Bulmer was engaged in mining at Kilmore in Tipperary. In his The Discoveries and Historie of the Gold Mynes in Scotland, Stephen Atkinson said he spent two years in Ireland with Bulmer.

Bulmer returned to England, and died "penniless", according to Tyson, in 1613. at Alston, Cumbria. Atkinson says that at his death at "Awstinmoore", Bulmer owed him £340, as well as unsatisfied debts in Ireland.

Bulmer was alluded to in Ben Jonson's play, The Staple of News (1625):

Did I not tell you I was bred in the mines
Under Sir Bevis Bullion?

== Marriage and issue ==
Nothing is known of Bulmer's marriage. However he had a son, John Bulmer, and three daughters, Elizabeth, Prudence and Elizabeth (again).

Prudence Bulmer married John Beeston in 1596, a nephew of Hugh Beeston, and after his death married in 1603, Patrick Murray, a son of Sir John Murray of Tullibardine.
