= Stephen Atkinson (metallurgist) =

English metallurgist and author

Stephen Atkinson (fl. 1586–1619), English metallurgist and author of The Discoverie and Historie of Gold Mynes in Scotland.

== Life ==
Atkinson was a native of London. Little is known of his family apart from the fact that he had an uncle, also surnamed Atkinson, who lived in Foster Lane and was close to Robert Cecil, 1st Earl of Salisbury, whom he termed his 'good Lord and friend'. A Lincolnshire yeoman, William Atkinson (d.1590), served both Salisbury's father, William Cecil, 1st Baron Burghley, and Salisbury's brother, Thomas Cecil, 1st Earl of Exeter.

After serving an apprenticeship to Francis Tiver, a refiner of gold and silver, he was admitted a finer in the Tower of London about 1586, and subsequently he was engaged in refining silver in Devonshire, from lead brought from Ireland. He tells us that he was taught his mining skill 'by Mr. B. B., an ingenious gent' (i.e. Mr., afterwards Sir Bevis Bulmer); that he spent his 'golden time' in different shires in England; and that he was for two years in Ireland with Bulmer, who died in his debt £340, having left him there 'much in debt for him.'

By a grant of the privy council of Scotland in 1616, confirmed by James I of England, he obtained leave to search for gold and silver in Crawford Muir, on paying the king one-tenth of the metals found. His brother William was included in a second lease for 21 years. It appears that he was unsuccessful in his mining operations, and consequently he wrote The Discoverie and Historie of the Gold Mynes in Scotland. This was edited by Gilbert Laing Meason for the Bannatyne Club in 1825, from a manuscript in the Advocates' Library, Edinburgh. Another manuscript is in the Harleian collection, MS. 4621. The author proposes to the king 'the opening of the secrets of the earth—the gold mines of Scotland, to make his majesty the richest monarch in Europe, yea, in all the world.' This measure was to be accomplished by moving 'twenty-four gentlemen of England, of sufficient land, to disburst £300 each,' by creating them 'for ever Knights of the Golden Mynes, or Golden Knights.' Atkinson failed to make any impression on the king, who had already expended £3,000 on the gold mines of Crawford Muir, and had obtained not quite three ounces of gold. An Account of a Curious Manuscript Volume of his work was given in David Brewster's The Edinburgh Journal of Science.

== Atkinson's story of three painters and the Scottish gold ==
Atkinson is often quoted for a story dating back 40 years before his time, during the regency of the Earl of Morton. He says that three painters, Nicolas Hilliard, Arnold Bronckorst, and Cornelius de Vos came to Scotland to look for gold. Arnold was compelled to remain in Scotland and become the court painter. However, although Arnold did become the court painter, Cornelius de Vos was the name of a contemporary mineral prospector who did work in Scotland, and some modern art-historians doubt that Hilliard came to Scotland in person. Atkinson does speak knowledgeably about the production of painting pigments from minerals.
