= Society of Mines Royal =

English mining company

- Founded: May 28, 1568; 456 years ago
- Fate: Merged with Company of Mineral and Battery Works
- Headquarters: England

The Society of the Mines Royal was one of two English mining monopoly companies incorporated by royal charter in 1568, the other being the Company of Mineral and Battery Works.

== History ==
On 28 May 1568, Elizabeth I established the society by letters patent as a joint stock company with 24 shareholders:

- Haug, Langnauer & Company, Augsburg
- Sir William Cecil
- Thomas Thurland, Master of the Savoy
- Edmund Thurland
- Roger Wetheral
- Robert Dudley, 1st Earl of Leicester
- William Humfrey of the Mint
- Benedict Spinola
- Cornelius de Vos
- Jeffrey Duckett
- Richard Springham, alderman
- James Blount, 6th Baron Mountjoy
- John Dudley
- William Winter
- George Needham or Nedham
- William Patten
- Jeffrey "Wolcheton"
- Lionel Duckett, alderman
- John Tamworth
- Matthew Field
- Edmund "Worschopp"
- Anthony Duckett of Grayrigg, Westmorland
- William Burd (treasurer to the company)
- Thomas Smythe, customer
- William Herbert, 1st Earl of Pembroke
- Richard Barnes, alderman

The establishment of the society may have been the result of the Queen's success in the Case of Mines. The new society was granted a mining monopoly for base metals in several English and Welsh counties, including some, where there were recoverable mines. It worked mines in Cumberland and had a smelting plant near Keswick in Cumberland. It also opened a copper smelting plant near Neath.

In the 1670s, the society associated itself with the Company of Mineral and Battery Works, but perhaps only informally. Its monopoly disappeared under the Royal Mines Act 1688 (1 Will. & Mar. c. 30). In the 1690s, some of its mines were leased to another mining syndicate known as Mines Royal Copper, and that enterprise subsequently became the London Lead Company.

For the later history of the company, as amalgamated with the Company of Mineral and Battery Works, see that article.
