= Lionel Duckett =

Sir Lionel Duckett
- Born: 1511
- Died: August 1587 (aged 76)
- Occupation(s): Lord Mayor of London, four times Master of the Mercers' Company
- Spouses: Mary Leighton; Jane Baskerville (née Pakington) (m. 1564–1587)
- Children: George Duckett; Thomas Duckett
- Parents: William Duckett; Jane Redman

Sir Lionel Duckett (1511 – August 1587) was one of the merchant adventurers of the City of London. He was four times Master of the Mercers' Company, and Lord Mayor of London in 1572–1573.

He was born in 1511 to William Duckett of Flintham, Nottinghamshire and his wife Jane (née Redman), of Harwood Castle, Yorkshire. He served an apprenticeship with John Colet, of the Mercers' Company of the City of London, and was granted the freedom of the Company in 1537.

He became enormously wealthy through his trading. He subscribed to Martin Frobisher's three voyages in search of the Northwest Passage, and to John Hawkins' voyage of 1562 which led to the formation of the Africa Company, paving the way for the Atlantic slave trade in later centuries.

In 1553, he acquired monastic and chantry lands in Surrey, Derbyshire and Staffordshire. In 1556, he acquired lands in Somerset and Devon. In 1572, he bought the manor of Calne, Wiltshire. He later acquired property in Gloucestershire, Wiltshire, Berkshire, and Kent.

In 1565 he served as a Sheriff of London. The next year he became Master of the Mercers' Company, a position he also held in 1571, 1577, and 1583. In 1572–1573 he was Lord Mayor of London.

He died in August 1587 and his will was proved on 20 February 1588.

== Family ==
He married twice.

1. Mary Leighton, by whom he had a short-lived son, George Duckett.
2. Jane Baskerville, (née Pakington, the widow of Humphrey Baskerville), on 29 June 1564 at St Peter, Westcheap, by whom he had a son Thomas Duckett (1566–1608).

His nephew Stephen (c.1548–1591, son of his brother John) succeeded him as lord of the manor of Calne.

Political offices
Preceded by William Allen	Lord Mayor of London; 1572	Succeeded by John Ryvers
Other offices
Preceded by William Allen	Master of the Mercers' Company; 1566	Succeeded by Roger Martin
Preceded by William Allen	Master of the Mercers' Company; 1571	Succeeded by Roger Martin
Preceded by William Allen	Master of the Mercers' Company; 1577	Succeeded by Richard Barnes
Preceded by William Allen	Master of the Mercers' Company; 1583	Succeeded by Richard Barnes
