= Schlüter =

Schlüter (also spelled Schlueter) is a German surname. Notable people with the surname include:

- Andreas Schlüter (c. 1664–1714), German baroque sculptor and architect
- Anton Schlüter München, German company
- Ann-Helena Schlüter, Swedish-German musician
- Anne Marie Vessel Schlüter (born 1949), Danish ballet dancer and wife of Poul Schlüter
- Auguste Schlüter (1849–1917), German writer
- Carina Schlüter (born 1996), German footballer
- Carl Schlüter (1846–1884), German sculptor
- Christoph Andreas Schlüter (1668–1743), German metallurgist
- Erna Schlüter (1904–1969), German dramatic soprano and voice teacher
- Johan Schlüter (born 1944), Danish lawyer
- Karin Schlüter (born 1937), German equestrian
- Karl-Heinz Schlüter (1920–1995), German musician
- Lasse Schlüter (born 1992), German footballer
- Otto Schlüter (1872–1959), German geographer
- Poul Schlüter (1929–2021), Danish politician
- Torsten Schlüter (born 1959), German artist
- Walter Schlüter (1911–1977), German race driver
- Wilhelm Schlüter (1828–1919), German naturalist

With the spelling Schlueter:

- Blake Schlueter (born 1986), American footballer
- Charles Schlueter, American musician
- Dale Schlueter (1945–1914), American basketball player
- Frank J. Schlueter (c.1874 – 1972), American photographer
- Fred W. Schlueter (1895–1969), American politician
- Jay Schlueter (1949–2010), American baseball player
- June Schlueter, American academic
- Norm Schlueter (1916–2004), American baseball player
- William Schlueter (1962-present), American tennis player

== See also ==
- Schlüter (crater), a lunar impact crater
- 6350 Schlüter, minor planet
- Schluter
- Schlyter
