= Audite =

Independent classical music record label

audite Musikproduktion is an independent classical music record label run by recording engineer Ludger Böckenhoff. Founded in Stuttgart in 1973, AUDITE merged with the Fermate label in 2000, relocating to Detmold in the process, where it is still based today. AUDITE (Listen!, imperative plural of the Latin verb audire = to listen) Musikproduktion is an international provider of classical music sound carriers.

== History ==
The AUDITE label was founded by Friedrich Mauermann in Stuttgart in 1973. Brother of the former manager of the Bavarian Radio Symphony Orchestra, Erich Mauermann, he established his reputation primarily by releasing archive recordings of the Mahler Symphonies under the chief conductor of the time, Rafael Kubelík. In 2000, Mauermann transferred the AUDITE label to Ludger Böckenhoff, who had owned his own music production company, Fermate, since 1991. As a result of the merger, the label was renamed AUDITE Musikproduktion.

== Repertoire and awards ==
Starting from the live recordings of the Mahler Symphonies with Rafael Kubelík and the Bavarian Radio Symphony Orchestra which originally represented AUDITE’s core repertoire, the label has gradually developed two focal points whilst maintaining its objective of making available to the public noteworthy repertoire in outstanding interpretations.

Historical archive recordings, issued in close collaboration with the respective broadcasting corporations, remain one of AUDITE's cornerstones. New releases are the other core area, including complete editions (such as Shostakovich String Quartets, Beethoven String Quartets and Piano Trios, Edvard Grieg's and Robert Schumann's Complete Symphonic Works, Louis Vierne's Organ Symphonies or Felix Mendelssohn's Complete Chamber Music for Strings) as well as new discoveries such as the works of Mendelssohn’s pupil Eduard Franck and his son, Richard Franck.

AUDITE's current catalogue comprises more than 350 titles in CD, SACD and LP formats, available across the globe via respective distributors; in addition, AUDITE releases are available on download and streaming platforms. Since 2023, the label has had a licensed Dolby Atmos studio.

AUDITE's recordings have won many awards, including the Preis der deutschen Schallplattenkritik, the Cannes Classical Award, the Midem Classical Award, the International Classical Music Award, the Diapason d'Or and Gramophone Editor's Choice. In 2013, AUDITE was voted Label of the Year by the jury of the International Classical Music Awards.

== Artists and ensembles ==
Artists and ensembles / orchestras who have recorded for AUDITE include:

- ARUNDOSquintett
- Balkan Chamber Orchestra
- Anna-Victoria Baltrusch
- Elisso Bolkvadze
- Boreas Quartett Bremen
- Sarah O‘ Brien
- Nicolas Bringuier
- Arthur Campbell
- Maria Canyigueral
- Cappella Murensis
- Cheng² Duo
- Sarah Christ
- Marc Coppey
- Josu De Solaun
- Jean-Baptiste Dupont
- Niek de Groot
- Romain Descharmes
- Christiane Edinger
- Edinger Quartett
- Moritz Eggert
- Detlev Eisinger
- Laura Ruiz Ferreres
- Hansjörg Fink
- Roland Glassl
- Gerhard Gnann
- Liana Gourdjia
- Hideyo Harada
- Magdalene Harer
- Hathor Consort
- Anne-Cathérine Heinzmann
- Stefan Hempel
- Thomas Hoppe
- Judith Ingolfsson
- Jacques Thibaud String Trio
- Hisako Kawamura
- Klavierduo Neeb
- Patricia Kopatchinskaja
- Sergej Koudriakov
- la festa musicale
- Les Cornets Noirs
- Elmar Lehnen
- Alexander Lonquich
- Andrea Lucchesini
- Anna Malikova
- Mandelring Quartett
- Dorothee Mields
- Morgenstern Trio
- Ulrich Roman Murtfeld
- Martin Neu
- Jimin Oh-Havenith
- Orchestre philharmonique de Strasbourg
- Guglielmo Pellarin
- Piano Duo Takahashi|Lehmann
- Franziska Pietsch
- Polish National Radio Symphony Orchestra
- Alex Potter
- Quartetto di Cremona
- Sophie Rétaux
- Hans-Eberhard Roß
- Andreas Rothkopf
- Salaputia Brass
- Martin Sander
- Christoph Schickedanz
- Ann-Helena Schlüter
- Herbert Schuch
- Schweizer Klaviertrio / Swiss Piano Trio
- Daniel Seroussi
- Oren Shevlin
- Ina Siedlaczek
- Staatskapelle Weimar
- Vladimir Stoupel
- Johannes Strobl
- Thüringer Bach Collegium
- Camilla Tilling
- Trio Lirico
- Trio Testore
- Elina Vähälä
- Dénes Várjon
- Voktett Hannover
- WDR Sinfonieorchester Köln
- Tilmann Wick
- Carsten Wiebusch
- Zagreb Soloists

== Artists of archive recordings ==
Conductors, singers, instrumentalists and ensembles re-released as part of AUDITE’s archive recordings include:

- Claudio Abbado
- Amadeus Quartet
- Géza Anda
- Peter Anders
- Ernest Ansermet
- Vladimir Ashkenazy
- Wilhelm Backhaus
- Daniel Barenboim
- Berliner Philharmoniker
- Leo Blech
- Karl Böhm
- Jorge Bolet
- Robert Casadesus
- Sergiu Celibidache
- Shura Cherkassy
- Clifford Curzon
- Solomon Cutner
- Deutsches Symphonie-Orchester Berlin
- Gioconda de Vito
- Dean Dixon
- Jacqueline du Pré
- Christian Ferras
- Annie Fischer
- Dietrich Fischer-Dieskau
- Kirsten Flagstad
- Leon Fleisher
- Maureen Forrester
- Pierre Fournier
- Nelson Freire
- Ferenc Fricsay
- Wilhelm Furtwängler
- Bronislaw Gimpel
- Friedrich Gulda
- Clara Haskil
- Antonio Janigro
- Armin Jordan
- Herbert von Karajan
- Julius Katchen
- Wilhelm Kempff
- Otto Klemperer
- Paul Kletzki
- Hans Knappertsbusch
- Rafael Kubelík
- Pilar Lorengar
- Lorin Maazel
- Igor Markevitch
- Johanna Martzy
- Edith Mathis
- Barry McDaniel
- Yehudi Menuhin
- Nathan Milstein
- Erica Morini
- Zara Nelsova
- John Ogdon
- Eugene Ormandy
- Quartetto Italiano
- Michael Rabin
- Karl Ristenpart
- Wolfgang Schneiderhan
- Carl Schuricht
- Elisabeth Schwarzkopf
- Schweizerisches Festspielorchester
- Isaac Stern
- Symphonieorchester des Bayerischen Rundfunks
- George Szell
- Paul Tortelier
- Wiener Philharmoniker
- Fritz Wunderlich
- Pinchas Zukerman
