= Rico Gulda =

- Born: 9 April 1968 (age 58); Zurich, Switzerland
- Education: University of Music and Performing Arts Vienna
- Occupations: Pianist; Conductor

Rico Gulda (born 9 April 1968) is an Austrian classical pianist and conductor.

== Biography ==
=== Early life and career ===
He was born in Zurich, as the third son of the prominent pianist Friedrich Gulda and the only child of his Japanese second wife, the pianist and composer Yuko Wakiyama.

He grew up in Munich and received his first piano lessons at the age of five. From the age of twelve, he studied with Ludwig Hoffmann and later with Noel Flores at the University of Music and Performing Arts Vienna. Master classes with Dmitri Bashkirov and Oleg Maisenberg, as well as work with his father, Friedrich Gulda, rounded out his education.

Gulda performs as a soloist, in a chamber music ensemble, and with orchestras such as the Vienna Philharmonic, the Mozarteum Orchestra Salzburg, the Bruckner Orchestra Linz.

He has performed with his half-brother the pianist Paul Gulda, as well as with the pianists Paul Badura-Skoda and Martha Argerich, the violinist Renaud Capuçon, the conductor Christian Arming, the baritones Matthias Goerne and Michael Schade, among others. He has a long artistic collaboration and private friendship with the baritone Florian Prey.

He taught piano at the Mozarteum University Salzburg, the Hansei University in Seoul, and in master classes in Vienna, Vietnam, and Japan.

In 2013, he was promoted to head of artistic planning and dramaturgy of the Wiener Konzerthaus, where he served until 2025. In 2025, he took over the management of the musical and cultural activities as general director of the Esterházy Private Foundation. He is also artistic director of the Oberösterreichische Stiftskonzerte summer festival. He is a member of the "Piano Duo" jury of the triennial Franz Schubert and Modern Music Competition.

=== Personal life ===
- Rico Gulda was married to the pianist Ferhan Önder and they have a daughter.

== Discography ==
- 1997: Rico Gulda: Schubert Klaviersonate D 784 & 3 Klavierstücke D946 (Gramola)
- 1999: Rico Gulda and Michael Badura-Skoda: Art Cult-Concert (Klavier Zu Vier Händen) (Austria Tabak, Art Cult)
- 2001: Rico Gulda: Schuman – Album Für Die Jugend Op. 68 (Naxos)
- 2002: Rico Gulda and Christopher Hinterhuber: Schubert – Piano Works For Four Hands (Naxos)
- 2008: Hermann Prey, Florian Prey, Karl Engel, Friedrich Gulda, Rico Gulda, Leonard Hokanson, Michael Krist and Wolfgang Sawallisch: Die Lieder Meines Vaters Ausgewählt Von Florian Prey (Deutsche Grammophon)
