= Piano Concerto in F-sharp minor =

Piano Concerto in F-sharp minor may refer to:

- Piano Concerto (Burgmüller)
- Piano Concerto No. 1 (Rachmaninoff)
- Piano Concerto (Scriabin)
