= Schluter =

Schluter is a surname. Notable people with the surname include:

- Albert Schluter (1923–2007), German born Australian activist for immigrant rights in Australia
- Ariane Schluter (born 1966), Dutch film actress
- Dolph Schluter (born 1955), evolutionary biologist
- John Schluter (born 1955), Australian weekday weather presenter
- Michael Schluter (born 1947), economist, author, speaker and social entrepreneur
- William E. Schluter (born 1927), New Jersey politician

== See also ==
- Schlüter
