= Christoph Andreas Schlüter =

German metallurgist and mining official

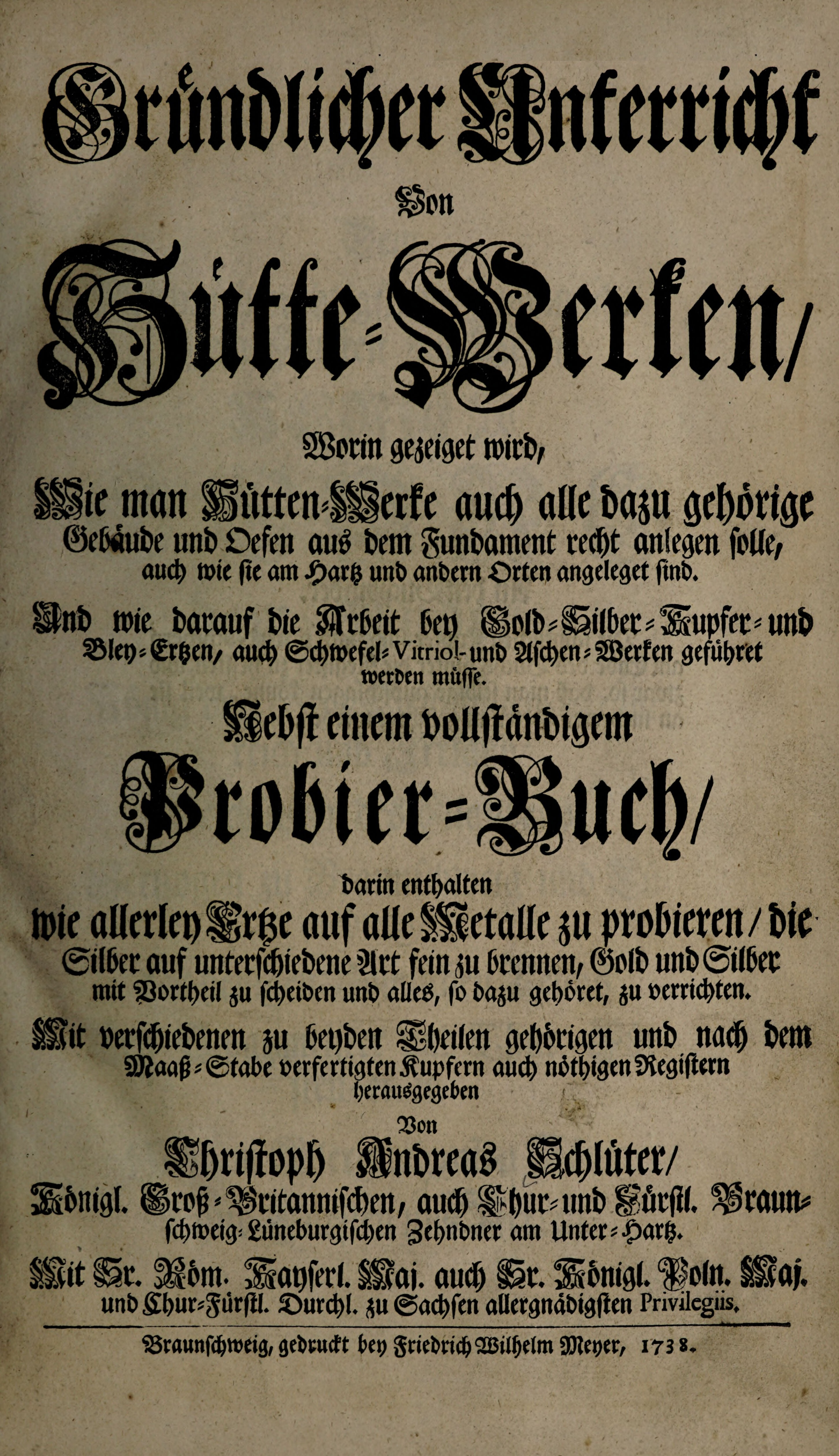
- Title page of Schlüter's Gründlicher Unterricht von Hütte-Werken (1738)
- Born: 1668; Goslar, Holy Roman Empire
- Died: 1743 (aged 74–75); Goslar
- Occupations: Metallurgist, assayer, mining official (Zehntner)
- Known for: Gründlicher Unterricht von Hütte-Werken (1738)
- Spouse: Magdalena Elisabeth Trumph
- Father: Heinrich Zacharias Schlüter

Christoph Andreas Schlüter (sometimes Latinized as Christophorus Andreas Schlüter and known in French as Christophe-André Schlutter; 1668–1743) was a German metallurgist, assayer and mining official in the Harz, and the author of one of the most important metallurgical works of the eighteenth century. He spent his career in the ducal smelting administration, rising to the senior fiscal post of Zehntner (tithe-master) of the Lower Harz. His treatise, Gründlicher Unterricht von Hütte-Werken, published in 1738, is a comprehensive account of smelting works together with a complete manual of assaying.

== Life ==
=== Family and early life ===
Schlüter was born in 1668 near Goslar. His father, Heinrich Zacharias Schlüter, was a Hüttenreiter (overseer of a smelting works) in the service of the Dukes of Brunswick-Wolfenbüttel, responsible for supervising the ducal smelters, keeping the raw silver in custody, controlling the fine-refiners, and delivering the refined silver and lead to the ducal factorage. By Schlüter's own account, his father served twenty-eight years in this post on the Lower Harz, and as such, his son was raised at the smelting works from boyhood. At the age of fourteen, he was assigned to his father to be trained as a smelting specialist.

Schlüter learned smelting at the Lower and Upper Harz works. During these years, he also traveled to Saxony and Bohemia to acquaint himself with the smelting houses there. Additionally, before 1700 he visited the Mansfeld district, and in 1701 he was at Schneeberg and Grünenthal in Saxony.

=== Career in the Harz mining administration ===
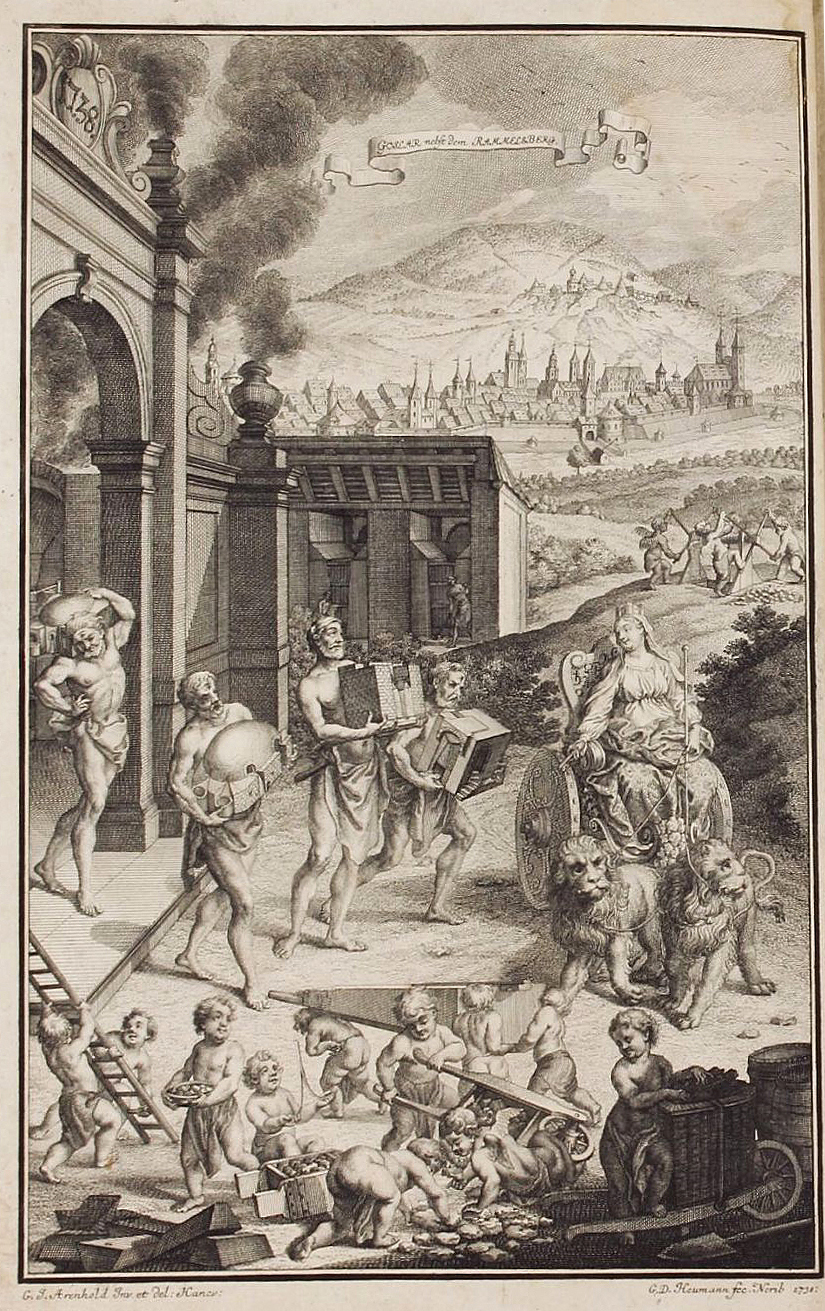
Goslar and the Rammelsberg (engraving, 1730), where Schlüter spent his career

After his father passed in 1702, Schlüter succeeded him in the office of Hüttenreiter. He later held the clerical posts of mine clerk (1709–1717) and then counter-clerk to the tithe-master, checking the accounts of the Goslar mining office. In 1724 or 1725, he became Zehntner (tithe-master) and head of the mining office. He would hold this role until the end of his life at Goslar in 1743.

During his career, Schlüter not only became familiar with smelting techniques throughout central and northern Europe but he was also a practical innovator. For example, as wood grew scarce on the Harz, he developed new furnace designs that improved fuel efficiency. From 1712, he introduced at the Lower Harz a new type of refining furnace (Treibofen) for separating silver from lead, which economized wood and was taken up on the Upper Harz works from 1719. For liquation, he succeeded in developing a furnace that could burn peat instead of charcoal for fuel: in 1734, at the Frau-Marien works, he created a liquation furnace with a separate firebox that could be fueled using either charcoal or peat. This separate firebox design saved fuel.

=== Marriage and family ===
In 1702, Schlüter married Magdalena Elisabeth Trumph, allying himself to one of the most influential families of Goslar, and in the same year he became a full citizen and a member of the Wortgilde, a local guild. The marriage was childless, which he regretted, since it left him no successor in office. His nephew, who became Hüttenreiter on the Lower Harz after him, also died young. This nephew, Christoph Franz Seidensticker, had traveled to Hungary and Transylvania, and reports and drawings of foreign smelting works brought back by him and by other friends allowed Schlüter to widen his technical knowledge.

== Gründlicher Unterricht von Hütte-Werken (1738) ==
=== Publication and structure ===
Printed at Brunswick by Friedrich Wilhelm Meyer in 1738, the work comprises two parts in one volume: the main treatise on smelting works and an appended complete Probier-Buch (assaying manual). The folio contains an engraved frontispiece, an engraved headpiece with two portraits, and 58 engraved plates. The frontispiece shows a view of Goslar with allegorical figures, while the folding plates depict numerous furnaces, buildings, machinery, implements and instruments. The work was issued under an imperial privilege of Emperor Charles VI, which set a penalty for unauthorized reprinting of six marks of fine gold, as well as under the privilege of the King of Poland and Elector of Saxony.

On the title page, Schlüter described himself as "Royal Great-Britannic, also Electoral and Princely Brunswick-Lüneburg tithe-master of the Lower Harz", reflecting the fact that the Harz was governed jointly by the two Welf lines, Brunswick-Lüneburg (Hanover), whose Elector George II was also King of Great Britain, and Brunswick-Wolfenbüttel. The book is accordingly dedicated to both: to King George II and to the reigning Duke Karl I of Brunswick-Wolfenbüttel.

=== Contents, method and geographic scope ===
Schlüter describes many different methods for extracting metals, using a range of furnace types (tapping, curved, high and wind furnaces among them), but he does not systematically compare them. His work presents knowledge gained in practice over more than fifty years. Although the greatest space is given to the Rammelsberg and the Harz, where his account rests on his own experience, he also describes installations in places such as Saxony, Bohemia (Joachimsthal), the Stolberg district (Straßberg), Mansfeld, the Halle area (Rothenburg), the Weimar area (Ilmenau), Hesse (Riegelsdorf), various sites in Hungary, Tyrol, Carinthia (Villach), Sweden (Falun), Norway, and England. The book even includes a description of an old Ottoman smelting furnace in Majdanpek. Material on works he had not seen personally came in part from his nephew and from other friends. In the book, he also mentions novel techniques he developed and engages by name with earlier authors including Georgius Agricola, Alvaro Alonso Barba, Erasmus Ebener, Lazarus Ercker, Georg Engelhardt Löhneyß and Johann Mathesius.

=== The Probier-Buch (assaying) ===
The second part of the work is a manual of assaying (Probierkunst). The main title page describes this appended assaying manual as offering instruction in how to assay all kinds of ores for all metals, to refine silver in various ways, and to part gold and silver, together with everything belonging to the art. Assaying was central to the whole early-modern metal trade, not only to Schlüter's works: it was among the most important tasks of the smelting-masters, since only by it could the right smelting method be chosen and the whole process be monitored. Beyond such process control, it served further purposes: it guarded against embezzlement by the workers, which mattered especially for the exceptionally valuable precious metals, and throughout the technical literature a thorough mineralogical knowledge on the part of the assayer was taken for granted.

=== French translation ===
A French translation, De la fonte des mines, des fonderies, &c., was edited by the chemist Jean Hellot and published in two volumes with 59 engraved plates by B. Audran in 1750–1753. It is described as a translation of the Gründlicher Unterricht von Hütte-Werken of 1738, together with some other matter, edited by Hellot.

== Death and legacy ==
Schlüter died at Goslar in 1743, having held the office of Zehntner of the Lower Harz until the end of his life. His treatise has been called "the most important mining book of the 18th century". Herbert Hoover and Lou Henry Hoover, the translators of Agricola, rated the folio "as one of the most important in the Agricola, Ercker, Löhneyss tradition", singling out its accounts of separating silver from copper and from gold as especially admirable. Ludwig Darmstaedter likewise called it "one of the finest works on metallurgy and assaying". His treatise was also the first to make England's distinctive coal-fired reverberatory smelting known in Central Europe, by describing the cupola furnaces then used across England for lead and copper.

== See also ==
- Georg Engelhardt von Löhneyss
- Georgius Agricola
- Lazarus Ercker
- Mining and metallurgy in medieval Europe
- Mining in the Upper Harz

== Works ==
- Gründlicher Unterricht von Hütte-Werken … nebst einem vollständigem Probier-Buch. Brunswick: Friedrich Wilhelm Meyer, 1738.
- De la fonte des mines, des fonderies, &c. (French translation, ed. Jean Hellot). Paris: Veuve Pissot et al., 1750–1753.
