= August Sigmund Frobenius =

German chemist (died 1741)

August Sigmund Frobenius (earliest date mentioned 1727, died 1741), FRS, also known as Sigismond Augustus Frobenius, Joannes Sigismundus Augustus Frobenius, and Johann Sigismund August Froben, was a German-born chemist in the 18th century who is known for the first detailed description of the properties of diethyl ether and the naming of this substance (Spiritus Vini Æthereus).

Not much is known about his life. He worked in London, Paris, Germany, and Italy. In the laboratory or Ambrose Godfrey in London he produced ether, following a method of Isaac Newton. His first article about ether was published 1729 in the Philosophical Transactions of the Royal Society under the title An Account of a Spiritus Vini Æthereus, Together with Several Experiments Tried and sparked a new scientific interest in this substance. This article contains an extensive description of the properties of ether but did not include experimental procedures. These missing details were, however, deposited at the Royal Society and were published in 1741 after his death by Cromwell Mortimer. At this time, the procedure had already been discovered and published by other chemists, including Georg Ernst Stahl, Friedrich Hoffmann, Johann Heinrich Pott, Grosse, Henri-Louis Duhamel du Monceau, Schulze, and Jean Hellot.

== See also ==
- Diethyl ether
