= Detlev Eisinger =

German pianist (born 1957)

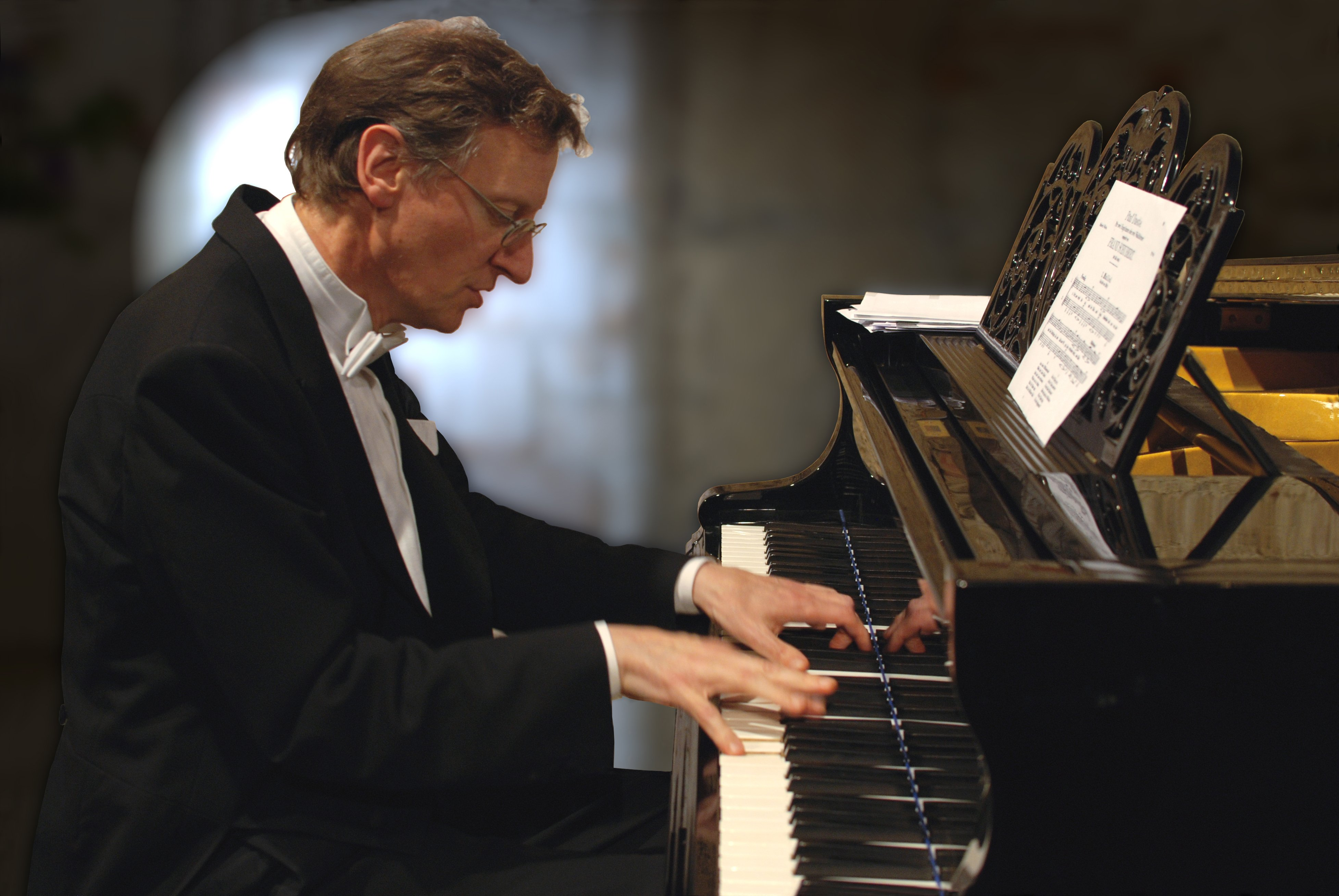
Detlev Eisinger during a concert in South Germany, May 2011.

Detlev Eisinger (born November 26, 1957, in Munich) is a German pianist.

== Life and career ==
Eisinger started playing the piano at the age of seven. At eleven he continued his studies under the tutelage of the pianist Walter Krafft (* in 1936 in Bucharest), a pupil of Florica Musicescu (1887–1969) who had also taught Dinu Lipatti (1917–1950). In 1967 Krafft founded the Munich Musikseminar and has since then been its director. He was to become Eisinger's most important mentor at the piano, and it was thanks to him that Eisinger went on to perform his first recital and his first concerto with an orchestra at the age of thirteen in Munich. From 1976 on Eisinger studied under Professor Erik Then-Bergh (1916–1978) at the Munich Musikhochschule, passing his Staatsexamen (state examination) with distinction in 1980. In 1986 he won a scholarship to the Cité internationale des arts in Paris.

By then, he had already - at the age of fourteen - made his first recordings in the studios of the Bavarian Broadcasting Corporation (Bayerischer Rundfunk), and at 16 he cut his first record, playing, amongst other things, Ludwig van Beethoven's Pathétique sonata and the Variations sérieuses by Felix Mendelssohn Bartholdy. After graduating, he began travelling widely on the concert circuit both at home and abroad. Notable among his many appearances was his performance of Johann Sebastian Bach's complete Well Tempered Clavier in Munich, Vienna, Salzburg, and Klagenfurt. He put in appearances at Menton, Paris, Montpellier, at the Kissinger Sommer (summer festival in Bad Kissingen/Germany), the Richard Strauss Festival in Garmisch-Partenkirchen and the Kodály Festival in Kecskemét, Hungary. There were also five concert tours in South Africa.

A significant landmark in Eisinger's career was his performance of Robert Schumann's Carnaval at the Münchner Klaviersommer (Munich piano summer festival) of 1990. The soloist in the second half of the concert was Friedrich Gulda. Following this, he gave his début performance at the Berliner Philharmonie with Mendelssohn's G minor Piano Concerto and went on to give piano recitals in several European capitals, in Toronto/Canada and in San Francisco/USA. A number of recordings for radio and television followed, as well as CD productions, which included some of the great cycles in the repertoire of major works for the piano.

Eisinger has also been involved in chamber music performances and has appeared as accompanist to performers of the German Lied, notably Hermann Prey and Kieth Engen.

He has fascinated audiences with his Gesprächskonzerte (musical lectures, or lecture recitals) in which he introduces and elucidates each work before playing it. The audience are then suitably prepared, so that the performance itself becomes a deep and lasting experience for them, something which has proved particularly helpful with longer works such as Bach's Goldberg Variations, or Beethoven's Diabelli Variations, and a cycle of his 32 Piano Sonatas. A lecture recital at the Villa Wahnfried in 2002 turned out to be the start of a seven-year career at the Bayreuth Richard Wagner Festival. There, from 2002 to 2008, Eisinger performed introductions to all Wagner's operas at matinée recitals, with the result that he was invited to appear at a number of other opera houses both in Germany and abroad. In 2008 he was hired for a period of several years to provide musical introductions in the same vein at the Richard Wagner Festival at Wels in Austria.

Eisinger's interpretations, while reflecting his own ideals and feelings, remain true to the spirit of the work itself. For him, to convey the spirit and intention of the composer as naturally as possible is paramount.

At present, Eisinger ist working on recordings of all the Beethoven piano sonatas. He is the first pianist to give an introduction to each sonata and to elucidate it using musical illustrations and quotations, before playing it. He is also involved in making recordings of his introductory lectures of all the Wagner operas along the lines of his matinée recitals in Bayreuth.

== Discography ==
=== Compact Discs ===
- Beethoven Piano Sonatas, complete recordings with explanatory introductions:
  - Vol. 1: Op. 2 No. 1, Op. 31 No. 3, Op. 26 (Funeral March), Op. 57 (Appassionata)
  - Vol. 2: Op. 14 No. 2, Op. 2 No. 3, Op. 109, Op. 27 No. 2 (Moonlight)
  - Vol. 3: Op. 10 No. 2, Op. 78, Op. 28 (Pastoral), Op. 13 (Pathétique), Op. 110

(series to be continued)

- Introductions to the operas of Richard Wagner with numerous musical illustrations, words spoken (German language) and music performed by Detlev Eisinger:
  - Lohengrin
  - Tristan und Isolde
  - Parsifal
- J. S. Bach: The Well Tempered Clavier, Books I and II (recorded between 1976 and 1980)
- Goldberg Variations / Schubert Sonata:
  - J. S. Bach: Goldberg Variations BWV 988
  - F. Schubert: Sonata in C minor D 958
- Piano Music from Bach to Chopin: W. A. Mozart: Sonata in A major KV 331; L. v. Beethoven: Sonata in C minor, Op. 13 (Pathétique); F. Mendelssohn Bartholdy: Rondo capriccioso, Op. 14; F. Schubert: Impromptu in G flat major, Op. 90 No. 3 (D 899); F. Chopin: Prélude in D flat major, Op. 28 No. 15 and Scherzo No. 2 in B flat minor, Op. 31; J. S. Bach: chorale arrangement Jesu Joy of Man's Desiring BWV 147.
- Paraphrases of themes from the works of Richard Wagner by Liszt, Wolf and Brassin:
  - Wagner / Liszt, from Tannhäuser: Pilgrim's Chorus - Entry of the Guests at Wartburg - Recitative and romance (Wolfram) O du, mein holder abendstern (O Star of Eve)
  - Wagner / Liszt, from Der fliegende Holländer: Spinning Chorus - Senta's Ballad
  - Wagner / Liszt, from Lohengrin: Elsa's Dream - Elsa's Bridal Procession to the Cathedral
  - Wagner / Liszt, from Tristan und Isolde: Isolde's Liebestod
  - Wagner / Wolf: Paraphrase of Die Meistersinger von Nürnberg
  - Wagner / Brassin, from Die Walküre: Magic Fire Music
- Mozart, Chopin, Liszt: W. A. Mozart: Sonata in D major KV 311; F. Chopin: Sonata No. 3 in B minor, Op. 58; F. Liszt: Variations on Weinen, Klagen, Sorgen, Zagen based on J. S. Bach
- Quiet Classics - lyrical piano music: Bach, Mozart, Mendelssohn Bartholdy, Schumann Chopin and others
- Lieder and Ballads by Wilhelm Busch (composer: Adolph Kurt Böhm, * 1926) with Florian Prey, baritone, and Detlev Eisinger, piano
- Lieder on lyrics of different poets (composer: Adolph Kurt Böhm) with Alexandra Petersamer, mezzo-soprano and Detlev Eisinger, piano.

=== Long Playing Records ===
- J. S. Bach: The Well Tempered Clavier, Books I and II
- Piano Works by Scarlatti and Balakirev: D. Scarlatti, 7 Sonatas; M. Balakirev, Sonata in B flat minor
- Piano Works by Franz Liszt: Polonaise No. 2 in E major, Liebestraum No. 3, two Franziskus-Legenden (Legends of St. Francis), Hungarian Rhapsody No. 2, Die Nachtigall (the nightingale, after Alabieff), Concert Etude No. 2 La Leggierezza
- Piano Works by Beethoven, Mendelssohn Bartholdy and Chopin: L. v. Beethoven, Sonata in C minor, Op. 13 (Pathétique); F. Mendelssohn Bartholdy, Variations sérieuses in D minor, Op. 54; F. Chopin, Fantasie in F minor, Op. 49

=== Music Cassettes ===
- Detlev Eisinger and the Bamberg Philharmonic Orchestra: F. Chopin, Piano Concerto No. 2 in F minor, Op. 21; Krakowiak, Op. 14; Don Juan Variations, Op. 2.
