= Eisinger =

Eisinger is a surname: Notable people with the name will include:

- Ari Eisinger, guitarist and singer from Pennsylvania
- Claudia Eisinger (born 1984), German actress
- Detlev Eisinger (born 1957), German pianist
- Irene Eisinger (1903–1994) German and British opera singer
- Jesse Eisinger, American journalist, currently a financial reporter for ProPublica
- Jo Eisinger (1909–1991), film and television writer whose career spanned more than forty years
- Selma Meerbaum-Eisinger (1924–1942), Romanian-born German-language poet, Jewish victim of the Holocaust
