= Eduard Franck =

German composer, pianist and music pedagogue

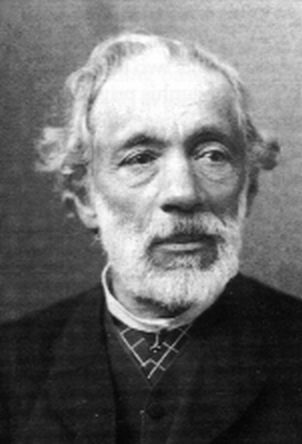
Eduard Franck

Eduard Franck (5 October 1817 – 1 December 1893) was a German composer, pianist and music pedagogue.

== Life ==
Franck was born in Breslau, the capital of the Prussian province of Silesia. He was the fourth child of a wealthy banker who exposed his children to Germany's cultural figures. Frequenters of the Franck home included Heine, Humboldt, Heller, Mendelssohn, and Wagner. His family's financial position allowed Franck to study with Felix Mendelssohn as a private student in Düsseldorf and later in Leipzig. As a talented pianist, he embarked upon a dual career as a concert artist and teacher for more than four decades during the course of which he held many positions.

Although he was highly regarded as both a teacher and performer, he never achieved the public recognition of his better-known contemporaries such as Mendelssohn, Schumann or Liszt. Despite being compared favourably to them, the fact that he failed to publish very many of his compositions until toward the end of his life, in part, explains why he was not better known. Said to be a perfectionist, he continually delayed releasing his works until they were polished to his demanding standards. Schumann, among others, thought quite highly of the few works he did publish during the first part of his life.

He was the father of Richard Franck.

== Music ==
His chamber music is generally considered amongst his finest compositions. Of the works with opus numbers, there are 3 string quartets, 2 string quintets for 2 violins, 2 violas and cello, 2 string sextets, 4 piano trios, a piano quintet, 2 sonatas for cello & piano, and 4 sonatas for violin and piano. In addition to these, there are several other works without opus, including a piano sextet, 2 piano trios, a piano quintet, a sonata for violin & piano and an occasional piece for cello & piano.

== Compositions ==
=== Chamber music ===
- Op. 6: Sonata for Violoncello and Piano in D major, 2012 critical Urtext-Edition by Pfefferkorn Music Publishers (Leipzig)
- Op. 11: Piano Trio No. 1 in E minor
- Op. 15: String Quintet in E minor (2 Vln, 2 Vla and Vc)
- Op. 19: No.1: Sonata for Violin and Piano in C minor, 2011 critical Urtext-Edition by Pfefferkorn Music Publishers (Leipzig)
- Op. 22: Piano Trio No. 2 in E♭ major
- Op. 23: No.2: Sonata for Violin and Piano in A major, 2011 critical Urtext-Edition by Pfefferkorn Music Publishers (Leipzig)
- Op. 41: String Sextet No. 1 in E♭ major, 2011 critical Urtext-Edition by Pfefferkorn Music Publishers (Leipzig)
- Op. 42: Sonata for Violoncello and Piano in F major
- Op. 45: Piano Quintet in D major
- Op. 49: String Quartet No. 1 in F minor (also known as Op.40)
- Op. 50: String Sextet No. 2 in D major, 2011 critical Urtext-Edition by Pfefferkorn Music Publishers (Leipzig)
- Op. 51: String Quintet No. 2 in C major (2 Vln, 2 Vla and Vc)
- Op. 53: Piano Trio No. 3 in E♭ major [The German National Library and Audite site list this work as being in D major, while IMSLP says E♭ major.]
- Op. 54: String Quartet No. 2 in E♭ major
- Op. 55: String Quartet No. 3 in C minor
- Op. 58: Piano Trio No. 4 in D major
- Op. 60: Sonata for Violin and Piano in E major, 2011 critical Urtext-Edition by Pfefferkorn Music Publishers (Leipzig)
- Op. posth. Sonata for Violin and Piano in D major, 2012 critical Urtext-Edition by Pfefferkorn Music Publishers (Leipzig)

=== Orchestral works (partial list) ===
- Op. 12: Concert-overture in E♭ (1848)
- Op. 13: Piano Concerto in D minor (1850); Critical Urtext-Edition edited by James Tocco, 2012 by Pfefferkorn Music Publishers, Leipzig
- Op. 30: Violin Concerto in E minor (1855)
- Op. 47: Symphony in A (1860?)
- Op. 52: Symphony in B♭ (1856)
- Op. 57: Violin Concerto in D (1860)
- Without opus?: Piano Concerto No.2 in C? (1879) (manuscript)
