= Richard Franck =

German pianist, composer and teacher

Richard Franck (3 January 1858 – 22 January 1938) was a German pianist, composer and teacher.

== Life ==
He was born in Cologne and was the son of the German composer, pianist and teacher Eduard Franck. His father, who had studied with Felix Mendelssohn and knew the value of good instruction, sent Richard to the Leipzig Conservatory, where he studied with two of the leading teachers of the day, Carl Reinecke and Salomon Jadassohn. During the course of a long career, Franck held teaching positions at conservatories in both Germany (Kassel, Berlin, Heidelberg) and in Switzerland (Basle).

Although he did not reach the front rank amongst his contemporaries, he was nevertheless well respected as a concert artist and as a composer. His conservative style was influenced by Reinecke and by his friend, the Swiss composer Hans Huber (1852–1921). Franck was firmly in the tradition of Mendelssohn and Schumann though it's clear that he was not immune from the influence of Wagner, Grieg and Reger also. Critics who were familiar with his compositions and his piano playing regularly lavished praise upon them. For example, the Schweizerische Musikzeitung (Swiss Musical Journal), writing about his First Piano Trio, Op. 20, wrote:

"Powerful and full-sounding energy is shown in many works, not least in [Richard Franck's] Op.20 Piano Trio, which is a magnificent, significant composition, fresh in invention, firm and secure in its development, and mature in its expression."

The bulk of Franck's compositions are for solo piano; however, he also wrote orchestral and vocal compositions, as well as a considerable amount of chamber music. Though he and his music have been long forgotten, as of late, his music has been rediscovered and is in the process of being revived. His piano trios, piano quartets and four sonatas have all been recently recorded on Audite, a selection of orchestra works on Sterling. Early in 2007, Edition Silvertrust republished the parts to his Op. 20 Piano Trio, the first in a series of chamber works to be released.

Within the next years, all available works of Richard Franck will be published in critical editions by Pfefferkorn Music Publishers, Leipzig.

== Works (selection) ==
=== Orchestral ===
- Piano Concerto No. 1 in D minor (1880, unpublished)
- Piano Concerto No. 2 in A major (unpublished)
- Symphony in D major (< 1901, unpublished)
- Concert Overture Wellen des Meeres und der Liebe, Op. 21 (1895)
- Serenade for Cello and Orchestra in C major, Op. 24 (1896)
- Serenade for Violin and Orchestra in A major, Op. 25 (1896)
- Suite for Orchestra in D major, Op. 30 (1899)
- Dramatic Overture in C major, Op. 37 (1903)
- Idyll Amor und Psyche in E major, Op. 40 (1905)
- Violin Concerto in D major, Op. 43 (1906)
- Piano Concerto No. 3 in E minor, Op. 50 (ca. 1907)
- Vorspiel zu einem romantischen Schauspiel op. 57 (1926, unpublished)

=== Chamber music ===
- Sonata No.1 for Violin & Piano in D Major, Op.14 - (Critical Urtext-Edition 2010 by Pfefferkorn Musikverlag / Music Publishers, Leipzig. ISMN 979-0-50139-406-6)
- Piano Trio No.1 in B minor, Op.20
- Sonata for Cello & Piano in D Major, Op.22
- Piano Trio No.2 in E Flat Major, Op.32
- Piano Quartet No.1 in A Major, Op.33
- Sonata No.2 for Violin & Piano in C minor, Op.35 - (Critical Urtext-Edition 2010 by Pfefferkorn Musikverlag / Music Publishers, Leipzig. ISMN 979-0-50139-406-6)
- Sonata No.2 for Cello & Piano in E flat minor, Op.36
- Piano Quartet No.2 in E Major, Op.41
- Three Pieces for Flute (or Violin) & Piano, Op.52
- Spanish Serenade for String Quartet WoO (1926)

=== Piano solo ===
- Drei pianostücke Op. 1, Zürich 1881
- Impromptu, Barcarolle and Etude for piano Op. 5, Berlin 1883
- Concert-Walzer for piano A flat major, Op. 10, Berlin 1885
- Drei vierhändige Stücke in Kanonform, Op. 11, Magdeburg 1886
- Tanzweisen for four-hand piano Op. 12, Breslau 1888
- Menuett for piano A minor, Op. 13, Leipzig 1890
- Suite for four-hand piano Op. 9, Leipzig 1890
- Vier pianostücke Op. 15, Zürich 1891
- Variationen über ein Originalthema Op. 16, Leipzig 1891
- Menuett and Mazurka for piano Op. 17, Leipzig 1891
- Fantasie über Motive aus der Musik zu einem Festspiele by Hans Huber C major, Leipzig ca. 1893
- Träumereien. Four pieces for piano Op. 18, Berlin 1894
- Kinderalbum Op. 19, unpublished
- Drei Clavierstücke for den Concertvortrag Op. 23, Berlin 1894
- Drei Fantasiestücke for piano Op. 26, Berlin 1899
- Fantasie(n) for piano Op. 28, Berlin 1897
- Chaconne for piano c-Moll Op. 29, Berlin 1899
- Papillon in D major, (1901)
- Acht pianostücke Op. 34, Berlin 1902
- Fantasiestück A-Dur (1903
- Waldphantasien for piano Op. 38, Berlin 1904
- Luzern. Eine Erinnerung in fröhlichen Walzern Op. 39, Berlin 1904
- Ballade for piano Op. 44, Berlin 1906
- Two Piano Pieces for the Salon Op. 46, Berlin 1907
- Scherzo for piano A flat major Op. 47, Berlin 1907
- Orientalische Skizzen for piano Op. 48, Kassel
- Gavotte and Menuett for piano Op. 49, Kassel
- Sonate for piano D flat major Op. 51, Berlin 1910
- 12 Variationen and Fuge über ein eigenes Thema Op. 53 (< 1922)
- Fantasie and Fuge über B.A.C.H. for one or two pianos
- Album for piano Op. 55, Heidelberg 1926
- Polyphone Tonbilder for piano Op. 56, Heidelberg 1926
