= James Tocco =

American concert pianist (born 1943)

- Born: September 21, 1943 (age 83)
- Origin: Detroit, Michigan
- Genre: Classical
- Occupation: Pianist
- Instrument: Piano
- Years active: 51
- Label: Sony Classical

James Tocco (born 21 September 1943) is an American concert pianist. He is the youngest of thirteen children born to Vincenzo and Rose Tocco, both Sicilian immigrants.

== Early life ==
Born of Sicilian immigrant parents in Detroit, Michigan, Tocco's love of music -especially opera—began in early childhood. At six years old he began studying piano and at twelve he made his orchestral debut, performing Beethoven's Second Piano Concerto. He won a scholarship to the Salzburg Mozarteum and a French government grant to study with Magda Tagliaferro in Paris from 1964 till 1969. His classical music education was completed with Claudio Arrau in New York. Soon afterward, he became more prominent with his first-prize victory in the ARD International Music Competition in Munich, followed being a replacement for Arturo Benedetti Michelangeli as guest soloist for the Tchaikovsky First Piano Concerto at the Vienna Festival.

== Career ==
In the years since then he has performed internationally, throughout North and South America, Europe, the Soviet Union, Japan, Australia, South Africa] and the Middle East. His orchestral engagements include:

- Cleveland and Minnesota orchestras;
- Berlin Philharmonic
- London Philharmonic
- Hong Kong and Munich philharmonics
- London, Houston, Pittsburgh, Cincinnati, Detroit, Chicago, New World, National, and NHK (Japan) symphonies.

== Conductors ==
Conductors with whom he has collaborated include:

- Marin Alsop
- David Atherton
- Esa-Pekka Salonen
- Jesús Lopez-Cobos
- Andrew Litton
- Yoav Talmi
- Robert Shaw
- Yoel Levi
- Zdenek Macal
- Eduardo Mata

== Musical Performance ==
Tocco is a recitalist, orchestral soloist, chamber musician, and educator. He has performed many American and European masterworks, including Bernstein's Age of Anxiety, which he recorded with Leonard Slatkin and the BBC London Symphony Orchestra, and John Corigliano's Piano Concerto.

The pianist's performances included his Royal Concertgebouw Orchestra debut, performing the MacDowell Concerto and Gershwin's Rhapsody in Blue, both conducted by Leonard Slatkin. An especially accomplished recitalist, Tocco has performed interpretations of Beethoven, Chopin, and Liszt, as well as 20th-century composers, and he regularly programs the keyboard works of Handel. Other performances include Bernstein's Age of Anxiety with Marin Alsop and the New York Symphony, and Leonard Slatkin and the London-based BBC Symphony orchestra.

== Discography ==
Tocco's discography includes:

- Bernstein's complete solo piano music
- Solo piano version of the Suite from Rodeo
- The complete Chopin Préludes
- The complete piano music of Charles Tomlinson Griffes
- Erwin Schulhof's Cinq Etudes de Jazz
- Bach-Liszt organ transcriptions
- Copland Music for Piano
- Various chamber music of Eduard Franck.
- Four piano sonatas of Edward MacDowell.

Recently, he performed a recording of Corigliano's Etude-Fantasy on Sony Classical.

== Educational Work ==
In addition to his itinerary, Tocco is Eminent Scholar/Artist in Residence at the University of Cincinnati College-Conservatory of Music, a faculty member at the Manhattan School of Music and professor of piano at the Musikhochschule in Lübeck, Germany. Tocco is the co-founder and original artistic director of the Great Lakes Chamber Music Festival in Bloomfield Hills, Michigan. Co-founder is James Tocco's brother, Reverend Monsignor Anthony Tocco of St. Hugo of the Hills Catholic Church.

== Honors ==
He is a National Patron of Delta Omicron, an international professional music fraternity.

== Reviews ==
- Henahan, Donal (February 5, 1986). "Recital - James Tocco, Liszt and Bach Tribute". The New York Times.
- Kozinn, Allan (August 12, 2005). "Adventures Outside the Classical Canon: Pathfinding Composers". The New York Times. "Here are some favorite contemporary recordings of the classical-music critics of The New York Times."
