= Concerto for Myself =

1988 piano concerto

- Sonata concertante for piano and orchestra
- Piano concerto by Friedrich Gulda
- Composed: 1988
- Performed: 1988: Munich
- Movements: 4

Concerto for Myself is a piano concerto by pianist and composer Friedrich Gulda who premiered it as both soloist and conductor in 1988. It is structured in four movements and included jazz features, such as am electric bassist and a drummer playing at times with the soloist. The third movement features improvisation.

== History ==
Friedrich Gulda was first known as a classical pianist, especially as a performer of Beethoven's piano concertos and piano sonatas. He later turned also to jazz and improvisation. He composed Piano for Myself in 1988 and premiered it as both soloist and conductor on 9 March 1988 as part of the Münchner Klaviersommer.

== Music ==
The work is scored for solo piano, bass guitar, drum kit and symphony orchestra. The subtitle is Sonata concertante for piano and orchestra. It is structured in four movements:

1. The New in View (... Then Old Is New). Allegro
2. Lament for U (Aria con variazioni). Adagio lamentoso, ma con moto
3. Of Me (Free Cadenza)
4. For U and U / And You and You, All of Me / For All of You: Rondo finale. Allegro vivace

A reviewer described the music as "easy-going" and immediately approachable and enjoyable". The first movement alludes to classical period concertos. The second movements is a set of variations on a lament theme. The letter U stands for Ursula Anders, Gulda's partner at the time. The third movement is a free cadenza. The finale features Latin American elements.

== Recordings ==
Gulda performed a recording of the Concerto with the Munich Philharmonic in 1988 for the Münchner Klaviersommer, which was later reissued on DVD, together with a recording of his 1983 Concerto for cello and wind orchestra from the same event, with Heinrich Schiff as the cellist. In a 2019 recording, pianist Mischa Cheung was the pianist with the Giraud Ensemble Chamber Orchestra, conducted by Sergey Simakov.

== Cited sources ==
- Godfrey, Paul Corfield (May 2014). "Friedrich Gulda (1930-2000) / Sonata concertante for piano and orchestra "Concerto for myself"". musicweb-international.com.
- Schwarzenegger, Peter (1 November 2019). "Ungetrübtes Hörvergnügen: Das Giraud Ensemble Chamber Orchestra hat Friedrich Guldas "Concerto for myself" eingespielt". klassik-begeistert.de (in German).
- "Concerto for myself - Sonata concertante for Piano and Orchestra". Music Austria. 1 March 2020.
