= Schlyter =

Surname list

Schlyter, formerly Schlytern and Schlüter, is a family, known since the 14th century, that originated in Brabant but moved to Germany and Denmark, possibly because of religious persecution. The family came to Sweden from Pomerania with Herman Schlüter around 1592. In Blekinge, Sweden, members of the Schlyter family were mayors of the locality of Ronneby for about 100 years. When the city of Karlskrona, Sweden, was founded, the Schlyter family was at the forefront.

People with the surname Schlyter include:

- Carl Schlyter (born 1968), Swedish politician
- Carl Johan Schlyter (1795–1888), Swedish jurist and publisher
- Caroline Schlyter (born 1961), Swedish artist
- Charlotta Schlyter (born 1965), Swedish diplomat
- Karl Schlyter (1879–1959), Swedish jurist and politician

== See also ==
- Schlüter
