= John Pettus (courtier) =

English politician

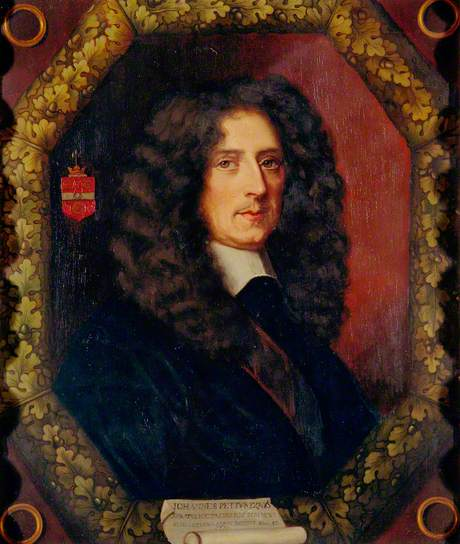
Sir John Pettus

Sir John Pettus (1613–1690) was an English royalist, politician and natural philosopher. Pettus was an expert on metallurgy and became a deputy governor of the royal mines in England and Wales under Charles I and II. He is known for the first English translation of the work of the German metallurgist Lazarus Ercker.

== Life ==
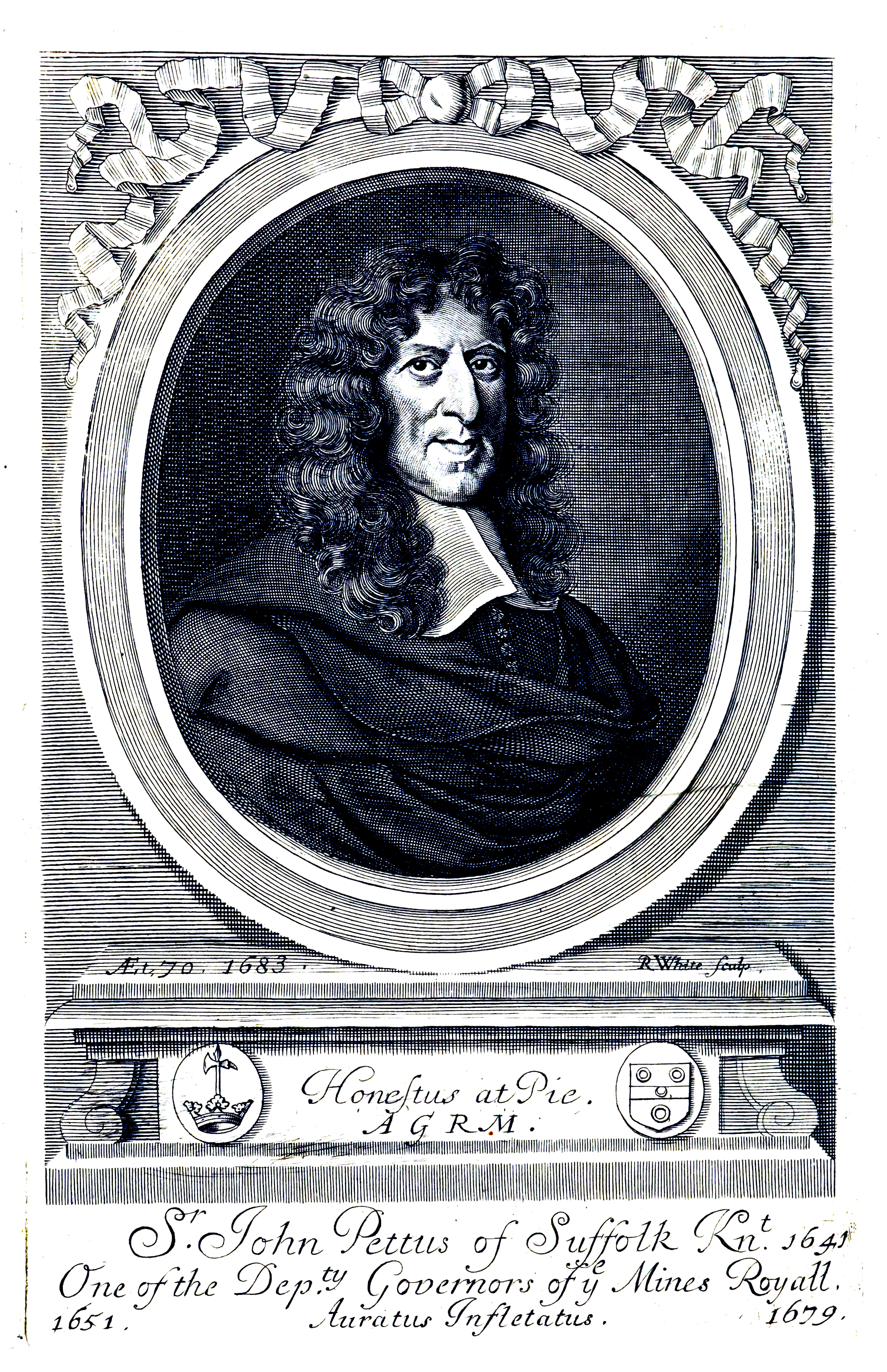

He was the third son of Sir Augustine Pettus of Rackheath, Norfolk, by his second wife, Abigail, third daughter of Sir Arthur Heveningham of Heveningham, Suffolk. He matriculated at Pembroke College, Cambridge in 1632. He entered the service of Charles I in 1639, and was knighted on 25 November 1641, as a mark of the king's favour to Sir Richard Gurney, his father-in-law. Taken prisoner during the First English Civil War by Oliver Cromwell at Lowestoft, he was exchanged after 14 months' confinement in Windsor Castle.

Pettus then raised a regiment of horse, at his own expense; but moved on to garrison work, at Bath and Bristol. At the 1645 siege of Bristol his life was saved by Colonel Charles Fleetwood, a relation by marriage. Four charges were brought against him by the parliamentary committees of Norfolk and Suffolk, to two of which he gave satisfactory answers on his examination by the committee of sequestrations in September 1645. In November 1646 the remaining two charges were still unheard. In that year, however, he compounded, receiving support from Charles Fleetwood, whose friendship for him then caused Pettus to be suspected of disloyalty to the royalist cause. He took part in attempts to save the life of Charles I, and had to sell some of his property to meet the expenses.

After the king's execution Pettus supplied Charles II with money from time to time. He was confined by John Bradshaw for corresponding with the young king Charles, but after examination by the Council of State he was set free on bail of £4,000. In August 1651 he was assessed again but he was deep in debt, and paid only £40. In 1655 he addressed a petition to Cromwell, expressing fidelity to his government, and became deputy governor of the royal mines.

In 1663 Pettus became a Fellow of the Royal Society. He was elected Member of Parliament for Dunwich on 21 March 1670, and in 1672 he was appointed deputy lieutenant for Suffolk, deputy to the vice-admiral, and colonel of a regiment of the trained bands. In these post he saw service during the Third Anglo-Dutch War, and was instrumental in raising £10,000 for the sick and wounded.

Originally wealthy, Pettus had purchased Cheston Hall, Suffolk, and other estates, but in later life was imprisoned for debt. In July 1679 he wrote to William Sancroft from the King's Bench Prison, begging for a loan to set him free, and in 1683 he was said to be without financial resources. He remained deputy governor of the royal mines for more than 35 years, with a short break, and died in 1690.

== Works ==
Pettus published:

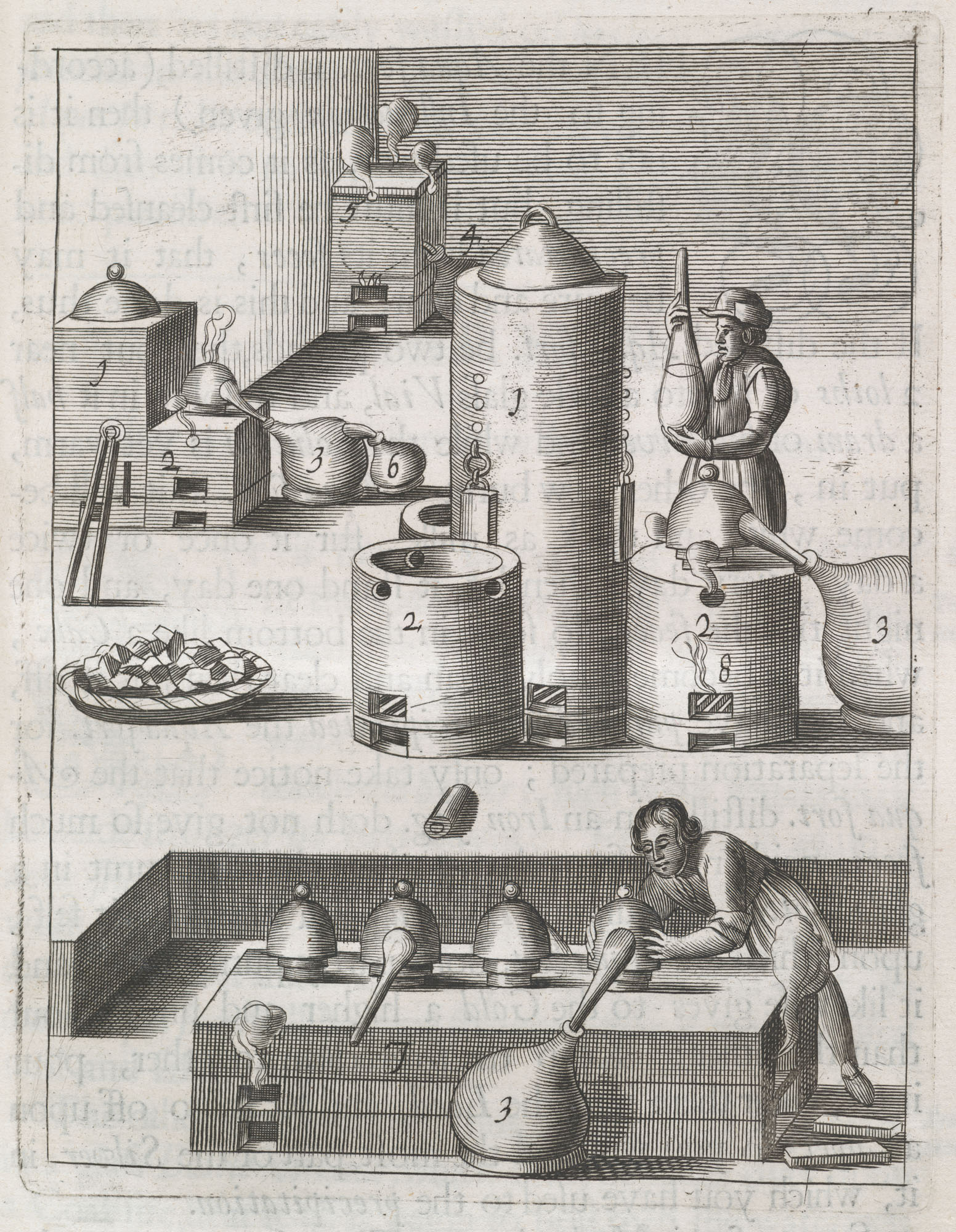
Illustration from Fleta Minor (1683) on copper assaying

- Fodinæ Regales; or the History, Laws, and Places of the chief Mines and Mineral Works in England, Wales, and the English Pale in Ireland, as also of the Mint and Mony ... with a clavis, London, 1670. This work was undertaken at the request of Prince Rupert and the Earl of Shaftesbury.
- England's Independency upon the Papal Power, London, 1674, consisting of reports by Sir John Davies and Sir Edward Coke, with a preface by Pettus.
- Volatiles from the History of Adam and Eve, containing many unquestioned Truths and allowable Notions of several Natures', London, 1674.
- The Case and Justification of Sir J. Pettus ... concerning two charitable Bills now depending in the House of Lords, under his care, one for the better settling of Mr. Henry Smith's Estate ... the other for settling of charitable uses in the Town of Kelshall, [London], 1677–8.
- The Constitution of Parliaments in England, deduced from the time of King Edward II, illustrated by King Charles II, in his Parliament summon'd the 18 of Feb. 1660–1, and dissolved 24 Jan. 1678–9, with an Appendix of its Sessions, London, 1680.
- Fleta Minor, or the Laws of Art and Nature ... in ... assaying, fining, refining ... of confin'd Metals, London, 1683. Translation from Aula Subterranea (Prague, 1574) by Lazarus Ercker.

He left also unpublished and unfinished works, including an autobiography to 1645.

== Family ==
Pettus married Elizabeth Gurney in 1639. They had two children:

- Richard, who died in 1662
- Elizabeth, who married Samuel Sandys, and died on 25 May 1714, aged 74.

Relations with his wife were unhappy. She deserted him in 1657, returned after five years' absence, but after a short time left him again and entered a nunnery. In 1672 she secured his excommunication. In defence of his conduct he published A Narrative of the Excommunication of Sir J. Pettus, of the County of Suffolk ... obtained against him by his lady, a Roman Catholic ... with his ... Answers to several aspersions raised against him by her, London, 1674.

== Notes ==
Attribution

This article incorporates text from a publication now in the public domain: Lee, Sidney, ed. (1896). "Pettus, John". Dictionary of National Biography. Vol. 45. London: Smith, Elder & Co.
