= Wolfgang Leibnitz =

German pianist

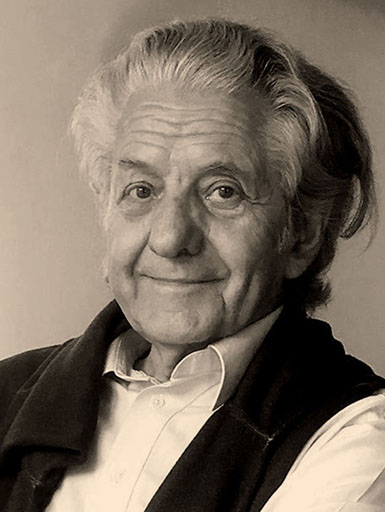
Wolfgang Leibnitz (1998)

Wolfgang Leibnitz (born 1936 in Meerane) is a German classical pianist.

== Einspielungen ==
- Franz Schubert: Sonate B-Dur, Moments musicaux, NYX, Holzkirchen 1999 (CD).
- Klaviersuiten des 20. Jahrhunderts von Debussy, Bartók, Strawinsky und Baur, VDE-Gallo, Lausanne, 2001 (CD).
- Frédéric Chopin: Sonata b-Moll, 24 Preludes, VDE-Gallo, Lausanne, 2002 (CD)
- Frédéric Chopin: Selected piano pieces, VDE-Gallo, Lausanne, 2002 (CD)
- Franz Liszt: Les jeux d´eau à la Villa d´Este, Sonata H-moll, Mephisto Walzer, VDE Gallo 2008 (CD)
- Klassische Klavierstücke von Leibnitz, Haydn, Mozart und Beethoven, VDE-Gallo, Lausanne, 2011 (CD)
- Robert Schumann, Papillons Opus 2 among others, VDE-Gallo, Lausanne, 2011 (CD)
- Franz Schubert: Klavierwerke, VDE-Gallo, Lausanne, 2011

== Bibliography ==
- in Erika von Borries (2007). Wilhelm Müller - Der Dichter der Winterreise - Eine Biographie. München: C.H. Beck Verlag. p. 317. ISBN 978-3-406-56212-9., with two CDs, CD 1: Gert Westphal liest Die Winterreise und Die schöne Müllerin. CD 2: Neueinspielung der Winterreise (Schubert) by Florian Prey (baritone) and Wolfgang Leibnitz (piano).
