= Georg Engelhardt von Löhneyss =

German nobleman and cameralist

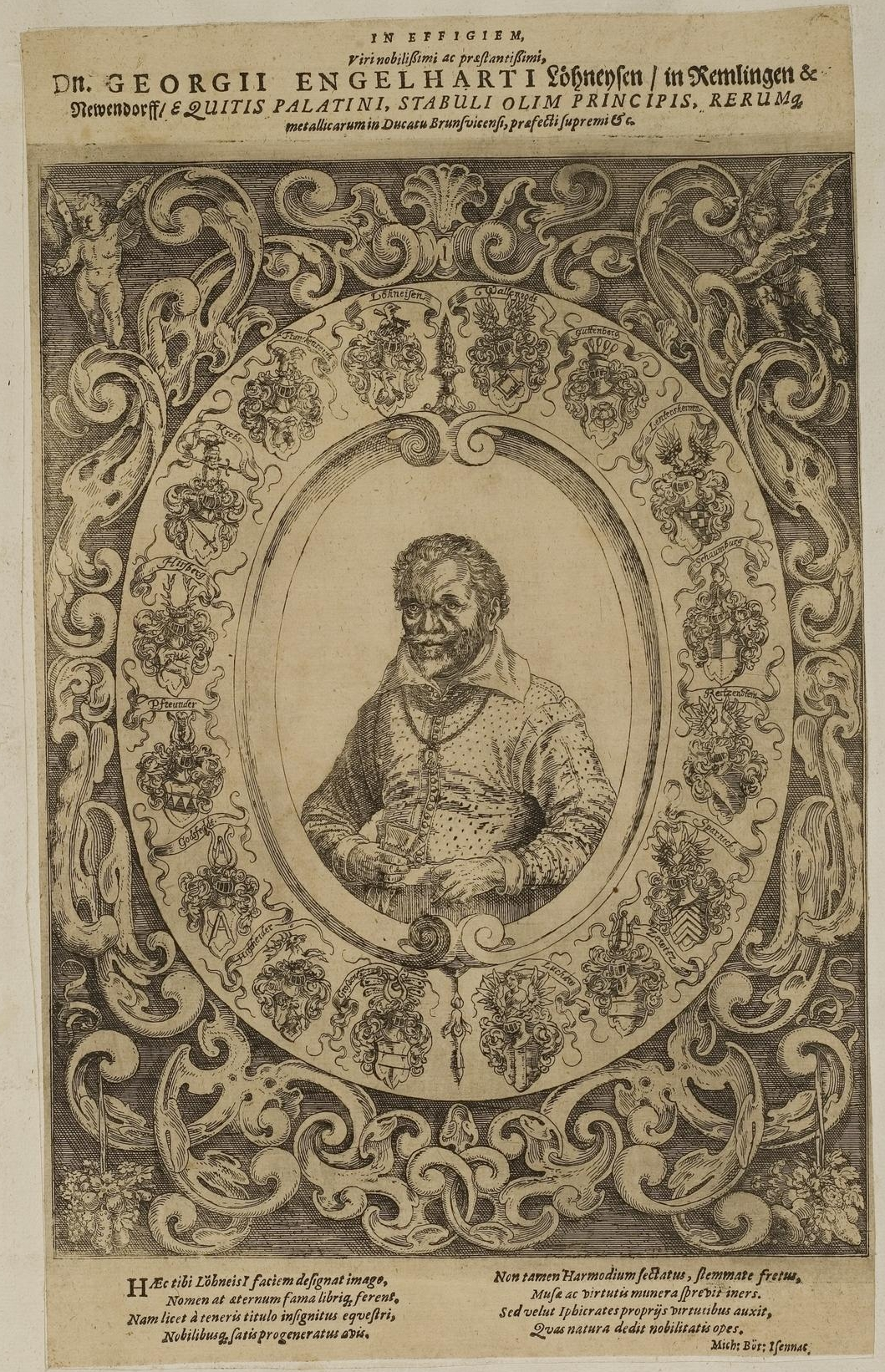
Engraving of von Löhneyß

Georg Engelhardt von Löhneyß (also Löhneiß, Löhneyß, Löhneyßen) (7 March 1552 – 1 December 1622) was a German nobleman and cameralist known for printing plagiarized but carefully produced books, including one on mining. He served as an economic advisor in the courts of Elector Augustus I of Saxony and Heinrich Julius of Braunschweig-Wolfenbüttel.

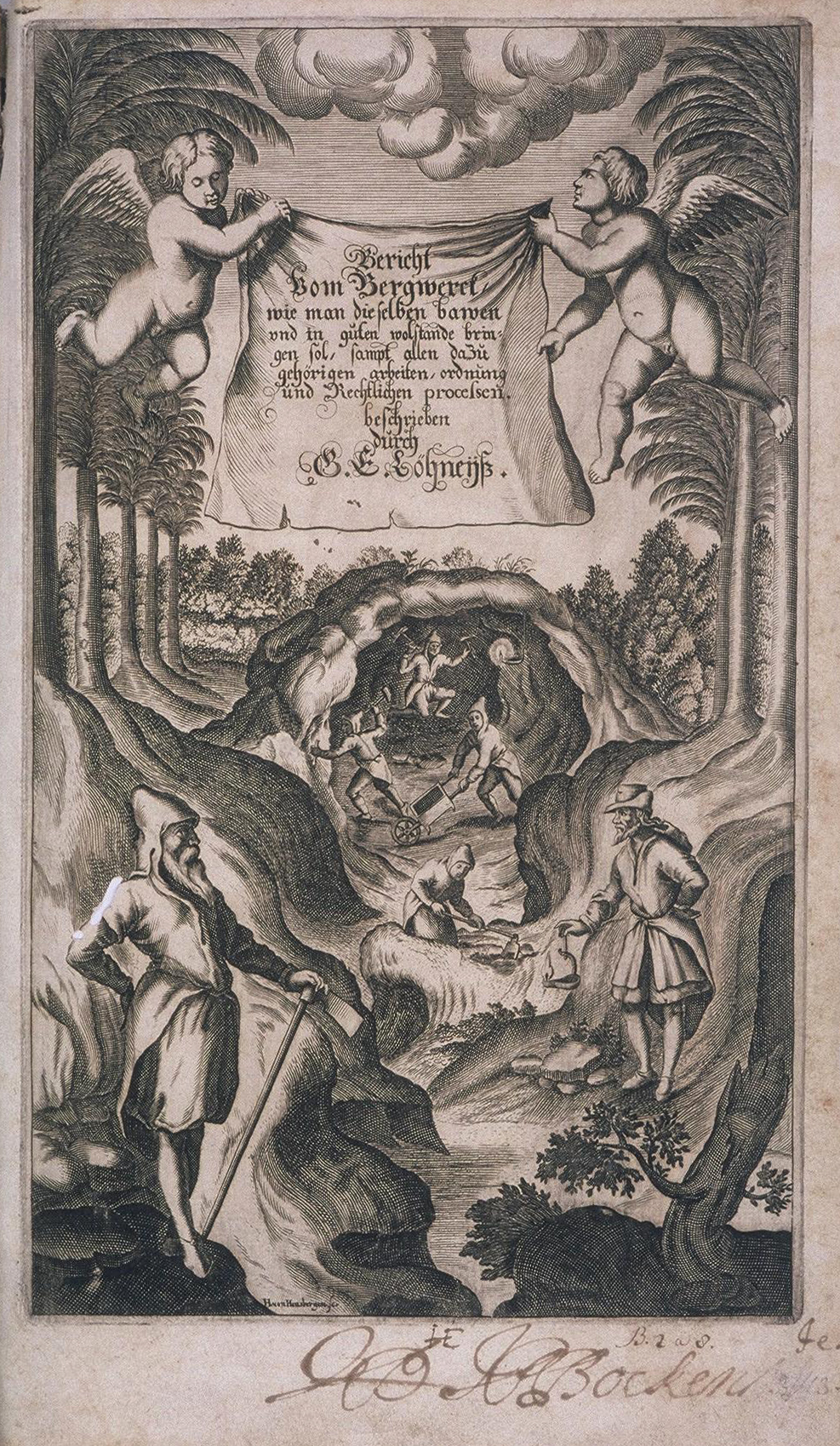
Title page of Bericht vom Bergwerck

Löhneyß was born in Witzlasreuth in a noble family and was educated at Würzburg and Coburg. At 16 he took part in the Second Huguenot War and joined the service of Count Georg Friedrich von Brandenburg-Ansbach. In 1575 he moved to the Court of Elector Augustus as a stable master and trainer in riding and fencing. In 1583 he joined Duke Julius of Braunschweig-Wolfenbüttel as stable master in Gröningen as stable master. He acquired Remlingen estate, setting up a printing company in 1596. He gained information on mining in the Saxony mountains and was given the charge of mining as a mining captain in 1589 in the Upper Harz by Duke Heinrich Julius. He then moved to work under Duke Friedrich Ulrich at Zellerfeld but he fell out with the duke in 1619 and lived at Remlingen publishing various books. The printing presses were destroyed in 1625 during the Thirty Years' War.

Löhneyß books are richly decorated with copperplate engravings although the text was plagiarized from the works of others such as Lazarus Ercker and Georgius Agricola. His books include Cavalleria (1609), Bericht vom Bergwerk (1617), and the posthumous Aulico Politica (1624) which influenced other writers like Veit Ludwig von Seckendorff.
