= Hermann Prey =

German lyric baritone (1929–1998)

Hermann Prey

Hermann Prey ([praɪ] Berlin, 11 July 1929 – Krailling, 22 July 1998) was a German lyric baritone, who was equally at home in the Lied, operatic and concert repertoires. His American debut was in November 1952, with the Philadelphia Orchestra and Eugene Ormandy, and his American recital debut took place in 1956, at New York's Carnegie Hall. As a Lieder singer, he was a gifted interpreter of Schubert, including his song-cycles Die schöne Müllerin and Die Winterreise and the collection of songs Schwanengesang, as well as of Robert Schumann, Richard Strauss and Gustav Mahler. He also appeared frequently as a soloist in Bach's Passions and Brahms' A German Requiem.

== Early life and education ==
Hermann Prey was born in Berlin and grew up in Germany. He was scheduled to be drafted when World War II ended. He studied voice at the Hochschule für Musik in Berlin and won the prize of the Frankfurt contest of the Hessischer Rundfunk in 1952.

== Career ==
=== Repertoire and notable roles ===
He began to sing in song recitals and made his operatic debut the next year with the Hessisches Staatstheater Wiesbaden in Bad Salzschlirf (Moruccio in Eugen d'Albert's Tiefland). He joined Hamburg State Opera's resident company, where he sang until 1960. During his last years in Hamburg, he also made frequent guest appearances elsewhere, including the Salzburg Festival.

He sang frequently at the Metropolitan Opera between 1960 and 1970 (and as late as the early 1990s), and made his Bayreuth debut in 1965 as Wolfram (Tannhäuser), returning there 1966–67, 1981–84 and 1986. Although he often sang Verdi early in his career, he later concentrated more on Mozart and Richard Strauss. Prey was well known for playing Figaro (Mozart and Rossini), but he played other Mozart roles at least equally often, particularly Papageno and Guglielmo. He also played, and recorded, the Count in The Marriage of Figaro, and occasionally performed as Don Giovanni. He is regarded by some as the best Eisenstein (from Die Fledermaus by Johann Strauss II) ever.

He was at home with comic opera Italian-style, displaying scenic intelligence, liveliness and hilarity. His virtuoso agility and great comic acting made him an obvious choice for numerous productions of Mozart's and Rossini's operas in the 1970s. In 1972 he performed as Figaro in Jean-Pierre Ponnelle's television film of Rossini's Il Barbiere di Siviglia with Teresa Berganza as Rosina, Luigi Alva as Almaviva and conductor Claudio Abbado. He appeared alongside Fritz Wunderlich and Hans Hotter in the live televised version of Il Barbiere di Siviglia in its German translation, Der Barbier von Sevilla. He also portrayed Figaro in 1976 in Ponnelle's film of Mozart's Le nozze di Figaro.

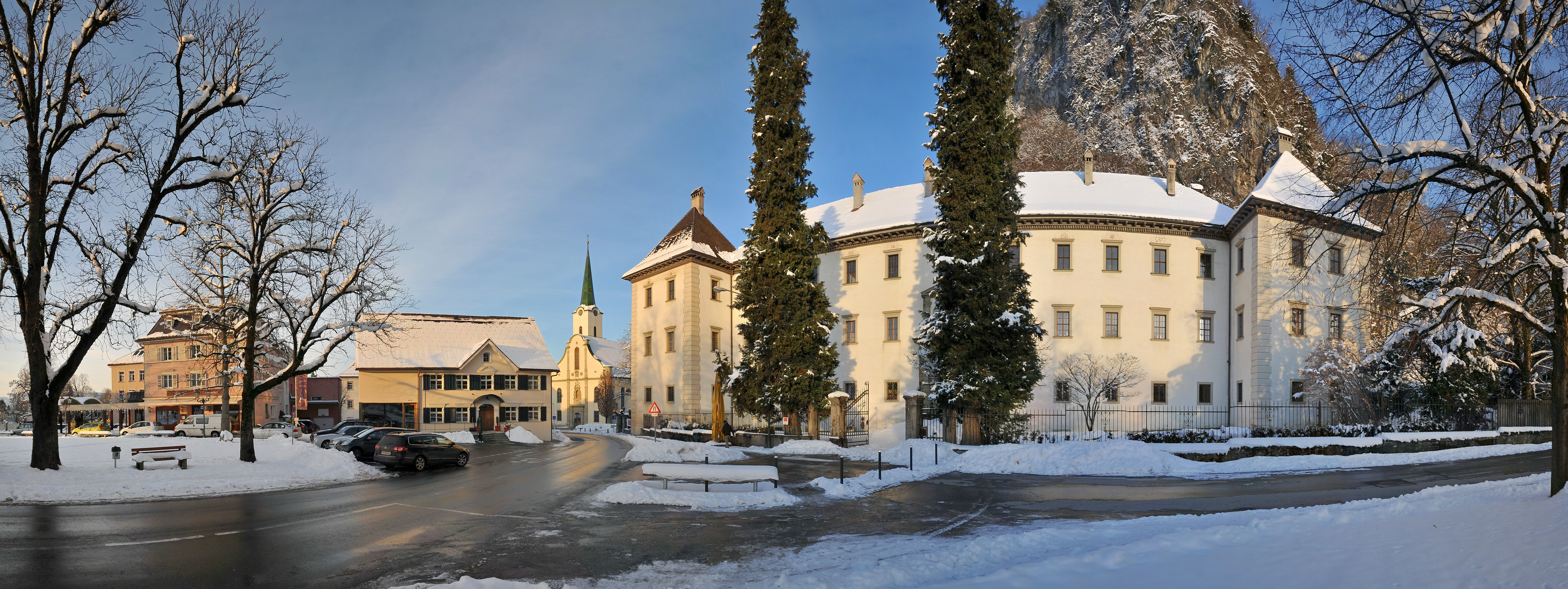
The Hohenems Palace was the first venue of the Schubertiade Vorarlberg

In 1976, Hermann Prey organised the first Schubertiade Vorarlberg in Hohenems, Vorarlberg. A Schubertiade is an event dedicated to the life and works of the Austrian composer Franz Schubert. On May 8, 1976, the first Schubertiade Vorarlberg evening begins with a recital by Hermann Prey, with Leonard Hokanson on the piano.

Prey also sang operetta and performed on German television, becoming extremely popular with television audiences. He shared media-celebrity with Fritz Wunderlich until the latter's early death, often playing Papageno to Wunderlich's Tamino. Unlike Fischer-Dieskau, Prey limited his Wagner to the soft, high-baritone roles Wolfram and Beckmesser. He can be seen on video in the latter role, opposite Bernd Weikl.

In 1988, he directed a production of The Marriage of Figaro in Salzburg.

=== Voice ===
Prey possessed a clear and polished vocal tone. His voice was darker and deeper than that of his slightly older contemporary Dietrich Fischer-Dieskau, while also allowing him to sing in the tenor range with apparent ease.

=== Recordings ===
He recorded a multi-volume set for Phillips, tracing the history of the Lied from the Minnesänger to the twentieth century. In addition, he released numerous recordings of opera and song.

=== As a teacher and writer ===
Starting in 1982, he taught at the Hochschule für Musik und Theater Hamburg, and he wrote an autobiography which was translated as First Night Fever: The Memoirs of Hermann Prey (ISBN 0-7145-3998-8).

=== Collaborative pianists ===
Pianists who collaborated with Hermann Prey in recitals and/or recordings of Lied repertoire include Karl Engel, Gerald Moore, Wolfgang Sawallisch, Leonard Hokanson, Helmut Deutsch, Friedrich Gulda, Jörg Demus, Walter Klien and Michael Endres. Florian Uhlig played for one of his last recordings of September 1997 at Herbstliche Musiktage Bad Urach.

== Death ==
He died in Krailling, Bavaria, of a heart attack on July 22, 1998, at the age of 69.

== Family ==
His son Florian is also a baritone.

== Videography ==
- The Metropolitan Opera Gala 1991, Deutsche Grammophon DVD 073 458
- Il Barbiere di Siviglia 1972, London Symphony Orchestra, Deutsche Grammophon DVD
