= Leonard Hokanson =

American pianist (1931–2003)

Leonard Hokanson (August 13, 1931 – March 21, 2003) was an American pianist who achieved prominence in Europe as a soloist and chamber musician.

== Early life and education ==
Born in Vinalhaven, Maine, he attended Clark University in Worcester, Massachusetts and Bennington College in Vermont, where he received a master of arts degree with a major in music. He made his concert debut with the Philadelphia Orchestra at the age of eighteen. He was drafted into the U.S. Army after graduate school, and in December 1955, he was a private performing in the 11th Airborne Division Band at Fort Campbell, Kentucky. Later, he was posted to Augsburg, Germany.

== Career ==
He achieved early recognition as a performer in Europe, serving as a soloist with such orchestras as the Berlin Philharmonic, the Rotterdam Philharmonic, and the Vienna Symphony. He was awarded the Steinway Prize of Boston and was a prizewinner at the Busoni International Piano Competition in Bolzano, Italy. His numerous international music festival appearances included Aldeburgh, Berlin, Echternach, Lucerne, Prague, Ravinia, Salzburg, Schleswig-Holstein, Tanglewood, and Vienna.

One of the last pupils of Artur Schnabel, Hokanson also studied with Karl-Ulrich Schnabel, Claude Frank, and Julian DeGray. He was professor of piano at the Frankfurt University of Music and Performing Arts for ten years before taking a position as professor of piano at the Indiana University Jacobs School of Music in Bloomington in 1986. He was also a permanent guest professor at the Tokyo College of Music.

He was a founding member of the Odeon Trio and as a chamber musician performed with such ensembles as the Vermeer Quartet, the St. Lawrence Quartet, the Ensemble Villa Musica, and the Wind Soloists of the Berlin Philharmonic and frequently performed duo recitals with the violinist Miriam Fried, the clarinetist James Campbell, and the horn player Hermann Baumann. As a pianist for song recitals, he played with numerous singers, including Martina Arroyo, Grace Bumbry, Melanie Diener, Edith Mathis, Edda Moser, and Hermann Prey. His collaboration with Prey extended over 25 years. He was also resident pianist with Bay Chamber Concerts in Rockport, Maine.

Hokanson's many recordings include the complete piano works of Walter Piston, Haydn sonatas, Mozart concertos, and Brahms intermezzi, as well as Schubert's complete works for violin and piano with Edith Peinemann, Brahms' sonatas for clarinet and piano with James Campbell, Beethoven's complete songs with Hermann Prey and Pamela Coburn, the complete piano trios of Brahms, Dvořák, and Schubert (Odeon Trio), previously unrecorded early piano works of Schubert, and Norbert Burgmüller's Concerto for Piano and Orchestra.

In 2001 Hokanson became professor emeritus at Indiana University but continued teaching solo piano, chamber music, and a German art song class at the school until his death in Bloomington, Indiana, from pancreatic cancer on March 21, 2003.

== Discography ==
Harpsichord

Bach

- Brandenburg Concerto Nr. 5 (Philips)
- Musical Offering (Erato, Musical Heritage)
- Orchestra Suites (Classette)
- Concertos for Oboe/Oboe and Violin (Erato)

Telemann

- Fantasies for Harpsichord (Philips)
- St. Mark Passion (Philips)
- St. Matthew Passion (Philips)

Baroque Airs and Adagios (Philips)

Il Canone di Pachelbel, Telemann, Vivaldi, etc. (Erato)

Solo Piano

Beethoven/Liszt

- Symphony Nr. 8 (transcribed for piano) (Archiv Produktion/Deutsche Grammophon)

Brahms

- Intermezzi Op. 117, 118, 119; Scherzo Op. 4 (Bayer)

Burgmüller

- Concerto for Piano and Orchestra (MDG)

Haydn

- Piano Sonatas (Bayer)

Mozart

- Piano Concerto in E-flat, K. 271 (Bayer)
- Piano Concertos in E-flat, K. 271 and G, K. 453 (Capriccio, Pilz)

Piston

- Complete Works for Piano (Northeastern)

Schubert

- Sonata in A, Op.Posth. (RCA)
- "Grazer" Fantasy (Bärenreiter)
- The Young Schubert (Northeastern)

Chamber Music

Bach

- Sonatas for Cello and Piano (Angelica May) (Musicaphon)

David Baker

- Sonata for Clarinet and Piano (James Campbell) (Cala)

Beethoven

- Sonata for Piano and Cello, Op.102/1; Variations for Piano and Cello (Angelica May) (Musicaphon)
- Works for Flute and Piano (Kurt Redel) (Pierre Verany label)
- Piano Trios Op.70/1 and 2 (Odeon Trio) (Musicaphon)
- Piano Trios (Salzburg Mozart Trio/Fortepiano) (Harmonia Mundi, Musical Heritage)

Beethoven, Czerny, Kruft, Strauss

- Works for Horn and Piano (Hermann Baumann) (Philips)

Brahms

- Complete Sonatas for Violin and Piano (Jenny Abel) (Harmonia Mundi)
- Piano Trios (Odeon Trio and Rainer Moog) (RCA, Quintessence, Musical Heritage, Capriccio)

Brahms, Franck

- Sonatas for Cello and Piano (Angelica May) (Musicaphon)

Brahms, Genzmer

- Piano Trios (Odeon Trio) (Impression)

Brahms, Jenner

- Sonatas for Clarinet and Piano (James Campbell) (Marquis Classics)

Brahms, Shostakovich

- Piano Trios (Odeon Trio) (Impression)

Chopin, Martinu

- Sonatas for Cello and Piano (Angelica May) (Musicaphon)

Dvořák

- Piano Trios and Quartets (Odeon Trio and Rainer Moog) (Pro Arte/RCA)

Bernhard Heiden

- Sonata for Piano, Four Hands (Cordula Hacke) (Cadenza)

Mozart

- 6 Piano Trios (Salzburg Mozart Trio/Fortepiano) (Harmonia Mundi, Musical Heritage)
- Early Piano Trios, K. 10–15 (Salzburg Mozart Trio/Fortepiano) (Musical Heritage)
- Piano Quartets (Salzburg Mozart Trio and Jürgen Geise/Fortepiano) (Musicaphon, Musical Heritage)

Pflüger

- Impeto (Hermann Baumann) (Bayer)

Piston

- Piano Quintet (Portland String Quartet) (Northeastern)

Saint-Saëns

- Chamber Music for Winds (Ensemble Villa Musica) (MDG)

Schubert

- Chamber Music for Violin (Edith Peinemann) (Bayer)
- Piano Trios (Odeon Trio) (RCA, Pro Arte, Capriccio)
- Trout Quintet; Nottorno (Ensemble Villa Musica) (Naxos)
- Schubertiade 1977 – Vienna (Odeon Trio, Hermann Prey) (ATW)

Schumann

- Sonatas, Op. 105 and 121; Romances No. 1–3, Op. 94 (Charles Neidich) (Sony Classical)

Spohr, Volkmann

- Piano Trios (Odeon Trio) (Impression)

Strauss

- Piano Trios (Odeon Trio) (Capriccio)

Tanejev, Tcherepnin

- Piano Trios (Odeon Trio) (Pro Arte/RCA)

Weber

- Grand Duo Concertant, Op. 48, 7 Variations op. 33 (James Campbell) (Marquis Classics)

Music in the Salzburg Mozart House (Eberhard Finke, Rudolf Klepač/Fortepiano) (Amadeo)

Lieder

Beethoven

- Complete Songs (Hermann Prey, Pamela Coburn) (Capriccio)

Cornelius

- Christmas Songs, Vaterunser (Hermann Prey) (Deutsche Grammophon)

Mendelssohn, Liszt, Franz, Wagner

- Romantic Songs (Hermann Prey) (Philips)

Schubert

- Die schöne Müllerin (Hermann Prey) (Philips)
- Schwanengesang (Hermann Prey) (Deutsche Grammophon)
- Schubertiade Hohenems 1977 (Vocal Ensembles) (Deutsche Grammophon)
- Songs (Edda Moser) (EMI Classics)

Schubert, Schumann, Brahms, etc.

- Love Songs (Hermann Prey) (Denon)

Schubert, Schumann, Brahms

- Songs (Grace Bumbry) (EMI Classics)

Schubert, Schumann

- Songs, Dichterliebe (Hermann Prey) (Philips)

Schumann

- Dichterliebe; Liederkreis, Op. 24 (Hermann Prey) (Denon)
- Liederkreis, Op. 39; Kerner-Lieder (Hermann Prey) (Denon)
- Songs (Hermann Prey) (Philips)

Silcher

- Songs (Hermann Prey) (Deutsche Grammophon)

Strauss, Debussy

- Songs (Roberta Peters) (MPS)

Weber

- Songs (Hermann Prey) (EMI Classics)

Wolf

- Songs (Hermann Prey) (Philips)
- Die liebe Seligkeit – Folksongs (Hermann Prey) (Deutsche Grammophon)
- Baroque Songs and Arias (Hermann Prey, Eduard Melkus) (Philips)
- Viennese Songs from Schubert's Time (Hermann Prey) (Deutsche Grammophon)
