= Piano Concerto (Burgmüller) =

Concerto for piano and orchestra

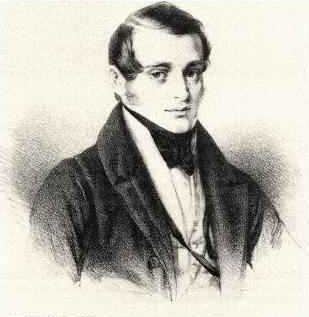
Norbert Burgmüller, Lithography by Jakob Becker

The Piano Concerto Op. 1 in F♯ minor is a concerto for piano and orchestra written by Norbert Burgmüller in 1828–29. It premiered on 14 January 1830 and was performed by Burgmüller at the piano.

Because of the early accidental death of Burgmüller at the age of 26 – he drowned in a spa in Aachen most likely due to an epileptic seizure – it is his only piano concerto.

== Background ==
The premiere was on 14 January 1830 in Kassel with Burgmüller at the piano. In 1833 Burgmüller became friends with Felix Mendelssohn, who performed the solo part in Düsseldorf on 3 May 1834.

== Composition ==
The orchestra includes 2 flutes, 2 oboes, 2 clarinets, 2 bassoons, 2 horns, 2 trumpets, 3 trombones, kettledrums and strings. It is written in three-movement concerto form:

1. Allegro ma non troppo
2. Larghetto con moto
3. Allegro moderato

== Recordings ==
- 1998 – Leonard Hokanson on piano, conductor Gernot Schmalfuss – Concerto For Piano And Orchestra Op. 1 F Sharp Minor / Overture For Orchestra Op. 5 / Symphony No.2 Op. 11 D Major
- 2000 – Nikolaus Lahusen on piano, conductor Heribert Beissel – Norbert Burgmüller: Klavierkonzert (op. 1) / Robert Schumann: Konzertstücke für Klavier und Orchester (op. 92 + 134).
- 2012 – Tobias Koch on piano, conductor Frieder Bernius – Norbert Burgmüller: Klavierkonzert op. 1 / Entr'actes op. 17 / Ouverture op. 5
