= Johanna Martzy =

Hungarian violinist (1924–1979)

Background information
- Born: 26 October 1924; Timișoara, Romania
- Died: 13 August 1979 (aged 54) Glarus, Switzerland
- Genres: Classical
- Occupation: Violinist
- Instrument: Violin
- Years active: 1937–1950s
- Spouse: Béla de Csillery

Johanna Martzy (26 October 1924 – 13 August 1979) was a Hungarian violinist, born in Romania.

She was born in Timișoara, Banat, Romania in 1924 and debuted at 13. She toured in the 1940s up to the late 1960es. In the late 1950s, her renown in North America, at least, declined while she toured in South America, Australia, England, The Netherlands, Switzerland and South Africa, and offered many concerts and Radio recordings. Her death from cancer, in Glarus in 1979, was not well noted.

Among her chamber music recordings those of Schubert have been thought particularly special (Recorder by Columbia). She however was best known for her interpretation of the Unaccompanied Bach Violin Sonates, which were published by Colombia. She performed amongst others with the conductor Leonard Bernstein in New York. She recorded LPs with Ferenc Fricsay (Dvorak Violin Concerto, Deutsche Grammophon Gesellschaft), Eugen Jochum (Mozart and Bach violin Concertos, Coup d'Archet and Heliodor) Paul Kletzki (Mendelssohn and Brahms Violin Concertos, and Beethoven Romances G and F Major, recorded by Colombia).

She married conductor Béla de Csillery, with whom she left Hungary during World War II in 1944, but the marriage was dissolved after ten years. In 1960, she married the Swiss book and newspaper editor Daniel Tschudi, also a violin collector, and one daughter was born into the marriage. While she initially continued her international solo career for several years, she gradually decreased her concert tours, and by the 1970s stopped performing internationally. In 2024, her first and only stereo LP was published in Switzerland (by Jürg Schoppe) in celebration of her hundredth anniversary, and in October 2024, a memorial was held in her honor in Budapest and Timișoara, Romania, organized by Agnes Ligetinè Beke, first violin of The Budapest Orchestra.

She was referred to by Glenn Gould in his essay "We who are about to be disqualified salute you," as "an artist who has always seemed to me to be, at least in North America, the most underrated of the great violinists of our age."
