= Karl-Heinz Schlüter =

German pianist

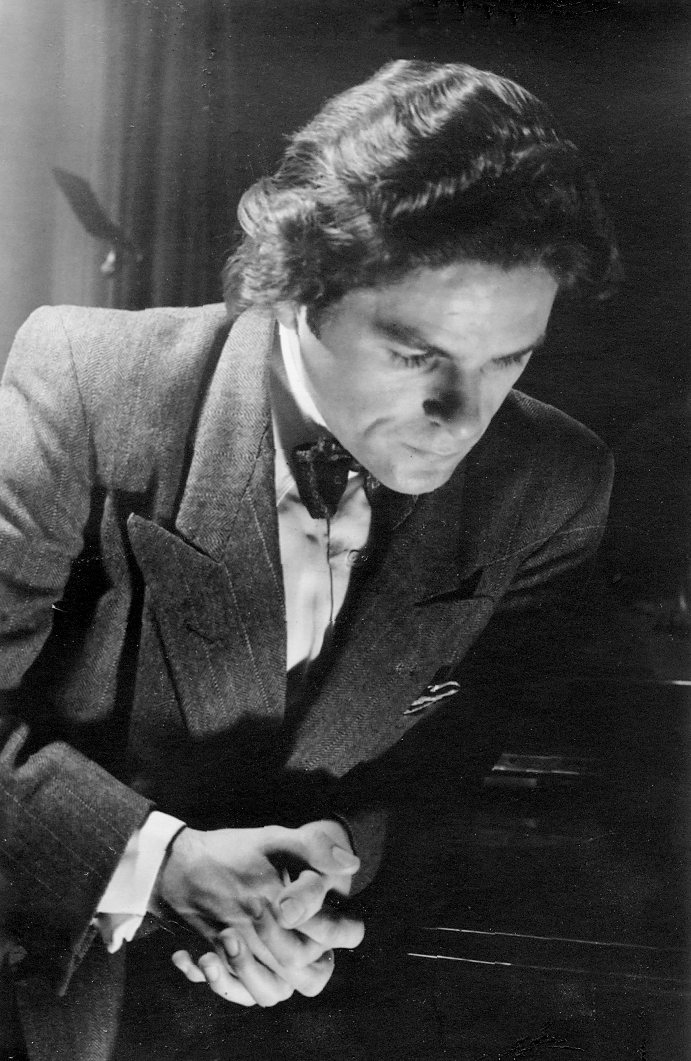
- Born: 5 March 1920; Torgau, Germany
- Died: 20 December 1995 (aged 75); Würzburg, Bavaria, Germany
- Education: Musikhochschule Berlin
- Occupation: Classical pianist
- Organizations: Hochschule für Musik Nürnberg; University of Würzburg

Karl-Heinz Schlüter (5 March 1920 – 20 December 1995) was a German classical pianist.

== Life ==
Born in Torgau, Schlüter studied from 1931-1937 in Hannover with Rudolf Krasselt and Clara Spitta, then at the Musikhochschule Berlin with Carl Adolf Martienssen until 1940. He passed his concert examination with distinction. In the Berlin press, he was regarded as a "thoroughly accomplished pianist of the greatest style" when playing Beethoven's Piano Concerto No. 4 at age 20.

Seven years later, after service as a soldier and held prisoner of war until 1947, he trained his skills in Walter Gieseking's master class and became a lecturer at the Hochschule für Musik Detmold. In 1949, he received the Chopin Prize Berlin/Warsaw, in 1950 the Ferruccio Busoni International Piano Competition in Bolzano. He played with conductors such as Robert Heger (NDR Elbphilharmonie Orchestra), Hermann Abendroth (MDR Leipzig Radio Symphony Orchestra), Fritz Lehmann (Bamberg Symphony), Ernest Bour (SWF Orchestra), Wilhelm Schüchter Nordwestdeutsche Philharmonie, Werner Andreas Albert (Munich Philharmonic), in Germany and abroad.

He taught at the Braunschweig Music School, the Osnabrück Conservatory, the Hochschule für Musik Nürnberg and finally the University of Würzburg (from 1985 to 1988). He was a jury member at national competitions such as Jugend musiziert and international competitions such as the International Chopin Piano Competition.

He performed with his son Michael as a piano duo. In 1967, WDR offered a date for a live broadcast in the series "Artists in North Rhine-Westphalia" was available at short notice. Father and son played Mozart's Sonata for Two Pianos in D major, Variations on a Theme by Haydn by Brahms, Chopin's Rondo in C major and Debussy's En blanc et noir. The Schlüter Duo performed during the following years until 1995 in Germany and abroad (including Europe, Middle East), both classical-romantic repertoire and contemporary music. The duo made several recordings, including the complete works for two pianos by Schubert, Reger and Hindemith. The duo was a regular guest at European radio stations in Switzerland, Austria and Germany. They played contemporary music such as by Jean Françaix, Ernst-Lothar von Knorr, Rudolf Kelterborn and Martin Christoph Redel. From 1982 to 1992, they conducted an annual master class for piano duo at the Würzburg Musikhochschule.

With Josef Trumm (violoncello) and Cyrill Kopatschka (violin), he performed as part of the Chopin Trio. With Marcel Charpentier (violin) and Eckard Stahl (violoncello), he founded the Osnabrück Piano Trio. Together with Ludwig Müller-Gronau (violin), Wilhelm Isselmann (viola), and Werner Thomas-Mifune (violoncello), he formed the West German Piano Quartet.

The pianists Magdalena Galka and Ann-Helena Schlüter and the violinist Johanna Schlüter are his daughters.

Schlüter died in Würzburg aged 75.
