= Johan Schlüter =

Danish lawyer

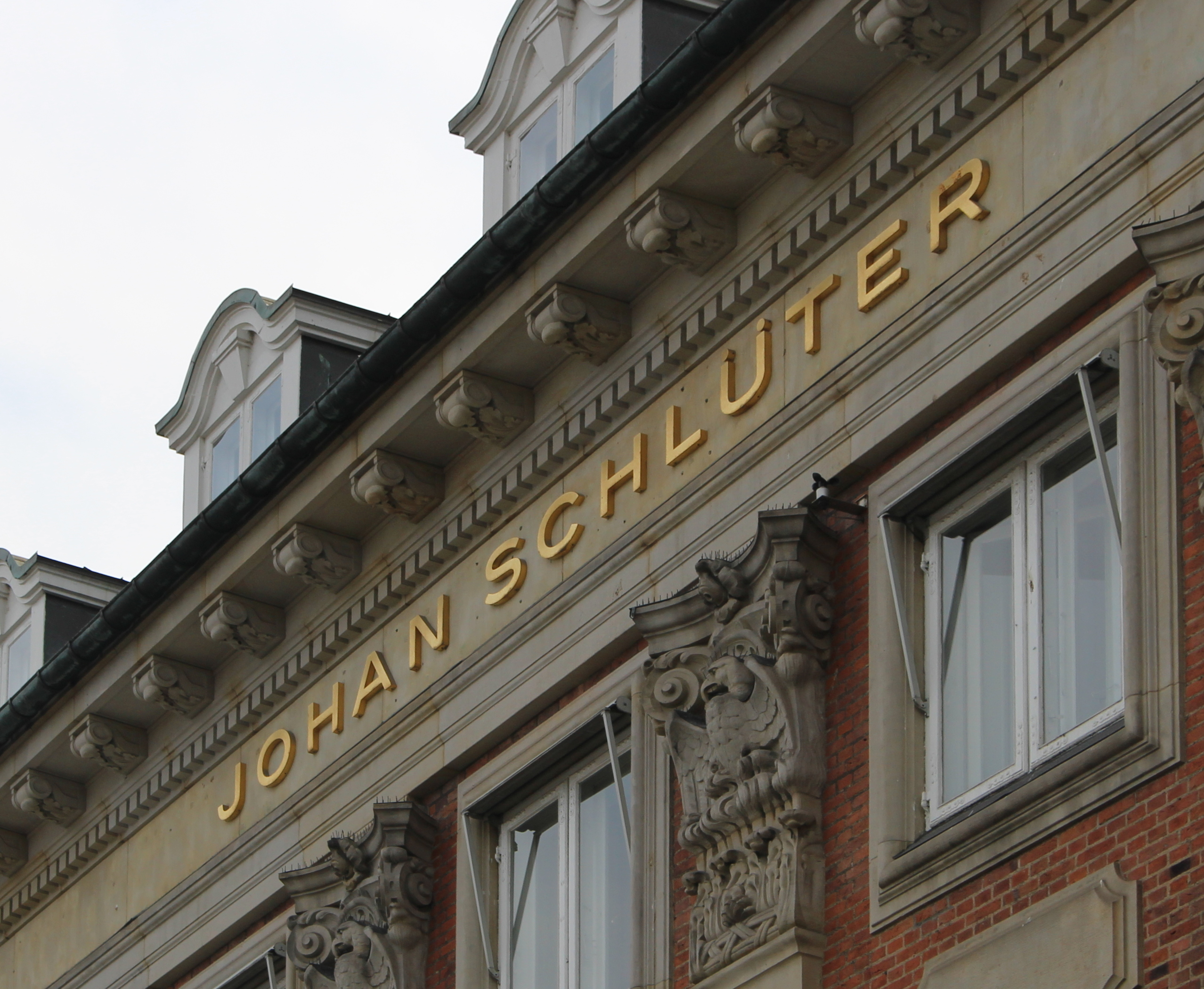
Facade of Johan Schlüter law firm

Johan Schlüter (born 18 June 1944) is a former Danish lawyer who worked with copyright.

== Education ==
Schlüter was educated as a Candidate of Law at the University of Copenhagen in 1970.

== Career ==
He was a partner in Berning Schlüter Hald (1990–1998), Schlüter & Hald (1998–1999) and Bech-Bruun Dragsted (1999–2002), until he established his own law firm in 2002, Johan Schlüter Law Firm, which closed in 2015, and was based at Højbro Square.

In the 1970s, he became involved as a lawyer for the Danish gramophone record industry, (IFPI Danmark) via Bent Fabricius Bjerre, and gradually gained a central position as an advisor to Danish rights holders to such an extent that he has been termed "the king of Danish copyright". Among Schlüter's work was the establishment of the Antipiratgruppen (lit. 'the Anti-Pirate Group') and the later association RettighedsAlliancen. One of the cases that Schlüter had for the Antipirate group came in 2011 to a principled Supreme Court judgment on proof-securing.

With Thomas Sehested, Johan Schlüter was also behind the software company DtecNet, which was originally established in 2004 under the name JSA Software. In 2010, the company was sold to the American company MarkMonitor. In 2010, DtecNet became a Gazelle winner, an award issued by the magazine Dagbladet Børsen.

In 2012, Schlüter became involved in a French case concerning the administration of the legacy of the French singer Charles Trenet. The French authorities issued an international arrest warrant for Schlüter. In 2014, a French court sentenced him to 18 months of unconditional imprisonment in the case, and subsequently Frenchman Georges El Assidi made a claim of 30 million krone against Schlüter, first in Copenhagen and later at the Eastern High Court. In the case, the Østre Landsret decided that El Assidi could freeze Schlüter's assets until the case was finalized in France. The French case was appealed, and ended with an acquittal of Schlüter in the main proceedings.

In the summer of 2015, Schlüter's law firm was reported to the police by the Producerforeningen, which believed that it was owed at least DKK 100 million. This was done by an independent audit examination which revealed serious irregularities in the administration of the companies CAB, Filmret and Filmkopi. The companies were administered by Schlüter and his law firm through the associated company Registrering Danmark ApS. In connection with the case, the law firm, which was reported to the police, dismissed its partner Susanne Fryland and dismissed a third of the employees. On 2 October 2015 finans.dk reported that the law firm was closed and the headquarters vacated, and a few days later, the Maritime and Commercial Court declared the company bankrupt. Schlüter himself was declared bankrupt in December 2015. In February 2016, Schlüter and his third partner, Lars Halgreen, were also charged in the case. In June 2017, the Public Prosecutor for Special Economic Crime brought charges against Schlüter and two other lawyers in Schlüter's law firm. The case was then over 200 million krone and the charges included, among other things, fraudulent conveyance and mandate fraud of a particularly serious nature. On 11 June 2018 Schlüter was found guilty at the Copenhagen City Court of gross mandate fraud and fraudulent conveyance and sentenced to four years' imprisonment. The penalty was made conditional on the age of the person sentenced and "personal relationship". In addition, his right to run a law firm was taken away. Schlüter received the Koktvedgaard Prize in 2012.

== Personal life ==
Schlüter is married to Elsebeth and has four children. He has lived in an apartment on the Esplanade and has a summer house in Lumsås.
