= Jean Hellot =

French chemist (1685–1766)

Jean Hellot (20 November 1685 – 13 February 1766) was a French chemist who contributed to early studies on phosphorus and worked on applied aspects in dyeing, metallurgy, mining, and porcelain manufacture.

Hellot was born in Paris to Michel and Marie-Anne Reynaud, and was taught at home and expected to follow a career in the clergy. A book on chemistry belonging to his grandfather made him interested in science and this was furthered by Etienne-Francois Geoffroy (1672-1731) who was married later married a niece of Hellot. Hellot also met Hans Sloane and Daniel Newton on trips to England. He became director of the newspaper Gazette de France from 1718 to 1738 and through journalism, became a friend of many French scientists. His first chemistry research was published in 1735 and in 1736 he became an assistant chemist at the Academie Royale des Sciences, succeeding Charles Marie de la Condamine (1701-1774). He rose to the position of chief chemist in 1743 after the death of Louis Lemery.

Hellot edited the French translation (1750–1753) of Christoph Andreas Schlüter's metallurgical treatise Gründlicher Unterricht von Hütte-Werken, issued as De la fonte des mines, des fonderies, &c.

Hellot's contributions to chemistry include studies on dyeing and mordants for wool. He also demonstrated that colors in precious minerals were due to gaseous additives at the time of formation. Hellot studied the formulation and assaying of metals and their alloys and techniques for refining metal. In 1763 he was part of committee to examine fire hazards in a coalmine in Briancon. Hellot also researched invisible inks, examined methods for extraction of phosphorus from urine, the production of ether, and the manufacture of porcelain.

Hellot married Denis, a distant relative at the age of 65 in 1750. He died of apoplexy and was buried at the Chapelle de la Communion, Greve.
