= Frank J. Schlueter =

American photographer

Frank J. Schlueter (c.1874 – 1972) was a documentary and commercial photographer in Southeast Texas.

== Career ==
Schlueter photographed the quickly growing Houston region in the first half of the twentieth century, retiring in 1964. Schlueter's work was used by early oil producers in the region to document and promote their work.
