= Torsten Schlüter =

German painter, performance artist and author

Torsten Schlüter (born 30 September 1959 in Hennigsdorf, East Germany) is a German painter, performance artist and author.

1981 -1986 training in architecture and completing his university degree at Bauhaus-Universität Weimar. Later in 1986 he turns away from architecture and concentrates on painting. Due to his “renouncement of the predetermined academic path” the authorities make him a persona-non-grata in Weimar. The island of Hiddensee in the baltic sea is increasingly becoming his refuge. 1986-1987 odd jobs as painter of signs, carpenter's assistant, stage scene painter and tennis trainer. Creation of set and costumes for the theatre. In 1987 he starts the yearly “Kunstgarten”, an outdoor gallery, on the island Hiddensee. From 1988 he works as a freelance artist. 1989 Political involvement with Neues Forum (New Forum). In the same year, after the Berlin Wall fell, he begins to travel and work on the road especially in Africa and India. 1990 He establishes his art studio in the Atelierhaus Weimar. 1994 move to a new art studio in the Kulturbrauerei, Berlin. 1995 design of the official logo of the Island Hiddensee. 1996 art studio Hackesche Höfe, Berlin. 1997 “Tulipamwe”, the North-South divide covering art work (Germany and France), initiated by Jack Lang. 2003 art studio in Berlin Mitte. 2004 He receives the "Süddeutscher Aquarellpreis" award. 2004 artist engagement for “Eisern Union” – “1. FC Union Berlin”, Goethe Institut Berlin. 2007 and 2010 “Hiddensee Edition”. 2008 project “Well women-High Priestesses of the Market”, Gerhart Hauptmann Haus, Hiddensee.

Various studies and work related visits to Andaman Islands, France, Greece, Guatemala, India, Indonesia, Morocco, Mexico, Namibia, New York, Sri Lanka. Torsten Schlüter lives in Berlin and Hiddensee.

art books

- Witches and practice witchcraft, 1992
- Hiddensee Notes, 1996
- Tulipamwe, 1997
- Mata Nataraya - Hippies, Hindus, cock fights“, 2000
- Northern lights” – Hiddensee; 2001
- Northern lights II - Hiddensee”, 2005
- Woman at the Well, 2008
- Northern lights III - Hiddensee, 2013
