= Lazarus Ercker =

Bohemian metallurgist and assay master

Lazarus Ercker (c. 1530 – 1594) was a Bohemian metallurgist and assay master of a mint near Prague, Bohemia who wrote some of the earliest known treatises on metallurgy entitled Beschreibung allerfürnemisten mineralischen Ertzt und Berckwercksarten (1574) and Münzbuch, wie es mit den Münzen gehalten sind (1563).

== Life ==
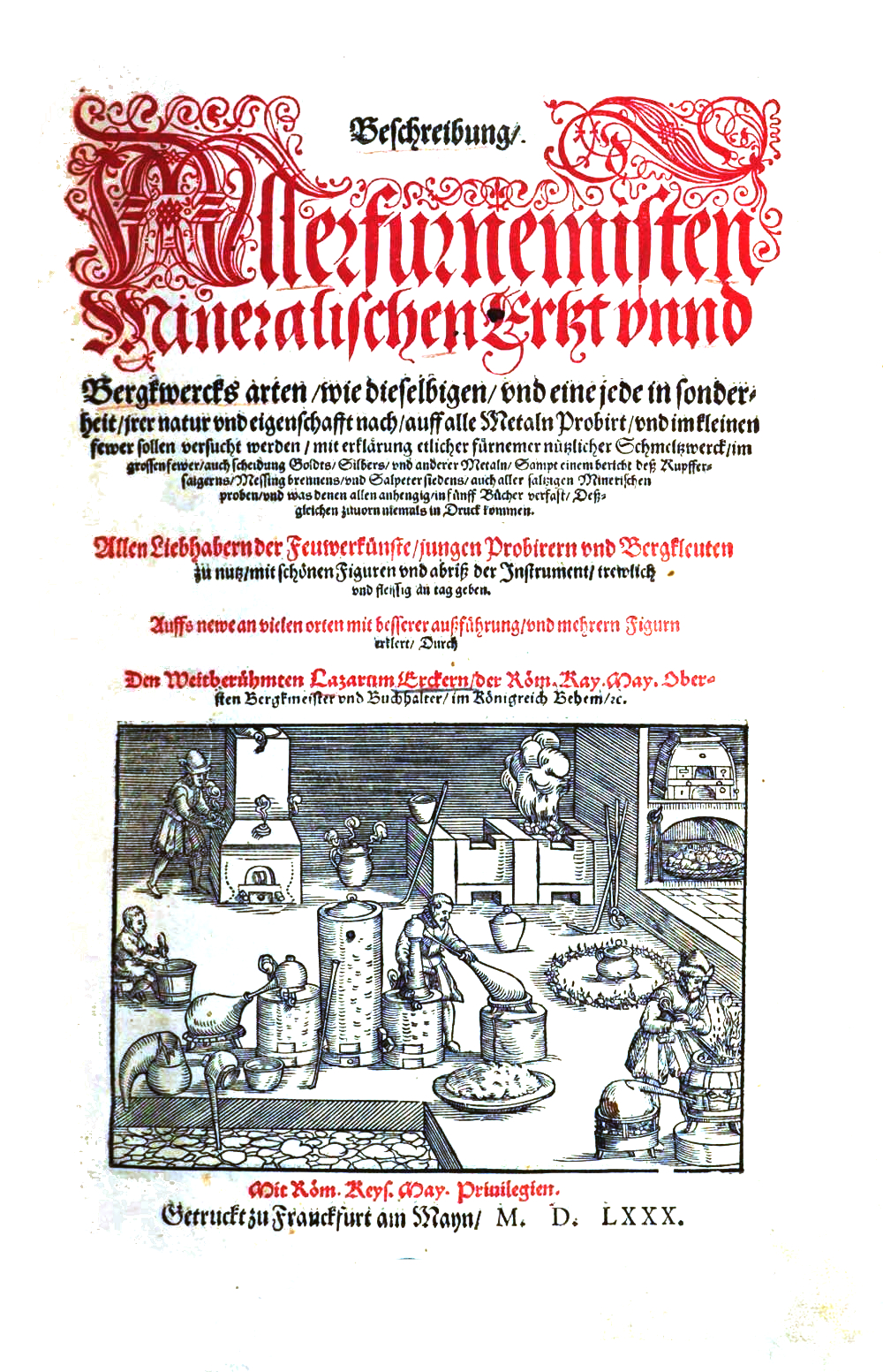
Title page of the 1580 edition of Ercker's book

Ercker was born at St. Annenberg (Annaberg, Saxony) around 1530 and studied at the University of Wittenberg between 1547 and 1548. Around 1554 he became an assayer at Dresden through the patronage of Elector Augustus with the influence of Johann Neese (a relative of his wife). In 1558 he became master of the mint at Goslar for Prince Henry of Brunswick. In 1567 his wife died and he tried to return to Dresden. His brother-in-law Caspar Richter helped him get a job as a tester at Kutna Hora near Prague. His 1574 book Beschreibung allerfürnemisten mineralischen Ertzt und Berckwercksarten described the production of alloys and refining of several metals including silver, gold, copper, antimony, bismuth, tin, lead and mercury. It was in Ercker's book that the word "wolfram" is first used for a mineral found in Saxony which Ercker thought contained tin and the metal only much later identified as the element tungsten. The book went through several editions and led to his appointment as courier for mining affairs under Emperor Maximilian II. Under Rudolf II he became master of the mint in Prague and was knighted (and known as Lazarus Ercker von Schreckenfels) on 10 March 1586. The eighth edition of his book published in 1672 was retitled Aula subterranea alias Probierbuch. Ercker's 1574 book was translated into English by Sir John Pettus as Fleta Minor in 1683 with the original woodcuts redrawn with some modifications. His book was also plagiarized by Georg Engelhardt von Löhneyss in his Bericht vom Bergwerck (1617).
