= Albert Schluter =

German Born Australian Activist

Albert Christian Schlüter OAM (15 November 1923 - 27 March 2007) was a German-born Australian activist for immigrant rights in Australia.

Schlüter was born in Hamburg, Germany, the oldest of 3 children. His father, Heinrich Schlüter, was a German army officer who was killed during World War II at the age of 41. His wife, Margarethe was left to raise 3 children, Albert, Heinz and Monja.

Schlüter followed in his father's footsteps and enlisted in the German Army at the beginning of WW2 and rose to the rank of lieutenant. He was twice decorated with the Iron Cross and luckily survived after a bullet wound to the arm allowed a timely exit from the Eastern Front.

He immigrated to Australia in 1951 to live with his uncle and aunt in Sydney. Some years later he travelled to Tasmania on a holiday and soon took up residence and married Kathleen Round (4 January 1933 - 12 September 2021) on Anzac Day, 1957. He fathered four children, Paul (1958-2024), Christine, Andrew and Simon. He worked in a range of jobs including dry cleaning, geriatric nursing, a clerk at BP and lastly as a self-employed printer.

Growing up in Nazi Germany during the reign of Adolf Hitler left an indelible impression. Schlüter was disheartened by the xenophobic treatment of foreigners by Australians. He saw racism and ignorance. Experiencing this in his new country was difficult and demoralizing. His vision of a culturally rich, more tolerant Australia by the integration of different cultures never left him.

He was an elder and founding member of the Lutheran Church of Tasmania.

In the 1960s he joined and was the driving force of the Good Neighbour Council of Tasmania. At one stage he was president, treasurer and secretary. He pushed for a culture of education and public celebration within cultural groups. He believed that migrants should stand up and be counted and celebrate their ethnic customs. Traditions began to change. Citizenship ceremonies were now public celebrations. On one occasion Schluter went out and bought trees that were given to each new Australian. A tradition that continues to this day.

In the 1960s he joined the Australian Labor Party and started the Springfield Branch of the ALP. Although standing as a Labor candidate in 1969 and 1972 he was unsuccessful but undeterred.

In the 1970s he organised fund raising activities for the Red Cross and Salvation Army. He introduced Hobart to German playwrights as president of the Hobart Repertory Theatre and presented German classical composers on the local community radio station 92.1FM.

In 1979 he was appointed to the Migrant Settlement Council for Tasmania.

In 1982 he was awarded the Order of Australia Medal "For service to the community and to migrant welfare." With funding reduced to the Good Neighbour Council his role moved to that of chair of the Multicultural Council of Tasmania in the 1990s that embodied numerous ethnic communities that had a stronger voice.

Schlüter was a mover and shaker within the Tasmanian community. Never one to be backward in coming forward he frequently cornered politicians as to their views and accountability on ethnic affairs. A favourite story relates to Albert putting his comments to poetry at otherwise boring conferences. He was a favourite with the media for his frank opinions. He was a frequent visitor to Canberra and regularly sought out for his advice on multicultural matters. Albert was an active member of the Federated Ethnic Communities Council of Australia. Soon after he turned 80 FECCA had been left without staff in Canberra so he left his home state of Tasmania and went and staffed it by himself.

He was outspoken on the policies of Pauline Hanson's One Nation Party and likened their racist policies to that of Nazi Germany. He was not popular with her supporters.

He died in Hobart in 2007.

Con Pagonis, past Director of Immigration in Hobart established the biannual Albert Schlüter Scholarship in 2020 awarded to outstanding young leaders allowing them to attend and present at the Federated Ethnic Community Council conferences.
