= Ann-Helena Schlüter =

German pianist

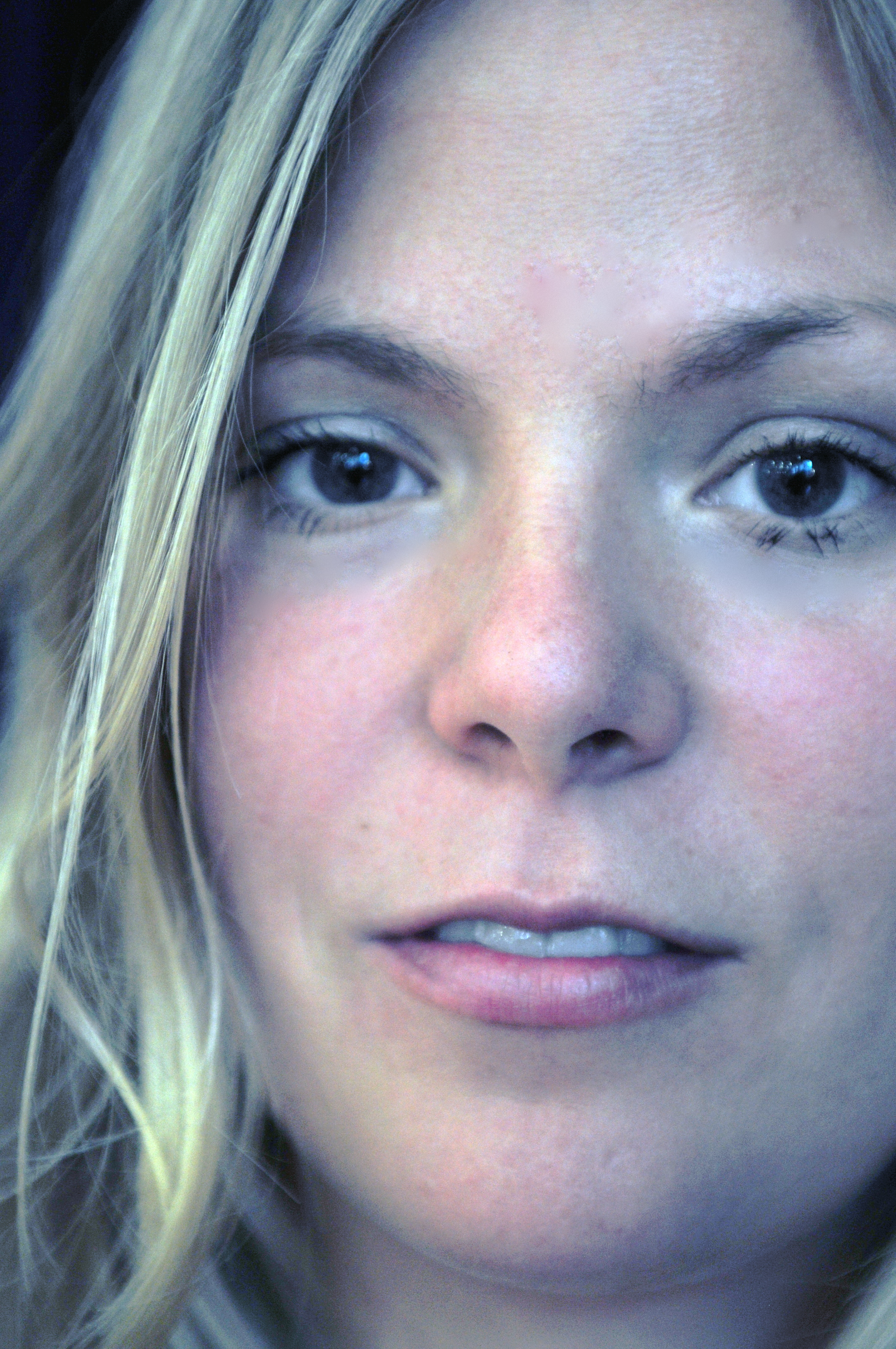
Schlüter in 2009

Ann-Helena Schlüter (born 14 February 1976 (Note: Schlüter's birthday is 14 February. She was 14 years old on 19 August 1990. Her full birthdate, 14 February 1976, is calculated from these two facts.)) is a German pianist, organist, composer and poet.

== Early life and career ==
Schlüter was born in Nuremberg and began her piano lessons at the age of three with her mother, the Swedish piano teacher and organist Ann-Margret Schlüter, née Elmgren, who comes from Småland, southern Sweden. From the age of seven, she continued her studies with her father, the German pianist Karl-Heinz Schlüter. Schlüter grew up in Würzburg. At the age of five she won her first youth musician piano competition, at eight she played her first piano recital, at ten she performed a Mozart piano concerto for the first time at the Nürnberg Opera House.

In addition to attending the music high schools in Nuremberg and Würzburg, Schlüter became a junior student at the Hochschule für Musik Würzburg with the Swedish pianist Arne Torger. She won the international Steinway Piano Competition Hamburg, the Nuremberg Piano Competition, was several times first prize winner of the national competition Jugend musiziert in piano solo, piano duo and repetition, prize winner of the Robert Schumann Competition Zwickau and 1st prize at the Concerto Competition in London of the Masterworks Festival USA with Schumann's Piano Concerto.

After she gained her Abitur from high school, she studied piano at the Hochschule für Musik und Tanz Köln with Nina Tichman and completed her instrumental pedagogical diploma there. After the soloist class piano at the Hochschule für Musik Detmold with Anatol Ugorski, she successfully completed her artistic diploma and concert exam/master class diploma piano with Bernd Glemser at the Hochschule für Musik Würzburg. This was followed by a master's degree at the Arizona State University in Phoenix, United States, with Walter Cosand and Eckart Sellheim as German Academic Exchange Service scholarship holder. During her studies she worked as a lecturer and assistant lecturer for repetition, chamber music and song accompaniment. During a stay abroad in Perth, Australia, she completed a concert tour through the country.

Schlüter also writes poetry, prose, novels, articles and songs. Among other things, she won 1st prize at the 11th Villach Literature Competition in Austria. In 2018 she published the novel Frei wie die Vögel, in which she underlays real events – the murder of four clergymen in the "Third Reich", the Lübeck martyrs – with a fictional suggestive framing.

After completing her concert exam in piano, she continued her studies in Frankfurt and Würzburg with Christoph Bossert and at the Hochschule für Musik und Theater Hamburg with Pieter van Dijk. Following a master's degree in organ performance, Schlüter earned a diploma in church music from the University of Greifswald in 2023 , which is equivalent to the standard B-level church music examination.

In autumn 2023, she worked for two months as a church musician in the Catholic parishes of Brühl and Wesseling, as well as St. Konrad in Plochingen. In 2024 and 2025, she worked for several months in the Catholic parish of St. Mariä Himmelfahrt in Wittichenau, Saxony, according to her own account. In January 2026, she took up a position as a part-time church musician in the St. Anthony Parish, Diepoldsau, in the Diocese of Saint Gallen, Switzerland.

== Personal life ==
Schlüter, originally baptized as Lutheran, converted to the Catholic Church in 2023.

== Publications ==
- Lebensheiterkeit: Hommage an Joseph Haydn, CD, Cap-Music, 2009.
- Jeden Augenblick, CD, cap-music, 2010.
- PianoLyrik (with Goldberg-Variationen), CD, cap-music, 2011.
- Himlasång (Himmelslieder), Doppel-CD, cap-music, 2012.
- Com'Ann, CD, cap-music, 2013.
- Pianolyrik opus 1, Flügelworte, 180 Gedichte über Musik. Lorbeer-Verlag, Bielefeld 2013.
- Bach – Die Kunst der Fuge (The Art of Fugue). The Leipzig Concert. Double-CD. Periplaneta, 2014.
- Pianolyrik opus 2, Flügelworte, 220 Gedichte. Periplaneta Verlag, Berlin 2015.
- Pianolyrik Bd. 1 und 2, Notes. Waldkauz-Verlag (Hörle Musikhaus), Remscheid 2015.
- Flügel auf Reisen. Die auf den Tasten tanzt. Fontis-Verlag, Basel 2016.
- Bach: Wohltemperiertes Klavier, Steinway D in Leipzig and Schwerin, Doppel-CD. Hänssler Classic, 2017
- Frei wie die Vögel. Eine Erzählung gegen das Vergessen. SCM Verlag, 2018.
- Keine Wolke fällt tiefer als blau, Lyrikband opus 3. Glaré-Verlag, Frankfurt, 2019.
- Das Demutsprinzip in Bachs Musik. Kopaed-Verlag, München 2019.
- Stille och Snö. Neue schwedisch-deutsche Orgelmusik. Heinrichshofen & Noetzel, 2019.
- Bach Fantasias & Duets. Hänssler Classic, 2019
