= Florian Prey =

German opera singer

- Born: 1959 (age 66–67); Hamburg, Germany
- Genres: Opera
- Occupation: Opera singer

Florian Prey (born 1959 in Hamburg) is a German opera singer (lyric baritone). He is the son of German baritone Hermann Prey.

== Bibliography ==
- in Erika von Borries (2007). Wilhelm Müller - Der Dichter der Winterreise - Eine Biographie. München: C.H. Beck Verlag. p. 317. ISBN 978-3-406-56212-9., with two CDs, CD 1: Gert Westphal liest Die Winterreise und Die schöne Müllerin. CD 2: Neueinspielung der Winterreise (Schubert) by Florian Prey (baritone) and Wolfgang Leibnitz (piano).
