= Friedrich Gulda =

Austrian pianist and composer (1930–2000)

- .Friedrich Gulda, c. 1990
- Born: 16 May 1930; Vienna, Austria
- Died: 27 January 2000 (aged 69); Steinbach am Attersee, Austria
- Education: Wiener Volkskonservatorium; Vienna Music Academy
- Occupations: Pianist; Composer
- Awards: Austrian Cross of Honour for Science and Art

Friedrich Gulda (German: [ˌfʁiːdʁɪç ˈɡʊlda] 16 May 1930 – 27 January 2000) was an Austrian pianist and composer who worked in both the classical and jazz fields.

== Biography ==
=== Early life and career ===
Born in Vienna the son of a teacher, Gulda began learning to play the piano at age 7 with Felix Pazofsky at the Wiener Volkskonservatorium. In 1942, he entered the Vienna Music Academy, where he studied piano and musical theory under Bruno Seidlhofer and Joseph Marx.

During World War II as teenagers, Gulda and his friend Joe Zawinul would perform forbidden music, including jazz, in violation of the government's prohibition of playing of such music.

Gulda won first prize at the Geneva International Music Competition in 1946. Initially, the jury preferred the Belgian pianist Lode Backx, but when the final vote was taken, Gulda was the winner. One of the jurors, Eileen Joyce, who favoured Backx, stormed out and claimed the other jurors were unfairly influenced by Gulda's supporters. Gulda began to play concerts worldwide. He made his Carnegie Hall debut in 1950. Together with Jörg Demus and Paul Badura-Skoda, Gulda formed what became known as the "Viennese troika".

=== Career as classical pianist ===
Although most renowned for his Mozart and Beethoven interpretations, Gulda also performed the music of J. S. Bach (often on clavichord), Schubert, Chopin, Schumann, Debussy and Ravel. His recordings of Bach's The Well-Tempered Clavier are well regarded, but Gulda performed very few other pieces by Bach and recorded even fewer. In the late 1960s Gulda recorded the complete Beethoven sonatas. He continued to perform classical works throughout his life, composing cadenzas for two Mozart concertos, which he famously recorded with his former pupil Claudio Abbado, although he sometimes conducted from the keyboard himself. A notable feature of his Mozart recordings were his own improvisations.

Phillips Records included Gulda in its Great Pianists of the 20th Century CD box set, which came out in 1999. His piano students included Martha Argerich, who called him "my most important influence," and the conductor Claudio Abbado.

=== Jazz, free music and composition ===
In 1956, Gulda performed and recorded at Birdland in New York City and at the Newport Jazz Festival. He organized the International Competition for Modern Jazz in 1966, and he established the International Musikforum, a school for students who wanted to learn improvisation, in Ossiach, Austria, in 1968. From the 1950s on Gulda cultivated a professional interest in jazz, writing songs and free improvisation or open music improvisations. He also recorded as a vocalist under the pseudonym "Albert Golowin", fooling music critics for years until it was realized that Gulda and Golowin were the same person. He played instrumental pieces, at times combining jazz, free music, and classical music in his concerts. He once said:

There can be no guarantee that I will become a great jazz musician, but at least I shall know that I am doing the right thing. I don't want to fall into the routine of the modern concert pianist's life, nor do I want to ride the cheap triumphs of the Baroque bandwagon.

In jazz, he found "the rhythmic drive, the risk, the absolute contrast to the pale, academic approach I had been taught." He also took up playing the baritone saxophone.

In addition, Gulda composed "Variations on The Doors' 'Light My Fire'" (aka 'Variationen über "Light My Fire" (von Jim Morrison)') for solo piano, and released it in 1971 on Track 11 (LP disc 1, side 2, track 1) of "The Long Road To Freedom (Ein musikalisches Selbstporträt in Form eines Lehrgangs)". An earlier instrumental rock-style piano/bass/drums trio version (sans any of the complex Gulda composed and improvised variations...) of 'Light My Fire' can also be found on Gulda's album As You Like It (1970), an album that also includes standards such as "'Round Midnight" and "What Is This Thing Called Love?", as well as Gulda's classic "Blues For H.G. (dedicated to Hans Georg Brunner-Schwer)."

From the late 1960s through the 1980s – while continuing his straight-ahead swing and bop-based jazz (often in European Jazz big bands, which he often organized yearly) performances and recordings, and his classical performances and recordings, he also performed and/or recorded (often using a custom electrically amplified clavichord, percussion instruments, and a bass recorder wooden flute) with a wide range of musicians involved in Free improvisation, including: Cecil Taylor, Barre Phillips, Ursula Anders, John Surman, Albert Mangelsdorff, Stu Martin, and Fritz Pauer. Gulda spoke of a fascination with the boundaries in music, believing all music to have worth, regardless of how society judged it. He believed experiments in what he called 'free music' were wonderful musical experiences, even if nobody else believed it was music. One such experiment was a performance in which he and Ursula Anders would both improvise whilst nude and shouting about being mad.

In 1980, he wrote his Concerto for Cello and Wind Orchestra, which has been called "as moving as it is lighthearted", in five movements "involving jazz, a minuet, rock, a smidgen of polka, a march and a cadenza with two spots where a star cellist must improvise." He composed a piano concerto with jazz features, Concerto for Myself, that he premiered in Munich in 1988.

In 1982, Gulda teamed up with jazz pianist Chick Corea, who was between the breakup of Return to Forever and the formation of his Elektric Band. Issued on The Meeting (Philips, 1984), Gulda and Corea communicate in lengthy improvisations mixing jazz ("Some Day My Prince Will Come" and the lesser known, adapted by Miles Davis song "Put Your Foot Out") and classical music (Brahms' "Wiegenlied" ["Cradle song"]).

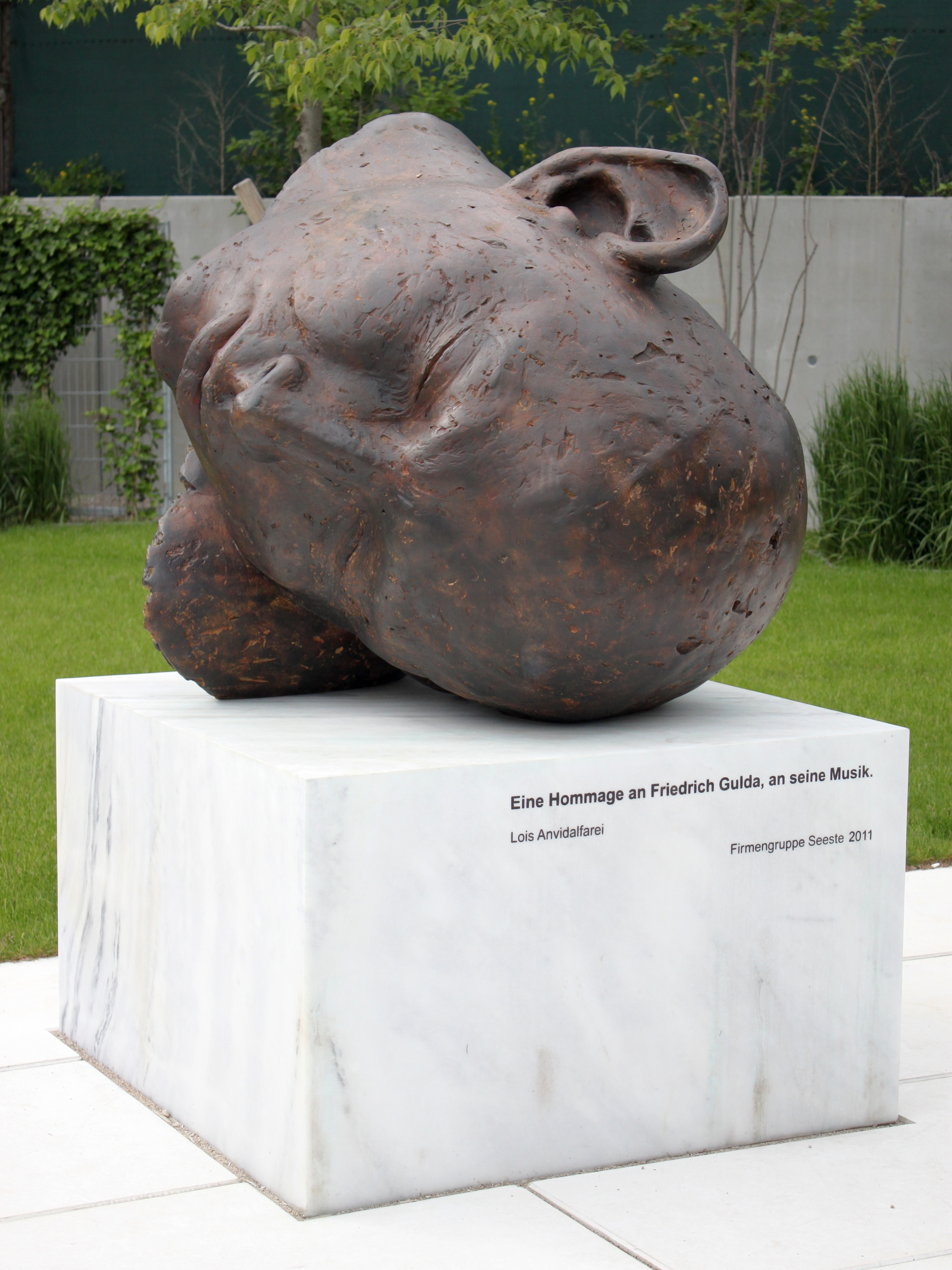
Friedrich Gulda Monument in Vienna, Austria titled The Lying Head with the Giant Ear at Guldapark (2011) by sculptor Lois Anvidalfarei

Gulda and Corea continued their musical relationship and recorded Mozart's Double Piano Concerto with the Concertgebouw Orchestra with Nikolaus Harnoncourt (conductor). They also played jazz piano duets of Gulda's "Fantasy For Two Pianos" and Corea's "Ping Pong For Two Pianos".

In the late 1980s and 1990s, organist/MIDI keyboardist Barbara Dennerlein also studied with and performed with Gulda.

These unorthodox practices along with refusing to follow clothing conventions (he was notoriously described as resembling, in one South German concert, "a Serbian pimp") or announce the program of his concerts in advance, earned him the nickname "terrorist pianist". In 1988, he cancelled a performance after officials of the Salzburg Festival objected to his including jazz musician Joe Zawinul on the program. When the Vienna Music Academy awarded him its Beethoven Ring in recognition of his performances, he accepted it but then later reconsidered and returned it. To promote a concert in 1999, he announced his own death in a press release so that the concert at the Vienna Konzerthaus could serve as a resurrection party.

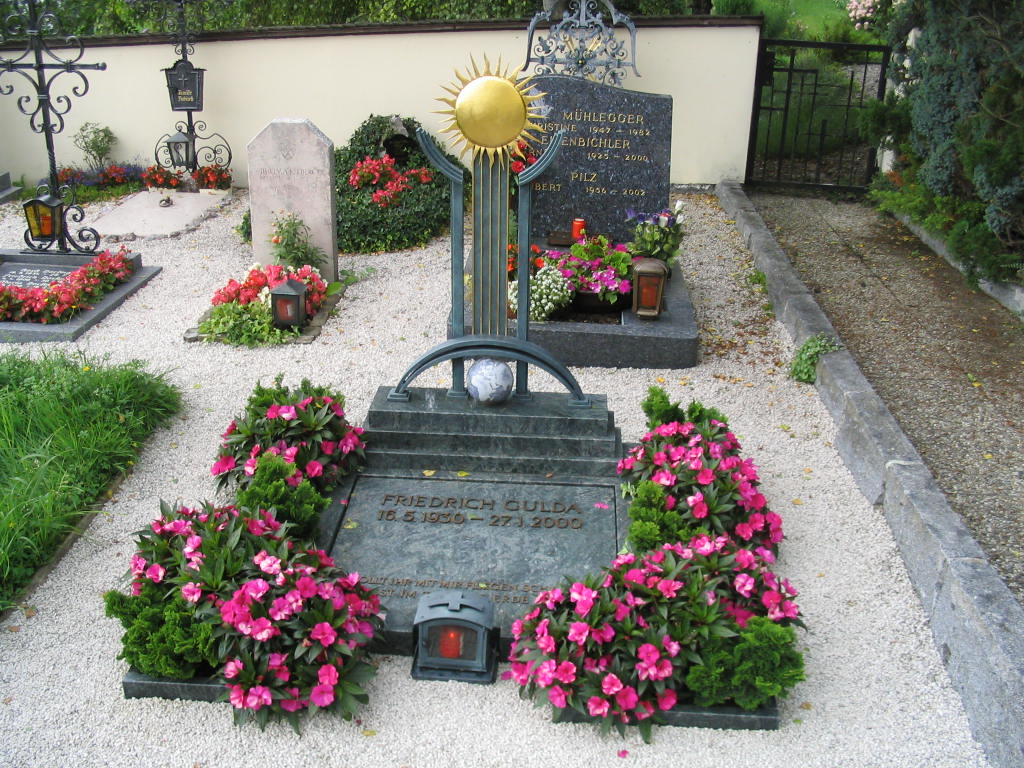
Friedrich Gulda's grave in Steinbach am Attersee

== Personal life ==
Gulda was married twice, first to actress Paola Loew (1956–1966) with whom he had two sons, David Wolfgang and Paul, and later to Yuko Wakiyama (1967–1973) with whom he had another son, Rico. Both Paul and Rico became accomplished pianists. In 1975 Gulda began a relationship with the oratorio singer Ursula Anders which lasted until his death.

Gulda died of heart failure at the age of 69 at his home in Weissenbach on January 27th, 2000. The date of Gulda's death was also the birthday of Mozart, the composer he most admired, and he had previously expressed his desire to die on this date. He is buried in the cemetery of Steinbach am Attersee. He gave instructions for there to be no obituary.

== Media ==
In 2007 a documentary film for television was made about his life, So what?! – Friedrich Gulda.

== Decorations and awards ==
- 1959: Austrian Cross of Honour for Science and Art
- 1989: Honorary Ring of Vienna

== See also ==
- List of Austrians in music
