= Lead mining in Scotland =

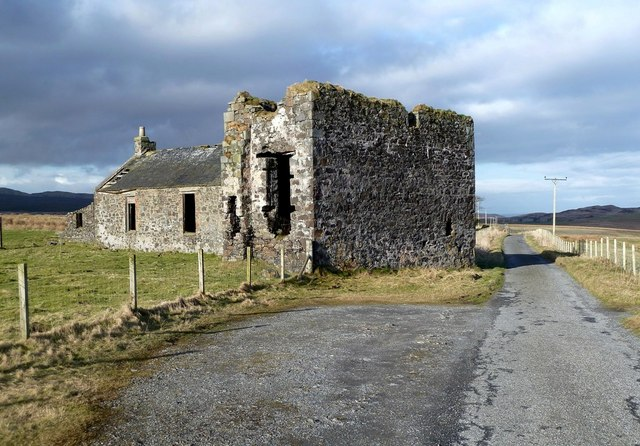
Abandoned lead mine buildings at Mulreesh on Islay.

Lead ore has been mined and refined in Scotland for centuries, primarily in the form of galena. It was a versatile material used for roofing material high-status buildings, fabricating the pipework of Linlithgow Palace fountain, glazing windows, and producing alloys such as pewter and latten. Lead was a valuable commodity, with rights reserved to the crown, and was exported abroad. Major centres of lead mining included Leadhills in South Lanarkshire and nearby, Wanlockhead in Dumfries and Galloway; Beinn Chùirn near Tyndrum; Strontian; Minnigaff near Newton Stewart; Woodhead at Carsphairn; and Islay. Abandoned workings include buddle pits which were used to separate heavy lead ores. Notable examples of Scotland's industrial heritage include the Wanlockhead beam engine.

== History of lead mining in Scotland ==
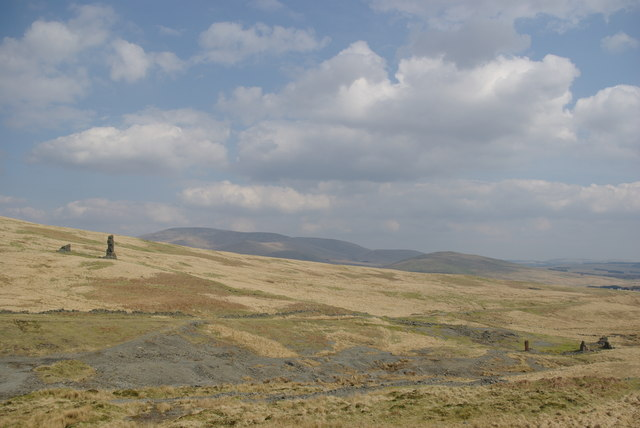
Site of abandoned 19th-century lead workings and settlement at Woodhead near Carsphairn.

Early references to mining are sparse. The earliest archival evidence relates to mining at Leadhills and Wanlockhead area at Glengonnar Water and at the "Frier Muir" in a 1239 charter of Newbattle Abbey. These and other mines are mentioned as landmarks in subsequent charters in Crawford or Crawfurdmure Parish at Crawfordjohn, and this Lanarkshire mining area, where lead, gold, and silver were found, was generally known as Crawfurdmure. Patrick, Abbot of Newbattle, defended the rights of his house to the lead from the area after Lord Hamilton obtained a substantial quantity of lead ore in 1466. Early references to Scottish silver may indicate metal obtained from lead ore. There is documentation of lead in use, and plumbers serving the royal court.

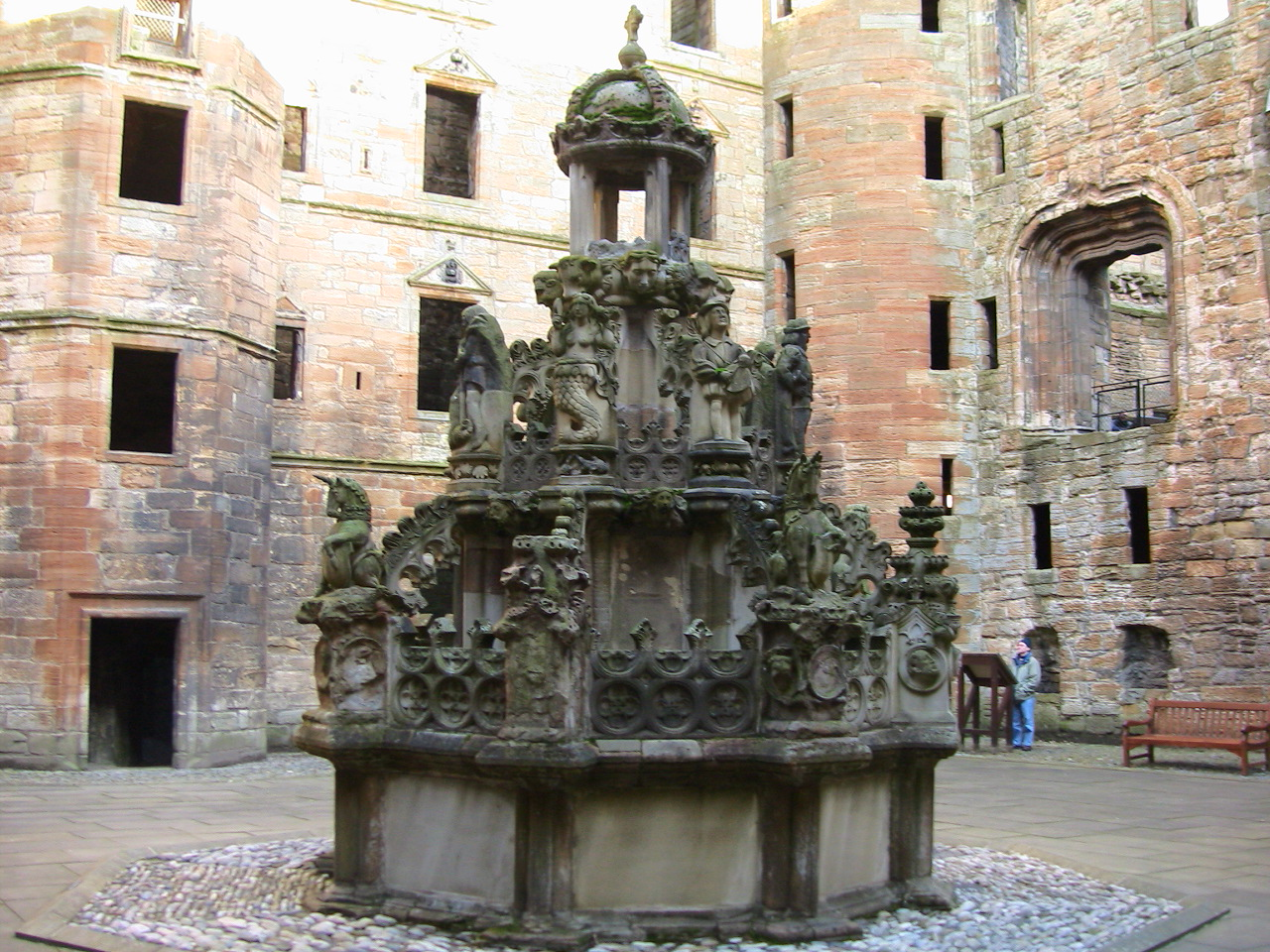
Lead pipes brought water to the fountain at Linlithgow Palace in 1538, and parts of the roof were covered with lead

=== James IV ===
James IV of Scotland encouraged lead mining. He employed a specialist, a "fineur" or refiner, Andrew Ireland, to process lead ore. He employed miners at Wanlockhead, directed by a priest "schir" James Pettigrew. William Striveling managed a mine on Islay. The lead from Islay was shipped to Dumbarton, and possibly refined there before it was carted to Edinburgh. At the end of February 1512, when James IV was at Newhaven trialling his new ship, the Great Michael, he gave 5 shillings as a reward or drinksilver to a man who brought some lead. Beyond the potential revenue and the use of lead in his projects, James IV was interesting in metallurgy for his gun founding, and in alchemy, through which he hoped to find a universal cure known as the "quinta essentia".

=== Robert Murray ===
Robert Murray was the Master Plumber to James V of Scotland. He worked on gutters and roofing and maintained the fountain at Linlithgow Palace in the summer of 1543 for Mary, Queen of Scots. The records do not specify where the lead he used came from (and much was recycled). Some of the lead used at Falkland Palace, where Robert Murray worked on another fountain, was shipped from Hull. On two occasions the supplies of lead earmarked for his work were stolen.

James V sent prospectors to look for gold in the lead mining areas, with some success. The barony of Crawfordjohn came into James's hands in 1536, and he licensed Ninian Crichton of Bellibocht (at Glencairn) to work lead mines at Crawfordmure or Sanquhar, a possible source of lead for the Linlithgow pipework. Crichton's charter allowed him to employ English miners. He was a courtier and associated with the affairs of Robert Crichton, Lord Sanquhar. John Carmichael of Meadowflat was Captain of Crawfordmure, and there was a residence at Crawfordjohn Castle, frequently visited by James V and at least once by his wife Mary of Guise.

== Lead and the Scottish crown ==
Lead extraction continued at Crawfurdmure, where a cleric "sir" Charles Forrest looked after two French refiners in 1553 during the rule of Regent Arran. These workers moved to "Mure Madzeane" where their expenses were paid by David Hamilton of Bothwellhaugh, father of James Hamilton the assassin.

Profits from gold mines and silver mines in Scotland were understood to belong to the crown, and a proportionate tax was levied. Lead was not used for coinage and had a different legal status, but according to the Discours Particulier D'Escosse of 1559, because silver was routinely extracted from the lead ore mining rights were also reserved to the crown.

=== John Misserve ===
John Misserve, was an English worker in the Scottish mint. He was also described as the "Inglis mynour", and was given a licence to prospect for gold and silver in June 1556. He would sell lead produced during refining to Mary of Guise at 5 shillings for a stone weight. He was later discovered to be a counterfeiter of Scottish money.

=== John Acheson ===
In January 1562 the goldsmith and royal mint worker John Acheson and his partner John Aslowan obtained a contract for lead mines in Glengonnar, or Leadhills, and Wanlock, granted by Mary, Queen of Scots. They were permitted to export lead ore to Flanders. In 1566 their rights were disputed by another group of prospectors and mine operators, John Johnston, Robert Kerr, and John Gibson of the Queen's Guard. Gibson had a contract for lead dating back to October 1560, which he had transferred to Johnston, James Lindsay, and Aslowan. Johnston and Ker were also factors for the Earl of Atholl who had a tack or lease for lead mines, granted in 1565. The Privy Council found in favour of Johnston and Aslowan and their "ejection" of Acheson from his tack.

=== Luke Wilson ===
The Earl of Atholl arranged for Luke Wilson, with James Johnston of Kellobank and Robert Ker, to manage his mining contract with the queen. The treasurer's accounts include the receipt of duty on exported ore. The Wilson family gained a property in the area at "Bakke", near Roberton, when Luke's son married Katherine Johnsoun. Luke Wilson was a prominent Edinburgh burgess who had been tasked in 1561 to organise a pageant and a banquet to celebrate the royal entry of Mary, Queen of Scots. He may have the man named Luke Wilson who in 1542 lived at Biggar, a staging post on the route from the mines to Edinburgh. Robert Johnston managed the Atholl contract between 1571 and 1573. Barrels containing lead ore for export to Flanders were officially marked with branding irons by the Scottish mint, which was known as the "Cunze Hous".

=== George and Marion Douglas ===
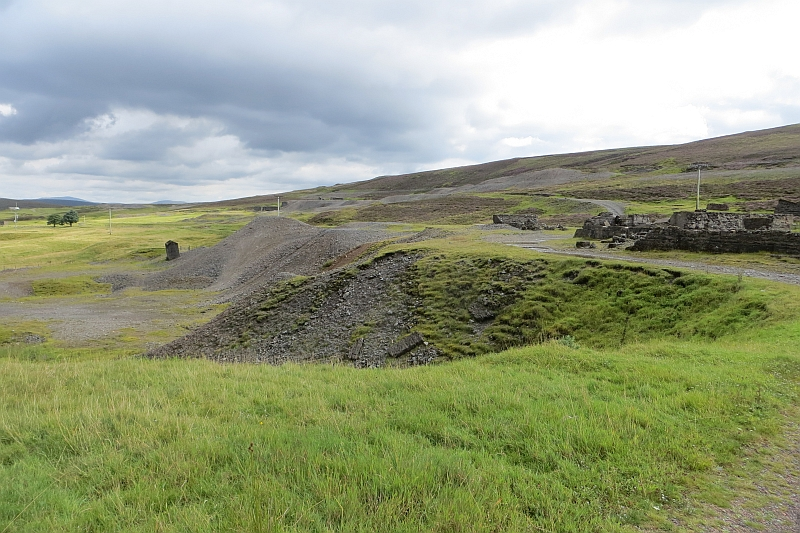
Old lead mine workings at the head of Glengonnar

When Regent Morton ruled Scotland on behalf of the young James VI and I, his half-brother George Douglas of Parkhead was involved in lead mining at Wanlockhead, Glengonnar, and Leadhills in Lanarkshire and in Orkney. In June 1581 Parkhead's interest in the lead mines and all the stocks of lead ore were confiscated and given to the royal favourite James Stewart, Earl of Arran. Arran and his wife Elizabeth Stewart made a contract to sell lead ore to Flanders merchants. In June 1585, Arran leased the mines to Eustachius Roche.

George Douglas of Parkhead regained ownership of some lead mines. His wife, Marion Douglas (heiress of Parkhead, near Douglas, South Lanarkshire), helped manage their mines. On 6 August 1592 Marion Douglas wrote from Parkhead to Lord Menmuir, the royal Master of Mines, asking for his decision about the mining concessions made between the prospector Eustachius Roche and her husband. She had been obliged to order her miners to suspend working, putting them to other work or laying them off.

Two weeks later, George Douglas was allowed the tack (a nineteen-year lease) of mines or workings at the Waterhead or Over Glengonar near Leadhills. The resource was apparently under-exploited and Eustachius Roche's rights were set aside. Parkhead was encouraged to set his men to work at the mine right away to maximise royal profit (paid in fine silver) in the current tax year.

Around this time, there was a debate whether it was more profitable to refine ores in Scotland (where local expertise was said to be scarce) or export them abroad. Much of the lead ore contained a proportion of valuable silver, from which the crown and the Master of Mines hoped to maximise revenue. The agreed rate was fifty ounces of silver for every 1,000 stone weight of lead ore. An ounce of fine silver was worth 40 Scottish shillings. In December 1593 complaints were made that George Douglas of Parkhead had extracted far more lead ore than the quota corresponding to the silver duty he had contracted to pay.

=== Thomas Foulis ===
On 20 December 1593 George Douglas and his son James made over some of their lead mining rights in Glengonnar to the goldsmith and financier Thomas Foulis, who became known as Thomas Foulis of Leadhills.

In March 1594 one of Foulis' mining experts Bernard Fechtenburg was tempted away from his works by Lord Menmuir, the Master of Metals, to work for Sir David Lindsay of Edzell Castle. Fechtenburg said that Edzell's samples of ores were more promising than an assay made by Foulis' other experts. Foulis obtained a royal grant to prospect and mine for gold, silver, lead, tin and other metals, in Lanarkshire in April 1594. The grant included the mines previously worked or managed by George Douglas.

Foulis was asked to obtain lead in England to repair the roof of Linlithgow Palace in 1594, during preparations for the baptism of Prince Henry at Stirling Castle.

In June 1597 after one of Foulis's convoys carrying lead from Crawford Muir towards Edinburgh was robbed by border outlaws, the Privy Council authorised Foulis's carriers to have a lead badge with the king's arms and wear Foulis's own insignia, and anyone who tried to rob them would be executed. Thomas Foulis's businesses came unstuck, and his relation, the diplomat Master David Foulis leased the lead mines to others. William Stanhope took over some of Foulis's mines. The men Stanhope employed to carry lead to Leith sold it instead, and they also took timber from his wood at Dalpedder near Mennock. The English mining entrepreneur Bevis Bulmer also became a partner in the lead mines. One of his employees, Thomas Harvey, was robbed by men from Biggar at Abington in 1600 while carrying a chest with rich clothing and jewels.

=== At Veere ===
In 1599, Jacob Barroun formed a partnership with Archibald Johnstone to export Scottish lead to Veere, and there was a dispute over customs duty payable on "royal lead". Barroun and Johnstone also claimed the "master weigher" at Veere worked unfairly against their interest, though other Scottish merchants at Veere made a statement in favour of the official.

=== James Hope ===
Foulis's holdings at Leadhills were operated by John Fairlie. Fairlie exported lead ore to the Netherlands in partnership with John and Ninian MacMorran. He supplied lead for the roof of Linlithgow Palace in 1620.

The mines passed to James Hope of Hopetoun (1614–1661) in 1639 when he married Anna Foulis (died 1656), including the site at Waterhead and Overglengonnar. After he obtained the lands, Hope abandoned a legal career. It was said that Hope employed many poor people in the works, keeping "mony pure and indigent pepill in the leid mynes and [who] be his meanis had a lyfliehood". Some prisoners who had fought with Montrose were sent to work in the mines. Much information about Hope and his mines can be found in his own diaries, which are published and available online. Hope recorded his dreams, which included watching workers operating a hand pump. He explored mining for lead at abandoned workings at Wanlockhead in 1647.

Hope also tried to obtain and work the silver mine at Hilderston near Bathgate. He was haunted by an image in a dream of the potential riches as a tree of pure silver. He exported lead with a partner, Francis Vanhoght of Middelburg. He travelled to meet his commercial contacts and see new technology; visiting and working in the laboratory of a chemist or metallurgist, Frans Rooy, to make assays of ore; meeting a German broker Peter Hexe who was trying to inflate the value of lead ore containing silver; and recruiting lead smelters who worked for Jean Meinershagen of Cologne. Hope examined furnaces for refining and making copperas at the "White Lead" works, L'ousine ou l'ouvrages de la blanch plumbier, beside the river Vesdre in the Liège Province in April 1646. There, lead shot was hardened by the addition of orpiment. Hope returned to Scotland via London, and at Grantham and Stilton he made enquiries about hiring experts from the Derbyshire lead mines.

In September 1647, Hope had a meeting with the Committee of the Sherrifdom of Clydesdale to discuss the duty paid for his lead works. The Committee examined his accounts on 28 October. Hope's wage bill was £6,000 yearly. He said his stock of ore already above ground was 25,000 stone weight. He tried to claim a rebate for equipment bought in Holland.

Hope successfully petitioned the Parliament of Scotland to legislate to help his business; by preventing middle-men in Leith selling his lead ore destined for export; and by preventing competing mine owners from making offers to employ his workmen. Similar legislation had already been enacted for workers in coal mines and salt pans, and seems to have restricted the freedom of labourers.

=== Lady Margaret Hope of Hopetoun ===
Margaret Hamilton (1649-1711) was a daughter of John Hamilton, 4th Earl of Haddington. As the widow of John Hope of Hopetoun (died 1682), she was the legal tutor of her son Charles Hope, 1st Earl of Hopetoun. She managed the family mines and improved facilities at Leith where there was a wind-powered mill for processing the ore. The lead product for export was known as "potter's ore", used for glazing ceramics.

Lady Margaret revived a plan to build a church for the miners at Leadhills, and made it easier for miners to leave or change their employment, thus reversing the working conditions previously instituted by James Hope. Her new employment policy was drafted as an "article for liberty". She invested in 1696 as an adventurer in the joint-stock of the Company of Scotland trading to Africa and the Indies, and in 1698 began building Hopetoun House near South Queensferry. Her portrait was painted by John de Medina.

=== Blackett, Lindsay, and Stansfield ===
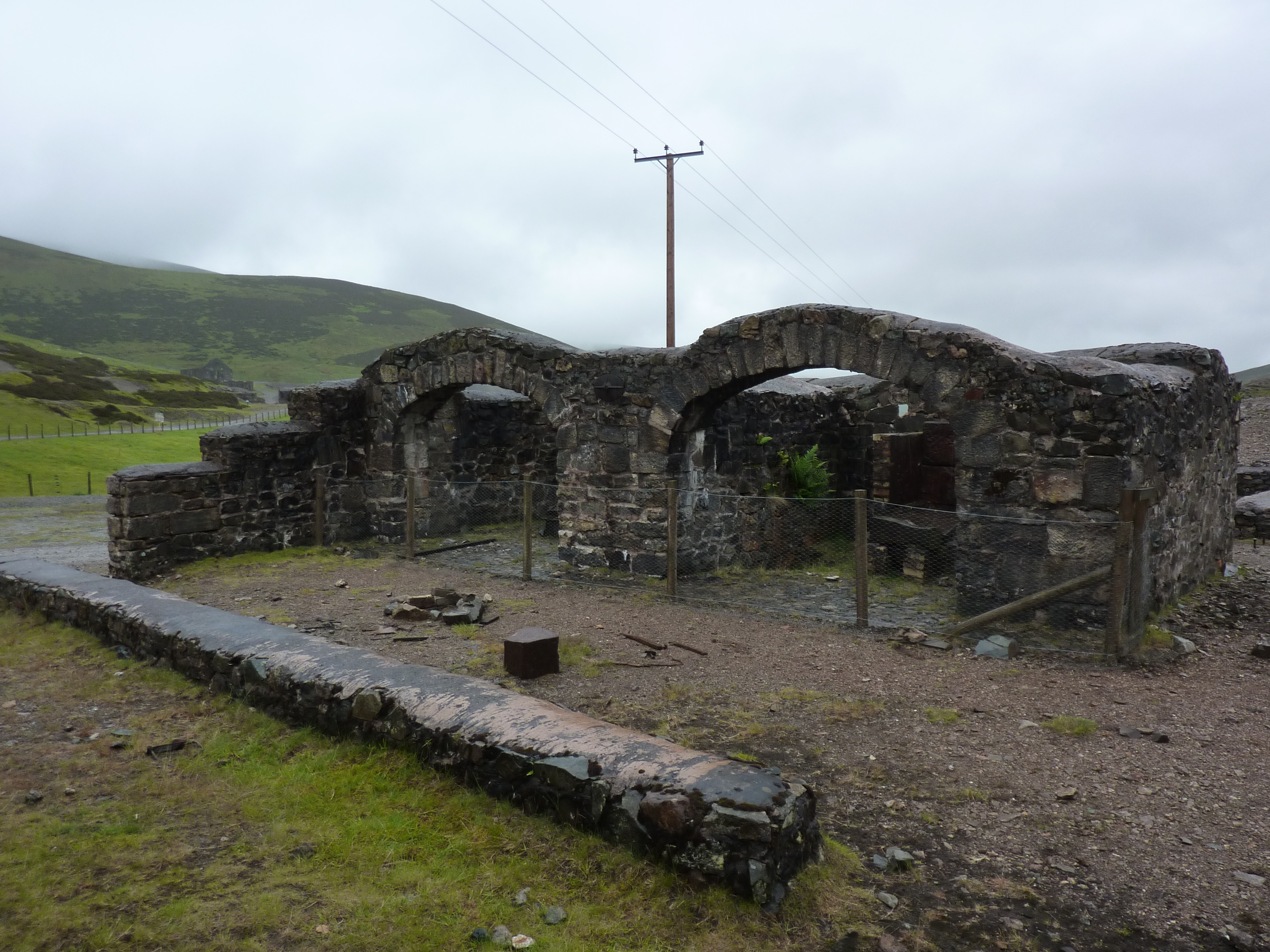
Former smelt mill for processing lead ore, Wanlockhead

Colonel James Stampfield, Standsfield, or Stansfield, proprietor of a cloth works at New Mills, East Lothian, improved the Straitsteps Mine near Wanlockhead from 1675, with his partners William Blackett and John Lindsay. They operated under licence from the Marquess of Queensberry. The operation was not very successful, facing competition from the nearby Hope mines, and their methods, including drainage pumps operated by hand, proved inadequate and uncompetitive. Stansfield initiated a project to make lead crystal drinking glasses at Leith. Standsfield was murdered by his son Philip in November 1687. Later pumps were powered by stream water, by horses, and by steam engine.

=== James Stirling ===
In 1715, lead mining at Leadhills was encouraged by the founding of the Scots Mining Company. The fortunes of the company were revived in 1734 when the mathematician James Stirling was appointed as a manager. A house built by the company for Stirling, probably designed by William Adam, survives. Stirling and Lord Hopetoun donated books to form the Miner's Library in 1741, the institution still flourishes.

=== Henry Kalmeter ===
Henry Kalmeter was a young Swedish writer who came to Scotland in 1719 and 1720 to report on mining and new technologies. He was employed by the Swedish mining authority, the Bergskollegium. Kalmeter had an uncle who taught music in Edinburgh. Proprietors were naturally secretive about their methods, anxious to protect their commercial advantages, so Kalmeter's and James Hope of Hopetoun's travels can be regarded as early forms of industrial espionage. Kalmeter visited Leadhills, and heard how the mines came into the Hope family by a marriage to an heiress. He described the Raik or Reckhead vein, mined at the High Works, the Brown vein, and Laverock Hall vein, and "Watboth" vein. Timber for the mines was brought from Annandale. Lord Hopetoun exported the ore to a company of merchants in Rotterdam. The Hope crushing mill and windmill in Leith had been forced to close due to commercial pressure from the Rotterdam company. Kalmeter drew a diagram of the smelting-hearth method used at Leadhills.The nearby lead mines at Wanlockhead belonged to the Duke of Queensberry. Kalmeter visited other mines in Scotland, commented briefly on some historic sites, and described the Leith Sugar House.

=== Richard Pococke ===
The English traveller Richard Pococke came to Leadhills in May 1760, and wrote a description in a letter to his sister. The mining area mostly belonged to Lord Hopetoun with some mines on the estate of the Duke of Queensberry. The mines were operated by three companies except a few were managed directly by Lord Hopetoun. Smelt mills, furnaces, for refining the lead ore were fueled with coal from Douglas and turf or peat. The villagers used coal from a mine near Sanquhar Castle in their homes.

The Susanna vein carried a lead ore in the form of rectangular shining crystals. The lead was transported to Leith, and shipped to Holland where it was processed again to extract the silver. The final use was manufacture of red lead and white lead pigment. The agent and manager was still James Stirling. Other sources mention lead compounds used to make pottery glazes. Later, two specific forms of lead ore, susannite and leadhillite, identified and described in 1832, were named after the Leadhills vein. Lanarkite, another form found at Leadhills, was used by Korean physicists in 2023 in an attempt to make a room-temperature superconductor.

Pococke visited Garleis Castle and saw apparently unsuccessful mine workings near Newton Stewart and the Ferrytown of Cree. He visited a lead mine at Castlandhill near Inverkeithing on the lands of the Earl of Morton, owner of nearby Aberdour Castle. He was told that lead was plentiful on Islay. The 16th-century writer Donald Monro mentioned lead on Islay, noting "mekle leid ure in Moychaolis". James IV of Scotland had sent William Striveling to open a mine in 1511, and there is archaeological evidence of mining as early as 1360.

=== Dorothy Wordsworth ===
Dorothy Wordsworth described a tour of Nithsdale and a visit to Wanlockhead with Samuel Taylor Coleridge in 1803, later published as Recollections of a Tour Made in Scotland. She was interested to note the small plots of land cultivated by the villagers, in contrast to her experience of the English countryside. They saw a large stone building holding a beam engine to pump water. William Wordsworth remarked that the machinery had "made the first step from brute matter to life and purpose", while Coleridge called it "a giant with one idea". She thought the building resembled a fortress in a woodcut illustration for John Bunyan's Holy War. They saw timber being carted to the works. The party stayed at an inn managed by Mrs Otto rather than the Hopetoun Arms at Leadhills. She was told that the Company House, or a mansion belonging to the Hope family, was H-shaped, representing the Hope family, but realised this was not true.

Coleridge later used the memorable formula, "a giant with one idea", developed during their discussion at Wanlockhead, to describe the character of the English abolitionist Thomas Clarkson.
