= Scotlandite =

Sulfite mineral

General
- Category: Sulfite
- Formula: PbSO_{3}
- IMA symbol: Sct
- Strunz classification: 4/K.01-10
- Crystal system: Monoclinic
- Crystal class: 2/m - Prismatic
- Space group: P2_{1}/m (no. 11)
- Unit cell: a = 4.505 Å, b = 5.333 Å c = 6.405 Å; β= 106.24°; Z = 2

Identification
- Formula mass: 287.26
- Color: Pale yellow, greyish-white, colorless, transparent
- Crystal habit: Spear-shaped crystals
- Cleavage: Perfect along {100} and good along {010}
- Tenacity: Radiating clusters
- Mohs scale hardness: 2
- Luster: Adamantine, Pearly
- Diaphaneity: Transparent
- Density: 6.37 g/cm^{3}
- Optical properties: Biaxial positive
- Refractive index: n_{α}= 2.035 n_{β}= 2.040 n_{γ}= 2.085
- Birefringence: δ = 0.050
- Dispersion: v >> r strong
- Absorption spectra: Strong 900 cm^{−1}

Scotlandite is a sulfite mineral first discovered in a mine at Leadhills in South Lanarkshire, Scotland, an area known to mineralogists and geologists for its wide range of different mineral species found in the veins that lie deep in the mine shafts. This specific mineral is found in the Susanna vein of Leadhills, where the crystals are formed as chisel-shaped or bladed. Scotlandite was actually the first naturally occurring sulfite, which has the ideal chemical formula of PbSO_{3}. The mineral has been approved by the Commission on New Minerals and Mineral Names, IMA, to be named scotlandite for Scotland.

== Occurrence ==
Scotlandite is found in association with pyromorphite, anglesite, lanarkite, leadhillite, susannite, and barite. It occurs in cavities in massive barite and anglesite, and is closely associated with lanarkite and susannite. Scotlandite represents the latest phase in the crystallization sequence of the associated lead secondary minerals. It can often be found in the vuggy anglesite as yellowish single crystals up to 1 millimeter in length that sometimes arrange in a fan-shaped aggregates. Anglesite can usually be recognized in a very thin coating on scotlandite which is used to protect the sulfite from further oxidation. A second variety of scotlandite can also occur in discontinuously distributed cavities between the anglesite mass containing the first variety and the barite matrix. This variety is characterized by tiny, whitish to water-clear crystals, and crystal clusters less than one millimeter in size, which encrust large portions of the interior of the cavities. Scotlandite is a uniquely rare mineral, as it occurs in small amounts in few locations around the world.

== Physical properties ==
Scotlandite is a pale yellow, greyish-white, colorless, transparent mineral with an adamantine or pearly luster. It exhibits a hardness of 2 on the Mohs hardness scale. Scotlandite occurs as chisel-shaped or bladed crystals elongated along the c-axis, with a tendency to form radiating clusters. Its crystals are characterized by the {100}, {010}, {011}, {021}, {031}, and {032}. faces. Scotlandite shows perfect cleavage along the {100} plane and a less good one along the {010} plane. The measured density is 6.37 g/cm^{3}.

== Optical properties ==
Scotlandite is biaxial positive, which means it will refract light along two axes. The mineral is optically biaxial positive, 2V_{meas.} 35° 24'(Na). The refractive indices are: α ~ 2.035, β ~ 2.040, and γ ~ 2.085 (Na). Dispersion is strong, v >> r. The extinction is β//b, and α [001] = 20° (γ [100] = 4° in the obtuse angle β. H(Mohs) < 2. D = 6.37 and calculated D_{x} = 6.40 g cm^{−3}. The infrared spectrum of scotlandite shows conclusively that it is an anhydrous sulfite, with no OH groups or other polyatomic anions being present. It is also proven by electron microprobe analysis and infrared spectroscopy that scotlandite must be a polymorph of lead sulfite.

== Chemical properties ==
Scotlandite is a sulfite compared with chemically related compounds, it is very close to the value of anglesite (6.38 g cm_{−3}), but distinctly different from that of lanarkite (6.92 g cm_{−3}). Orthorhombic lead sulfite is of higher density (D_{meas} = 6.54, calculated D_{x} = 6.56 g cm^{−3}), and has the same chemical properties as well. The empirical chemical formula for scotlandite calculated on the basis of Pb+S = 2, is Pb_{l.06}S_{0.94}O_{2.94} or more ideally PbSO_{3}.

== Chemical composition ==
Oxide	wt%	Range
SO_{2}	19.88	17.89-22.30
PbO	77.85	79.03-77.70
Total	97.73	96.92-100.00

== X-ray crystallography ==
A small crystal of scotlandite, showing some cleavage faces, was examined using Weissenberg and precession techniques. Scotlandite is in the monoclinic crystal system. The only systematic extinctions observed from the single crystal patterns were 0k0 where k was odd. Thus the possible space group is either P2 or P2/m. The unit cell parameters obtained from the single crystal study were used to index the X-ray powder pattern and were then refined with the indexed powder data. A subsequent study determined the space group is P2_{1}/m (no. 11) with unit cell dimensions: a = 4.505 Å, b = 5.333 Å, c = 6.405 Å; β= 106.24°; Z = 2. If the present a and c axes are interchanged, the unit cell of scotlandite is very similar, isotypic, to that of molybdomenite, PbSeO_{3}. Lead is coordinated to nine oxygen atoms with Pb-O_{av}=2.75 Å, and possibly further to one sulfur atom with Pb−S=3.46 Å. The average S−O distance in the pyramidal SO_{3} group is 1.52 Å.

== See also ==
List of Minerals
