= Macphersonite =

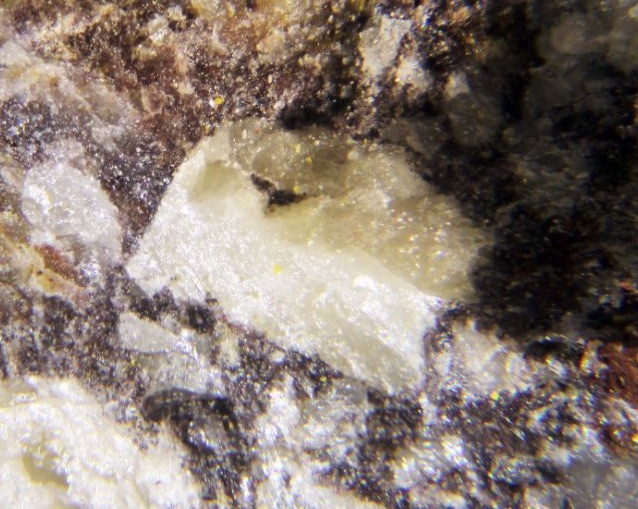

General
- Category: Carbonate mineral
- Formula: Pb_{4}(SO_{4})(CO_{3})_{2} (OH)_{2}
- IMA symbol: Mps
- Strunz classification: 5.BF.40
- Dana classification: 17.01.04.01
- Crystal system: Orthorhombic
- Crystal class: Dipyramidal (mmm); H-M symbol: (2/m 2/m 2/m)
- Space group: Pcab
- Unit cell: a = 10.37 Å, b = 23.10 Å, c = 9.25 Å, β = 106.43°; Z = 8

Identification
- Formula mass: 1,078.90 g/mol
- Color: White, pale amber, colorless
- Crystal habit: Pseudo hexagonal, tabular
- Twinning: Polysynthetic, lamellar, contact
- Cleavage: Perfect on {010}
- Fracture: Uneven
- Mohs scale hardness: 2.5 - 3
- Luster: Adamantine, otherwise resinous
- Streak: White
- Specific gravity: 6.50
- Optical properties: Biaxial (-)
- Refractive index: nα = 1.870 nβ = 2.000 nγ = 2.010
- Birefringence: δ = 0.140
- 2V angle: 35-36°
- Dispersion: r > v
- Ultraviolet fluorescence: A very strong and vivid yellow
- Other characteristics: Polymorph of leadhillite and susannite

Macphersonite, Pb_{4}(SO_{4})(CO_{3})_{2} (OH)_{2}, is a carbonate mineral that is trimorphous with leadhillite and susannite. Macphersonite is generally white, colorless, or a pale amber in color and has a white streak. It crystallizes in the orthorhombic system with a space group of Pcab. It is fairly soft mineral that has a high specific gravity.

Macphersonite is named after Harry Gordon Macpherson, a keeper of minerals at the Royal Scottish Museum. It was discovered and accepted in 1984.

== Structure ==
The structure of macphersonite is represented as a sequence of three layers stacked along the [001]. The first layer is a sulfate tetrahedra, the second is of lead and hydroxide, and the third is a layer composed of lead and carbonate. Stacking of the three layers can be detailed as ...BABCCBABCC... similar to leadhillite. Two C layers of lead carbonate in the BAB stacking provide a weak connection that leads to the perfect {001} cleavage.

== Physical properties ==
The Leadhills macphersonite is a very pale amber to colorless in color, while the Argentolle mine macphersonite is colorless to white. It has a luster of adamantine on fresh surfaces and elsewhere it is resinous. Macphersonite is soft with a 2.5-3 on the Mohs hardness, has an uneven fracture with a high density of 6.5g/cm^{3}.

Macphersonite has a very strong yellow fluorescence under both long and short wave, ultraviolet is displayed by the Leadhills specimens, the Argentolle material does not fluoresce.

== Occurrence ==
Macphersonite is found in the Leadhills region of southwest Scotland and in the Saint-Prix, Saône-et-Loire region of France. It is the rarest of the three polymorphs. It occurs in lead deposits associated with cerussite, susannite, caledonite, scotlandite, leadhillite, galena and pyromorphite.
