= Archibald Stirling =

Archibald Stirling may refer to:

- Archibald Stirling, Lord Garden (1617–1668), Scottish judge
- Archibald Stirling, father of Sir William Stirling-Maxwell, 9th Baronet (1818–1878), art historian
- Archibald Stirling (British Army officer) (1867–1931), Scottish Scots Guards Brigadier General and Member of Parliament
- Archibald David Stirling (1915–1990), known as David Stirling, Scottish officer in the British Army and the founder and creator of the Special Air Service
- Archie Stirling (born 1941), Scottish Scots Guards officer and theatrical producer

== See also ==
- Clan Stirling, a Scottish Lowlands clan, several of whom are named "Archibald"
