= Leadhills Supergroup =

Geological formation in Scotland

The Leadhills Supergroup, formerly the Leadhills Group is a geological supergroup in Scotland. The Supergroup is named after the village of Leadhills.

Palaeoflow direction obtained from the horizons of the Corsewell Pont Conglomerate and the Glenn App Conglomerate indicates derivation from the north-west, presumed to be the Midland Valley arc.

Dates of detrital muscovite and garnet are c. 480-460 Ma, indicating an origin from metamorphic activity during the exhumation of the Dalradian Supergroup after the Grampian Orogeny

== Composition ==
Greywackes, shales, siltstones and mudstones with conglomerates.

== Eras ==
Abereiddian Stage of the Ashgill series, Late Ordovician.

== Boundaries ==
The south-eastern boundary is the Orlock Bridge Fault.
