= Leadhills =

Village in South Lanarkshire, Scotland

Coordinates: 55.4162°N 3.7629°W

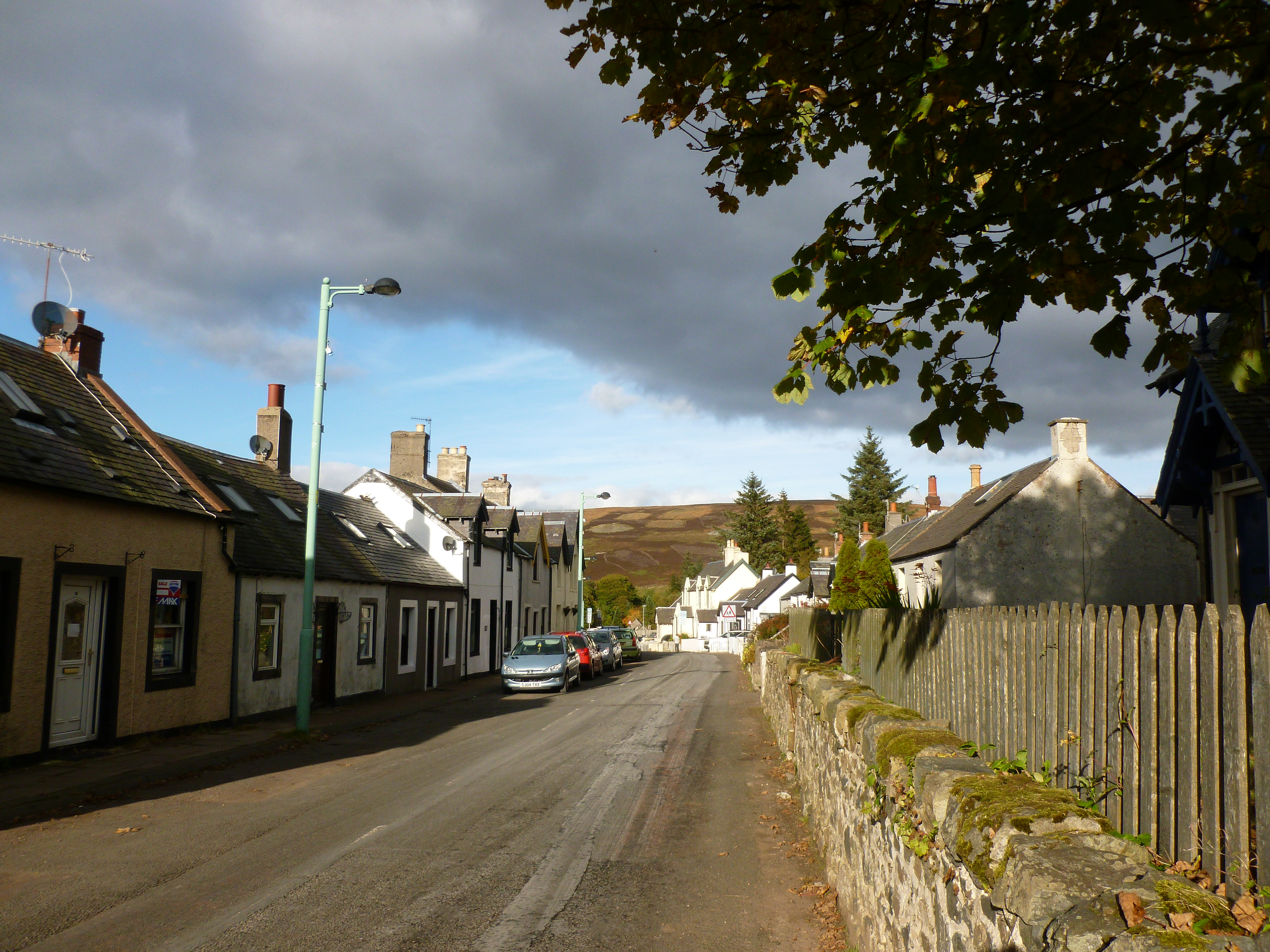
- Main Street, Leadhills

- Location within South Lanarkshire
- Population: 315
- OS grid reference: NS885150
- Council area: South Lanarkshire
- Lieutenancy area: Lanarkshire
- Country: Scotland
- Sovereign state: United Kingdom
- Post town: Biggar
- Postcode district: ML12
- Police: Scotland
- Fire: Scottish
- Ambulance: Scottish
- UK Parliament: Dumfriesshire, Clydesdale and Tweeddale
- Scottish Parliament: Clydesdale

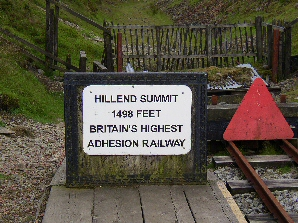
Hillend Summit, Glengonnar Station, 1,498 feet (457 m) ASL.

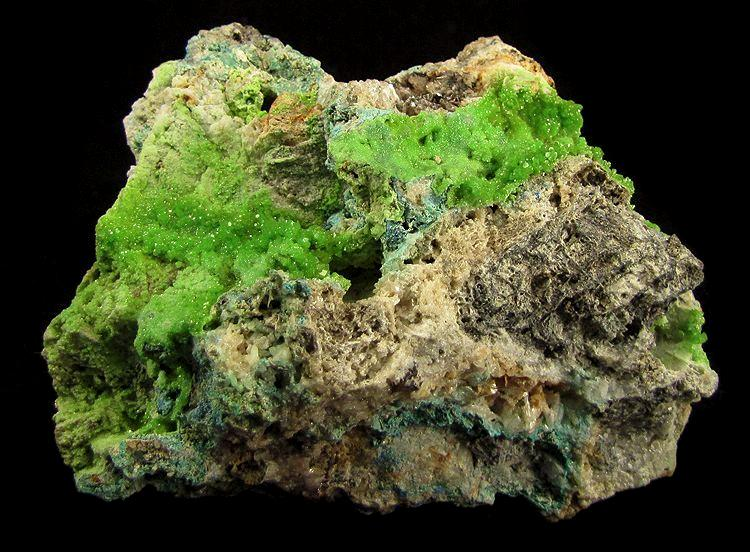
Green pyromorphite microcrystals cover the vuggy, quartz-rich matrix. Seams of tiny cerussite crystals and crusts of contrasting, powder-blue caledonite round out this very rich lead ore specimen from an old Leadhills mine. Size: 7.5 x 5.4 x 3.2 cm.

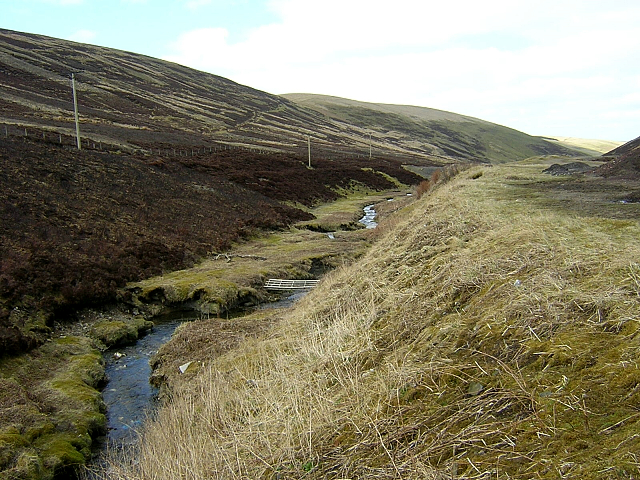
Glengonnar Water near Leadhills

Leadhills, originally settled for the accommodation of miners, is a village in South Lanarkshire, Scotland, 5 3/4 miles (9.3 km) WSW of Elvanfoot. The population in 1901 was 835. It was originally known as Waterhead.

It is the second highest village in Scotland, the highest being neighbouring Wanlockhead, 2 miles (3 kilometres) south. It is near the source of Glengonnar Water, a tributary of the River Clyde.

== Local attractions ==
=== Library ===
The Leadhills Miners' Library (also known as the Allan Ramsay Library or the Leadhills Reading Society), founded in 1741 by 21 miners, the local schoolteacher and the local minister, specifically to purchase a collection of books for its members’ mutual improvement—its membership was not restricted to the miners; several non-miners, such as William Symington, John Brown (author of Rab and his Friends) and James Braid, were also full members—houses an extensive antiquarian book collection, local relics, mining records and minerals. The library is the oldest subscription library in the British Isles; and is of significant historical and geological importance.

In the late eighteenth century, Peterkin observed the library had "as many valuable books as might be expected to be chosen by promiscuous readers"; he found its members to be "the best informed, and therefore the most reasonable common people that I know" (1799, p. 99); and, in 1823, "J", observing that "every miner can read, and most of them can write tolerably well", noted the library had around 1,200 volumes, all of which "have been entirely chosen by [the members] themselves", and that:

As the miners work only six of the twenty-four hours in the mines, and as the barrenness of the soil affords little scope for agricultural pursuits, they have of course abundance of time for reading: and I believe they generally employ it to good purpose; for many of them can converse upon historical, scientific, and theological points so as to astonish a stranger; and even on political questions, they express their opinions with great acuteness and accuracy.

Today, the library is owned and run by a registered charity, The Leadhills Heritage Trust and has full accreditation with Museums Galleries Scotland. It is open from Easter to September on weekends and bank holidays, between 2 pm and 5 pm.

=== Grouse moors ===
Grouse moors cover in excess of 11,000 acres (45 km^{2}) around Leadhills. The area covered by the grouse moors has been identified as a location of several wildlife crimes involving raptor persecution.

=== Golf course ===
Leadhills Golf Club, instituted in 1891, is the highest in Scotland. The nine-hole course offers a considerable challenge as the winds can be high and unpredictable as they are channelled between the hills.

At one time, there were two courses amalgamated into 18 holes before it was decided to stick with 9 holes on the lower ground and abandon the original course.

The club was originally known as Leadhills Golf Club prior to World War 1, but it was renamed Lowthers Golf Club following the war, until 1935 when it reverted back to its original name.

The club as we know it today was founded in 1935. An exhibition game was played as part of the opening ceremony, players included Walker Cup player Leonard Crawley.

The clubhouse was upgraded in 2013 after planning permission was sought from South Lanarkshire Council to build the £17,000 cabin. The previous clubhouse was built in the 1980s.

=== Grave of John Taylor ===
The grave of John Taylor is also available to visit in the cemetery. Reputed to be 137 years of age at the time of his death, Taylor's grave (shared with his son, Robert) even attracted the attention of the BBC.

=== Scots Mining Company House ===
The Scots Mining Company House was built in 1736 for James Stirling, the managing agent of the Scots Mining Company. It is attributed to the architect William Adam and is now a category A listed building.

=== Leadhills and Wanlockhead Railway ===
The Leadhills and Wanlockhead Railway runs at weekends only and at Christmas sees the "Santa Express" which includes a ride on the train, a visit to Santa down the lead mine and a story read by "Mrs Kringle" in the Museum of Lead Mining, Wanlockhead. The Elvanfoot railway station was on the Caledonian Railway main line from Glasgow to the south. A branch from there ran through Leadhills to Wanlockhead and operated until 1939. Part of the route has been reused by the Leadhills & Wanlockhead Railway. The railway is 1,498 feet (457 m) above sea level.

=== Lowther Hills Ski Centre ===
The Lowther Hills is one of the birthplaces of Scottish winter sports. Curling in Leadhills can be traced back to 1784, when the Leadhills Curling Club –one of Scotland's first Curling societies- was created. The sport remained popular in the area until the 1930s, when the mines closed.

Since the 1920s skiing in the Leadhills area has been organised intermittently by a succession of local residents as well as several non-for-profit sports clubs. Lowther Hill, above the village, is home to the only ski area in the south of Scotland and Scotland's only community-owned ski centre. Operated by Lowther Hills Ski Club, the ski centre runs three ski lifts for beginners and intermediate skiers.

== Business ==
Leadhills is host to a number of small local businesses including shops and a hotel.

== Geology ==
=== Gold, silver and lead ===
Silver and lead have been mined in Leadhills and at nearby Wanlockhead for many centuries, according to some authorities even in Roman days. Gold was discovered in the reign of James IV and, in those early days, it was so famous for its exceptionally pure gold that the general area was known as "God's Treasure House in Scotland". During the 16th century, before the alluvial gold deposits were exhausted, 300 men worked over three summers and took away some £100,000 of gold (perhaps £500 million today): "Between 1538 and 1542, the district produced 1163 grams of gold for a crown for King James V of Scotland and 992 grams for a crown for his queen. Much of the gold coinage of James V and Mary Queen of Scots was minted from Leadhills gold ... No commercial gold mining appears to have taken place after 1620, but gold washing with a sluice box or pan was later to become a sometimes lucrative pastime of the lead miners" (Gillanders, 1981, pp. 235–236). Gold is still panned in the area with the correct licence.

=== Minerals ===
The minerals lanarkite, leadhillite, caledonite, susannite, plattnerite, scotlandite, macphersonite, chenite and mattheddleite were first found at Leadhills. The area is renowned among mineralogists and geologists for its wide range of different mineral species found in the veins that lie deep within the (now abandoned) mine shafts; with some now recognized as unique to the Leadhills area.

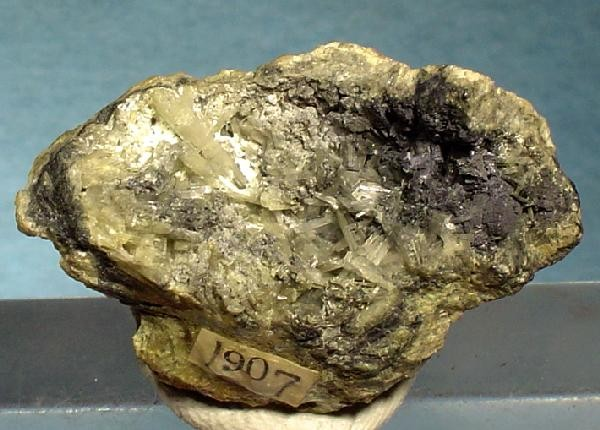
Lanarkite

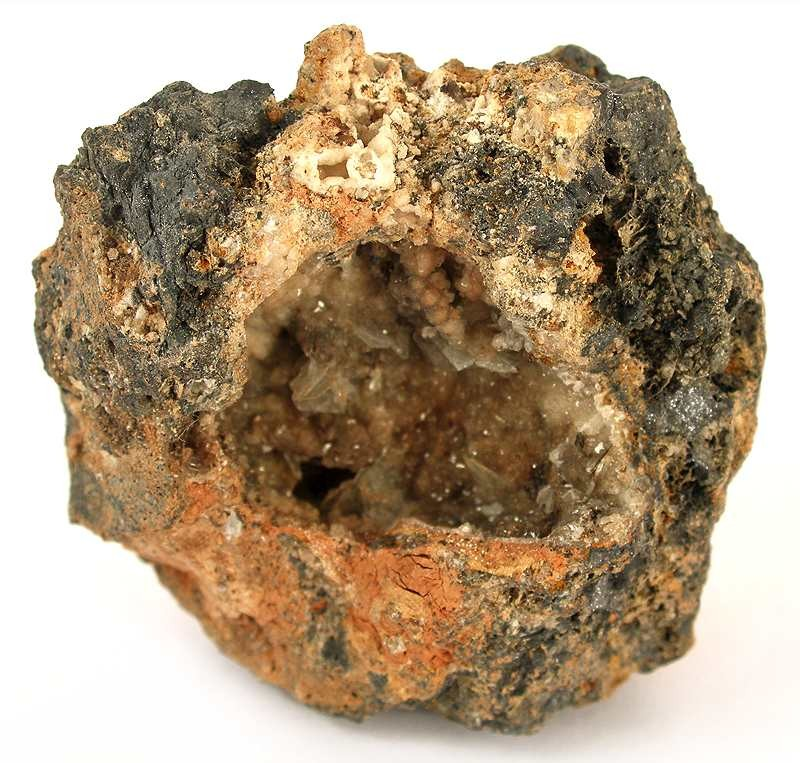
Leadhillite

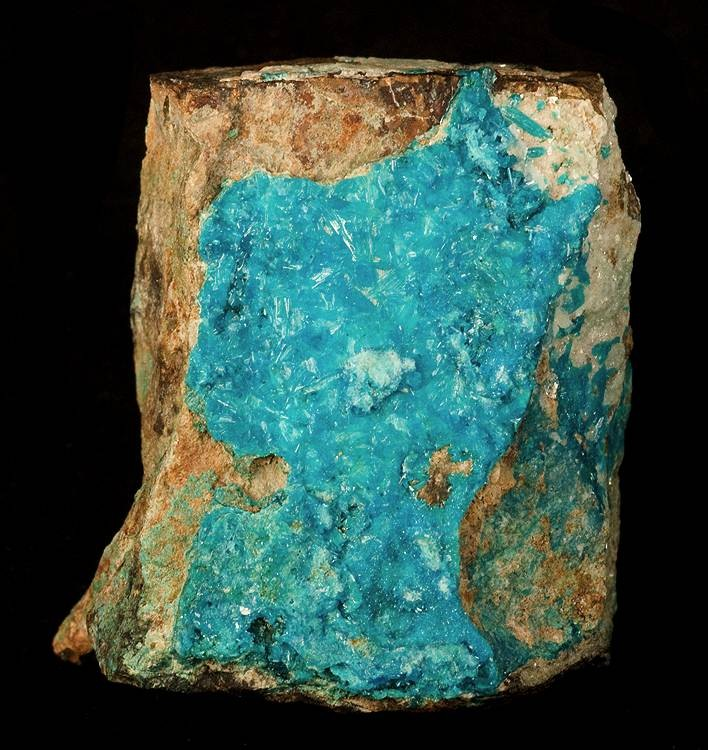
Caledonite

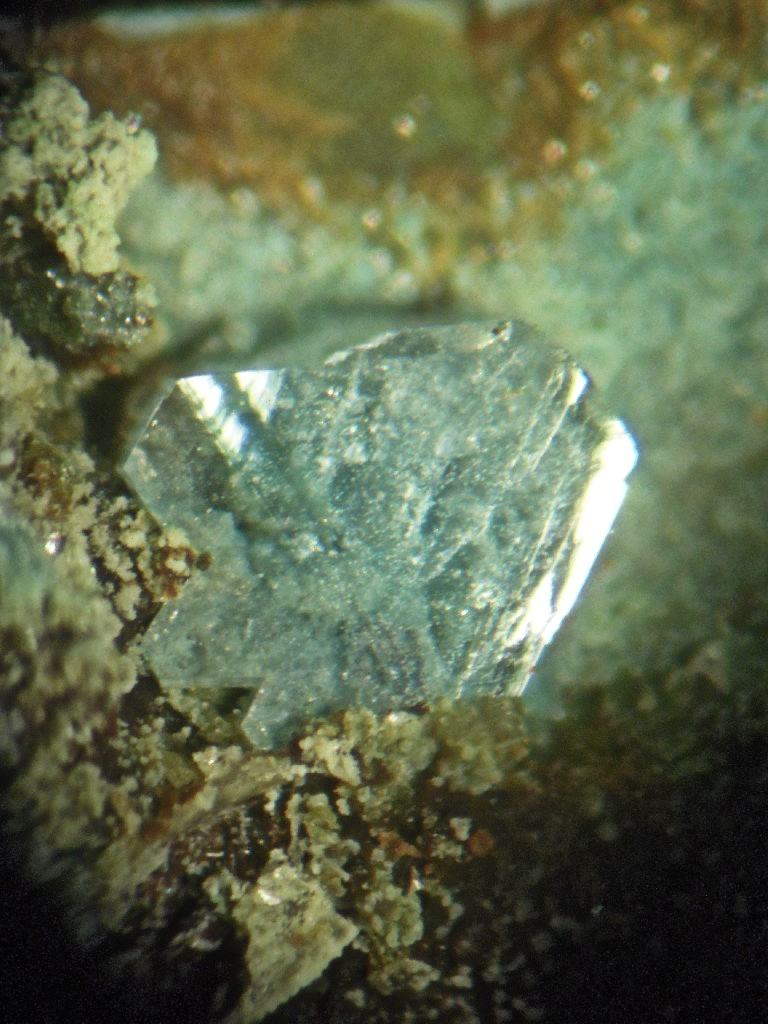
Susannite

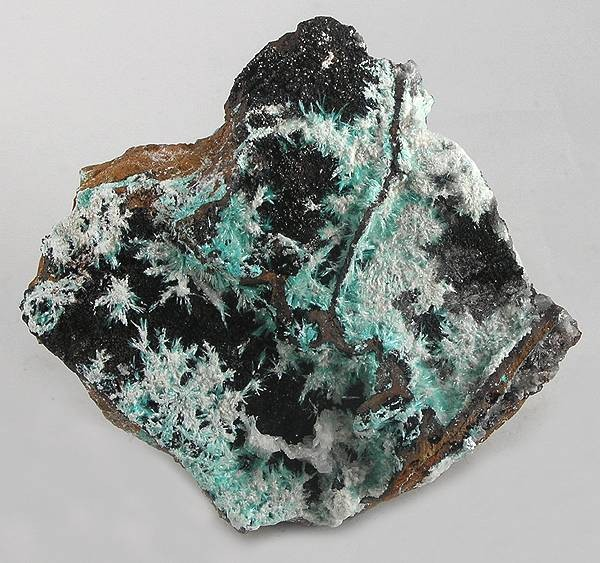
Plattnerite (white crystals)

Macphersonite (yellow-brown crystal)

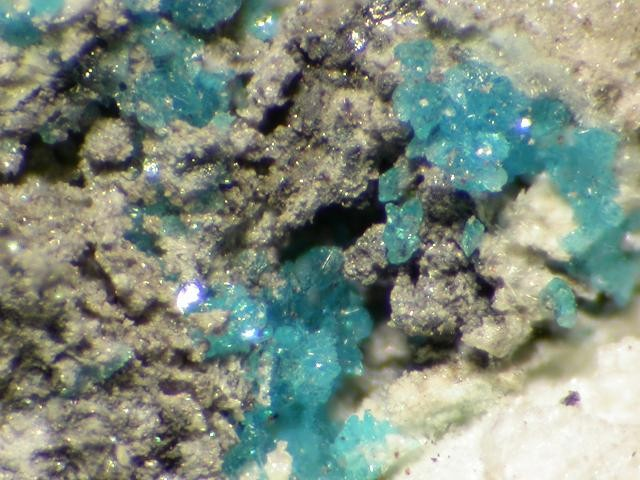
Chenite

=== Leadhills Supergroup ===
The village lends its name to the Leadhills Supergroup, one of the large geological features of the British Isles.

== Mining ==
16th-century mining entrepreneurs working the area were landowners, goldsmiths and metallurgists, granted patents by the monarch and Privy Council. These included, Cornelius de Vos, George Douglas of Parkhead, John Acheson, Eustachius Roche, Thomas Foulis, George Bowes, Bevis Bulmer, and Stephen Atkinson. In 1720 a Dutch traveller, Hugh Kalmeter, described the mine workings and noted that exported ore was used for pottery glazes. In the 18th-century lead ore was shipped to Holland and used to make white and red lead paint pigments.

=== Working conditions ===
The initial attraction of the Leadhills district was mining. On his visit to the mining area in 1772, the naturalist Thomas Pennant had remarked on its barren landscape:

"Nothing can equal the barren and gloomy appearance of the country round [Leadhills]: neither tree nor shrub, nor verdure, nor picturesque rock, appear to amuse the eye..."

Three years later, in 1776, artist William Gilpin found that, in relation to the working conditions, "the mines here, as in all mineral countries, are destructive of health", "you see an infirm frame, and squalid looks in most of the inhabitants". and twelve years later, according to Rev. William Peterkin (1738–1792), the Minister at Leadhills (and member of its library) from 1785 until his death, the conditions of both the miners and the lead smelters were no better:

The external appearance of Leadhills is ugly beyond description: rock, short heath, and barren [clay]. Every sort of vegetable is with difficulty raised and seldom comes to perfection. Spring water there is perhaps as fine as any in the world: but, the water below the smelting-[mills], is the most dangerous. The lead before smelting is broken very small and washed from extraneous matter. It contains frequently arsenic, sulphur, zinc, etc. which poisons the water in which it is washed. Fowls of any kind will not live many days at Leadhills. They pick up arsenical particles with their food, which, soon kills, them. Horses, cows, dogs, cats, are liable to the lead-brash. A cat, when seized with that distemper, springs like lightning through every corner of the house, falls into convulsions and dies. A dog falls into strong convulsions also but sometimes recovers. A cow grows perfectly mad in an instant and must be immediately killed. Fortunately, this distemper does not affect the human species.

As Pennant had noted in 1772, the human counterpart of the animals' lead-brash was "mill-reek":

The miners and smelters are subject here, as in other places, to the lead distemper, or mill-reek, as it is called here; which brings on palsies, and sometimes madness, terminating in death in about ten days.

However, because lead was attracting such high prices during the American and Napoleonic Wars, and the domestic construction boom, Leadhills became world-famous for its lead mines.

In a paper reporting on the treatment of a particular case of hydrothorax, published in 1823, James Braid commented that, given all of the theoretically possible causes, with his numerous Leadhills hydrothorax patients, "[those who] have been exposed to breathe noxious or confined air" were by far the majority:

[At Leadhills] the miners must sometimes work in places where there is so little circulation of air, that their candles can scarcely burn; and I have almost invariably observed, that a continuance for any considerable length of time, (although in such situations they may only work three or four hours daily), brings on pneumonia in the young and plethoric, and hydrothorax in the old, if rather of spare habit of body; and if there should happen to be any healthy middle-aged men working as hand-neighbours to these others, although of course both must breath[e] the same impure air, these middle-aged men will remain free from any urgent complaint, till both their young and their aged neighbours are laid aside, perhaps never more to return. I became so fully convinced of this fact, as long ago to have induced me to recommend to the agents and overseers of this place, to avoid, as much as possible, putting thither very young or very old men into such situations.

=== "Partnerships" ===
Like many metalliferous miners in other parts of the British Isles in the early 1800s, Leadhills miners did not work for daily wages; in fact, Leadhills miners lived rent-free, working no more than six hours in any one day and, significantly, had no fixed working hours.

At Leadhills, each miner belonged to an autonomous group of up to 12 (a "partnership"), who were paid collectively: on the basis of a contract (a "bargain") struck between one partner (the "taker") and the mining company, to perform a specific task for an agreed payment—in other words, the miners were paid for their results; not for the time they spent underground. There were two types of bargain:

- "tut-" or "fathom work": work with no immediate return—such as sinking shafts, driving levels, making excavations, etc.—for a specified "length", usually 12, 15, or 20 fathoms, for a fixed amount.
- "tribute work": raising the ore to the surface—where the miners took all the ore from a specific location and were paid according to the total weight of the ore, at
  - (a) a set rate per bing (thus, a "bingtale"), or
  - (b) according to the tonnage of smelted lead that ore had produced (thus, a "tontale").

The individual miner's family also contributed; the sons worked on the uncovered washing platforms (exposed to the elements in all weathers) washing the impurities from the ore prior to smelting, and the wives and daughters spun wool and embroidered muslin for sale in Glasgow.

The partners supplied their own tools; and were responsible for their upkeep. Many important responsibilities lay with the partners; thus, for instance, only two overseers were needed to manage more than 200 Leadhills’ miners. In the absence of an overseer's constant and immediate personal supervision, the partners were totally responsible for their collective work practices and occupational safety; thus, the partners, rather than overseers, would decide how to act against threats posed by subterranean water, loose ground, earth tremors, etc. However, with no overseer, there was also no oversight; and, often, hastily constructed passages/shafts were misaligned with those of other teams, affecting the structure of the entire mine—also, the disposal of waste and rubbish from one team's work area often impeded the progress of another team (or teams).

=== Steam engines ===
Coal-fired steam engines, were an important part of the operation at Leadhills. Leadhills had three steam engines as early as 1778 (Smout, 1967, p. 106). In the winter of 1765, James Watt had been approached to design and build a steam engine for Leadhills that would raise water from 30 fathoms (approx. 55 m) below the surface. Watt did not get the contract (Hills, 1998).

Report of Leadhills Accident

A most melancholy accident happened in the lead mines
belonging to Messrs Horner, Hurst, and Co. Leadhills, on the
forenoon of the 1st inst. occasioned by the air being rendered
impure from the smoke of a fire engine, placed about one
hundred feet underground.
As soon as the danger was ascertained. two miners and
the company‘s blacksmith descended to the relief of their
neighbours below, when unfortunately the two miners
perished in the humane attempt. The smith escaped but is
still dangerously ill. Many of the miners who were at work at
the time were violently affected, almost to suffocation, but are
now out of danger. We have since learned that in all seven
lives have been lost in this accident.
(Caledonian Mercury, Thursday, 6 March 1817)

=== 1817 mining accident ===
According to his later report (Braid, 1817), at 7:00 am on 1 March 1817, the mine's surgeon, James Braid, was called urgently to the mine to alleviate the distress of a number of miners who appeared to be suffocated.

It was later established that noxious fumes from the faulty chimney of a coal-fired steam engine, operating deep within the mine, had combined with a dense fog pervading the entire area. The contaminated air was lethal.

Two men, in the hope of finishing early, and contrary to established Leadhills custom, had entered the mine before 4 am; another two, presumably from the same partnership, entered soon after. Reaching their work level (at 25 fathoms) the first two encountered the bad air. They persisted, thinking they could force their way through it, began to feel dizzy, collapsed, and eventually suffocated. The next two encountered a similar fate. The accident was not discovered until some time after 6 am; by which time all of the four men were dead.

To aid those at the 25-fathom level, who were beginning to become violently affected by the fumes, a trap-door was opened to help clear the air; however, the noxious fumes descended rapidly, and another three men, at the 80-fathom level, suffocated. The other miners, many of whom were affected to a considerable degree, were restored by Braid as they emerged from the mine.

== Cemetery ==
The cemetery at the northeast of the village features an unusual table-stone inscription (next to the southern wall) detailing, almost as an afterthought, 137 years as the age at death of John Taylor, the father of Robert Taylor, (then) overseer of the Scotch Mining Company.

Near to the cemetery overlooking a row of miners' cottages is an 1891 memorial in obelisk form was erected to William Symington, by public subscription, where he was born.

== Notable residents ==
Allan Ramsay, the poet, and William Symington (1763–1831), one of the earliest adaptors of the steam engine to the purposes of navigation, were born at Leadhills.

The famous mathematician James Stirling was employed by the Scots Mining Company at Leadhills from 1734 until 1770. James Braid, the (later) discoverer of hypnotism, was surgeon to the Leadhills mining community and to Lord Hopetoun's lead and silver mines from early 1816 to late 1825. Edward Whigham, Provost of Sanquhar and friend of Robert Burns was born in Leadhills.

== Climate ==
Leadhills experiences an oceanic climate (Cfb), bordering on a subpolar oceanic climate (Cfc). Due to its elevation and inland position, winters are colder and summers cooler than lower lying areas. In terms of the local climate profile, given its elevated position and latitude, Leadhills is among the coldest places in the British Isles. According to the second most recent 30-year climate period of 1981-2010 Leadhills is the second coldest village in the UK (of those with weather stations) with an annual mean temperature of 6.76 °C (44.17 °F) making it slightly colder than the commonly regarded coldest settlement of Braemar, which had an annual average temperature of 6.81 °C (44.26 °F) in this period. However, Leadhills' slightly more exposed and elevated location than Braemar results in absolute minima being higher than one might expect - the December absolute minimum of −15.0 °C (5.0 °F) compares favourably to usually milder Glasgow Airport's absolute minimum of −20.0 °C (−4.0 °F).

Climate data for Leadhills: 393m (1991–2020 normals; extremes 1959–2020)
Month	Jan	Feb	Mar	Apr	May	Jun	Jul	Aug	Sep	Oct	Nov	Dec	Year
Record high °C (°F)	10.9 (51.6)	13.2 (55.8)	19.5 (67.1)	23.8 (74.8)	26.8 (80.2)	28.2 (82.8)	28.4 (83.1)	28.5 (83.3)	24.8 (76.6)	21.7 (71.1)	14.6 (58.3)	12.8 (55.0)	28.5 (83.3)
Mean daily maximum °C (°F)	4.5 (40.1)	4.9 (40.8)	7.0 (44.6)	9.8 (49.6)	13.4 (56.1)	15.5 (59.9)	17.3 (63.1)	16.7 (62.1)	14.3 (57.7)	10.4 (50.7)	7.0 (44.6)	4.9 (40.8)	10.5 (50.8)
Daily mean °C (°F)	1.9 (35.4)	2.1 (35.8)	3.7 (38.7)	5.8 (42.4)	8.7 (47.7)	11.2 (52.2)	13.1 (55.6)	12.7 (54.9)	10.7 (51.3)	7.3 (45.1)	4.3 (39.7)	2.3 (36.1)	7.0 (44.6)
Mean daily minimum °C (°F)	−0.6 (30.9)	−0.8 (30.6)	0.2 (32.4)	1.8 (35.2)	4.0 (39.2)	6.9 (44.4)	8.9 (48.0)	8.6 (47.5)	6.9 (44.4)	4.2 (39.6)	1.5 (34.7)	−0.5 (31.1)	3.4 (38.2)
Record low °C (°F)	−14.1 (6.6)	−14.0 (6.8)	−15.0 (5.0)	−9.4 (15.1)	−6.8 (19.8)	−3.1 (26.4)	0.0 (32.0)	−1.1 (30.0)	−3.4 (25.9)	−7.4 (18.7)	−10.5 (13.1)	−15.0 (5.0)	−15.0 (5.0)
Average precipitation mm (inches)	217.5 (8.56)	166.8 (6.57)	149.3 (5.88)	114.1 (4.49)	109.0 (4.29)	104.1 (4.10)	122.2 (4.81)	140.5 (5.53)	142.3 (5.60)	201.8 (7.94)	207.0 (8.15)	212.7 (8.37)	1,887.3 (74.29)
Average precipitation days	20.0	16.8	16.5	14.9	13.6	13.8	16.2	16.4	15.8	18.9	19.0	18.9	200.8
Source 1: Météo Climat
Source 2: Météo Climat
