= Archibald Stirling, Lord Garden =

Scottish judge

Sir Archibald Stirling, Lord Garden (9 June 1617– 23 April 1668) of Garden (or Carden), near Buchlyvie, Stirlingshire was a Scottish judge who was a Senator of the College of Justice.

He was the eldest surviving son of Sir John Stirling, 2nd Laird of Garden, and was educated at the University of Glasgow, where he matriculated in 1643. He studied law.

== Career ==
In 1643, he became a member of several committees of war established for the defense of the kingdom. Later, in 1648, he was given command of a troop of horse in the army. That same year, he was also appointed to the Committee of Estates. In 1661 he was summoned to London with several other Royalists and appointed a Senator of the College of Justice, adopting the title of Lord Garden.

He sat in the Parliament of Scotland as a shire commissioner for Linlithgowshire from 1661 to 1663 and in the Convention of Estates of 1667.

== Private life ==
In 1667 he inherited the barony of Keir from his cousin, Sir George Stirling of Keir. He died soon afterwards in Edinburgh in 1668 and was buried in Dunblane.

He had married twice: firstly c.1620 Elizabeth Murray, daughter of Sir Patrick Murray of Elibank, with whom he had two sons and two daughters and secondly in 1646 Mause Murray, daughter of Sir James Murray of Kilaberton, with whom he had a further seven sons and two daughters. He was succeeded at Keir by his eldest son, John and at Garden by his second surviving son, Archibald.

His grandson was the mathematician James Stirling.
