= Susannite =

Lead sulfate carbonate hydroxide mineral

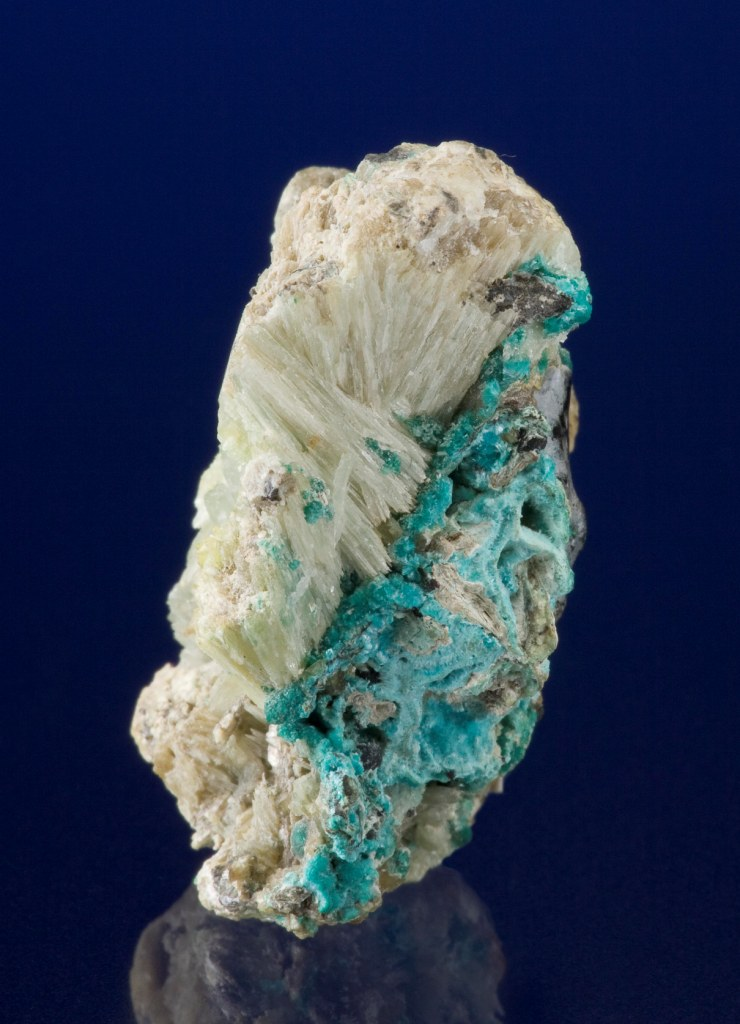
- Susanite with macphersonite and lanarkite from the Susanna Mine, Leadhills

General
- Category: Carbonate minerals
- Formula: Pb_{4}SO_{4}(CO_{3})_{2}(OH)_{2}
- IMA symbol: Sus
- Strunz classification: 5.BF.40
- Crystal system: Trigonal
- Crystal class: Rhombohedral (3̅); H-M symbol: (3̅)
- Space group: R3̅
- Unit cell: a = 9.07, c = 11.57 [Å]; Z = 3

Identification
- Color: Colorless, white, pale green, pale yellow, brown
- Crystal habit: Occurs as equant to acute rhombohedral crystals
- Cleavage: {0001} perfect
- Mohs scale hardness: 2.5 - 3
- Luster: Adamantine, resinous
- Diaphaneity: Translucent
- Specific gravity: 6.55
- Optical properties: Uniaxial (anomalously biaxial)
- Refractive index: 1.96

Susannite is a lead sulfate carbonate hydroxide mineral. It has the formula Pb_{4}SO_{4}(CO_{3})_{2}(OH)_{2}. Susannite is the higher temperature phase of the two and forms above 80 °C when fluids oxidize the lead ore deposits. It is trimorphous with leadhillite and macphersonite.

Susannite crystallizes in the trigonal system. It is quite soft with a Mohs hardness of 2.5 to 3.0 and a relatively high specific gravity of 6.57.

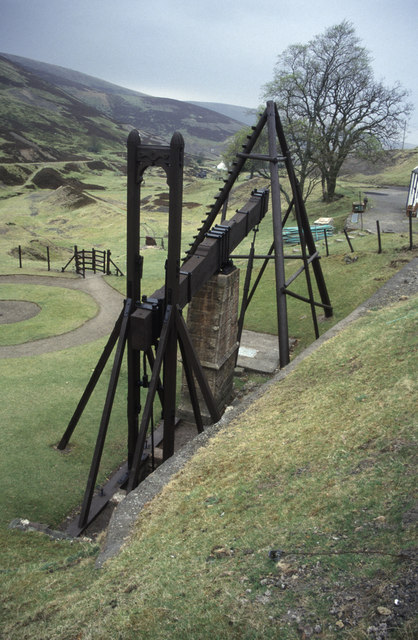
An old beam engine to dewater a lead mine at nearby Wanlockhead

It was discovered in 1827 in the Susannah Mine, Leadhills in the county of Lanark, Scotland. In addition to the type locality in Scotland, it has also been reported from various locations in Germany, the Tiger Mine in Pinal County, Arizona, from Iporanga, Brazil, and the Tsumeb mine of Namibia.
