= James Stirling (mathematician) =

Scottish mathematician

- Born: 11 May O.S. 1692; Garden, Stirlingshire
- Died: 5 December 1770 (aged 78); Edinburgh, Scotland
- Resting place: Greyfriars Kirkyard
- Known for: Stirling's approximation; Stirling numbers
- Scientific career
- Fields: Mathematics

James Stirling (11 May O.S. 1692, – 5 December 1770) was a Scottish mathematician. He was nicknamed the "Venetian".

The Stirling numbers, Stirling permutations, and Stirling's approximation are named after him. He also proved the correctness of Isaac Newton's classification of cubic plane curves.

== Biography ==
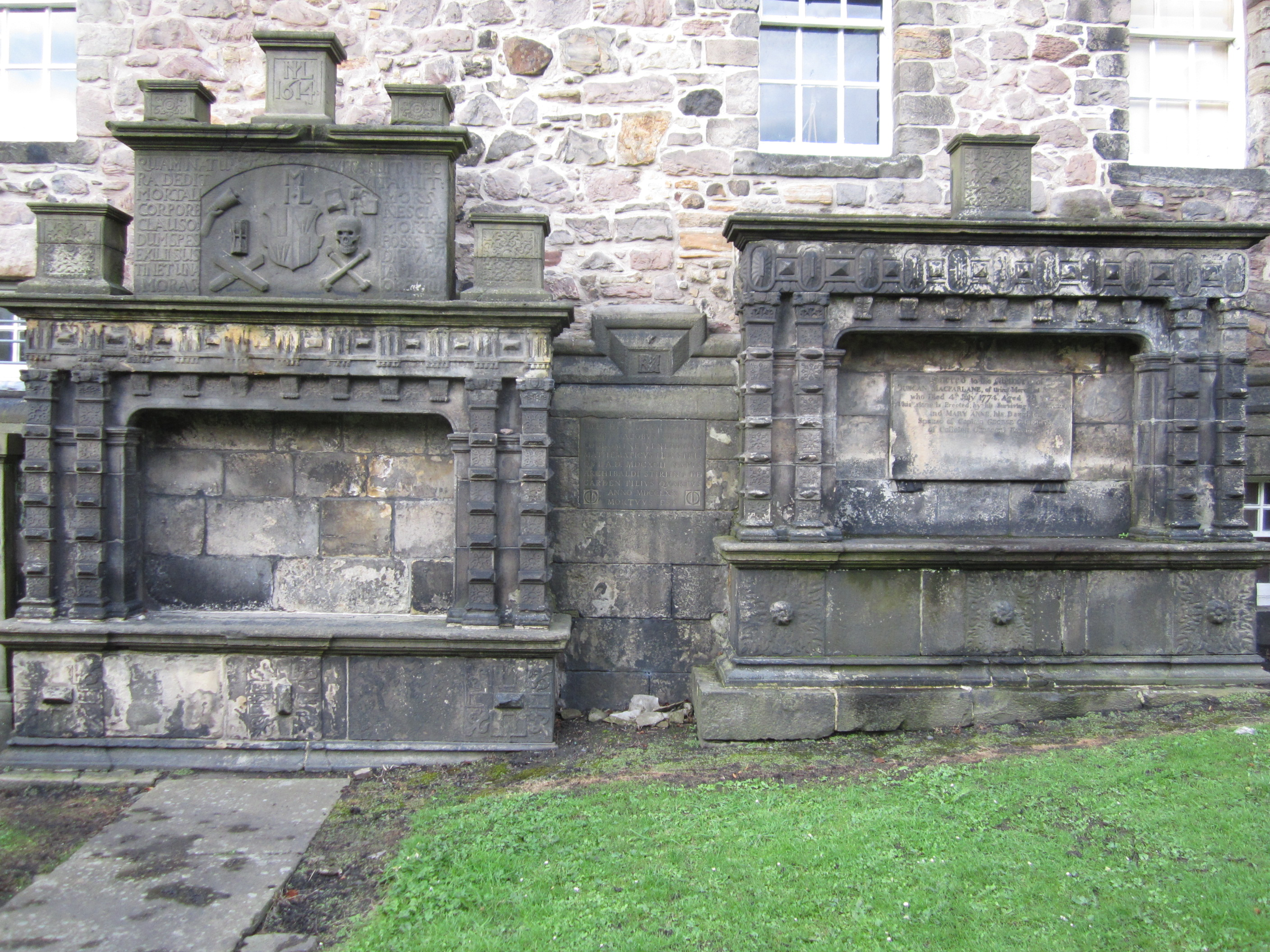
Stirling's grave in Greyfriars Kirkyard, Edinburgh, general view. It is the small plate between the two large tablets.

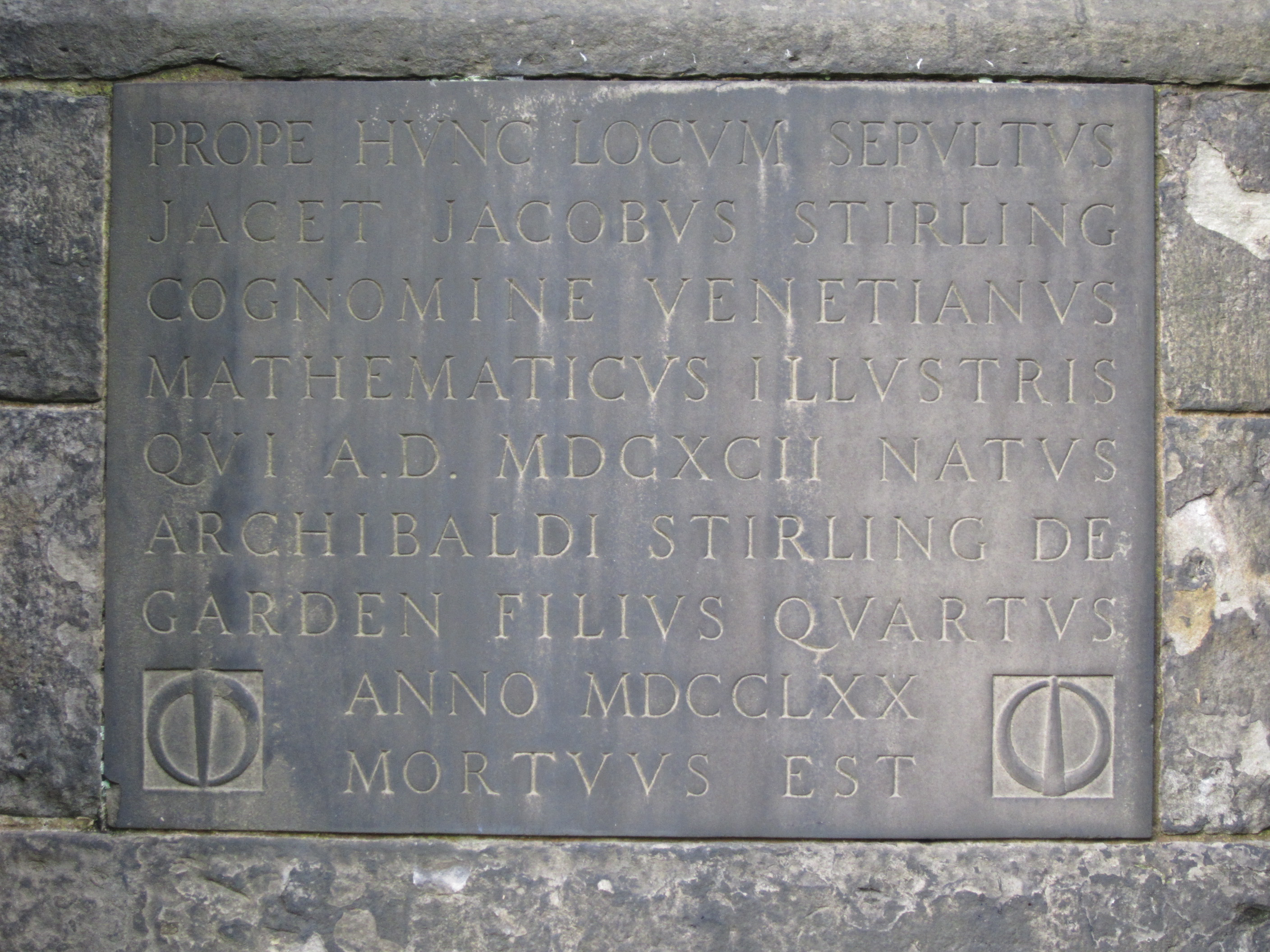
Stirling's grave in Greyfriars Kirkyard, Edinburgh, detail

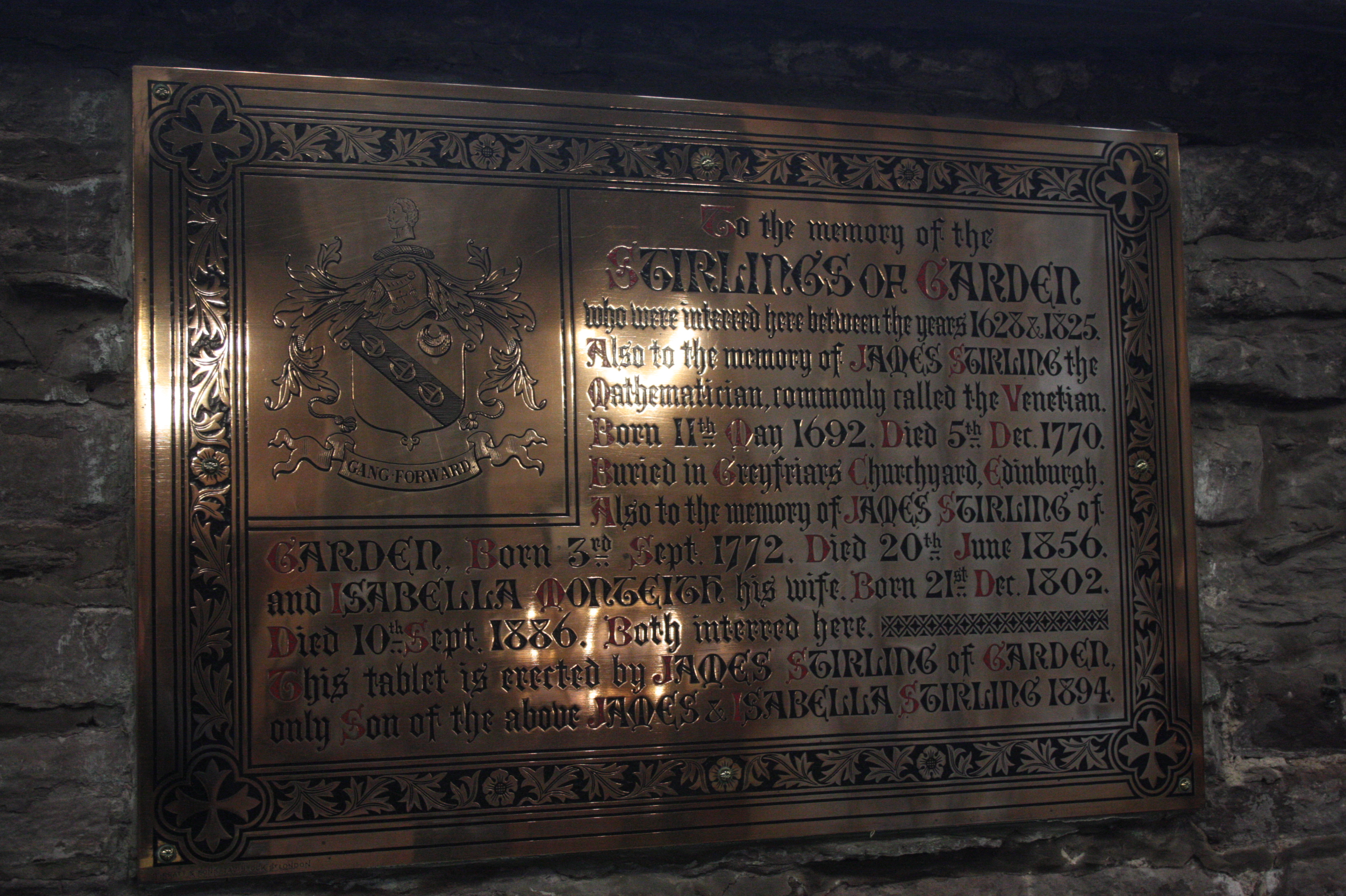
Plaque to the Stirlings of Garden, Dunblane Cathedral

Stirling was born on 11 May 1692 O.S. at Garden House near Stirling, the third son of Archibald Stirling (1651−1715) and Anna Hamilton, and grandson of Archibald Stirling, Lord Garden (1617−1668).

At 18 years of age he went to Balliol College, Oxford, where, chiefly through the influence of the Earl of Mar, he was nominated in 1711 to be one of Bishop Warner's exhibitioners (or Snell exhibitioner) at Balliol. In 1715 he was expelled on account of his correspondence with his cousins, who were members of the Keir and Garden families, who were noted Jacobites, and had been accessory to the "Gathering of the Brig o' Turk" in 1708.

From Oxford he made his way to Venice, where he occupied himself as a professor of mathematics. In 1717 appeared his Lineae tertii ordinis Newtonianae, sive . . . (8vo, Oxford). While in Venice, also, he communicated, through Isaac Newton, to the Royal Society a paper entitled "Methodus differentialis Newtoniana illustrata" (Phil. Trans., 1718). Fearing assassination on account of having discovered a trade secret of the glassmakers of Venice, he returned with Newton's help to London about the year 1725.

In London he remained for ten years, being most part of the time connected with an academy in Tower Street, and devoting his leisure to mathematics and correspondence with eminent mathematicians. In 1730 his most important work was published, the Methodus differentialis, sive tractatus de summatione et interpolatione serierum infinitarum (4to, London), which is something more than an expansion of the paper of 1718. In 1735, he communicated to the Royal Society a paper "On the Figure of the Earth, and on the Variation of the Force of Gravity at its Surface."

In the same year he was appointed manager for the Scots Mining Company at Leadhills, where the Scots Mining Company House was built for him in 1736. His next paper to the Royal Society was concerned, not with pure but with applied sciences; specifically, a trompe, i.e., a water-powered air compressor that was used by a Scottish lead mine. His name is also connected with another practical undertaking, since grown to vast dimensions. The accounts of the city of Glasgow for 1752 show that the very first instalment of ten million sterling spent in making Glasgow a seaport (a sum of £28, 4s. 4d.), was for a silver tea-kettle to be presented to "James Stirling, mathematician, for his service, pains, and trouble in surveying the river towards deepening it by locks."

Another edition of the Lineae tertii ordinis was published in Paris in 1797; another edition of the Methodus differentialis in London in 1764; and a translation of the latter into English by Halliday in London in 1749. A considerable collection of literary remains, consisting of papers, letters and two manuscript volumes of a treatise on weights and measures, are still preserved at Garden.

== See also ==
- Stirling polynomials
- Stirling transform
