= Scots Mining Company =

The Scots Mining Company, or Scotch Mines Company, was formed shortly after the Jacobite rising of 1715 by Sir John Erskine with the intention of better developing the mineral resources of Scotland. Primary investors were largely garnered from expatriate Scots living in London.

== History ==
Following its incorporation by royal charter in 1729, the Scots Mining Company procured leases for mines at Leadhills and elsewhere.

The company was near bankrupt when, in 1734, the mathematician James Stirling was appointed manager.

The systems of mining, social organisation and living conditions of the workers that Stirling introduced at Leadhills were revolutionary for their time, including reducing the underground day to six hours, introducing health insurance and hiring a surgeon to directly improve the lot of the men. In addition, he concentrated on better housing, education and the founding of the Leadhill Miners Reading Society in 1741. Many of these characteristic features of the company's paternalism were copied by other large mines.

By 1830, the company was the largest and most successful concern working the lead mines at Leadhills.

Following a protracted court case regarding water rights with the rival Leadhills Mining Company the Scots Mining Company was wound up in 1861.

== Operations ==
=== Leadhills ===
The area between Leadhills and Wanlockhead was the richest lead mining district in Scotland.

The Leadhills concession was obtained from the Earl of Hopetoun on whose land a significant deposits of lead and silver had been mined since 1513, and a limited gold mining operation had begun in 1517.

At the height of the trade in 1810, more than 1,400 tons of lead were being produced annually, by a workforce of 200 men.

=== Tyndrum ===
Lead was discovered on the Breadalbane estates in 1741. Mines were operated by three companies prior to the Scots Mining Company acquiring the lease in 1768. The company began working the mines in a more systematic manner, including the establishment of a smelter locally.

The Scots Mining Company pulled out in 1791, though operations continued intermittently until 1858 when the mines were reacquired by the Marquess of Breadalbane, who worked them until his death in 1862.
