= Lanarkite =

Lead sulfate mineral

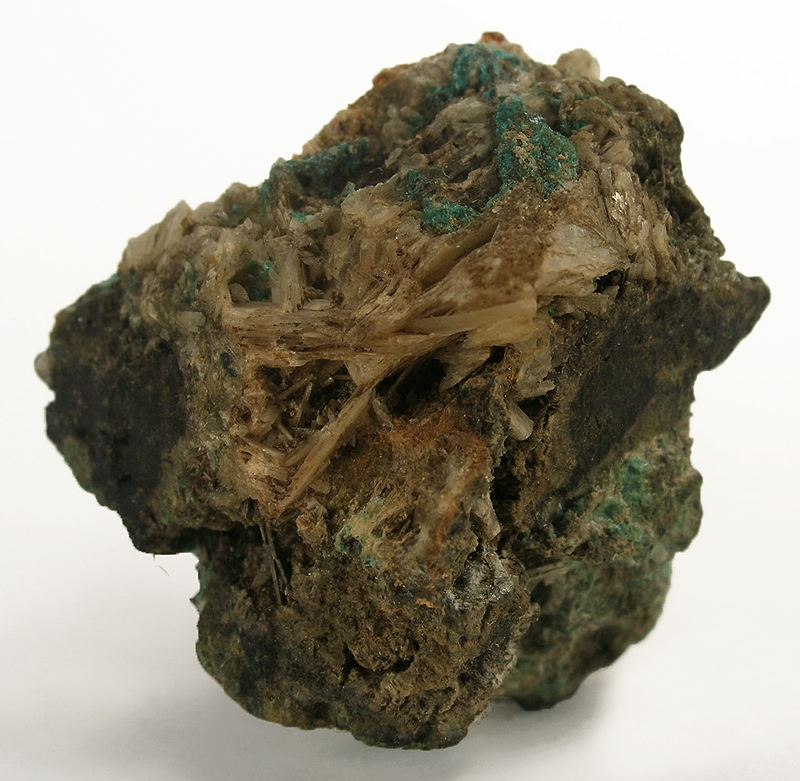

General
- Category: Sulfate minerals
- Formula: Pb_{2}(SO_{4})O
- IMA symbol: Lan
- Strunz classification: 7.BD.40
- Crystal system: Monoclinic
- Crystal class: Prismatic (2/m) (same H-M symbol)
- Space group: C2/m

Lanarkite is a mineral, a form of lead sulfate with formula Pb_{2}(SO_{4})O. It was originally found at Leadhills in the Scottish county of Lanarkshire, hence the name. It forms white or light green, acicular monoclinic prismatic crystals, usually microscopic in size. It is an oxidation product of galena.

In 2023, Lanarkite was used by Korean physicists in an attempt to make LK-99, a material evaluated for room-temperature superconductivity.
